= Malachim (Hasidic group) =

Hasidic group

The Malachim (Malochim or Malukhim) (Hebrew: מלאכים, lit. "angels") is a small Hasidic group. It adheres to the Chabad school of Hasidic thought which emphasizes in-depth Torah study, uses the Chabad nusach of prayer, and focuses on the study of Hasidic mysticism.

== History ==
The Malochim were founded by Rabbi Chaim Avraham Dov Ber Levine, also known as "The Malach" (lit. "the angel"), who arrived in New York in 1923. Levine had been one of the closest followers of Rabbi Shmuel Schneersohn and the tutor of his grandson, Rabbi Yosef Yitzchok Schneersohn.

Once in New York, Levine became the rabbi of Congregation Nusach Ari in the Bronx. Rabbi Shraga Feivel Mendlowitz, head of Mesivta Torah Vodaas, studied the Tanya with Levine and encouraged his mesivta students to visit him. Some of them became followers of Levine, starting a Hasidic quasi-dynasty known as "The Malachim." They began to adopt a more Hasidic style of dress, including "long black jackets and a very long tallis katan over their shirts, with the tzitzit showing below their jacket hems". When the Malachim openly challenged Mendlowitz's authority, they were barred from entering the mesivta by older students and in 1936 and left Torah Vodaas to establish their own yeshiva called Nesivos Olam. According to Nesanel Quinn, the then menahel (director), they left on their own. However, according to Rabbi Meir Weberman, one of Levine's followers, Quinn expelled them but later apologized.

Levine died in 1938, leaving no formally appointed successor.

Nesivos Olam, located at 205 Hewes St. in the Williamsburg section of Brooklyn, New York, was led by Rabbi Meyer Weberman, although due to his poor health and after his death, his son Rabbi Mordechai Wolf (William) Weberman, a prominent member of Neturei Karta, began serving in the mid-2000s as its semi-official leader. Rabbi Melech Flohr later led it.

== Relationship with other groups ==
=== Chabad ===
According to one leader of the Malachim, one significant difference is that Chabad involves itself with the affairs of the Israeli government, while the Malachim are staunchly anti-Zionist. Also, the Malachim acknowledge only the first five Chabad-Lubavitch rebbes as the legitimate rebbes of Chabad. Some of the descendants of former Malachim have returned to mainstream Chabad.

=== Satmar ===
Many descendants of former Malachim have joined the Satmar movement, due to their shared anti-Zionist views.

Once a woman is said to have approached a former Satmar Rebbe, Rabbi Yoel Teitelbaum, complaining that her son had become a Malach [Hebrew for "angel"]. Rabbi Teitelbaum is said to have replied jokingly, "Don't worry. He won't fly away."
