= Chaim Avraham Dov Ber Levine =

- Born: 1859-1860 (on Passport is stated birth year 1842)
- Died: June 5, 1938
- Other name: The Malach
- Children: Raphael Zalman Levine

Chaim Avraham Dov Ber Levine (1859/1860 – 1938), known as "the Malach" (lit. "the angel"), was a rabbi and founder of the Malachim (Hasidic group).

== Biography ==
Levine was one of the closest followers of Sholom Dovber Schneersohn, the fifth rebbe of Lubavitch, and was the tutor of his son, Yosef Yitzchok Schneersohn. Upon his arrival in New York in 1923, he was welcomed by Shraga Feivel Mendlowitz, the rosh yeshiva (dean) of Yeshiva Torah Vodaath in Brooklyn.

Levine parted ways with the Lubavitch group, and the Malachim became separate from the Lubavitch movement. However, he continued to teach Chabad works from the first generations of the movement, and subscribed to the core theosophy of Chabad. After Levine's death, Yankev Schorr led the group.
