= Mesivta =

Orthodox Jewish boys school

Metivta (also mesivta; Aramaic: מתיבתא, "academy") is an Orthodox Jewish yeshiva secondary school for boys. The term is commonly used in the United States to describe a yeshiva that emphasizes Talmudic studies for boys in grades 9 through 11 or 12; alternately, it refers to the religious studies track in a yeshiva high school that offers both religious and secular studies.

The comparable term in Israel for the former is Yeshiva Ketana (Hebrew: ישיבה קטנה, lit. "small yeshiva"), for the latter Yeshiva Tichonit (ישיבה תיכונית, "yeshiva high-school"). This article focuses on the US; see Chinuch Atzmai and Mamlachti dati for respective discussion of these Israeli institutions.

After graduation from a metivta, students progress to a beth midrash, or undergraduate-level, yeshiva program. In practice, yeshivas that call themselves metivtas are usually a combination of metivta (high-school) and beth medrash (post-high-school) programs. Students in the beth medrash program are often called upon to mentor those in the metivta.

== History ==
=== In Talmudic and Geonic eras ===
The term metivta first appears in the Talmud, where it refers to a yeshiva of Talmudic sages. Abba Arika learned in the metivta in Sepphoris under Judah the Prince, his son, and grandson. Under the leadership of Rav and Samuel of Nehardea, the Talmudic Academy of Sura during the Babylonian Exile was called a sidra, but under Rav Huna, the second dean of the Academy of Sura, the yeshiva began to be called a metivta and Huna was the first to hold the title of resh metivta (corresponding to rosh yeshiva). According to Graetz, the metivta convened in certain months of the year. Metivta frameworks continued to operate throughout the era of the Geonim, a period of approximately 1000 years.

=== Modern-day concept ===
The dual curriculum high school was pioneered by the Manhattan Talmudical Academy of Yeshiva University (now known as Marsha Stern Talmudical Academy) in 1916; Tachkemoni was active in Poland and then Israel at approximately that time; ALMA was established in Jerusalem in 1936, and "ha-Yishuv" in Tel Aviv in 1937. See Religious Zionism § Educational institutions.

As regards the more intensive Talmudic studies program, Rabbi Shraga Feivel Mendlowitz introduced the concept of a metivta for boys aged 14 and older in New York in 1926. Until that time, religious boys attended Talmud Torah (elementary school) until their bar mitzvah and then went on to public high school and college, where their level of Torah observance and commitment were sorely tested. The only post-bar mitzvah religious education available at the time was at Yeshivat Rabbeinu Yitzchak Elchonon's Talmudical Academy (founded 1916), which prepared students for a career in the rabbinate. When Mendlowitz, who had begun teaching at the Yeshiva Torah Vodaas elementary school in 1923, suggested the innovation, he was met with widespread resistance. An editorial in the Yiddish Morgen Journal stated:

Just as the Reform have a rabbinical Seminary in Cincinnati, and the Conservative have the Solomon Schechter Seminary in New York, so should Yeshivas Rabbeinu Yitzchak Elchonon suffice [to produce Orthodox rabbis].

With the support of three Torah Vodaas board members – Binyomin Wilhelm, Ben Zion Weberman, and Abraham Lewin – Mendlowitz successfully opened metivta Torah Vodaas in its own building in Williamsburg, Brooklyn, in September 1926. The metivta opened with four classes of post-bar mitzvah students and 11 students in the advanced, beth midrash program. The metivta went on to graduate generations of students who became Torah scholars and leaders in the American Jewish world.

Mendlowitz also influenced the administration at Yeshivas Chaim Berlin to expand beyond eighth grade and open a metivta as well. Metivta Rabbi Chaim Berlin opened in the 1930s. Other metivtas founded in the 1930s and 1940s were Metivta Tifereth Jerusalem, Kaminetzer Metivta of Boro Park, and Rabbi Jacob Joseph School. In the 1950s, the latter four metivtas had their own basketball league.

In 1937 Mendlowitz founded Camp Metivta, the first yeshiva summer camp in America, in Ferndale, New York. This became the summer camp of choice for thousands of students from other yeshivas and a prototype for yeshiva learning camps in later decades. Mendlowitz instituted the practice of inviting Gedolim to visit the camp for a few days or a few weeks, giving campers the experience of seeing Torah greats in action. The Gedolim who regularly stayed at Camp Metivta included Rabbi Yaakov Kamenetsky, Rabbi Shlomo Heiman, Rabbi Moshe Feinstein, and Rabbi Avraham Kalmanowitz. Camp Metivta operated until the early 1960s; in 1966, it was succeeded by Camp Ohr Shraga-Beis Medrash LeTorah in Greenfield Park, New York, headed by Rabbi Zelik Epstein and Rabbi Nesanel Quinn.

== 21st century ==
Today metivtas are located in cities throughout the United States that have a sizable Orthodox Jewish population. Since the 1980s, the number of metivtas in the New York/New Jersey area has grown from a handful of schools until every city with a religious Jewish population and nearly every township has a yeshiva high school. Because of the proliferation, metivtas have developed reputations that reflect the academic level of their students. There are schools for metzuyanim (top learners), schools for average students, and schools for students with "serious scholastic and/or Yirat Shamayim (religious belief) challenges". Some metivtas operate different "tracks" to satisfy a diverse student body.

Metivtas, like yeshivas, do not follow the public education schedule of terms and vacations, but organize the school year according to the Hebrew calendar. School is in recess during Jewish holidays, and the term ends in the month of Av, the traditional break for yeshivas since the days of the Talmud. There is also a dress code: whereas in elementary school, boys wear more casual clothes to school, upon entering metivta, they are expected to dress in dark pants and white shirts.

== Gallery ==
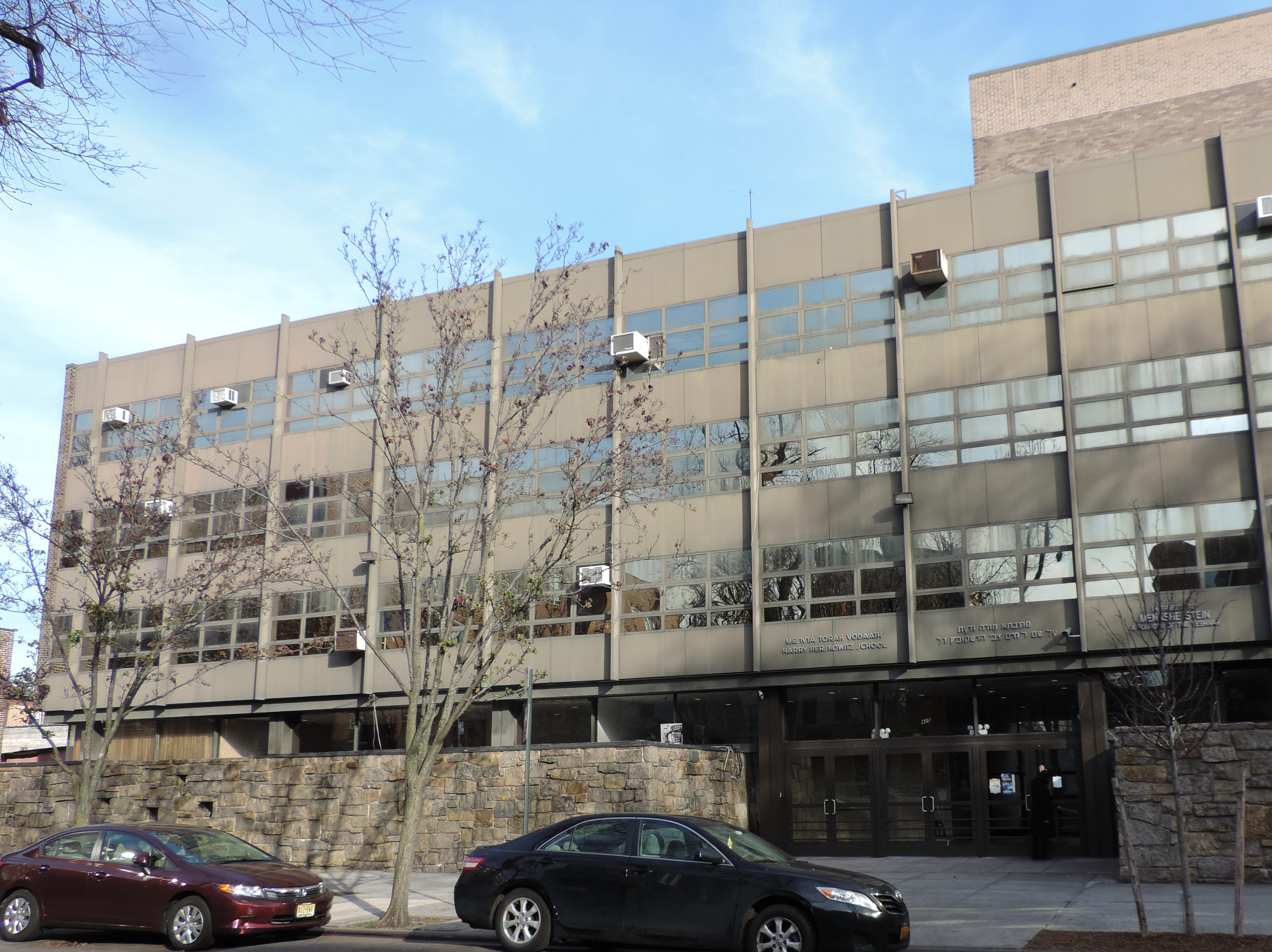
Torah Vodaas Metivta (Harry Herskowitz School)

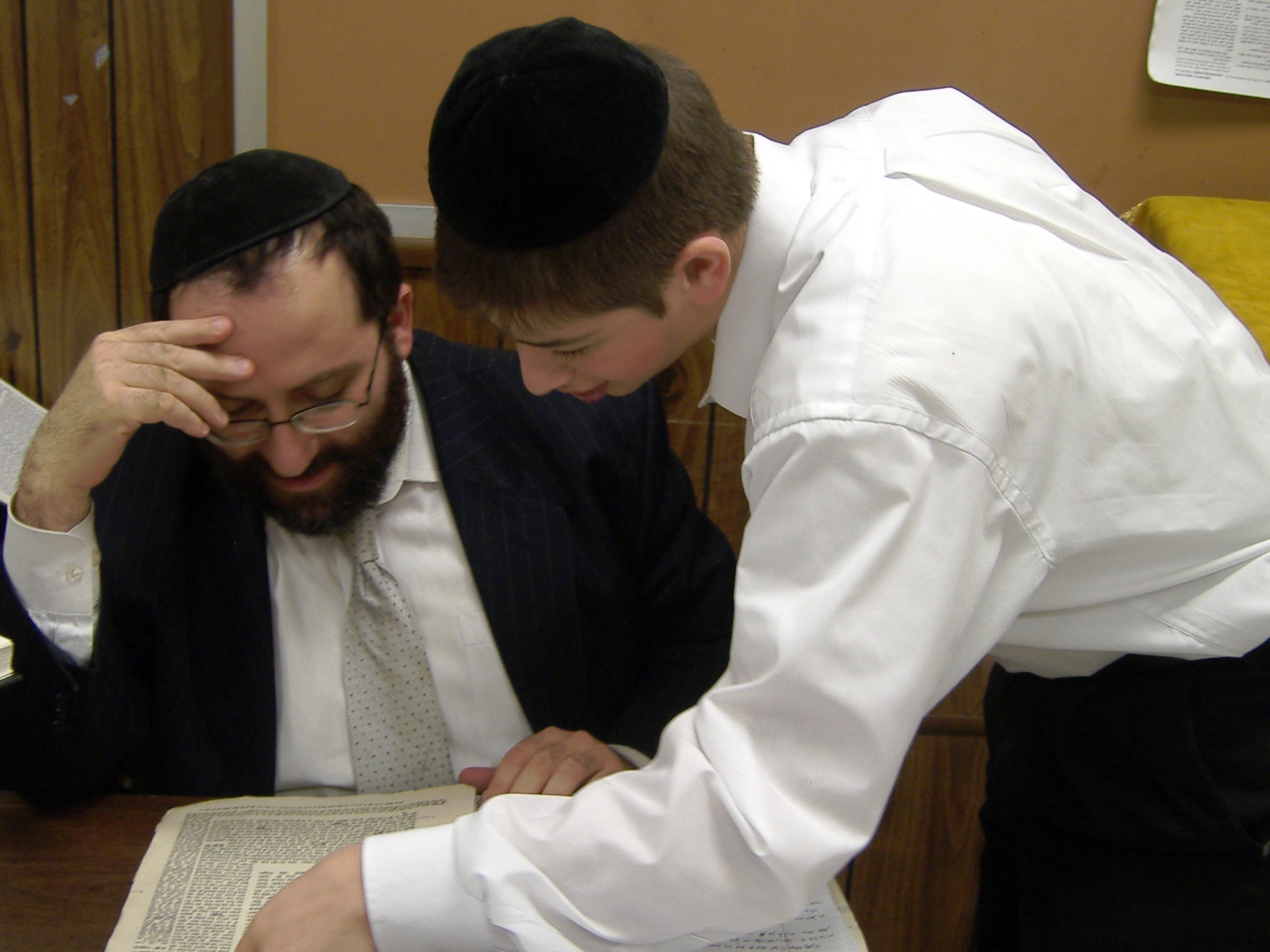
Haredi Metivta student

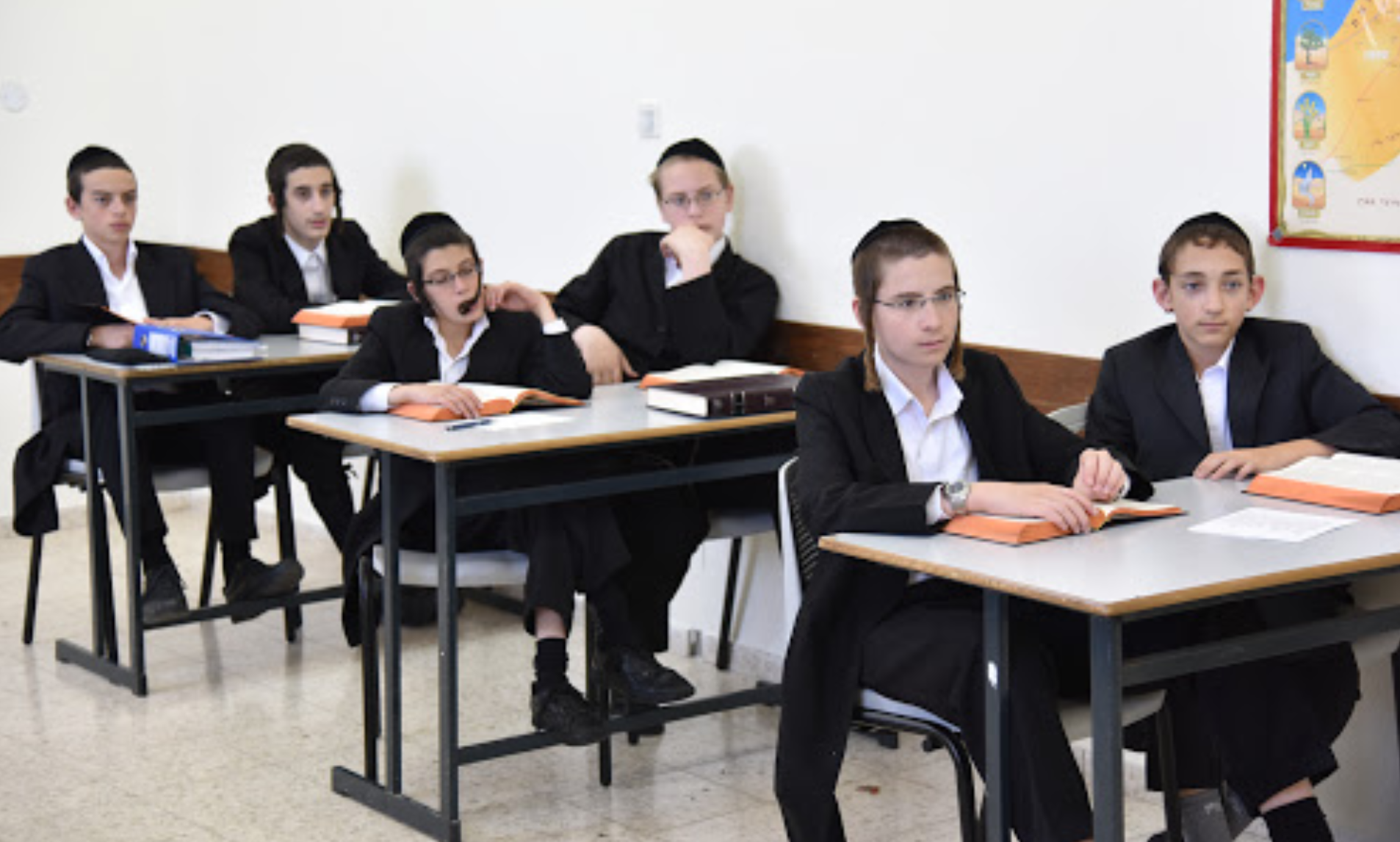
Gemara class, Hasidic yeshiva

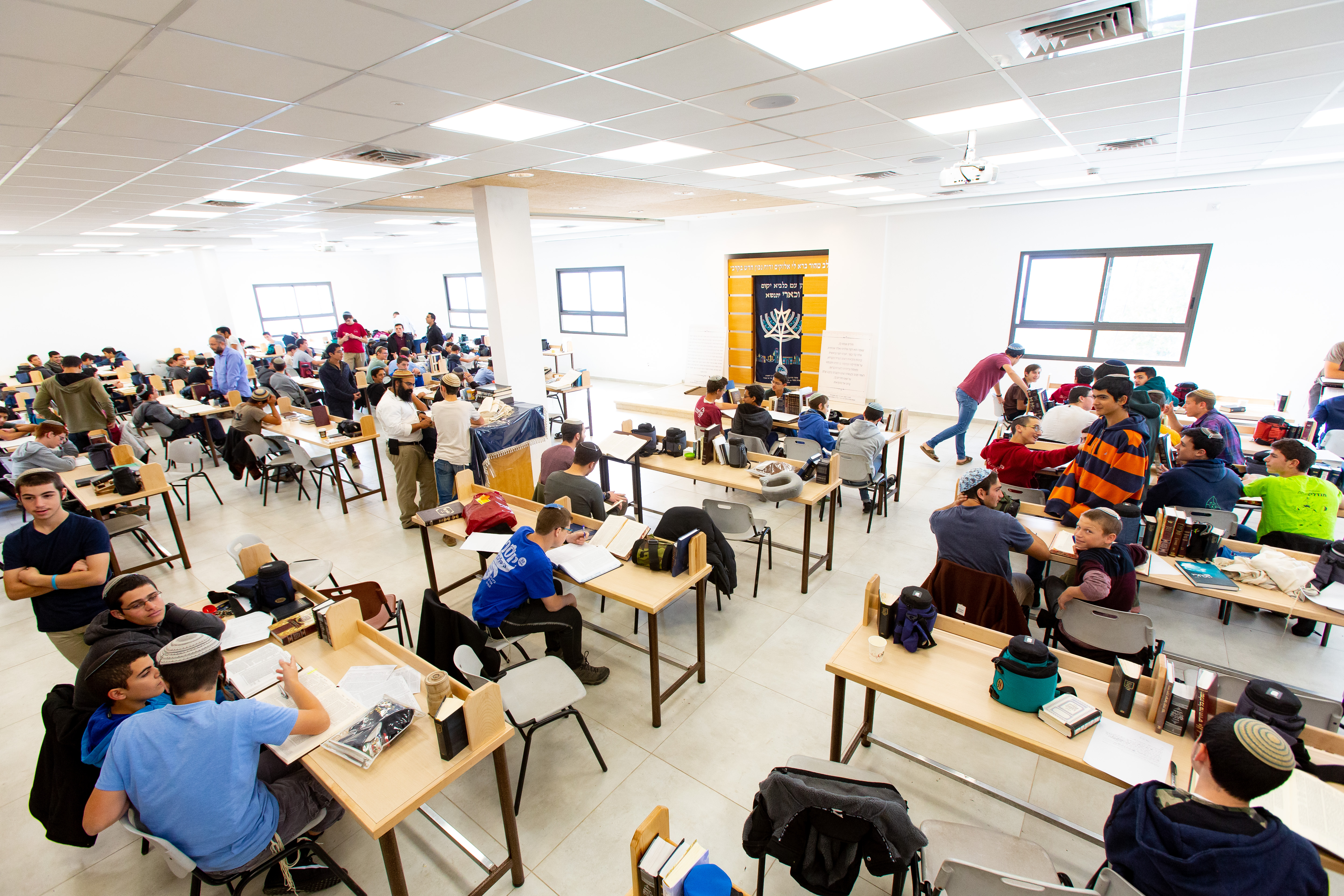
Bet Midrash, Yeshiva Tichonit

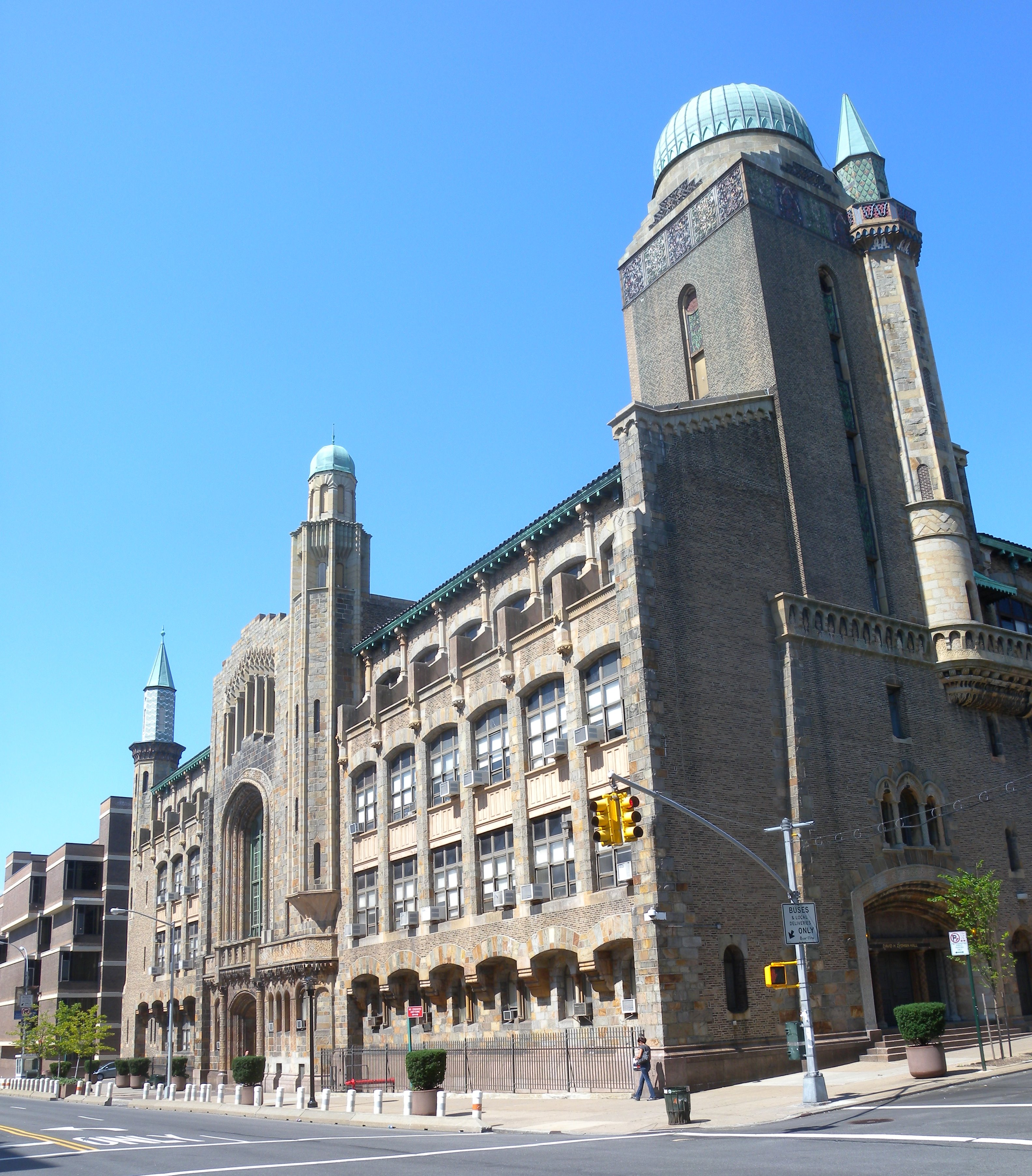
Yeshiva University High School For Boys

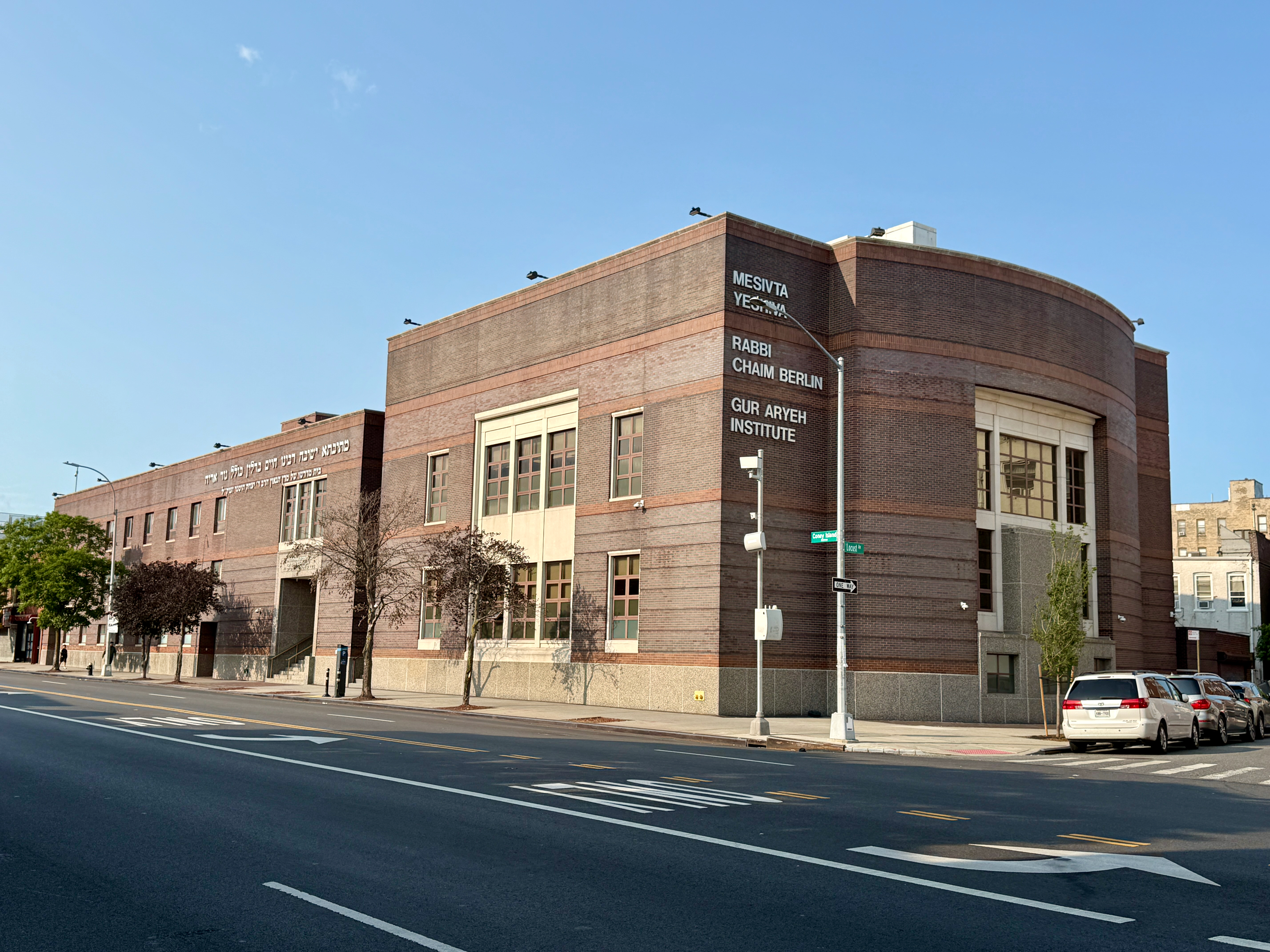
Metivta, Yeshiva Rabbi Chaim Berlin

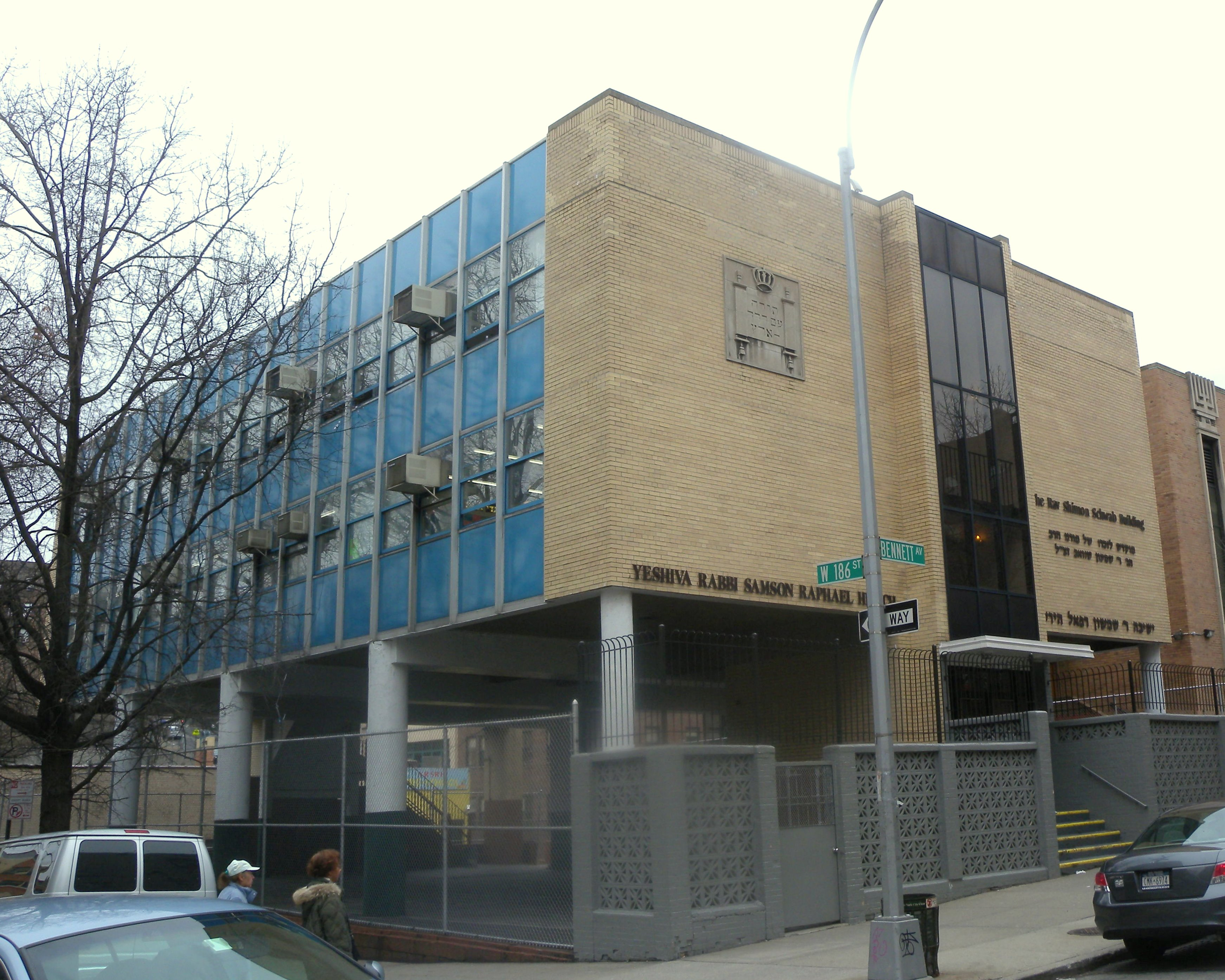
Yeshiva Rabbi Samson Raphael Hirsch

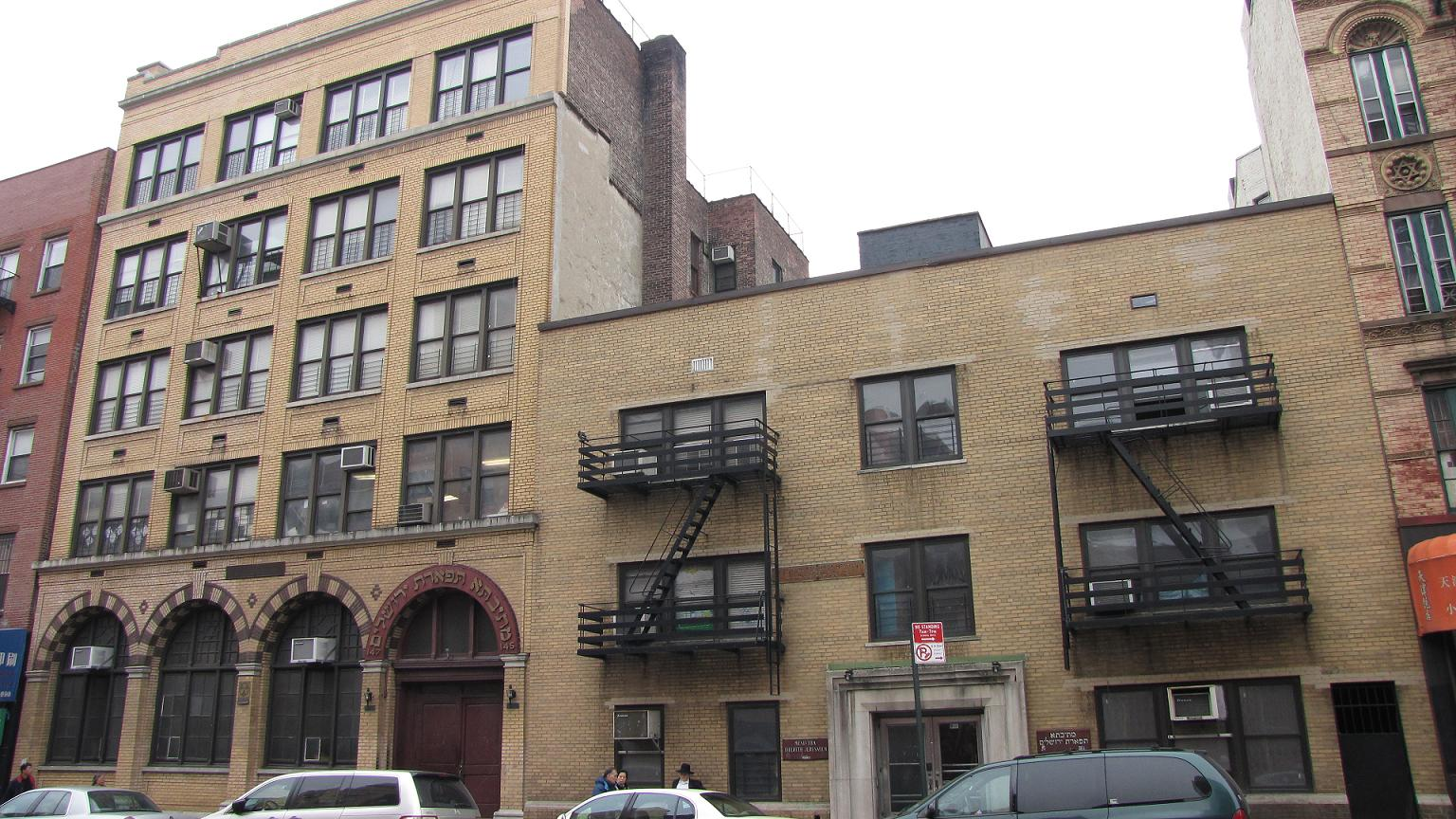
Metivtha Tifereth Jerusalem

== See also ==
- Bais Yaakov
- Jewish education
- List of mesivtas
- Yeshiva Gedolah

== Sources ==
- Astor, Yaakov. "Harry Herskowitz: A legend who made a different world and a world of difference" in Daring To Dream: Profiles in the growth of the American Torah community, Agudath Israel of America, May 2003, pp. 16–45.
- Berezovsky, Rabbi Sholom Noach (2001). Nesivos Sholom. ISBN 1-58330-495-9.
- Blau, Yosef (2006). The Conceptual Approach to Jewish Learning. Yeshiva University Press. ISBN 0-88125-907-1.
- Graetz, Heinrich (1893). History of the Jews. Vol. 2. Cosimo. ISBN 978-1-60520-943-2.
- Heilman, Samuel C. (July 2006). Sliding to the Right: The Contest for the Future of American Jewish Orthodoxy. University of California Press. p. 87. ISBN 0-520-23136-8.
- William B. Helmreich (February 2000). The World of the Yeshiva: An intimate portrait of Orthodox Jewry. Ktav Publishing House. ISBN 978-0-88125-641-3.
- Holder, Meir (March 2004). History of the Jewish people: from Yavneh to Pumbedisa. Mesorah Publications. ISBN 0-89906-499-X.
- Kamen, Robert Mark (1985). Growing up Hasidic: Education and socialization in the Bobover Hasidic community. AMS Press. ISBN 0-404-19411-7.
- Kramer, Doniel Zvi (1984). The Day Schools and Torah Umesorah: The seeding of traditional Judaism in America. Yeshiva University Press.
- Jewish Education, Volumes 46-47. National Council for Jewish Education. 1978.
- Rosenblum, Yonoson (2001). Reb Shraga Feivel: The life and times of Rabbi Shraga Feivel Mendlowitz, the architect of Torah in America. Mesorah Publications. ISBN 1-57819-797-X.
- Singer, Isidore; Adler, Cyrus (1925). The Jewish Encyclopedia. Vol. 6. Funk & Wagnalls.
- Sorski, Aharon (1982). Giants of Jewry. Vol. 1. Chinuch Publications.
