= Sholom Rivkin =

Chief Rabbi Sholom Rivkin
- Title: Chief Rabbi of St. Louis

Personal life
- Born: 6 June 1926 Jerusalem, British Mandate for Palestine
- Died: 1 October 2011 (aged 85) St. Louis, Missouri
- Buried: Mount of Olives, Jerusalem
- Spouse: Paula (nee Zuckerman)
- Children: Jacqueline (Yocheved), Rabbi Bentzion
- Parent(s): Rabbi Moshe Ber Rivkin; Nacha Rivkin (nee Heber)

Religious life
- Religion: Judaism
- Denomination: Orthodox Judaism

Jewish leader
- Predecessor: Rabbi Menachem Tzvi Eichenstein
- Successor: Position discontinued
- Position: Chief Rabbi
- Organisation: United Orthodox Jewish Community - Vaad Hoeir
- Began: 1983
- Ended: 2005
- Other: Chief Rabbi Emeritus (2005–2011)
- Residence: St. Louis, Missouri
- Semikhah: Yeshiva Torah Vodaas

Rabbi Sholom Rivkin (6 June 1926 – 1 October 2011) was a Palestine-born American rabbi. He was the last Chief Rabbi of St. Louis, Missouri, and the last chief rabbi of one of only a few cities in the United States that has ever had a chief rabbi. He held the post of Chief Rabbi from 1983 until 2005 and was Chief Rabbi Emeritus until his death in 2011. He was also a chief judge on the Beth Din of the Rabbinical Council of America, and head of the Vaad Hoeir of St. Louis, the governing body of the St. Louis Orthodox Jewish community. He was an expert in Jewish law, especially family and divorce law, and was consulted by rabbis and rabbinical courts around the world.

== Early life and education ==
Sholom Rivkin was born June 6, 1926, at Hadassah Hospital in Jerusalem. His father was Rabbi Moshe Ber Rivkin, a protégé and beloved chasid of Rabbi Sholom Dovber Schneersohn (also known as “the Rashab”), the fifth Rebbe (spiritual leader) of the Chabad Lubavitch Hasidic movement. His mother was Nacha Rivkin (née Heber) of Kalisz, Poland. Rabbi Moshe Ber and Nacha married in 1920 and their daughter, Ella, was born in 1921. In 1924, Moshe Ber Rivkin was sent by the Rashab to Palestine to be the dean of a rabbinical school, the Yeshivas Toras Emes in Jerusalem, where their son, Sholom, was born.

Following the 1929 Palestine riots, Rivkin's family emigrated to the United States and settled in Borough Park, Brooklyn, where Rivkin's father become the dean of Yeshiva Torah Vodaath. His mother was one of the founders of the Shulamith School for Girls in Borough Park, Brooklyn, the first girls’ yeshiva in the United States. She became a renowned Hebrew textbook author and Jewish educator, championing day school education for Orthodox Jewish girls.

Rivkin became a rabbinical scholar at the Yeshiva Torah Vodaath and Beth Medrash Elyon and was an exemplary student of Rabbis Shlomo Heiman and Reuvain Grozovsky. He received his rabbinic ordination at Yeshiva Torah Vodaath. and a second, advanced semicha from Rabbi Moshe Binyamin Tomashoff, who, when he was ordained, called him "among the most gifted of his generation."

== Early career and marriage ==
In 1947, at age 21, Rivkin was appointed a rosh yeshiva (dean) at Yeshiva Rabbi Chaim Berlin school in Brooklyn. However, in 1949, at the encouragement of the sixth Lubavitcher Rebbe, Rabbi Yosef Yitzchok Schneersohn, Rivkin moved to St. Louis, Missouri, to become the rabbi of the Nusach Ha'Ari congregation. He also became the Jewish chaplain at the Veterans Administration Hospital at Jefferson Barracks and an administrator and counselor at Epstein Hebrew Academy.

In 1954 married Paula Zuckerman, the only child of Rabbi Dov Berish Zuckerman and Hinda Zuckerman. Paula's family had fled Austria after the annexation of Austria into Nazi Germany in 1938. They subsequently had two children, Bentzion and Yocheved.

In 1959, the family moved to Seattle, where Rivkin became the rabbi of Congregation Bikur Cholim. In 1970, they moved to Queens, N.Y., where Rivkin served as rabbi of Young Israel of Wavecrest and Bayswater.

== National Beth Din judge ==
After moving to Queens, Rivkin was appointed chief judge (dayan) of the Beth Din (Court of Jewish Law) of America Rabbinical Council of America. He held this post for 15 years.

Rabbi Rivkin was known for his compassion and sensitivity in dealing with often sensitive issues. He was a renowned expert in halakha (Jewish law), and an international authority on Jewish divorce law. Rabbis and rabbinical courts from all over the world consulted him on these matters. He also traveled to the Soviet Union to perform Jewish religious divorces. Rivkin was often at the forefront of dealing with new issues in the area of Jewish family law. For example, in the 1980s, he decided to allow a Jewish woman to undergo in vitro fertilization and this decision subsequently influenced others in the area of Jewish medical ethics.

== Chief Rabbi of St. Louis ==
The Vaad Hoeir (community council) of St. Louis invited Rivkin to return to St. Louis as Chief Rabbi, following the death in 1981 of the previous chief rabbi, Rabbi Menachem Eichenstein, who had served in that position since 1941. In 1983, Rivkin succeeded Eichenstein as Chief Rabbi.

For the next 22 years, Rivkin presided as Chief Rabbi over the St. Louis Rabbinical Court and led the Vaad Hoeir of St. Louis, a council that supervises facets of Jewish observance ranging from kosher practice to education to religious divorce. He was the final arbiter of all cases of Jewish law of the Rabbinical Court, and both his scholarship and care for others were noted as hallmarks of his term of office.

In 2005, Rivkin retired as Chief Rabbi due to ill health and he was named Chief Rabbi Emeritus. No new appointment was made to fill his position.

The institution of Chief Rabbi was rare in the United States and existed only in a few U.S. cities; St. Louis was the last city in which a chief rabbi led the Orthodox Jewish community, and Rivkin was thus the last chief rabbi of a city in the United States.

== Family ==
After their marriage in 1954, Paula (Pepi) Rivkin became a clinical psychologist. She was an advocate for women and a co-founder of the Jewish Council Against Family Violence. She was also a community leader, serving as a member of the board of directors of the Jewish Federation of St. Louis, the board and advisory committee of the St. Louis Jewish Light, and as a driving force behind the renovation of the community mikveh. The couple was married for 56 years, until Paula died January 7, 2011, aged 78.

Their son, Rabbi Benzion Rivkin, was the 41st in a continuous line of rabbis in the Rivkin family. Their daughter Yocheved (Jacqueline) Rivkin Rubin is a journalist living in New York City. Jacqueline's husband, attorney Edward Rubin, is deceased. The Rivkins had two grandchildren, Rabbi Levi Yitzchak Rivkin (wife, Sarah) and Nacha Rivkin Rubin; and two great-grandchildren, Bracha Rivkin and Yakov Moshe Rivkin. A third greatgrandchild was born in December 2011 and is named Tova Pesia, after her great-grandmother, the rebbetzin.

Rivkin died on October 1, 2011, of complications from Parkinson's disease. He was 85 years old. Three memorial services were held: one at Young Israel in St. Louis, in keeping with the tradition that the funeral of the Gadol Ha’ir (the rabbinic leader of the city) take place inside a synagogue; a second at Yeshivah Torah Vodaath in New York, and the third in Jerusalem. Rivkin was buried next to his wife, parents and grandparents at the Mount of Olives Cemetery in Jerusalem.

Jewish titles
| Preceded by Menachem Eichenstein | Chief Rabbi of St. Louis; 1983–2005 | Succeeded by — |
