= Zecharia Dershowitz =

19th century founder of the first Hasidic synagogue in New York

Zecharia Dershowitz (legally Zacharja Derschowitz; July 6, 1860 – April 5, 1921), known as Reb Zecharia, was a Ropshitz Hasid (Polish Jew). He immigrated to the United States in 1888 from Galicia, Poland at age twenty nine. He founded one of the first Yiddish communities in America and the first Hasidic synagogue in Williamsburg, New York. His children utilized the synagogue to save European Jews from the Holocaust by helping them immigrate to the US, hiring them as a rabbi and then firing them.

== Early life ==
The earliest confirmed family history is the marriage of Dershowitz's parents, Yechezkel Dershowitz to Chana Rivka, some time before 1840, in the district of Tarnów (then Galicia). Their oldest child was Zecharia, born at least after 20 years of marriage. After arrival in the United States, three more children were born to Zecharia and Lea: Gussie, Hymie and Rosie.

Of Zecharja's six known siblings, at least five immigrated to the United States. Four established families in the New York area, and the children of the fifth (Gussie Korn) settled in the Philadelphia area.

== Migration ==
Zecharia Dershowitz and his family left Pilsner, Galicia, months before boarding the boat to the US. They arrived in New York in January, 1888, arriving at Castle Garden (now a museum at the foot of Battery Park in Manhattan). Accompanying Zecharia were his wife Leah and their four children; Louis (age five), Sol (age four), Sam (age two) and Sadie (under a year old). The family considered itself to be Ropshitz Hasidim.

For the 1900 census, the family consisted of Zecharia, his wife Lena (Lea), aged 50, and their seven children: Louis, age 18; Solomon, 14; Samuel, 13; Sadie, 12; Hyman, 8; Gussie, 6; and Rosie, 4 at the address of 127 Goerck Street, on the Lower East Side of Manhattan, On August 4, 1902, after they moved from Goerck Street to 61 Lewis Street, Zecharia was granted American citizenship. Sadie later married Barney Hochhauser; Gussie - Boris Mines; and Rosie - (Joe) Zalman Hillel Fendel. These Manhattan streets no longer exist, overtaken by the needs of the Williamsburg Bridge in 1903, and other neighborhood projects.

== Employment ==
His occupation was listed as tailor, which meant he worked in a sweatshop in the garment district.

One of his employers was the Triangle Shirt Factory, scene of the notorious Triangle Shirtwaist Factory fire. His life was spared because, as a Sabbath observer, he had not come to work that day.

== Community leader ==
Dershowitz served as president of the 100 Cannon Street Burial Society. Under his jurisdiction, burial grounds were purchased in Mt. Hebron Cemetery in Queens. Dershowitz and his four sons: Leibish (Louis), Shmeil (Sam), Shulem (Sol), and Yechezkel (Hyman) had their names engraved on the right door post of the synagogue cemetery plot.

== Brooklyn ==
Zecharia moved to Williamsburg in 1910, along with East Side families who eventually moved to Brooklyn and other neighborhoods. There, he established the family synagogue on Roebling Street. Eventually, the synagogue moved to 94 South 10th Street. The deed to the building stated that one side of the property was the border between the City of Brooklyn and the town of Williamsburg. He and sons Louis and Sam were active in the Board of Directors of Yeshiva Torah Vodaath, which Louis had established with his friend Binyomin Wilhelm in 1918. It was the second yeshivah in Brooklyn, (the first was Tifereth Bachurim, which became Yeshiva Rabbi Chaim Berlin in 1919).

Zecharia converted the basement apartment into the family synagogue. To make sure that the family could support itself without working on the Sabbath, the synagogue was used as a workshop. He opened a factory by purchasing a sewing machine and a machine that put clamps on change-purses. These were set up in the corner of the Ladies’ Section of the synagogue. All three of his daughters eventually lived with their families in the three-family home. After Zecharia died, Leah continued to live there with the Fendel family above the shul. Zecharia had opened a hole in the floor of his apartment, right above the synagogue's reading table, and covered it with a grate and a carpet. The grate was under the dining room table. When the ladies of the family wanted to pray with the men, they had the choice of going down to the Ladies’ Section, or remaining in the Fendel dining room and uncovering the grate.

== Death ==
In an advertisement in the Yiddish press, placed by Yeshiva Torah Vodaath, Zecharia was called a Hassid, businessman and one who studied and taught Torah. They also stated that he had raised money for charity. He was known as the “Tzaddik of Williamsburg.”

== Legacy ==
The saga of Leah and Zecharia influenced the history of the American Jewish Community. Harvard University Professor Alan Dershowitz is a son of Harry, grandson of Louis, and great-grandson of Zecharia. Other descendants include Rabbi Meyer Fendel, Rabbi Professor Zecharia Dor-Shav, Shulem Lemmer, Yaakov Lemmer, Rabbi Baruch Chait, Rabbi Dovid Chait, Hillel Fendel, Frank Storch, Professor Nachum Dershowitz, and Rebbetzin Malky Travitsky.

== See also ==
- Dershowitz
