= Yeshivat Shavei Hevron =

- ישיבת שבי חברון
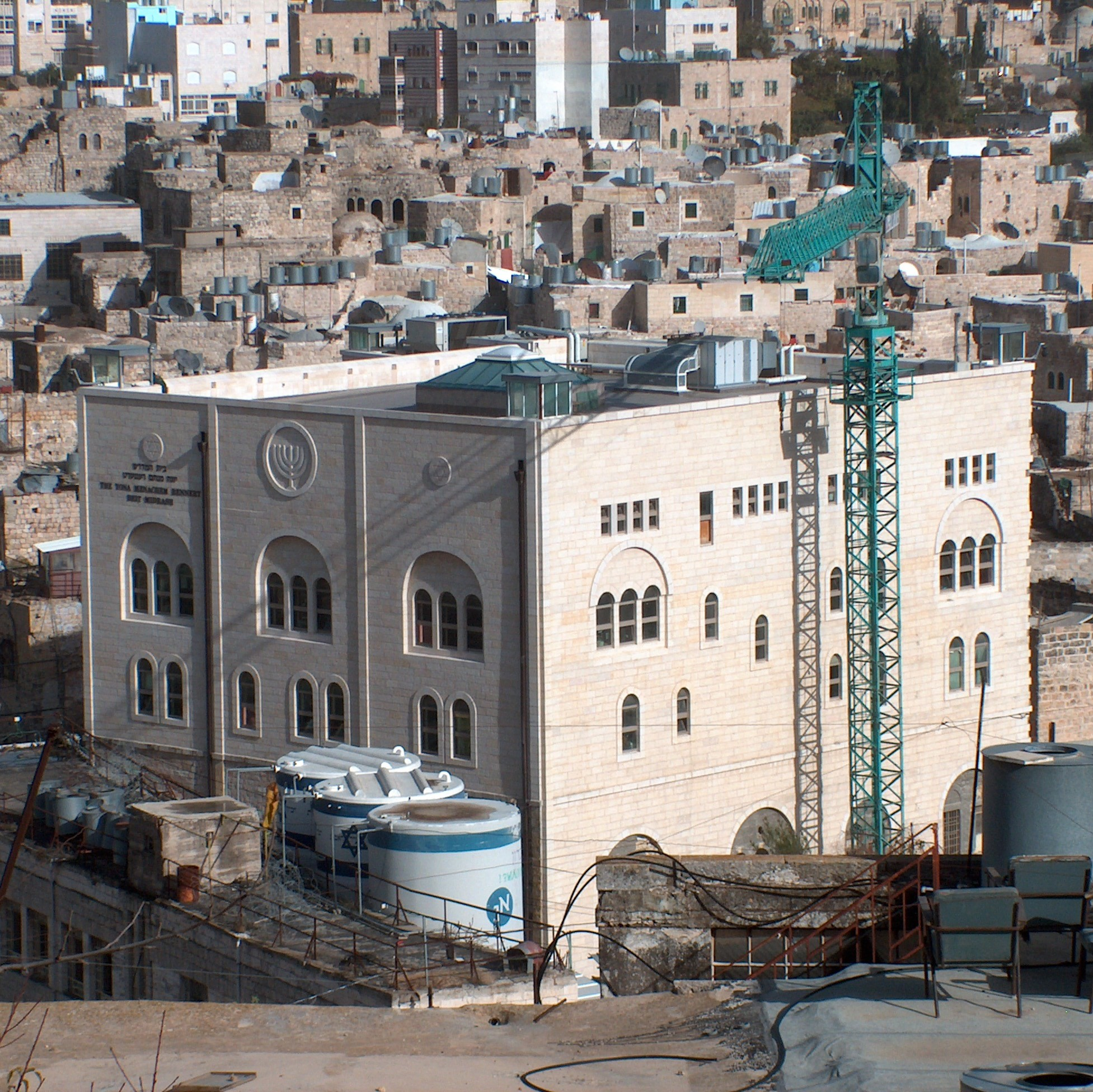
- Bait Romano, Hevron

Information
- Established: 1982
- Founder: Rabbi Moshe Blicher
- Enrollment: 400

Yeshivat Shavei Hevron (Hebrew: ישיבת שבי חברון, lit. 'Those who return to Hebron') is a Religious Zionist yeshiva located in the historic city of Hebron. Established in 1982, the yeshiva is housed in the nineteenth-century Beit Romano complex. It operates as both a Yeshiva Gedola and a Hesder yeshiva, combining intensive Talmudic and rabbinic studies with active military service in the Israel Defense Forces (IDF).

== History ==
The yeshiva is housed in Beit Romano, a historic multi-story complex built in 1881 by Chaim Yisrael Romano, a wealthy Jewish merchant from Constantinople. The building originally served as a residence and a hospitality center for Jewish pilgrims visiting Hebron. During the British Mandate period, the complex was seized by the authorities and utilized as a police station and court.

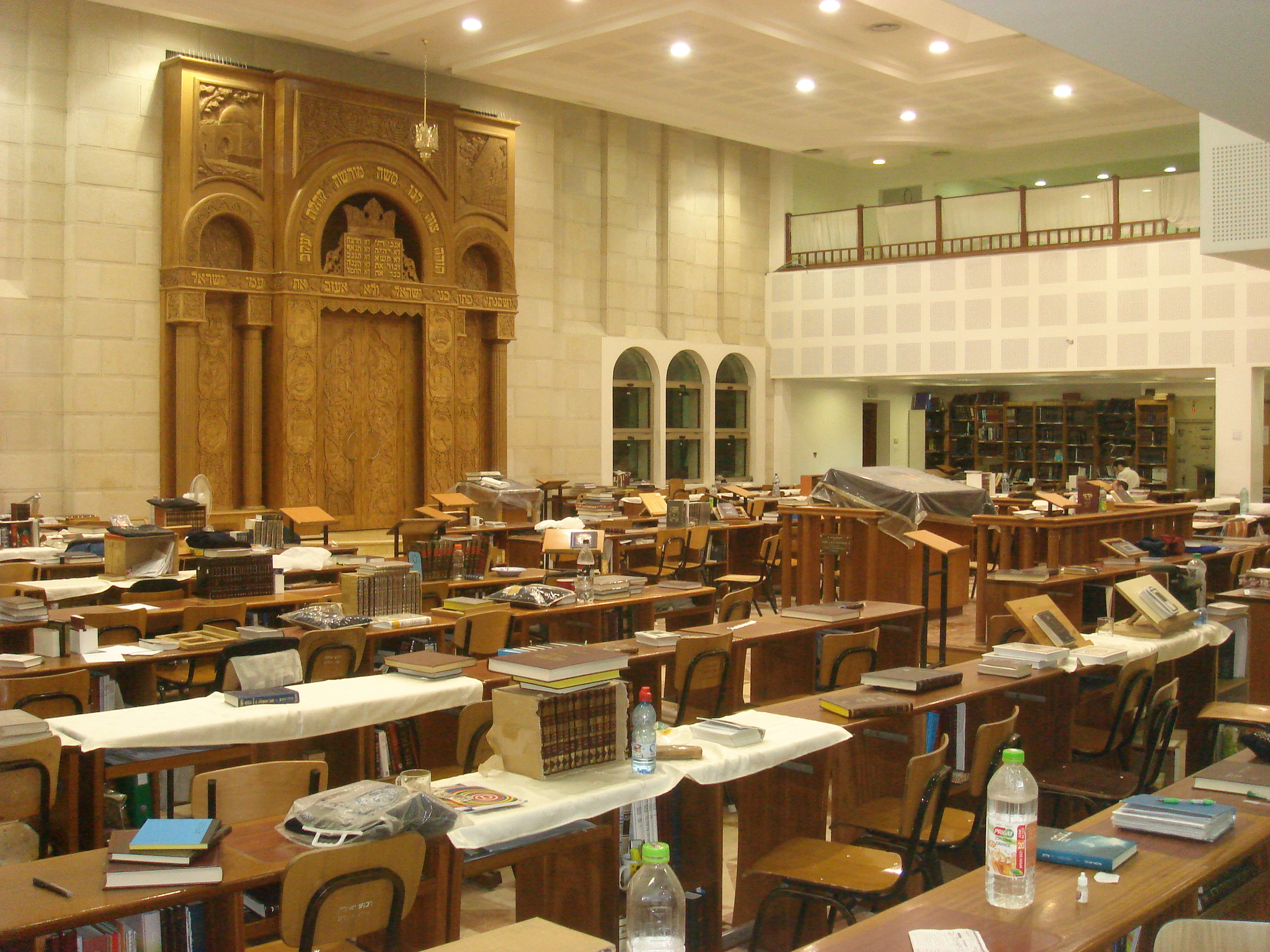
Yeshivat Shavey Hebron interior

The modern establishment of the yeshiva was directly catalyzed by the May 1980 Hebron terrorist attack, in which Palestinian militants ambushed and killed six Jewish students near the nearby Beit Hadassah building. In response to the attack, and as part of the initiative to revitalize the historic Jewish presence in Hebron, Rabbi Moshe Bleicher founded Yeshivat Shavei Hevron in 1982 within the reclaimed Beit Romano complex.

== Educational program and leadership ==
Yeshivat Shavei Hevron operates as a Religious Zionist yeshiva, functioning as both a Yeshiva Gedola and a Hesder yeshiva. The institution combines intensive Talmudic and rabbinic studies with active military service in the Israel Defense Forces.

The yeshiva is currently led by Rosh Yeshiva Rabbi Hananel Etrog and has an enrollment of approximately 400 students.

== Campus and facilifts ==
The yeshiva is centered in the historic Beit Romano complex. Over the years, the campus has undergone significant expansion and restoration to accommodate the growing student body. This includes the renovation of the original nineteenth-century Ottoman structure alongside the construction of modern dormitories, study halls, and dining facilities designed to preserve the architectural heritage of the site.
