= Dale Polakoff =

American Modern Orthodox Rabbi

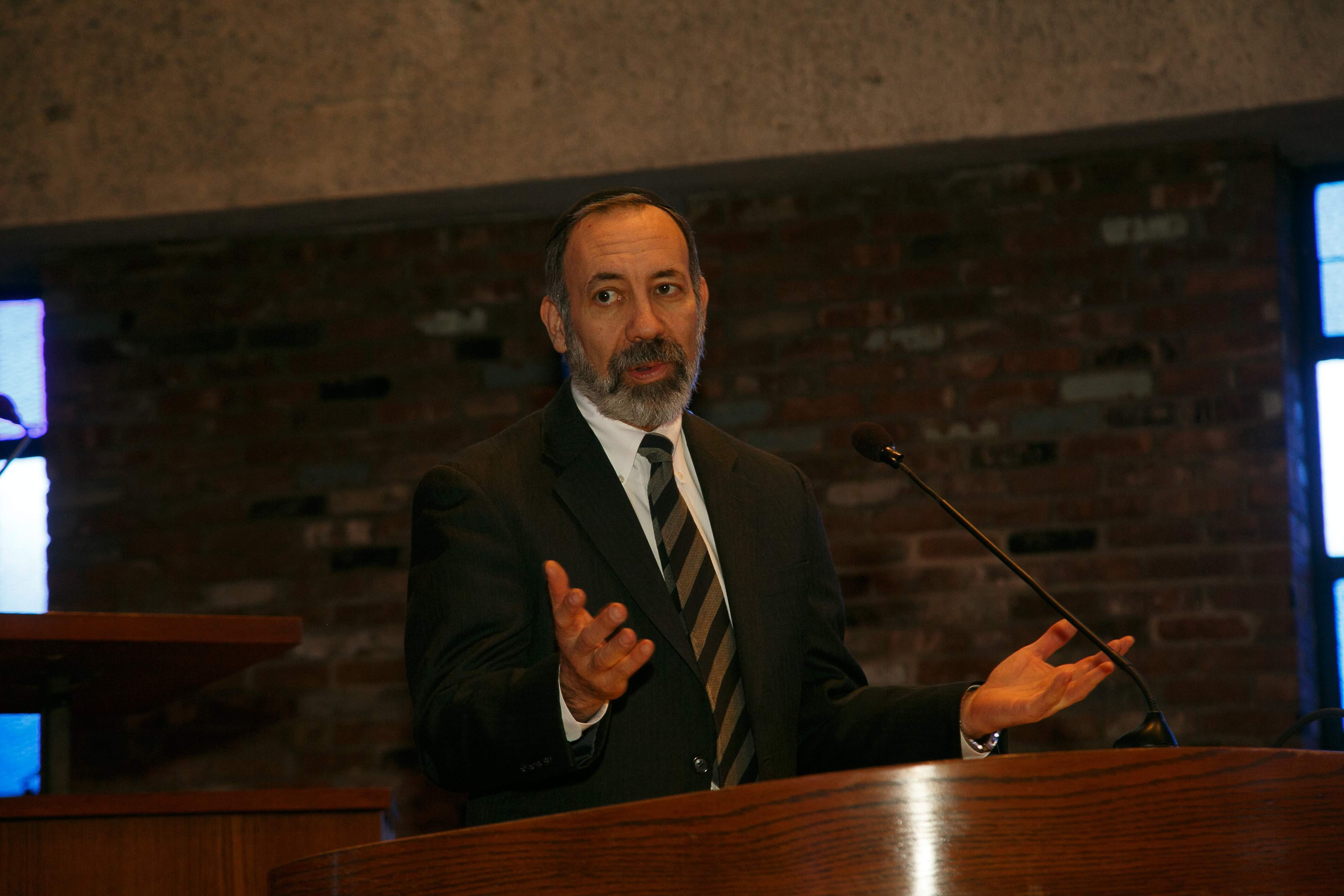
- Rabbi Dale Polakoff speaking at a Bar Mitzvah

Personal life
- Born: July 23, 1957 (age 68)
- Children: 9
- Education: Yeshiva University

Religious life
- Religion: Judaism
- Denomination: Modern Orthodox

Jewish leader
- Predecessor: Ephraim Wolf
- Synagogue: Great Neck Synagogue
- Position: Senior Rabbi
- Organisation: North Shore Hebrew Academy
- Residence: Great Neck, NY
- Semikhah: Rabbi Isaac Elchanan Theological Seminary

Dale Polakoff (born July 23, 1957) is an American Modern Orthodox Rabbi, teacher and spiritual leader. He has served as the senior rabbi of the Great Neck Synagogue for over 30 years and formerly served as President of the Rabbinical Council of America.

== Biography ==
Dale Polakoff was born in Philadelphia, Pennsylvania on July 23, 1957. He moved to New York for his undergraduate studies at Yeshiva University and graduated in 1979 with a bachelor's degree in psychology. He continued his learning at the Rabbi Isaac Elchanan Theological Seminary and was granted semicha (rabbinical ordination) in 1982, after having learned in the Gruss Kollel for several years, then headed by Rabbi Aharon Lichtenstein.

Polakoff's first rabbinic position was as assistant rabbi at Congregation Kehilath Jeshurun, where he also served as a faculty member of the Rabbi Joseph Lookstein Upper School of Ramaz. In 1988, Polakoff became senior rabbi of the Great Neck Synagogue in Great Neck, Long Island and a faculty member of the North Shore Hebrew Academy.

Polakoff served as president of the Rabbinical Council of America from 2005 to 2007. In September 2005, he testified to the United States Congress representing the Rabbinical Council of America in support of the nomination of John Roberts to the Supreme Court of the United States.

== Personal life ==
Polakoff resides in Great Neck, New York with his wife Ellen née Pinsker. He is a father of 9.
