= Nesanel Quinn =

American Haredi Jewish rabbi and educator

Rabbi Nesanel Quinn
- Rav Nesanel Quinn
- Title: Principal, Yeshiva Torah Vodaas

Personal life
- Born: Nesanel Quinn; 1910 New York City
- Died: 7 February 2005 (aged 94–95) Monsey, New York
- Education: Yeshiva Torah Vodaas

Religious life
- Religion: Judaism
- Denomination: Haredi
- Semikhah: Yeshiva Torah Vodaas

Nesanel Hakohen Quinn (1910 – 7 February 2005) was a Haredi Jewish rabbi and educator. He was connected with Yeshiva Torah Vodaas in Brooklyn, New York, for nearly 80 years, rising to menahel (director).

== Biography ==
Quinn's parents, Zalman Pinchas and Devorah Miriam Quinn, originally from Dvinsk, Latvia, emigrated to the United States where they had five children.

Quinn was a pupil at Yeshiva Torah Vodaas (the elementary school) and a student in the first class of Mesivta Torah Vodaath, founded by Rabbi Shraga Feivel Mendlowitz in 1926.

Quinn also learned under Rabbi Dovid Leibowitz, Rosh Yeshiva of Torah Vodaath. When Leibowitz left to start his own yeshiva, Yeshivas Rabbeinu Yisrael Meir HaKohen, Nesanel Quinn took charge of Torah Vodaath, along with Rabbi Gedalia Schorr.

In 1965 Quinn, along with Rabbi Zelik Epstein, established Camp Ohr Shraga, the successor to Mendlowitz's Camp Mesivta, which was the home of many American Gedolim during the summer months.

He died on 7 February 2005 (28 Shevat 5765) and was buried in the Monsey cemetery.
