= Ephraim Wolf =

American rabbi

Rabbi Dr. Ephraim Wolf

Personal life
- Born: July 11, 1921
- Died: March 6, 2004 (aged 82)
- Children: 2
- Education: Mesivta Torah Vodaath, Ner Israel Rabbinical College, Yeshiva Tifereth Israel

Religious life
- Religion: Judaism
- Denomination: Modern Orthodox Judaism

Jewish leader
- Successor: Rabbi Dale Polakoff
- Synagogue: Great Neck Synagogue
- Yeshiva: Yeshiva Torah Vodaath
- Position: Rabbi Emeritus
- Organisation: North Shore Hebrew Academy
- Yahrtzeit: 13 Adar 5764
- Residence: Great Neck, NY

Ephraim Reuven Wolf (Hebrew: אפרים ראובן וולף; July 11, 1921 – March 6, 2004) was an American Orthodox Rabbi and spiritual leader. He was active in the founding and growth of many Jewish educational and communal institutions.

== Biography ==
Wolf was born on July 11, 1921, to Nochum and Hinda Wolf. He studied at the Mesivta Torah Vodaath in Brooklyn, the Ner Israel Rabbinical College in Baltimore and at the Yeshiva Tifereth Israel in Israel.

His first rabbinical position was at the Young Israel of Malden, Massachusetts, where he founded the Beth Jacob Hebrew Academy. Subsequently, he served as rabbi of Congregation Ohav Zedek in Wilkes Barre, Pennsylvania, during which time he founded the Israel Ben Zion Academy in Pennsylvania. In 1956, Wolf became the spiritual leader of the Great Neck Synagogue. He served as the Rabbi and communal leader for over 30 years, from 1956 to 1988. He also served as principal of the North Shore Hebrew Academy as an extension of the synagogue, and helped it gain New York State accreditation. His efforts succeeded in establishing the Mikveh and the Eiruv as well as a Sephardic Minyan.

When the North Shore Hebrew Academy was first founded, Wolf laid the foundation for the new school, developed a competitive curriculum and recruited teachers. When the school could afford a mini-bus, Wolf drove it while there was no driver. Dale Polakoff stated, “Through his force of personality, Rabbi Wolf was able to give a legitimacy to Orthodoxy that Great Neck might otherwise not have had.” North Shore Hebrew Academy is a co-educational Yeshiva which now has over than 1,000 students from toddler through high school, on three campuses in Great Neck.

Wolf was active in the project of Zeirei Agudath Israel headed by Mike Tress, and worked hard to be Mekarev and recruit boys with less religious background and exposure to learn at Mesivta Torah Vodaath, then headed by Rabbi Shraga Feivel Mendlowitz.

At the beginning of Torah Umesorah in America, Wolf and a fellow student from Mesivta Torah Vodaath traveled from town to town, sleeping at night in railway stations to save money, as they scouted out possible communities for day schools.

Wolf died on March 6, 2004 (13 Adar 5764).

== Personal life ==
Wolf and his wife Elaine (née Miller) lived in Great Neck. They had two children.
