= Hillel Fendel =

- Born: Hillel Fendel; United States
- Education: Yeshivat Mercaz HaRav
- Occupations: Journalist, author, editor, rabbi
- Spouse: Bina Ehrenkranz
- Children: 8
- Relatives: Meyer Fendel (father); Dovid Fendel (brother); Zecharia Fendel (uncle); Alan Dershowitz (cousin)
- Writing career
- Period: 1990s–present
- Genres: Religious Zionism, Judaism, journalism
- Notable work: One Thing I Ask (1998)

Hillel Fendel (Hebrew: הלל פנדל) is an editor and author. For 16 years he worked as senior editor and co-founder of Arutz Sheva's "Israel National News". He has worked as a teacher and rabbi in the past.

Fendel has authored both news articles and op-eds on IsraelNationalNews.com. He currently co-authors a biweekly column in the Jewish Press on Jerusalem affairs.

Fendel authored a book on Jewish prayer entitled One Thing I Ask (Feldheim, June 1998). He wrote the book in both Hebrew and English editions.

He co-authored a book with his father Rabbi Meyer Fendel entitled Singing Our Song Again, and another with Yitzchak Herskovitz (also both Hebrew and English), and edited several books: Nine Men Wanted for a Minyan by his father, a biography of Rabbi She'ar Yashuv Cohen, a book by Professor Mordechai Rothenberg, and others. He translated several Hebrew books into English, including the six-volume "Borne Upon a Spirit" series by Rabbi Shabtai Sabato, a work on Chanukah by Professor Hagi Ben-Artzi, a Torah/science work on locusts by Rabbi Yoel Shvartz and Netanel Schorr, several works by Rabbi Matityahu Glazerson, and others.

== Personal life ==
Fendel is married to Bina (nee Ehrenkranz), and they have eight children and numerous grandchildren, all living in Israel. He is a son of Rabbi Meyer Fendel, founder of Hebrew Academy of Nassau County, and the late Goldie Fendel, and the brother of Rabbi Dovid Fendel, founder of the Hesder Yeshiva of Sderot. He is a nephew of Rabbi Zechariah Fendel, the late Orthodox Jewish educator and author, and grandson of Rabbi Yaakov Moshe Feldman, author and rabbi of Los Angeles, California. He is also a great-grandson of Zecharia Dershowitz, founder of one of the first Yiddish communities in America, and a grand-nephew of Louis Dershowitz, one of the original founders of Yeshiva Torah Vodaath of Brooklyn, NY. He attended Hebrew Academy of Nassau County, and then Netiv Meir Yeshiva High School and Yeshivat Mercaz HaRav, both in Jerusalem.
