= Malochim =

Malochim may refer to:

- Malachim (Hasidic group)
- Mal'achim, Hebrew for Angels
