= Shachne Zohn =

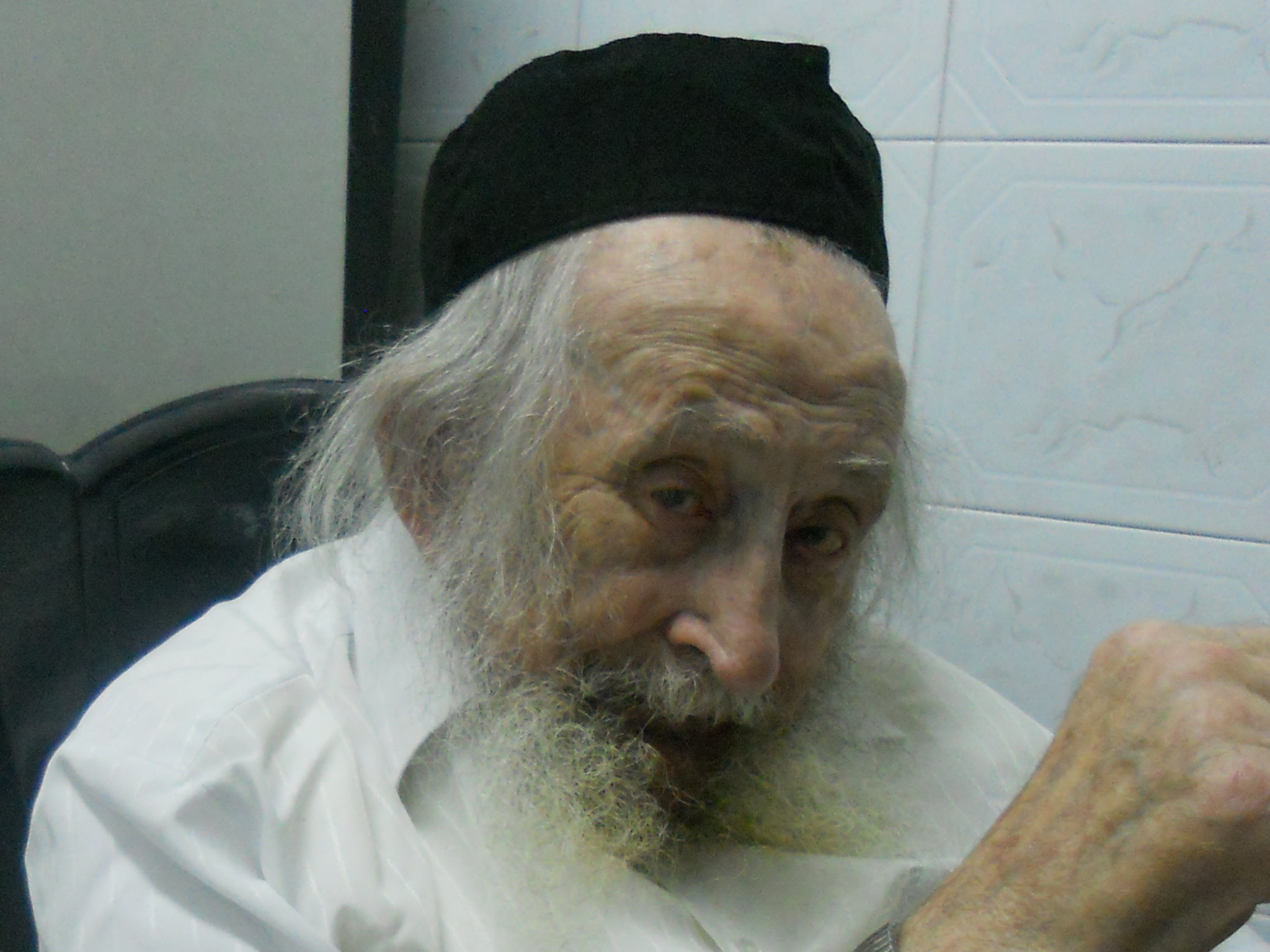
Sholom Shachne Zohn

Rabbi Sholom Shachne Zohn (Hebrew: שלום שכנה זוהן; 1910–2012) was a former dean of the Yeshiva Torah Vodaas, who later lived in Jerusalem, Israel.

== Biography ==
Shachne was born near Medzhybizh. When he was a young child, he moved with his family to the United States. When he was 13 years of age he began to receive religious training in the Mordechai Rosenblatt Talmud Torah while also attending public school on the East Side of Manhattan. His father was very busy with his cap business, and so he entrusted Rabbi Yaakov Yosef Herman with the religious upbringing of young Shachna. Rabbi Herman eventually convinced the lad to study at the Yeshiva in New Haven, Connecticut where a young Chaim Pinchas Scheinberg also studied at Rabbi Herman's behest.

In his youth, he briefly studied Talmud in Yeshiva University and before traveling to Europe to study under Rabbi Boruch Ber Leibowitz in the Yeshiva in Kaminetz and then in Mir Yeshiva. While in Europe, he married Liba Gulevsky. Before returning to America, Rabbi Zohn developed a close student relationship with the Jewish rabbinical leader of the time, Rabbi Israel Meir Kagan. Upon returning to America in anticipation of the Holocaust, he assumed a position in Torah Vodaas (in Brooklyn) as a professor of Talmud, eventually becoming one of the school's deans. Eventually, Rabbi Zohn retired from his position in Torah Vodaas to immigrate to Israel. There, Rabbi Schachne Zohn headed, for forty years, Kollel Kodshim V'Taharos, a study group for adult men in Jerusalem which analyzed sacrificial laws in a Talmudic context. He lived in the Ezrat Torah neighborhood of Jerusalem.

In the summer of 2008, Rabbi Shachna Zohn reported that he saw his former teacher Rabbi Israel Meir Kagan (under whom he studied Torah in pre-Holocaust Europe) in a dream and was told that the Geulah (Hebrew for Redemption) is imminent. This fact was publicized by Rabbi Tzvi Mayer Zilberberg and was later confirmed by Mishpacha Magazine.

Rabbi Zohn died on December 20, 2012 (8 Tevet, 5773). He is buried on the Mount of Olives in Old American Chelka near other prominent American Rabbis.

Rabbi Shachne Zohn's son, Rabbi Elchonon Zohn, is the Founder and Director of the Chevra Kadisha of the Rabbinical Council of Queens since 1981.

== Works ==
- Kuntres K'vod Torah
- Pirkei Teshuva Ug'ula
- Ateres Yaakov (on Amazon)
