= Svetlice =

Municipality in Prešov Region, Slovakia

- Municipality
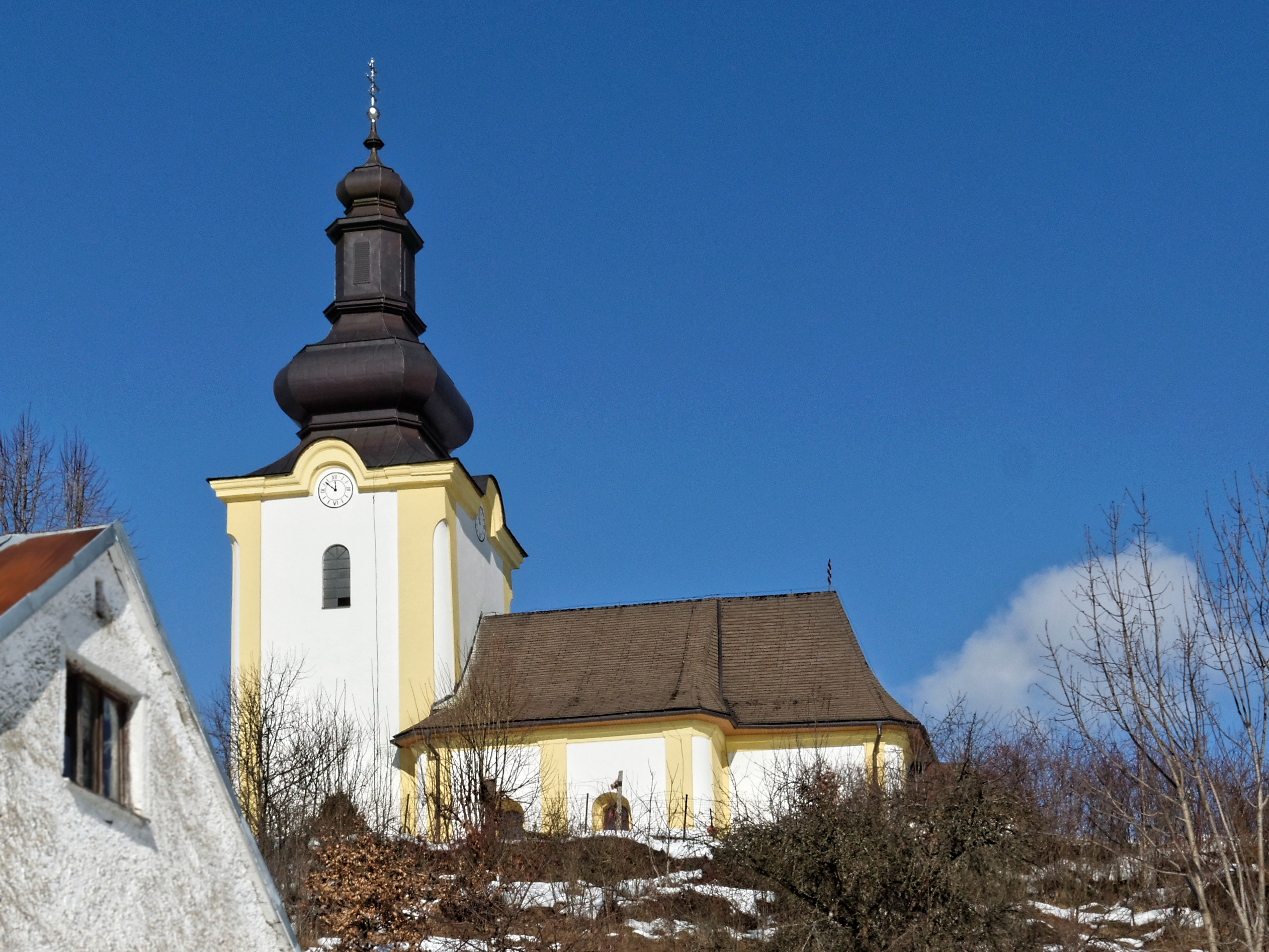

- Flag

- Location of Svetlice in the Prešov Region Location of Svetlice in Slovakia
- Coordinates: 49.17°N 22.03°E
- Country: Slovakia
- Region: Prešov Region
- District: Medzilaborce District
- First mentioned: 1557

Area
  - Total: 31.64 km^{2} (12.22 sq mi)
- Elevation: 326 m (1,070 ft)

Population (2025)
  - Total: 77
- Time zone: UTC+1 (CET)
  - Summer (DST): UTC+2 (CEST)
- Postal code: 671 5
- Area code: +421 57
- Vehicle registration plate (until 2022): ML
- Website: www.obecsvetlice.sk

Svetlice (Rusyn: Светліцї, Hungarian: Világ) is a village and municipality in the Medzilaborce District in the Prešov Region of far north-eastern Slovakia.

== History ==
In historical records the village was first mentioned in 1557. Before the establishment of independent Czechoslovakia in 1918, it was part of Zemplén County within the Kingdom of Hungary.

== Geography ==
The municipality lies at an altitude of 326 metres (1,070 ft) and covers an area of 31.64 km^{2} (12.22 sq mi) (2025).

Notable spots for sightseeing include Svetlice's Greek Catholic Church built in the 1700s and the Bell tower built in the 1800s.

== Population ==
Population statistic (10 years)
Year	1995	2005	2015	2025
Count	209	150	106	77
Difference		−28.22%	−29.33%	−27.35%

Population statistic
Year	2024	2025
Count	80	77
Difference		−3.75%

It has a population of 77 people (31 December 2025).

=== Ethnicity ===
Census 2021 (1+ %)
Ethnicity	Number	Fraction
Slovak	59	66.29%
Rusyn	53	59.55%
Not found out	3	3.37%
Ukrainian	2	2.24%
Total	89	

In year 2021 was 89 people by ethnicity 59 as Slovak, 53 as Rusyn, 3 as Not found out and 2 as Ukrainian.

Note on population: The difference values of population numbers in the table "Population statistic" and in the sections "Ethnicity" & "Religion" is caused by the use of various statistical methods.

=== Religion ===
Census 2021 (1+ %)
Religion	Number	Fraction
Greek Catholic Church	54	60.67%
Roman Catholic Church	16	17.98%
Eastern Orthodox Church	7	7.87%
None	7	7.87%
Not found out	3	3.37%
Jehovah's Witnesses	2	2.25%
Total	89	

In year 2021 was 89 people by religion 54 from Greek Catholic Church, 16 from Roman Catholic Church, 7 from Eastern Orthodox Church, 7 from None, 3 from Not found out and 2 from Jehovah's Witnesses.

== People ==
- Shraga Feivel Mendlowitz, haredi rabbi
