= Benjamin Blech =

American Orthodox rabbi, thinker, author and speaker

Rabbi Benjamin Blech

Personal life
- Born: 1933 (age 92–93) Zurich, Switzerland
- Spouse: Elaine
- Parent(s): Benzion and Gittel Blech
- Education: Yeshiva University; Columbia University
- Website: www.rabbibenjaminblech.com

Religious life
- Religion: Judaism
- Denomination: Orthodox
- Profession: Rabbi; Professor of Talmud author speaker

Jewish leader
- Position: Rabbi Emeritus
- Synagogue: Young Israel of Oceanside
- Yeshiva: Yeshiva University
- Residence: New York City, United States
- Semikhah: Rabbi Isaac Elchanan Theological Seminary (RIETS)

Benjamin Blech (born 1933) is an American Orthodox rabbi. He is a Professor of Talmud at Yeshiva University where he has taught since 1966, and was the rabbi of Young Israel of Oceanside for 37 years. In addition to his work in the rabbinate, Blech has written many books on Judaism and the Jewish people and speaks on Jewish topics to communities around the world.

== Early life and education ==
Benjamin Blech was born in Zurich. He attended Mesivta Toras Emes and Yeshiva Torah Vodaas in Brooklyn for high school, and spent summers learning at the Lakewood Yeshiva. He received a Bachelor of Arts degree from Yeshiva University, a Master of Arts degree in social psychology from Columbia University, and rabbinic ordination from the Rabbi Isaac Elchanan Theological Seminary.

== Career ==
Blech is the author of fourteen books with combined sales of close to half a million copies, including three as part of the highly popular Idiot's Guide series. His book Understanding Judaism: The Basics of Deed and Creed was chosen by the Union of Orthodox Jewish Congregations as "the single best book on Judaism in our generation". Together with an accompanying six-hour video, filmed by the producers of 20/20, featuring Blech, it is used as the basis for study groups in numerous synagogues and universities around the country.

In the 1980s, Blech was asked by the Lubavitcher Rebbe, Menachem Mendel Schneerson, to travel to the Far East on a speaking tour. Schneerson paid for all Blech's travel and hotel expenses for the duration of his trip.

At one point, Blech invested US$50,000 in the stock market, and over a number of years managed to turn it into $7 million, before he lost almost all of it. The experience was the catalyst for his 2003 book titled Taking Stock: A Spiritual Guide to Rising Above Life's Financial Ups and Downs.

In January 2005, Blech, along with Rabbis Barry Dov Schwartz and Jack Bemporad, became the first rabbis in history to publicly confer a blessing on a pope, when they were invited by the Vatican to visit and bless Pope John Paul II at Clementine Hall in the Apostolic Palace.

== Personal life ==
Blech resides in New York City.

In 2010, Blech was diagnosed with cardiac amyloidosis and given six months to live. In what he considers a gift from God, Blech survived.

== Published works ==
- Understanding Judaism: The Basics of Deed and Creed. KTAV. January 1991. ISBN 978-0-87668-291-3.
- The Secrets of Hebrew Words. Jason Aronson. August 1991. ISBN 978-0-87668-610-2.
- More Secrets of Hebrew Words: Holy Days and Happy Days. Jason Aronson. January 1993. ISBN 978-0-87668-223-4.
- The Complete Idiot's Guide to Jewish History and Culture. Alpha. December 1998. ISBN 978-0-02-862711-3.
- Your Name Is Your Blessing: Hebrew Names and Their Mystical Meanings. Jason Aronson. June 1999. ISBN 978-0-7657-6053-1.
- The Complete Idiot's Guide to Understanding Judaism. Alpha. August 1999. ISBN 978-0-02-863191-2.
- The Complete Idiot's Guide to Learning Yiddish. Alpha. January 2000. ISBN 978-0-02-863387-9.
- Taking Stock: A Spiritual Guide to Rising Above Life's Financial Ups and Downs. Amacom Books. March 2003. ISBN 978-0-8144-0787-5.
- If God Is Good, Why Is The World So Bad?. Simcha Press. September 2003. ISBN 978-0-7573-0123-0.
- The Book of Passover: A Celebration. Citadel. March 2005. ISBN 978-0-8065-2580-8.
- The Book of Passover. Citadel. March 2006. ISBN 978-0-8065-2737-6.
- Eyewitness to Jewish History. John Wiley & Sons. March 2007. ISBN 978-0-470-05313-3.
- The Sistine Secrets: Michelangelo's Forbidden Messages in the Heart of the Vatican. HarperOne. April 2008. ISBN 978-0-06-146904-6., with Roy Doliner
- Redemption, Then and Now: Pesah Haggada. Menorah Books. April 2007. ISBN 978-1940516738.

== See also ==
- List of Orthodox Rabbis
