= Yisroel Belsky =

American rabbi and posek (1938–2016)

Rabbi Chaim Yisroel HaLevi Belsky
- Rabbi Belsky in Camp Agudah
- Born: August 22, 1938; New York
- Died: January 28, 2016 (aged 77) (after sunset); New York
- Occupations: Rosh yeshiva posek
- Spouse: Miriam Belsky
- Parent(s): Berel and Chana Belsky

Chaim Yisroel HaLevi Belsky (August 22, 1938 – January 28, 2016) was an American rabbi and posek of Orthodox and Haredi Judaism. He was one of the roshei yeshiva (deans) at Yeshiva Torah Vodaas, and rabbi of the summer camp network run by Agudath Israel of America.

Belsky served for more than 28 years as a senior kashrut advisor to the Orthodox Union (OU).

== Early life and education ==
Yisroel Belsky was the son of Berel and Chana Tzirel Belsky. His maternal grandfather was Binyomin Wilhelm, a founder of Yeshiva Torah Vodaas in Brooklyn, New York.

In 1962, Belsky received his semikhah (rabbinical ordination) from Yeshiva Torah Vodaas, and again in 1965, when he received it from Moshe Feinstein. Beginning at age 17, he studied at Beth Medrash Elyon in Monsey, New York under Yaakov Kamenetsky. Belsky would later go on to lead Torah Vodaas himself as its rosh yeshiva (dean).

== Rabbinical career ==
Belsky served as a member of the Iggud HaRabbonim beth din (religious court) under Yitzchok Isaac Liebes, Baruch Leizerowski and Herschel Kurzrock. Some events that he addressed with this beth din were: the aftermath of the September 11 attacks and freeing its widows from agunah status; New York City tap water; human-hair wigs from India; surrogate motherhood; and a kashrut scandal in Monsey.

Belsky's first kashrut position was with the Kof-K. In 1987, he transferred to the Orthodox Union (OU), eventually being described as one of their "chief experts", and ultimately served in that capacity for more than 28 years. In 2004, Belsky ruled that water that might contain microscopic nonkosher organisms is kosher even if it is unfiltered. That same year, he ruled that "gruesome" slaughtering of animals at Agriprocessors, then the largest glatt kosher meat producer in the United States, appeared not to violate kosher laws as long as the animal "felt nothing". He later ruled on a kashrut scandal surrounding Doheny Meats, which had been videoed violating the laws of kashrut, saying that food that had been sold by Doheny prior to the scandal could still be considered kosher.

Belsky served as rabbi of the summer camp network run by Agudath Israel of America. In September 2005, he was the keynote speaker at the Igud Horabbonim Annual Siyum HaShas. The event doubled as the chag ha'semikhah, where 35 of Belsky's students received their rabbinical ordination certificates.

== Controversies ==
Belsky publicly defended confessed sexual abuser Yosef Kolko, who taught children at a Lakewood, New Jersey, yeshiva. Further, he condemned the victim and his parents for reporting the sexual abuse to the police, and wrote that one who does so "has no share in the world to come." Belsky was criticized for his actions in this regard. According to The Jewish Week, the Ocean County, New Jersey District Attorney privately warned Belsky to cease and desist writing letters defending Kolko, or risk prosecution. Belsky later clarified his position in a letter to the Rabbinical Council of America:

Though some have misunderstood my position, I completely agree that, given firsthand knowledge or credible evidence of child abuse or molestation, one should definitely go to the authorities. This is not only a theoretical position that I hold, but also one that I have personally implemented.

According to court documents, Belsky was alleged to have served on a beth din together with Mendel Epstein and Martin Wolmark which approved the use of physical violence against Jews who were civilly divorced, yet refused to give a get (Jewish divorce document) to their wives.

In 2000, Belsky sided against rabbis in Borough Park, Brooklyn who established a controversial eruv, referring to them as amateurs and populists.

In a 2011 interview with The New York Times about a divorce case, Belsky described a court-ordered child custody order as "a joke" since it interfered with observance of the Jewish Sabbath.

== Personal life ==
Belsky resided in Brooklyn. In 2012, he suffered a serious medical emergency. At that time, the name Chaim was added to his name. After his recovery, he returned to Yeshiva Torah Vodaas. In 2013, the annual Yeshiva dinner honored Belsky and highlighted 50 young men who earned semikhah from him.

Belsky was re-hospitalized in January 2016 and he died during the evening of January 28, 2016, which corresponded to the Hebrew calendar date of 19 Shevat.

== Works ==
- Piske halakhot (Brooklyn 2002) - responsa
- Einei Yisroel on Chumash (currently Bereishis, Shemos, Vayikra, and Devarim) (Kiryat Sefer 2005, 2006, 2011, and 2008 respectively) - Lectures edited and adapted by Moshe Armel and Reuven Mathieson
- Sha'alos U'Teshuvos Shulchan Halevi, questions and answers on a wide variety of topics, (Kiryat Sefer 2008)
- Rav Belsky on Alternative Medicine (Jerusalem 2018)
