= Dershowitz =

Dershowitz and Dershwitz is a surname. Notable people with the surname include:

- Alan Dershowitz (born 1938), American lawyer, jurist, writer and political commentator
- Eli Dershwitz (born 1995), American Olympic saber fencer, world champion, junior world champion
- Elon Dershowitz (1961–2025), American film producer
- Nachum Dershowitz (born 1951), Israeli computer scientist
- Zecharia Dershowitz (1859–1921), founder of one of the first Yiddish communities in America
- Zvi Dershowitz (1928–2023), American rabbi
