= Gedalia Schorr =

American rabbi and philosopher

Rabbi Gedalia Schorr

Gedalyahu HaLevi Schorr (27 November 1910 – 2 July 1979; 7 Tammuz 5739), also known as Gedalia Schorr, was a prominent rabbi and rosh yeshiva. He was called the "first American Gadol" (Torah giant) by Rabbi Aharon Kotler. Rabbi Meir Shapiro, the rosh yeshiva of Chachmei Lublin, remarked that Rabbi Schorr had the most brilliant mind he ever encountered in America, and one of the most brilliant in the entire world. He said this when Rabbi Schorr was only nineteen years old.

== Early years ==
Schorr was born in Ustrzyki Dolne, Poland, [Yiddish: Istrik] a shtetl near Przemyśl, in 1910, the sixth of Avraham Halevi Schorr's seven children. He was named after his paternal grandfather, Gedalyahu, a highly respected scholar and close Hasid of the Sadigerer Rebbe, a descendant of Yisrael of Rizhin.

The Schorr family came to the United States in 1922, settling first on the Lower East Side and then moving to Williamsburg, Brooklyn. Gedalia dedicated himself to learning with a passion that he maintained throughout his life. He soon caught the eye of Shraga Feivel Mendlowitz, principal of Mesivta Torah Vodaas. In Yeshiva, Gedalia studied under HaGaon HaRav Dovid Leibowtz zt”l.

== Torah Vodaas and Kletzk ==
When Rabbi Schorr was only twenty-one years old, Rabbi Mendlowitz appointed him to conduct the highest class in Mesivta Torah Vodaas. In later years, when Rabbi Shlomo Heiman, rosh yeshiva of Yeshiva Torah Vodaas, became ill and was unable to carry on his duties for a year and a half, Rabbi Heiman asked that Rabbi Schorr replace him for the duration of the illness.

After his marriage to Shifra Isbee in 1938, Rabbi Schorr left Torah Vodaas, accompanied by his wife, to study in the Kletzk yeshiva under Rabbi Aharon Kotler. When World War II was dawning, Rabbi Schorr, under pressure from his family and the U.S. Consul in Poland, returned to America again.

After Rabbi Mendlowitz died in 1948, Rabbi Schorr was appointed principal of Torah Vodaas in his stead. He began functioning as rosh yeshivah in 1958 after the death of Rosh Yeshiva Rabbi Reuven Grozovsky, delivering weekly classes in Beth Medrash Elyon.

=== Legacy ===
From 1970 until his death, he served as a member of the presidium of Agudath Israel of America. A sampling of his shiurim on the Torah can be found in the sefer Ohr Gedalyahu (Light of Gedalyahu), a compendium of novel and lucid discourses on Jewish thought that he delivered in the last three years of his life. He died in Brooklyn, New York, on July 2, 1979 and was interred on the Mount of Olives (Har HaZeisim). He was survived by his wife, who died in 2004, and by four sons and four daughters.

== Personal life ==
Schorr had four sons and four daughters.
