= Yisroel Reisman =

American Orthodox rabbi

Rabbi Yisroel Reisman
- Reisman (seated) at a celebratory function with a student and his teacher at Yeshiva Torah Vodaas c. 2026
- Title: Rosh yeshiva

Personal life
- Spouse: Esther Reisman
- Parent(s): Avraham and Marylin Reisman
- Education: Yeshiva Torah Vodaas

Religious life
- Religion: Judaism

Jewish leader
- Synagogue: Agudath Yisroel of Madison
- Yeshiva: Yeshiva Torah Vodaas
- Organization: Agudas Yisroel
- Other: Talmudic scholar
- Residence: Brooklyn
- Semikhah: Avraham Yaakov Pam

Yisroel Reisman (Hebrew: ישראל הלוי רייזמן) is an American rabbi and posek (scholar of Jewish law) of Orthodox and Haredi Judaism who resides in Brooklyn, New York.

== Career ==
Reisman serves as the rabbi of the Agudath Israel of Madison, in Brooklyn, New York.

Reisman is one of the roshei yeshiva (deans) at Yeshiva Torah Vodaas, where he received semikhah (rabbinical ordination), training under Rabbi Avrohom Pam. He is the rabbi of the summer camp network run by Agudath Israel of America. Reisman is the author of several books on halakha (Jewish law) and Tanach (the Jewish bible).

Reisman began a Saturday night lecture series in 1987 on Navi (biblical prophets), which has since become a phenomenon. Beginning with an audience of only about 20 participants, the shiur currently attracts over 1,000 attendees and is broadcast around the world each week.

== Views ==
In 2018, when the New York State Education Department issued a directive to all yeshivas operating in New York to come into compliance with statewide educational standards, Reisman co-authored an op-ed with Elya Brudny in the Wall Street Journal voicing their opposition to the guidelines.

Reisman believes that the future of the Jewish people is in Israel, and that the Jews who remain in the diaspora should support Torah study there.
