= Yeshiva Torah Vodaas =

American Haredi yeshiva in Brooklyn, New York

Coordinates: 40°38′17.56″N 73°58′9.54″W

- ישיבת תורה ודעת

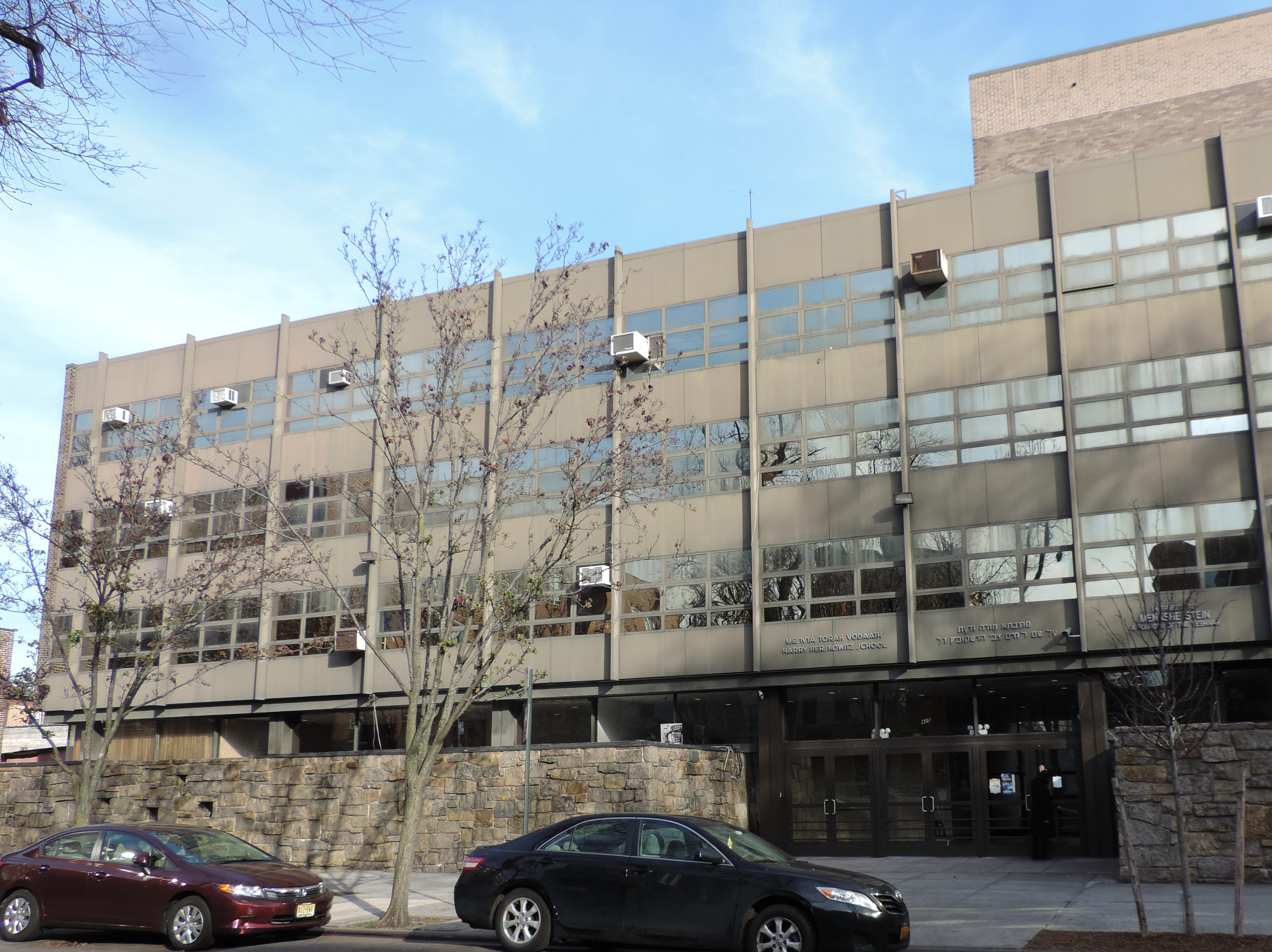
- Harry Herskowitz School, home to the Torah Vodaas Mesivta

Location
- 425 East 9th Street; Brooklyn, New York; United States

Information
- Denomination: Haredi Judaism
- Established: 1918; 108 years ago
- Roshei yeshiva: Yitzchok Lichtenstein; Yisroel Reisman; Yosef Savitsky
- Website: torahvodaath.org

Yeshiva Torah Vodaas (or Yeshiva and Mesivta Torah Vodaath or Yeshiva Torah Vodaath or Torah Vodaath Rabbinical Seminary) is a yeshiva in the Flatbush neighborhood of Brooklyn, New York.

== History ==
The yeshiva was conceived in 1917 and formally opened in 1918, by Binyomin Wilhelm and Louis Dershowitz, to provide a yeshiva education to the children of families then moving from the Lower East Side to the Williamsburg section of Brooklyn. The two friends and Rabbi Zev Gold of the local Congregation Beth Jacob Anshe Sholom formed a board and established the yeshiva on Keap Street in Williamsburg as an elementary school. The yeshiva later moved to a new building at 206 Wilson Street and remained there until 1967, while the elementary school remained at 206 Wilson St. until 1974 when it moved to East 9th Street in Brooklyn. The school was named after a yeshiva founded in Lida in 1905 by Rabbi Yitzchak Yaacov Reines, which combined secular studies with Jewish studies and traditional Talmud study. During this period the yeshiva was modeled after those in Europe, with religious studies taught in Yiddish and Talmud taught in the style of the European yeshivas.

Shraga Feivel Mendlowitz headed the yeshiva from 1922 to 1948. A mesivta (yeshiva high school) was opened in 1926 and later a rabbinical seminary (yeshiva gedolah). Rabbi Dovid Leibowitz, a Torah scholar from Europe, headed the yeshiva's beit midrash (study hall) from 1929 but left after four years to start his own yeshiva (Yeshivas Chofetz Chaim) after conflicts with Mendlowitz. Two years later, in 1935, Rabbi Shlomo Heiman became rosh yeshiva (head of the yeshiva), a position he held until his death in 1944.

After Mendlowitz died in 1948, rabbis Yaakov Kamenetzky and Refael Reuvain Grozovsky became roshei yeshiva.

The yeshiva has since expanded to include a beit midrash in Monsey, an elementary school division in nearby Marine Park, and two summer camps. The student body from nursery to postgraduate kollel, numbered nearly 2,000 students in 2012.

== Philosophy ==
"Torah im Derech Eretz" historically influenced the yeshiva's philosophy, but today it is strongly influenced by the Haredi philosophy. However, Torah Vodaath is one of the many major haredi yeshivas that allow its students to attend college while studying at the yeshiva. The great majority of the yeshiva's graduates go on to work in fields that are not related to the Torah education that they received in yeshiva.

== Roshei Yeshiva ==
The three roshei yeshiva as of 2018 were rabbis Yisroel Reisman, Yosef Savitsky, and Yitzchok Lichtenstein.

The previous roshei yeshiva include rabbis Shraga Feivel Mendlowitz, Yisroel Belsky, Avraham Yaakov Pam, Shlomo Heiman, Dovid Leibowitz, Yaakov Kamenetsky, Shachne Zohn, Zelik Epstein, Gedalia Schorr, Elya Chazan, Reuvain Fein, Simcha Sheps, Moshe Rosen (Nezer HaKodesh), and Reuvain Grozovsky.

== Notable alumni ==
- Milton Balkany, Republican political activist and fundraiser
- Professor Joseph M. Baumgarten, Dead Sea Scrolls scholar
- Rabbi Saul Berman, American scholar and Modern Orthodox rabbi
- Rabbi Professor Benjamin Blech, Professor of Talmud at Yeshiva University
- Rabbi J. David Bleich, Rosh Yeshiva in Rabbi Isaac Elchanan Theological Seminary of Yeshiva University
- Rabbi Shlomo Carlebach, composer, singer, spiritual leader, pioneer of the Baal teshuva movement
- Noach Dear (1953–2020), New York Supreme Court Judge
- Rabbi Zvi Dershowitz, Conservative rabbi
- David G. Greenfield, politician and Chair of New York City Council's Land Use Committee from 2013-2017
- Rabbi Moshe Heinemann, Rabbinical Supervisor, Star-K and Rav of Agudas Yisroel of Baltimore
- Rabbi Levi Yitzchak Horowitz, the Bostoner Rebbe
- Rabbi Yakov Horowitz, educator and child safety advocate
- Rabbi Shmuel Kamenetsky, Rosh Yeshiva of the Talmudical Yeshiva of Philadelphia
- Rabbi Aryeh Kaplan, rabbi, Jewish thinker and author of over 40 works.
- Rabbi Sholom Klass, rabbi, publisher of The Jewish Press
- Professor David Kranzler historian of Rescue by Jews during the Holocaust
- Rabbi Dr. Norman Lamm, rabbi, chancellor of Yeshiva University
- Rabbi Bernard Levy, rabbi, head of OK Labs
- Rabbi Yerucham Olshin, a Rosh Yeshiva of Beth Medrash Govoha, Lakewood, New Jersey
- Rabbi Avraham Yaakov Pam, later Rosh Yeshiva of the Yeshiva (see above)
- Rabbi Nesanel Quinn, later Menahel of the Yeshiva
- Rabbi Yisroel Reisman, today Rosh Yeshiva of the Yeshiva, and Rabbi of Agudath Yisroel of Madison
- Rabbi Sholom Rivkin, chief rabbi of St. Louis, Missouri
- Rabbi Zvi Aryeh Rosenfeld, Polish–American rabbi and educator associated with the Breslov Hasidic movement
- Rabbi Yitzchok Scheiner, Rosh Yeshiva of the Kamenitz yeshiva of Jerusalem
- Ben Zion Shenker, renowned Hasidic composer and hazzan
- Rabbi Nosson Scherman, rabbi, owner and general editor of Artscroll
- Rabbi Gedalia Schorr, later Rosh Yeshiva of the Yeshiva (see above)
- Gene Simmons (Chaim Witz), aka The Demon, co-founder of the rock band Kiss
- Rabbi Elya Svei, Rosh Yeshiva of the Talmudical Yeshiva of Philadelphia
- Rabbi Yaakov Weinberg, Rosh Yeshiva of Yeshivas Ner Yisroel
- Rabbi Dr. Ephraim Wolf, recruited for the Yeshiva, founding Rabbi of the Great Neck Synagogue and the North Shore Hebrew Academy
- Michael Wyschogrod, Jewish philosopher and theologian
