= Beth Medrash Elyon =

Yeshiva in Monsey, New York

- בית מדרש עליון
- Type: Undergraduate, yeshiva
- Established: 1945
- Founder: Rabbi Shraga Feivel Mendelowitz
- Religious affiliation: Orthodox Judaism
- Rosh yeshiva: Rabbi Yisroel Mordechai Falk
- Location: Monsey, New York, 10952, United States; 41°6′50.5″N 74°4′10″W
- Former Rosh yeshivas: Rabbi Reuven Grozovsky; Rabbi Don Ungarischer

Beth Medrash Elyon is a four-year, not-for-profit yeshiva in Monsey, New York.

== History ==
In 1943, Rabbi Shraga Feivel Mendlowitz purchased a property in Monsey with the intention to raise the education level of Torah teachers. Named Aish Dos (Pillar of Fire), the institute comprised on two buildings on a sixteen-acre plot. Its first class comprised on thirty students. In 1944 it was reconstituted as Beth Medrash Elyon.

Though Beth Medrash Elyon closed in the 1970s for a period of time due to disagreements among the leaders of the yeshiva, it was subsequently reopened. It was headed by R' Don Ungarischer, the son in law of Refael Reuvain Grozovsky, until Ungarischer's death on October 30, 2011. Ungarischer's son-in-law, R' Yisroel Mordechai Falk, in turn, currently serves as Rosh Yeshiva.

Its past Roshei Yeshiva have included Rabbis Reuven Grozovsky, and Gedalia Schorr.

As of 2014, tuition was $7,800 per year, and room and board $2,800. The college used a semester calendar, and the student-to-faculty ratio was 8. Almost all students received some form of financial aid, and the average grant aid to undergrads was approximately $8,000.

== Alumni ==
Among Beth Medrash Elyon's graduates are Rabbis Yisroel Belsky, J.D. Bleich, Yosef Goldman, Nosson Scherman, Moshe Leib Rabinovich (current Munkatcher Rebbe), and Brooklyn Law School Professor Aaron Twerski. Dovid Schustal studied there and his father Rabbi Simcha Schustal was the Rosh kollel.
