= Binyomin Wilhelm =

- Born: June 14, 1886; Lodz, Poland
- Died: 1972
- Occupation(s): founder, Yeshiva Torah Vodaath (1918) founder, Mifal (1968)
- Spouse: Blima Wilhelm
- Parent: Abraham & Chana Wilhelm

Binyomin Wilhelm (1886–1972) was a founder of Yeshiva Torah Vodaas.

== Biography ==
Born in Lodz, Poland, Binyomin was the oldest son of a Radoshitzer chassidic family.

His mother died when he was eight years old, and he left Europe by himself in 1907 based on correspondence with a friend who preceded him to America.

He first peddled from a pushcart, until he had made enough money to rent a store. Within less than two years he had his own houseware business; the business still exists.

Binyomin married Bluma Weberman.

== Torah Vodaath ==
He moved to Williamsburg, Brooklyn, where he and his friend, Louis (Leibish) Dershowitz, wanted to open a yeshiva for boys. At that time, the few yeshivas that existed in the United States — Rabbi Jacob Joseph School, Etz Chaim Yeshiva, Yeshiva Rabbi Solomon Kluger — were all on the Lower East Side of Manhattan.

Wilhelm envisioned a yeshiva that taught secular studies in the afternoons. Wilhelm had to overcame large opposition to his type of yeshiva. Most parents did not want to send their children to yeshiva. There was also opposition from the other side. Some parents held that a yeshiva should be purely for Jewish studies. In the end he prevailed and founded in 1918 what would become known as 'the mother of all American yeshivos' - Yeshiva and Mesivta Torah Vodaath.

A major breakthrough was the later recruitment and hiring of a yet unknown man, whom Wilhelm uncovered, Rabbi 'Mr.' Shraga Feivel Mendelowitz. Together they built the first mesivta (Yeshiva High School) in New York and spurred the creation of Torah Umesorah.

Wilhelm was instrumental in the founding and stabilization of the first Bais Yaakov schools for girls and many other organizations.

Wilhelm was active in Torah Vodaath until his 80s, when he moved to Israel in 1968. There, he founded a network of afternoon programs for Sephardic youth in developing areas, which was to strengthen their commitment to Judaism. He called the network Mifal Torah Vodaath. This innovative program was one of the first Jewish outreach programs created.

== Belsky, Hershkowitz, Gewirtz branches ==
The Wilhelm family went on to become known as leaders on the Jewish communal scene in communities across the country and beyond.

Their daughter Chana married Rabbi Berel Belsky and in 1970 moved from Williamsburg to Kensington.; their son Yisroel Belsky, years later, became a rosh yeshiva of Yeshiva Torah Vodaath.

The Wilhelms' daughter Lea married Yona Zev Hershkowitz. Claire married Bernie Gewirtz.
