= Refael Reuvain Grozovsky =

Talmudic scholar & Rosh Yeshiva

Refael Reuvain Grozovsky (Belarusian: Рафаэль Гразоўскі; 1886, Minsk, Belarus – 1958, United States) was a leading Orthodox rabbi, Jewish religious leader and rosh yeshiva ("dean") known for his Talmudic analytical style.

== Early years ==
He was the son of Rabbi Shimshon Grozovsky, the leading dayan (Halachic judge) of Minsk. He attended Yeshiva Knesses Yisrael, known as the Slabodka yeshiva, and studied under Rabbis Moshe Mordechai Epstein and Nosson Tzvi Finkel. In 1919, Rabbi Grozovsky married the daughter of Rabbi Baruch Ber Lebowitz, whose analytical method of textual study continues to be extremely influential in modern-day yeshivas. After his marriage, Rabbi Grozovsky moved to the Vilna suburb of Lukishuk. Later, he moved with his father-in-law to Kaminetz and continued to learn at the yeshiva there (Knesset Beit Yitzhak) under the tutelage of his father-in-law, whom he considered his main teacher. Rabbi Grozovsky had two sons and two daughters. He eventually became the dean of the Kaminetz Yeshiva.

Rabbi Grozovsky was known to lead a simple and sparse life. Sometimes he and his wife had to borrow money from his students. They shared a cramped apartment with his wife's parents, both because of Grozovsky's modest way of life and his desire to learn as much as possible from his famous father-in-law.

== Life in America ==
During World War II, Rabbi Grozovsky escaped Europe and the Holocaust with a group of his students and arrived on the west coast of the United States. He then journeyed to New York City where he joined Rabbis Aharon Kotler and Avraham Kalmanowitz in leading the Vaad Hatzalah's efforts to save Jews from the Nazi Holocaust, including lobbying and fundraising. In the process, he also brought 110 members of the Kaminetz community to safety in America.

Rabbi Grozovsky was extremely active in the Agudath Israel of America organization. However, he preferred to work behind the scenes. His concern for the spiritual state of affairs in Israel was well known. He read many magazine and newspaper articles about Israel and asked students to translate articles written in English. As a result of his knowledge, in May 1951 he organized a public demonstration protesting the unilateral action of the Israeli government in involuntarily sending religious refugee children to anti-religious kibbutzim ("communes").

Rabbi Grozovsky was asked by Rabbi Shraga Feivel Mendlowitz to head the Yeshiva Torah Vodaas located in Brooklyn, New York. There he earned a reputation for incisive analytical reasoning combined with vast Talmudic knowledge and a humble and modest personality. Although he spent less than a year in this position, his influence on the Yeshiva belies the relatively short time he was associated with it.

Reb Reuvain's schedule would have worn out many men who were physically stronger. He arrived at Beth Medrash Elyon in Monsey, NY, every Thursday and remained awake all night preparing for the Friday Talmudic lecture. The same routine was followed the next night, when after his Shabbos meal, he would prepare for his Sunday afternoon lecture. He then returned to Brooklyn on Monday to present the same lecture, modified for his different audience, on Tuesday.

Six years before his death, he was struck by a car under suspicious circumstances [Rumour has it was the butcher meat mafia who arranged it, though there were other suspects]. He then suffered a stroke which impaired his physical functioning. Nonetheless, the Rosh Yeshiva remained mentally alert and was able to study until his death in 1958. He was survived by his sons, Rabbi Chaim Grozovsky and rabbi Shamshon Grozovsky and his sons-in-law, Rabbis Don Ungarischer (Rosh Yeshiva of Beth Medrash Elyon) and Levi Krupenia.

== Talmudic method ==
The thrust of Rav Grozovsky's method of Talmudic analysis was an emphasis on extreme thoroughness. This manifested in two areas:

1. Thoroughness of thought: the cornerstone of his methodology was the application of the maximum effort of thought into all ideas being studied in the Talmud and the related rabbinical literature and finding the underpinnings of even "simple" ideas. Rabbi Grozovsky taught that the casual acceptance of seemingly "simple" ideas is the scholar's enemy. Only a deep examination of all facets of the subject matter can reveal the true depth. This approach is evidenced in his published works, Chidushei R' Reuvain.
2. The examination of all options: Rabbi Grozovsky held that the proper understanding of Talmud demands examining even those alternatives that one instinctively dismisses. One cannot dismiss any possibility outright without arguments. Rather all options must be subjected to full scrutiny.

== Opposition to Zionism ==
Grozovsky was a fierce opponent of Zionism and the State of Israel. He wrote several essays attacking the Zionist movement and describing how Haredim should deal with the State. These essays were later collected and published in the book Ba'ayos Hazman. In one essay, Grozovsky stressed that Agudath Israel differed from the extreme anti Zionist Neturei Karta only in tactics, not in ideology. He also participated in demonstrations against various actions of the Israeli government, and spoke against it in strong terms.

R. Reuven said that Jews love Eretz Yisroel is due to the holiness with which Hashem sanctified it - "but all of this is only when it comes from belief in Hashem and His Torah."

R. Reuven commented on the verse in Samuel "for all the nations are planted in their land and language, but we are planted in Hashem and his Torah."

== Sources ==
- Rabbi Reuvain Grozovsky: From Kamenitz to America
