= North Shore Hebrew Academy =

Location
- 16 Cherry Lane, 26 Old Mill Road, 400 North Service Road; Great Neck, Nassau County, New York; United States; 40°49′8″N 73°44′37″W

Information
- Type: Private
- Motto: Where dreams become accomplishments
- Religious affiliation: Modern Orthodox Jewish
- Established: 1954
- Founder: Rabbi Dr. Ephraim Wolf
- Head of school: Jeffrey B. Kobrin
- Grades: Pre-K–12
- Colors: Green and Gold
- Mascot: Brandon (Lion)
- Team name: Lions
- Accreditation: Middle States Association of Colleges and Schools
- Tuition: $38,000
- Website: www.nsha.org, www.nshahs.org

North Shore Hebrew Academy (NSHA or NSHAHS) is a Modern Orthodox yeshiva located in Great Neck, New York. The academy has four divisions: Early Childhood (grades T–K), Elementary School (grades 1–5), Middle School (grades 6–8), and High School (grades 9–12).

== Description ==
The founding principal of North Shore Hebrew Academy was Rabbi Dr. Ephraim Wolf.

For the youngest students, pre-kindergarten through fifth grades are located at 16 Cherry Lane in Great Neck, New York. The academy has a total population of about 400 students.

The academy's middle school (teaching grades 6–8) is located at 26 Old Mill Road in Great Neck; it shares a campus with the Great Neck Synagogue. This middle school has a total population of approximately 170 students.

For the oldest students, the academy's high school (teaching grades 9–12) is located at 400 North Service Road in Great Neck. The total population is approximately 400 students. This high school was founded in 2001; a new 187,000 square feet (17,400 m^{2}) facility was opened in 2006. The school has been accredited by the Middle States Association. In 2011, the school was involved in a cheating scandal, along with some other schools on Long Island; local youth were being paid to take SATs and ACTs on behalf of other students. In 2016, Niche listed North Shore Hebrew High School as one of the 100 best private schools in New York state.

In extracurricular activities, the academy's middle and high school athletic teams are called the Lions.

On the administrative side, Ivan Kaufman is the chairman of the academy's board, and Daniella Muller is the academy's president. Kaufman was the primary motivator for adding a high school to the academy; this high school opened in September 2001. From 2001 through 2022, Dr. Daniel J. Vitow was the high school's headmaster. This position was later assumed by Rabbi Dr. Jeffrey Kobrin, who had previously been the Rosh Yeshiva, as well as head of the academy's elementary and middle school divisions.

In a security incident, North Shore's website and email system were hacked on December 15, 2020; as a result, they displayed antisemitic content.

== See also ==
- Hebrew Academy of Nassau County
