= Beth midrash =

Jewish study hall located in Jewish places of worship or study

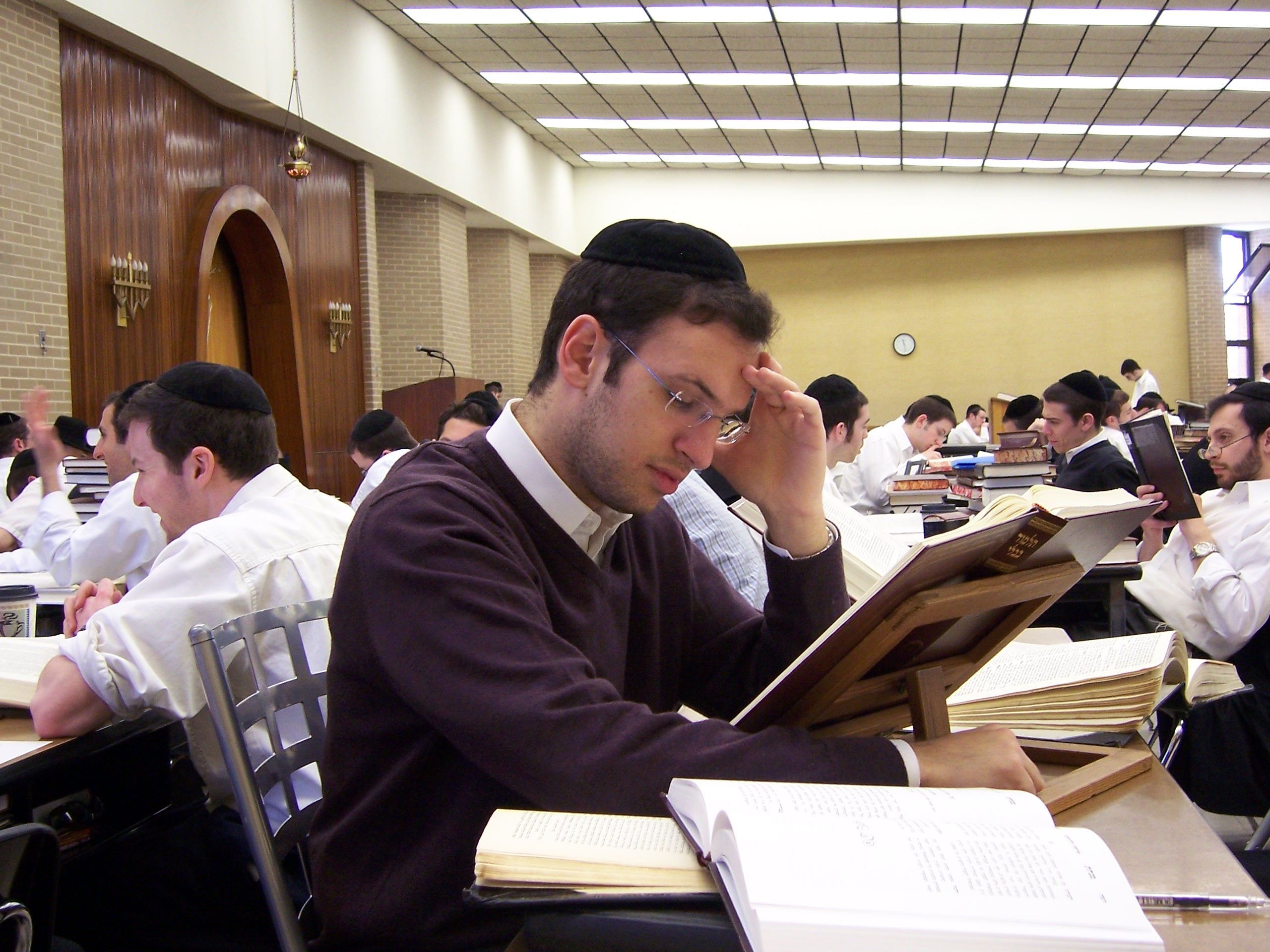
A typical beth midrash, Yeshivas Ner Yisroel, Baltimore

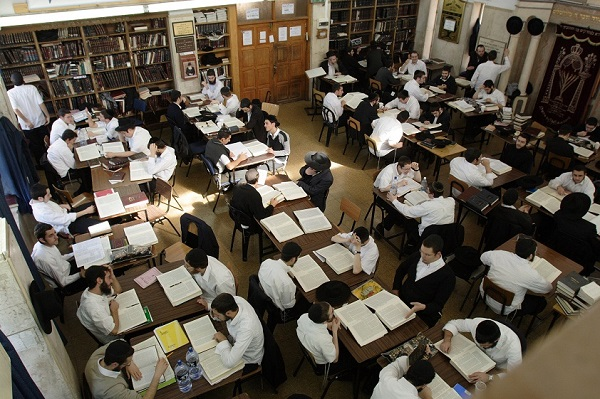
Zal, Toras Emes Yeshiva, Jerusalem

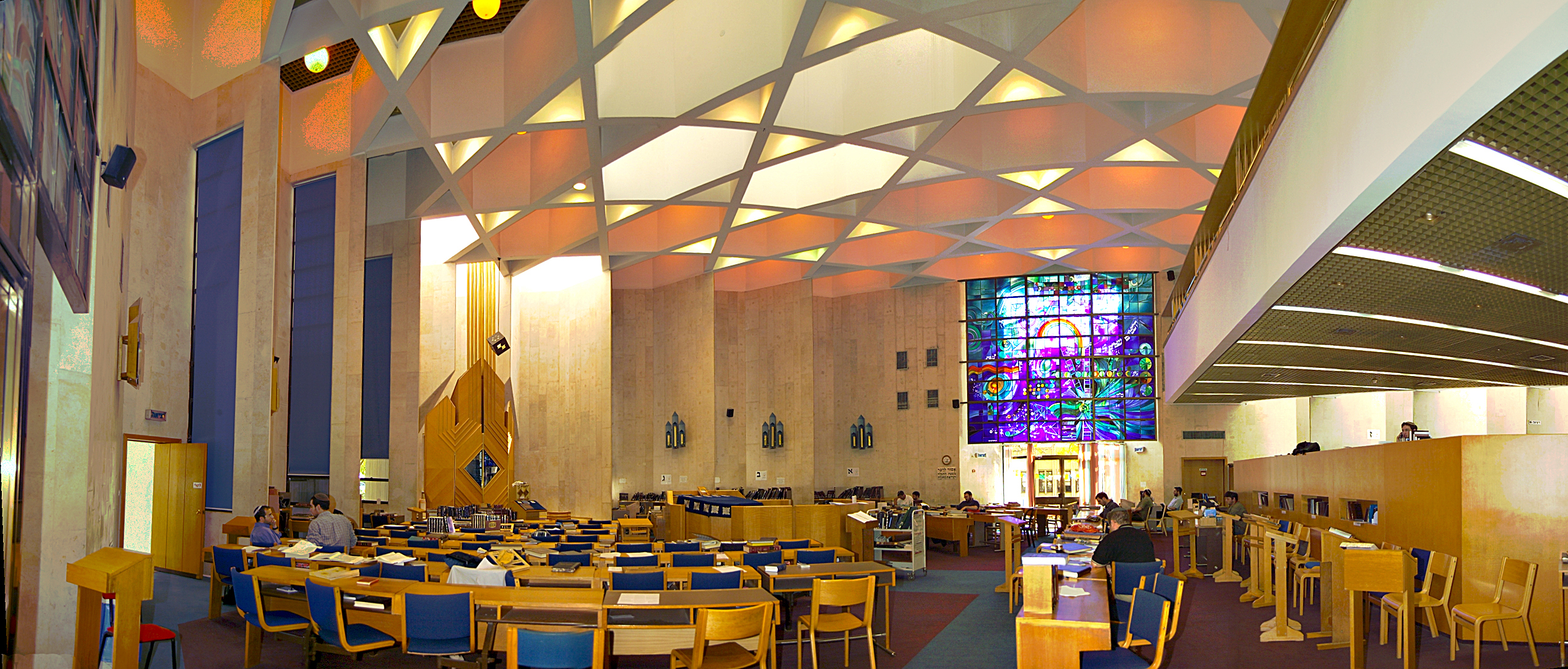
Beth Midrash – Machon HaGavoah LeTorah, Bar-Ilan University

A beit midrash (Hebrew: בֵּית מִדְרָשׁ, romanized: bêt midrāš, lit. 'house [of] study'; pl. בָּתֵּי מִדְרָשׁ, bātê midrāš), or beth midrash, (Note: Beis medrash or bais midrash in Ashkenazic Hebrew.) (Note: The various transcriptions and pronunciations take the same spelling in Modern Hebrew.) is a dedicated study hall, often located within or adjacent to a synagogue, but sometimes housed in its own building, where Jews engage in intensive Torah study, including of the Hebrew Bible, Mishnah, Gemara, Halakha, Midrash, and other Jewish classical texts. It is distinct from a beit knesset (בֵּית כְּנֶסֶת, bêt knésset, 'house [of] assembly')—a synagogue—though the two are often coextensive.

In Yiddish, the beth midrash may be referred to as a zal (Yiddish: זאַל, lit. 'hall'). Beit midrash can also refer to a yeshiva gedolah (יְשִׁיבָה גְּדוֹלָה, yĕšīvāh gĕdōlāh, 'great academy'), which is a post-secondary, undergraduate-level program commonly attended by Orthodox Jewish young men. The Arabic term madrasa (Arabic: مَدْرَسَة, lit. 'place [of] study') is derived from the same Semitic root and refers to any type of educational institution. The root ד־ר־שׁ (d-r-š) is then generalized to mean "to expound" or to "interpret".

== History ==
Early rabbinic literature, including the Mishnah, makes mention of the beth midrash as an institution distinct from the beth din and Sanhedrin. It was meant as a place of Torah study and interpretation, as well as the development of halakha (the practical application of the Jewish Law).

The origin of the beth midrash, or house of study, can be traced to the early rabbinic period, following the Siege of Jerusalem (70 CE) in which the destruction of the Temple took place. The earliest known rabbinical school was established by Rabbi Yochanan ben Zakkai at Yavne. Other official schools were soon established under different rabbis. These men traced their ideological roots back to the rabbis of the late Second Temple period, specifically the Houses of Hillel and Shammai, two schools of thought.

By late antiquity, the beth midrash had developed along with the synagogue into a distinct though somewhat related institution. The main difference between the beth midrash and beth ha-keneseth (synagogue) is that the beth ha-keneseth is sanctified for prayer only and that even the study of Torah would violate its sanctity while in the beth midrash both Torah study and prayer are allowed. For this reason most synagogues designate their sanctuary as a beth midrash so that in addition to prayer the study of the Torah would also be permitted.

== Structure ==
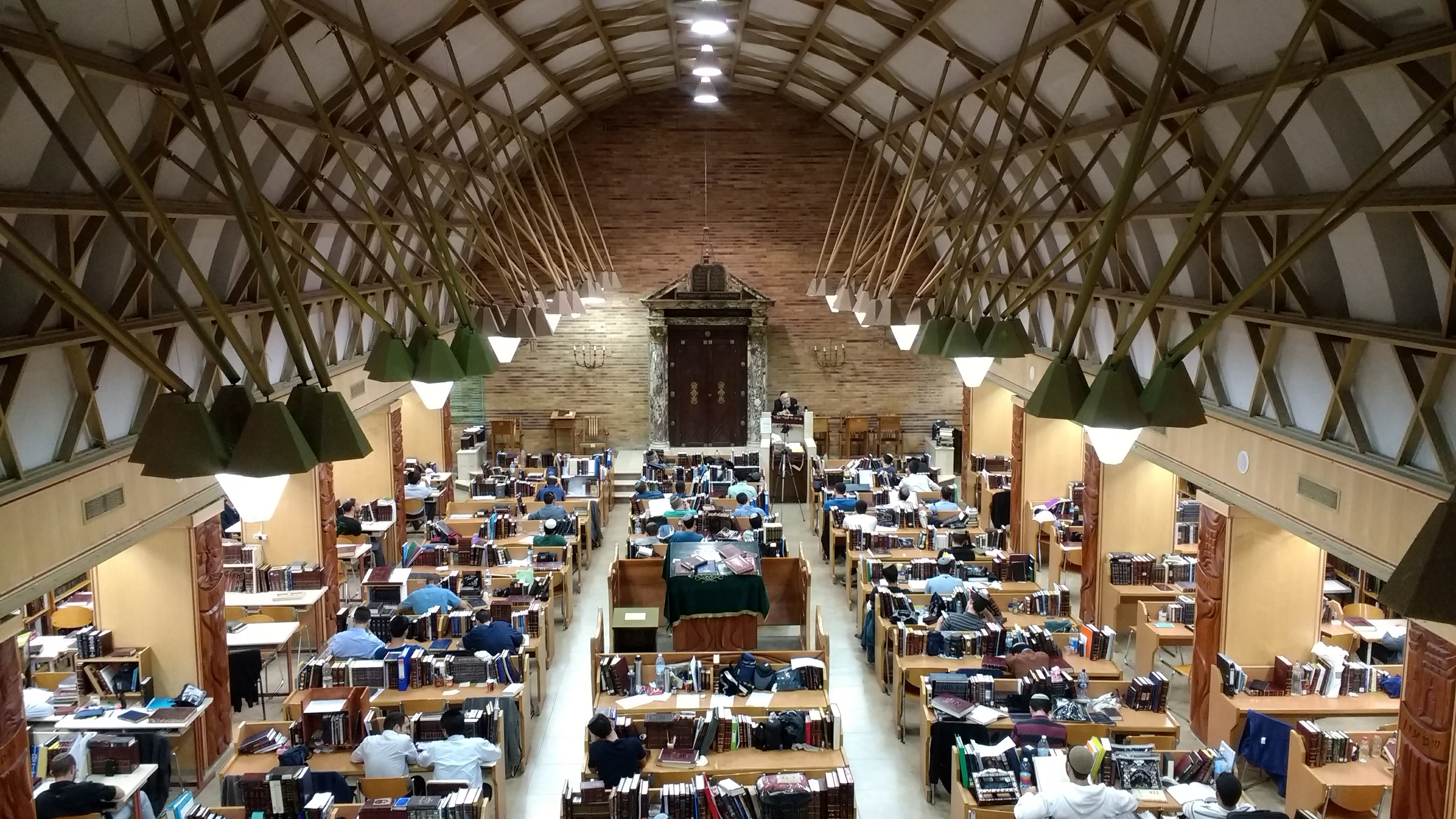
Beth Midrash of Yeshivat Kerem B'Yavneh.

There are generally either benches or chairs for sitting, along with tables on which books are placed. In Lithuanian yeshivas the beth midrash will have shtenders (standing desks resembling lecterns; the Yiddish word is derived from the German Ständer).

A characteristic beth midrash has many hundreds of books, including at least several copies of the entire Talmud, Torah, Tanach, siddurim (prayer books), Shulchan Aruch, Mishneh Torah, Arba'ah Turim, Mishnah Berurah, Aruch HaShulchan and other frequently consulted works.

In modern times, batei midrash are typically found as the central study halls of yeshivas or independent kollels, both institutions of Torah study. The location and institution of study are often interchanged, so in popular parlance, yeshivot are sometimes referred to as batei midrash. A beth midrash may also be housed in a synagogue, or vice versa. In antiquity, this is a matter of debate (see below). Many batei midrash originally serve the community but attract a yeshiva in the course of their existence.

== Virtual beth midrash ==
A virtual beth midrash is an online forum that provides articles for self-study and live, online classes, which sometimes makes use of "breakout groups" to provide for chavrusa-style learning typical of a traditional beth midrash study hall.

== See also ==
- Madrasa – School or college, often providing an Islamic education
- Mechina – Israeli educational institution
- Midrasha – Institute of post-secondary Jewish studies for women
