= Yeshiva gedolah =

Type of yeshiva

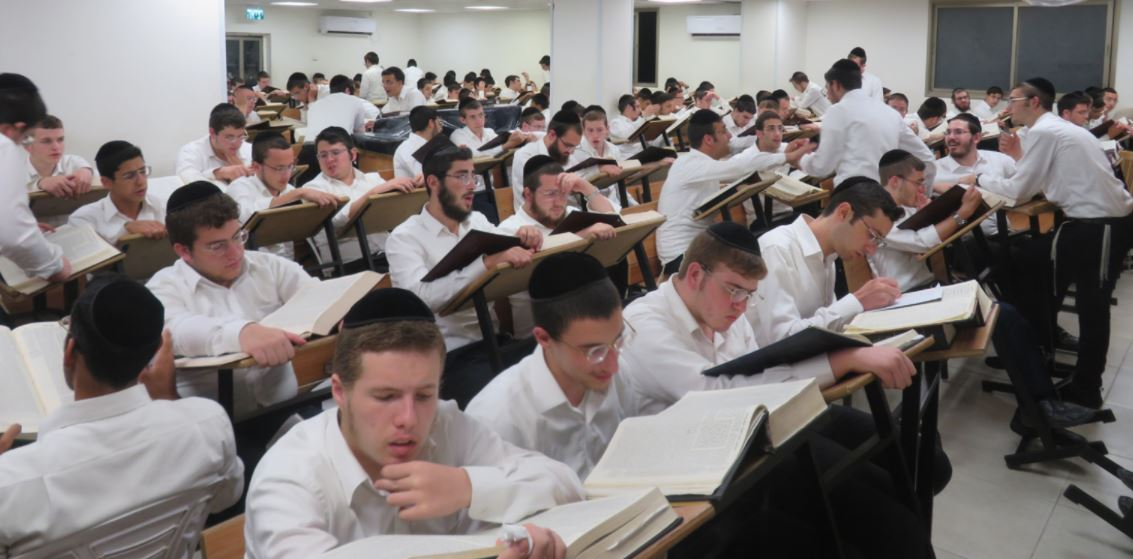
A yeshiva gedolah in Israel

Yeshiva gedolah (Hebrew: ישיבה גדולה), known in the United States as bais medrash, is a type of yeshiva, a Jewish educational institution, which is aimed at post-secondary students in their later teens or younger twenties. This contrasts with a Yeshiva Ketana or Mesivta, in which students are typically in the early teens.

== Israel and the United States ==
There are several differences between yeshiva gedolahs in Israel and the United States, the most obvious one being its name: in the United States, yeshiva gedolahs are referred to as bais medrash, the same name given to Torah study halls. Another difference is that while in most yeshivas in the United States, students graduate from mesivta after twelfth grade and then go on to yeshiva gedolah, Israeli mesivtas (known in Israel as yeshiva ketana or yeshiva tichonit) go until eleventh grade, after which the students graduate to yeshiva gedolah.

== Structure ==
=== Seder ===
The day in yeshiva gedolahs (as well as in many mesivtas) is split into three parts, each one known as a seder (Hebrew: סדר, plural: sedarim). "First seder" or "morning seder" generally consists of in-depth Talmud study, known as iyun (Hebrew: עיון). This is done both in chavrusa fashion where students pair up to learn, and in a shiur where a rabbi expounds on the Talmud and its commentaries. "Second seder" or "afternoon seder" is usually dedicated to learning Talmud b'kius (Hebrew: בקיאות) - covering ground without delving into the commentaries. The learning at "Night seder", conducted after dinner and continuing into the night, differs between yeshivas, sometimes with the students continuing their studies from first seder and sometimes learning a different gemara than they do the rest of the day. Also incorporated into the day's schedule is a Halakha seder (often learning the Mishnah Berurah) and Musar seder, dedicated to learning musar (notably, the Brisk yeshivas in Jerusalem don't have official musar sedarim).

=== Mishmer ===
Thursday nights in yeshiva gedolahs often include Mishmer (or Seder Leil Shishi) where the students stay up the whole or most of the night learning. They also eat Shabbat food that night, including cholent.

=== Tracks ===
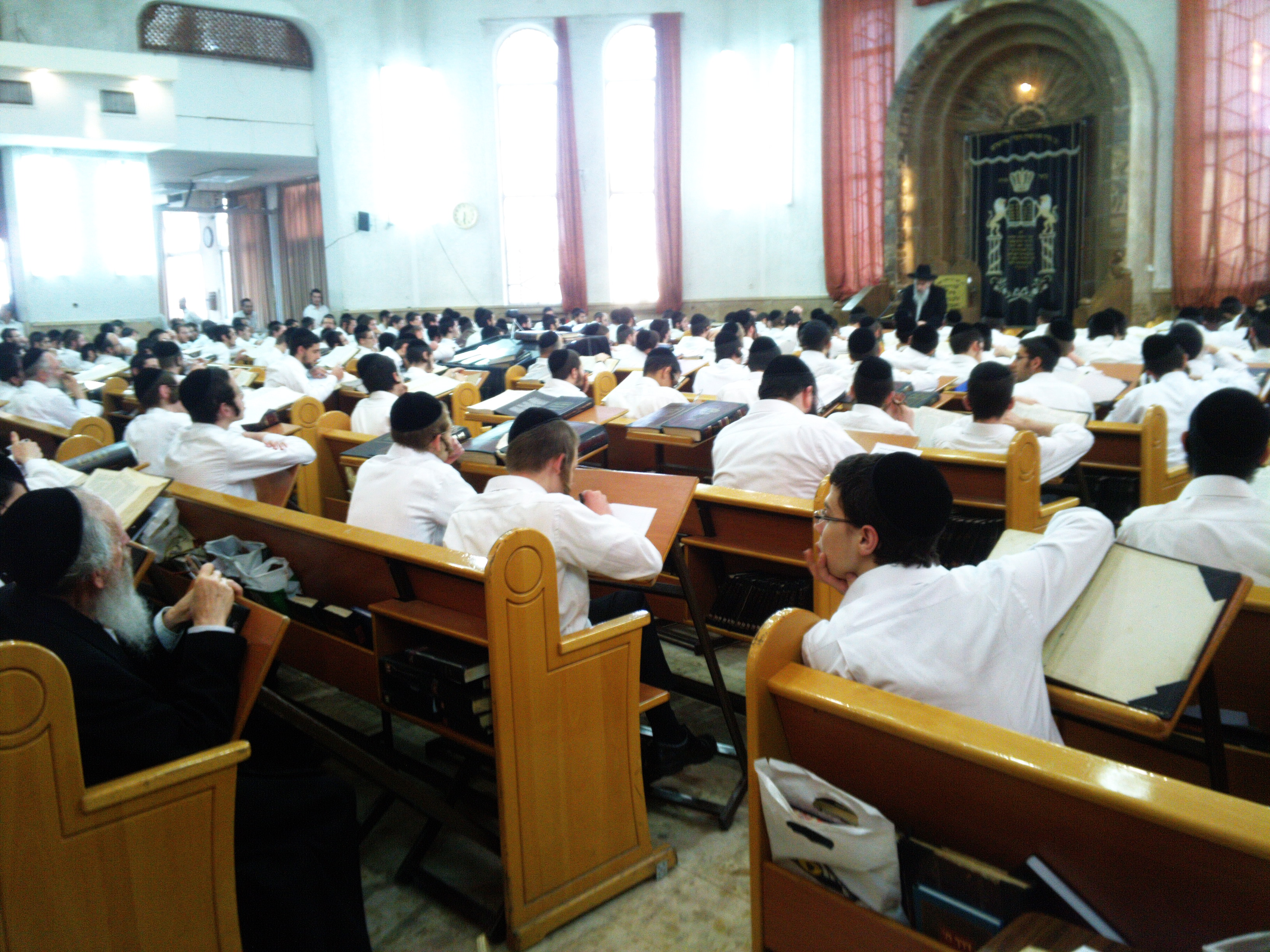
Shiur klali at the Slabodka Yeshiva in Bnei Brak, Israel

In larger yeshivas, the students are divided in tracks by age. The grades are known by the amount of years its students were in the yeshiva. For example, the youngest track which had just completed twelfth grade (and in Israel, eleventh grade) is called "first year," the grade above them is called "second year," and so on. Historically, the oldest grade was known as a "kibutz", and some yeshivas in Israel retain this tradition, calling their older grades kibutzs.

=== Shiur klali ===
Yeshiva gedolahs often include a shiur klali (Hebrew: שיעור כללי), meaning "comprehensive shiur", given by the rosh yeshiva to the entire yeshiva.

== See also ==
- Jewish day school
- Mesivta
- Yeshiva
