= Shraga Feivel Mendlowitz =

American Rabbi

- Born: 1886; Világ, Austria-Hungary
- Died: 7 September 1948 (aged 61–62)

Shraga Feivel Mendlowitz (1886 – 7 September 1948) was a leader of American Orthodox Judaism and founder of institutions including Torah U'Mesorah, an outreach and educational organization. In 1921 he became principal of Yeshiva Torah Vodaath, an early Brooklyn-based yeshiva founded in 1918. He subsequently added a high school and postgraduate program to the yeshiva. His policies were often informed by the Orthodox philosophical movement Torah im Derech Eretz.

== Biography ==
Mendlowitz was born in Világ (today Svetlice, Slovakia), in the Austria-Hungarian Empire, a small town near the border of Poland, to a Hasidic family: Moshe and Bas-Sheva Mendlowitz. Shraga Feivel pronounced his family name Mendelovich.

His mother died when he was ten. He was twelve when the family relocated to Mezőlaborc (now Slovak: Medzilaborce), where he studied "with Reb Aaron, dayyan of Mezo-Laboretz, who considered him his top pupil." Having received semicha at age 17, he continued his studies under Rabbi Simcha Bunim Schreiber (the Shevet Sofer, grandson of the Chatam Sofer). Throughout his life, however, he refused to use the title of Rabbi and insisted on being referred to as "Mr. Mendlowitz."

At age 22, he "married his step-mother's younger sister, Bluma Rachel" in the town of Humenné, Slovakia, and began to study several not well known Jewish writings, including the works of Rabbi Samson Raphael Hirsch. This briefly led to controversy until he could prove the relevance of Hirsch's work in defending the Orthodox viewpoint against attempts at reforming Jewish practice.

== Activities ==
Mendlowitz actively sought positions in Germany and the United States, with the intention of disseminating knowledge of Judaism to Jews previously unexposed to their heritage, and in September 1913, he arrived alone in Philadelphia. He lived in Scranton, Pennsylvania, for seven years, teaching in the local Talmud Torah (afternoon program in Jewish studies). In 1920 he was able to bring his family from Hungary, and settled in Williamsburg, Brooklyn.

Mendlowitz joined forces with Chazan Yossele Rosenblatt in 1923, to produce Dos Yiddishe Licht, a short-lived English and Yiddish language weekly that included articles of comment and inspiration. It eventually became a daily but was forced to discontinue publication in 1927, because of financial difficulties. In fact, Rosenblatt went on a year-long concert tour to pay back the monies owed to creditors.

The founding members of Yeshiva Torah Vodaath soon offered him the principalship of the institution. Originally starting off as an elementary school, Mendlowitz soon added the second Yeshiva high school in America. (The first being the Talmudical Academy, associated with Yeshiva College, founded in 1916.) The yeshiva opened its mesivta in 1926 and then under Mendlowitz's direction, another early development in America (but also in competition with Yeshiva College), a post-graduate program. Mendlowitz first appointed Rabbi Gedalia Schorr to the faculty of the Yeshiva, later to become its principal and Rosh Yeshiva.

Despite his devotion to Torah Vodaath he assisted in the founding (both personally and financially) of several similar institutions, such as Mesivta Chaim Berlin (to which he relinquished a number of his top pupils), Telshe Cleveland and Beis Medrash Gevoha. All grew to occupy important places in 20th century American Orthodoxy.

His work in Jewish education extended to several other organisations he founded. Aish Dos was a specialized institution that focused on teaching outreach skills, Torah U'mesora was a nationwide umbrella organization for Jewish day schools, and Beis Medrash Elyon was one of America's first post-graduate yeshivas (which also included a kollel). In 1931 he founded Camp Mesivta, the first yeshiva day camp.

Mendlowitz renounced eating meat after the Holocaust, saying: "There has been enough killing in the world."
