= Wagmag =

Coordinates: 40.7164°N 73.9570°W

wagmag
- wagmag masthead
- Categories: Fine arts
- Frequency: Monthly
- Publisher: ARTFront, Inc
- Founded: 2003
- Company: Voluntary
- Country: United States
- Based in: Brooklyn
- Language: English
- Website: www.wagmag.org

Wagmag, a Brooklyn Art Guide, is a free monthly listings magazine with information about Brooklyn's numerous contemporary art galleries, including opening receptions and exhibitions. The magazine serves the communities of: Bedford–Stuyvesant, Boerum Hill, Brooklyn Heights, Bushwick, Carroll Gardens, Clinton Hill, Cobble Hill, Dumbo, Fort Greene, Gowanus, Greenpoint, Park Slope, Prospect Heights, Red Hook and Williamsburg.

Wagmag is printed and online, listing gallery venues with a 16-page pamphlet publication that lists each month's art, the reviews, how to get about, and a special section for openings and events.

Wagmag is produced by "ARTfront, Inc." a not-for-profit organization and so can be taken for free. The expanded guide also includes critics' suggestions of exhibits to see as well as a website that has exhibition details.
