= Williamsburg, Brooklyn =

Neighborhood in New York City

Williamsburg
- Neighborhood
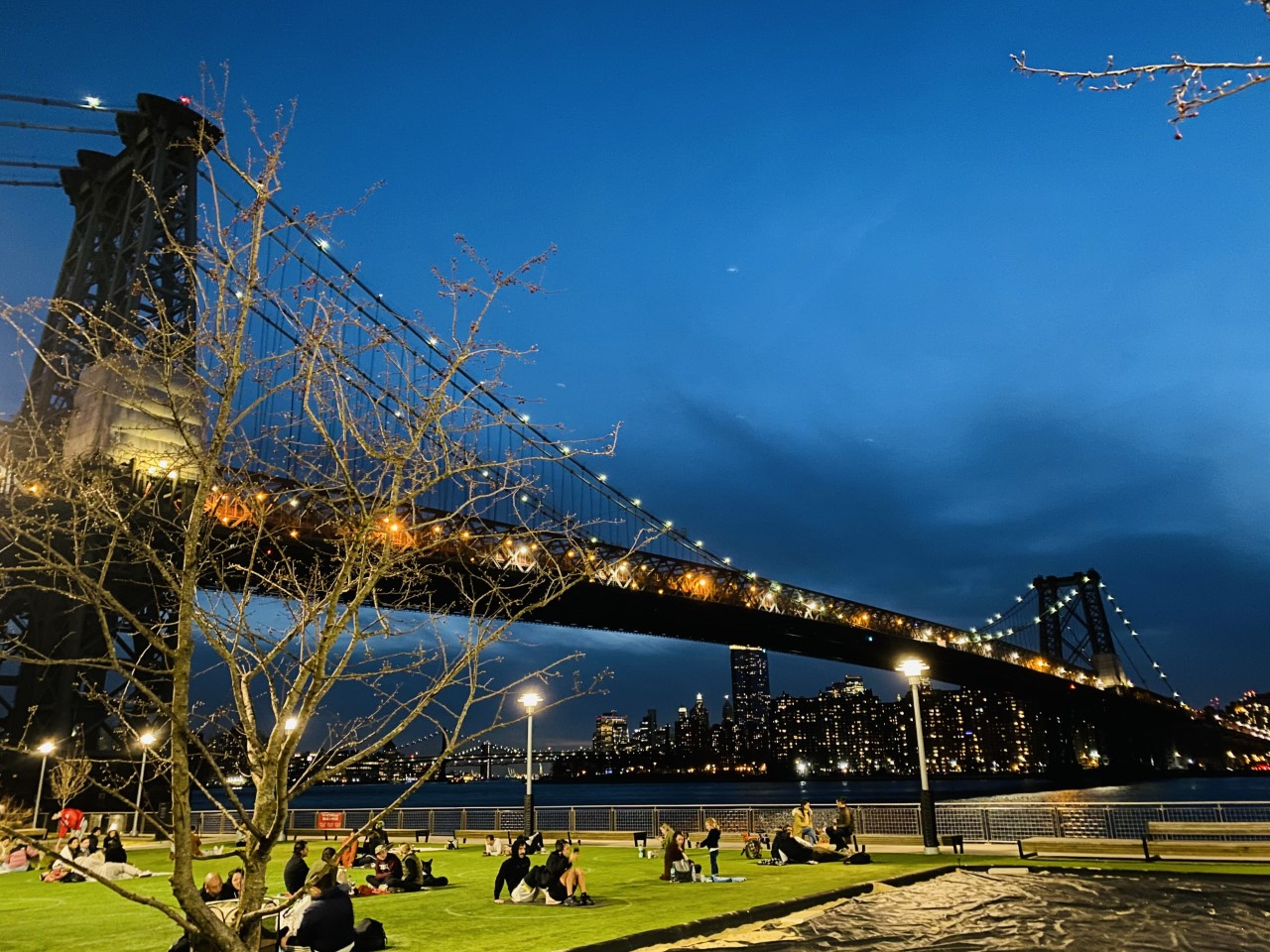
- Williamsburg Bridge and Domino Park
- Nicknames: The WillieB, The Burg, Billyburg
- Location in New York City
- Coordinates: 40.71°N 73.96°W
- Country: United States
- State: New York
- City: New York
- Borough: Brooklyn
- Community District: Brooklyn 1 Brooklyn 3
- Named for: Jonathan Williams

Area
  - Total: 2.179 sq mi (5.64 km^{2})

Population (2010)
  - Total: 151,308
  - Density: 69,440/sq mi (26,810/km^{2})

Race/Ethnicity
  - White: 66.5%
  - Hispanic: 26.3%
  - Asian: 2.9%
  - Black: 2.8%
  - Other: 2.4%

Economics
  - Median income: $98,284
- ZIP Codes: 11206, 11211, 11249
- Area code: 718, 347, 929, and 917

Williamsburg is a neighborhood in the New York City borough of Brooklyn, bordered by Greenpoint to the north; Bedford–Stuyvesant to the south; Bushwick and East Williamsburg to the east; and the East River to the west. The southern portion of Williamsburg is commonly referred to as South Williamsburg, a term used for the area along the East River south of Division Avenue. It was an independent city until 1855, when it was annexed by Brooklyn; at that time, the spelling was changed from Williamsburgh (with an "h") to Williamsburg.

Williamsburg, especially near the waterfront, was a vital industrial district until the mid-20th century. As many of the jobs were outsourced beginning in the 1970s, the area endured a period of economic contraction which did not begin to turn around until activist groups began to address housing, infrastructure, and youth education issues in the late 20th century. An ecosocial arts movement emerged alongside the activists in the late 1980s, often referred to as the Brooklyn Immersionists. The community-based scene cultivated a web of activity in the streets, rooftops and large warehouses, and attracted both the national and international press. Small, locally owned businesses began to return to the neighborhood during this expansion of creative urbanism in the 1990s.

In the 21st century, the city provided zoning changes and tax abatements to corporate developers which shifted the area from a creative, slow growth revival to an economy that was dominated by high rises and chain stores. Despite the rise in the cost of living that followed, and the loss of the original creative community that had rejuvenated the district, a new contemporary art scene and vibrant nightlife emerged that catered to new residents. The intensity and innovations of the Immersionist era in Williamsburg has continued to project the district's image internationally as a "Little Berlin". During the early 2000s, the neighborhood became a center for indie rock and electroclash. Numerous ethnic groups still inhabit enclaves within the neighborhood, including Italians, Jews, Hispanics, Poles, Puerto Ricans, and Dominicans.

Williamsburg is part of Brooklyn Community District 1, and its primary ZIP Codes are 11206, 11211 and 11249. It is patrolled by the 90th and 94th Precincts of the New York City Police Department. Politically, it is represented by the New York City Council's 33rd District, which represents the western and southern parts of the neighborhood, and the 34th District, which represents the eastern part. As of the 2020 United States census, the neighborhood's population is 151,308.

== History ==
=== Founding ===
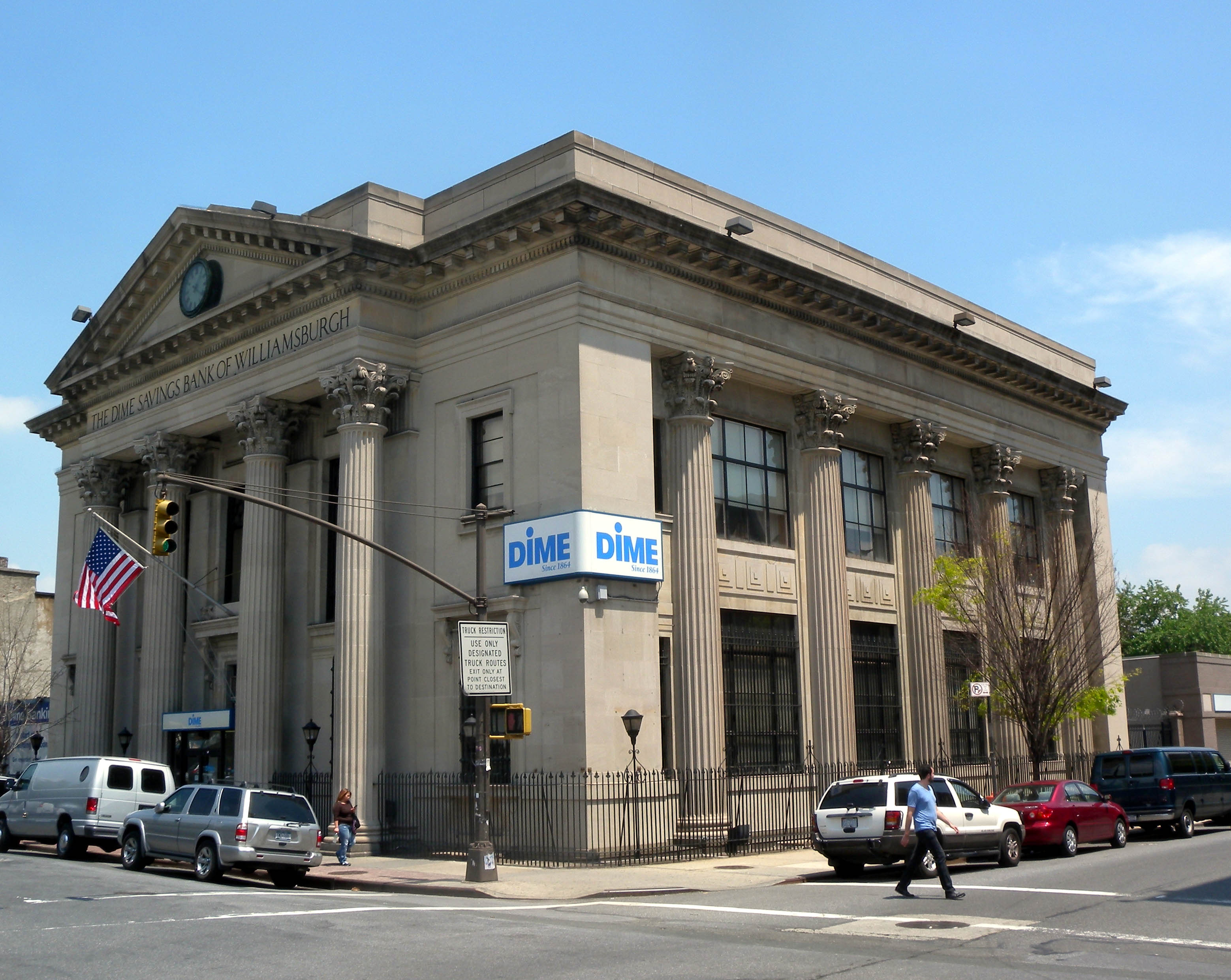
The Dime Savings Bank of Williamsburgh

In 1638, the Dutch West India Company purchased the area's land from the Lenape Native Americans who occupied the area. In 1661, the company chartered the Town of Boswijck, including land that would later become Williamsburg. After the English takeover of New Netherland in 1664, the town's name was anglicized to Bushwick. During colonial times, villagers called the area "Bushwick Shore", a name that lasted for about 140 years. Bushwick Shore was cut off from the other villages in Bushwick by Bushwick Creek to the north and by Cripplebush, a region of thick, boggy shrub land that extended from Wallabout Creek in the south to Newtown Creek in the east. Bushwick residents called Bushwick Shore "the Strand".

Farmers and gardeners from the other Bushwick villages sent their goods to Bushwick Shore to be ferried across the East River to Manhattan for sale via a market at present day Grand Street. Bushwick Shore's favorable location close to New York City led to the creation of several farming developments. In 1802, real estate speculator Richard M. Woodhull acquired 13 acres (5.3 hectares) near what would become Metropolitan Avenue, then North 2nd Street. He had Colonel Jonathan Williams, a U.S. Engineer, survey the property, and named it Williamsburgh (with an h at the end) in his honor. Originally a 13-acre (5.3 ha) development within Bushwick Shore, Williamsburg rapidly expanded during the first half of the 19th century and eventually seceded from Bushwick and formed its own independent city. Abraham J. Berry was the first mayor of the independent city of Williamsburgh; the "h" at the end of the name was dropped in 1855.

=== Incorporation of Williamsburgh ===
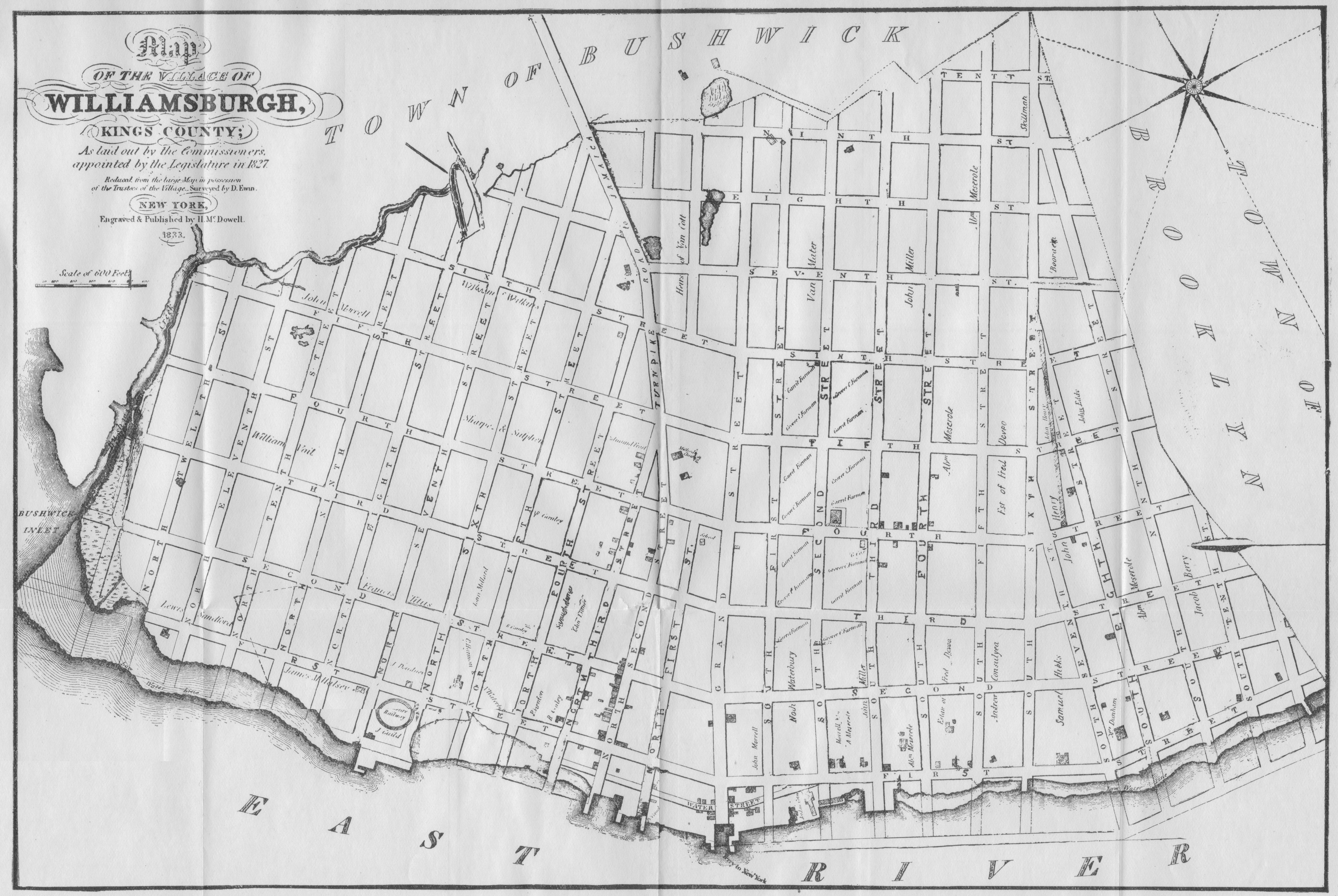
Map of the Village of Williamsburgh (1827)

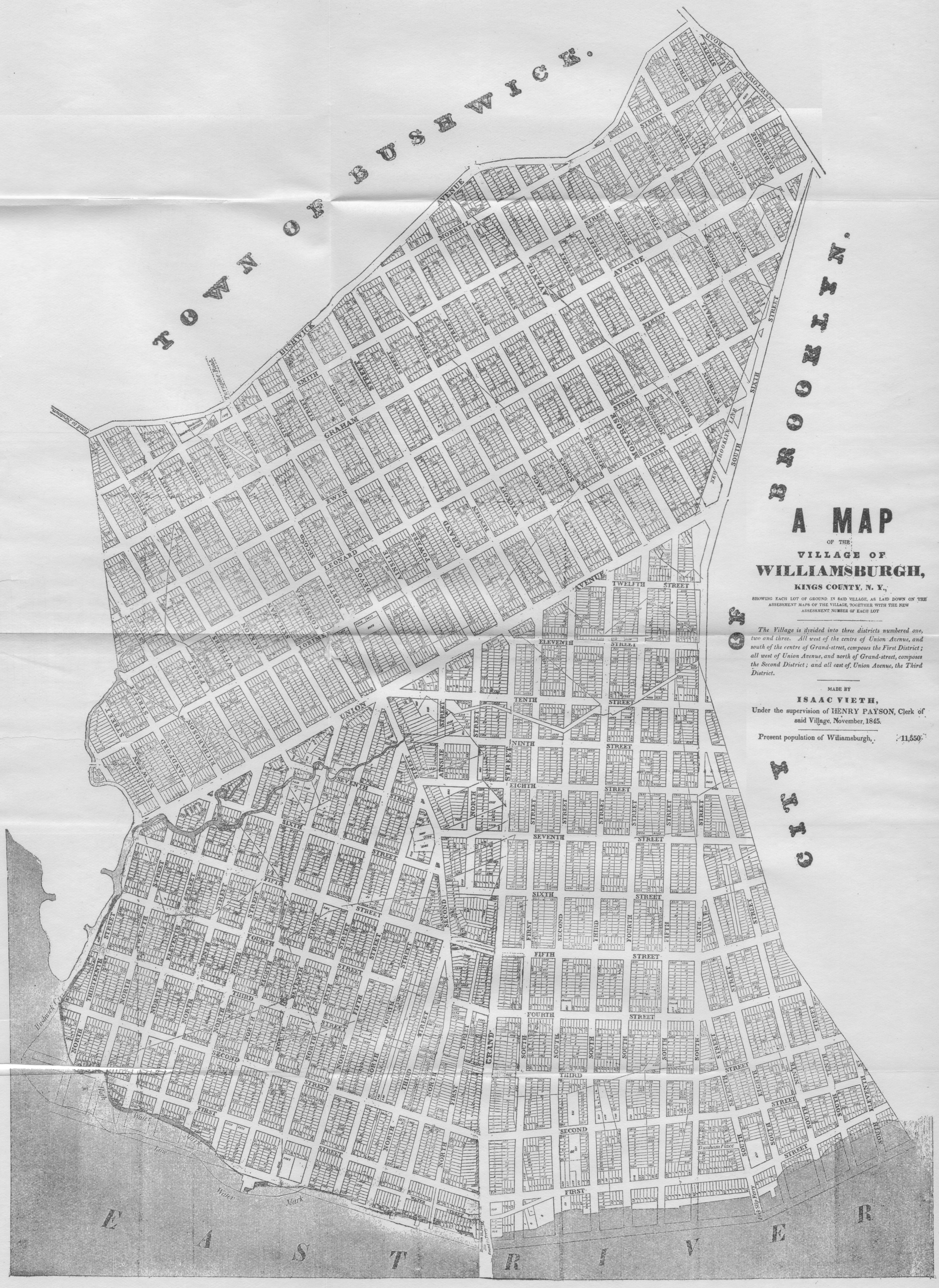
Map of the Town of Williamsburgh (1845)

Williamsburg was incorporated as the Village of Williamsburgh within the Town of Bushwick on April 14, 1827. In two years, it had a fire company, a post office, and a population of over 1,000. The deep drafts along the East River encouraged industrialists, many from Germany, to build shipyards around Williamsburg. Raw material was shipped in, and finished products were sent out of factories straight to the docks. Several sugar barons built processing refineries, all of which are now gone, except the refinery of the now-defunct Domino Sugar (formerly Havemeyer & Elder). Other important industries included shipbuilding and brewing.

On April 18, 1835, the Village of Williamsburg annexed a portion of the Town of Bushwick. The Village then consisted of three districts. The first district was commonly called the "South Side", the second district was called the "North Side", and the third district was called the "New Village". The names "North Side" and "South Side" remain in common usage today, but the name for the Third District has changed often. The New Village became populated by Germans, and for a time was known by the sobriquet of "Dutchtown".

In 1845, the population of Williamsburgh was 11,500.

On April 7, 1840. reflecting its increasing urbanization, Williamsburg separated from Bushwick as the Town of Williamsburg. Edmund Smith Driggs (1809–1889) was a Williamsburg resident and was elected the first president of the Village of Williamsburg in 1850. He was also president of the Williamsburg City Fire Insurance Company and built a row of houses on South Second Street. Driggs Avenue is named after him.

In 1851, the municipality became the City of Williamsburgh (it would discard the "h" in 1855), which was organized into three wards. The old First Ward roughly coincides with the South Side, and the Second Ward with the North Side, with the modern boundary at Grand Street. The Third Ward was to the east of these, stretching from Union Avenue east to Bushwick Avenue, beyond which is Bushwick (some of which is now called East Williamsburg).

=== Incorporation into the Eastern District ===
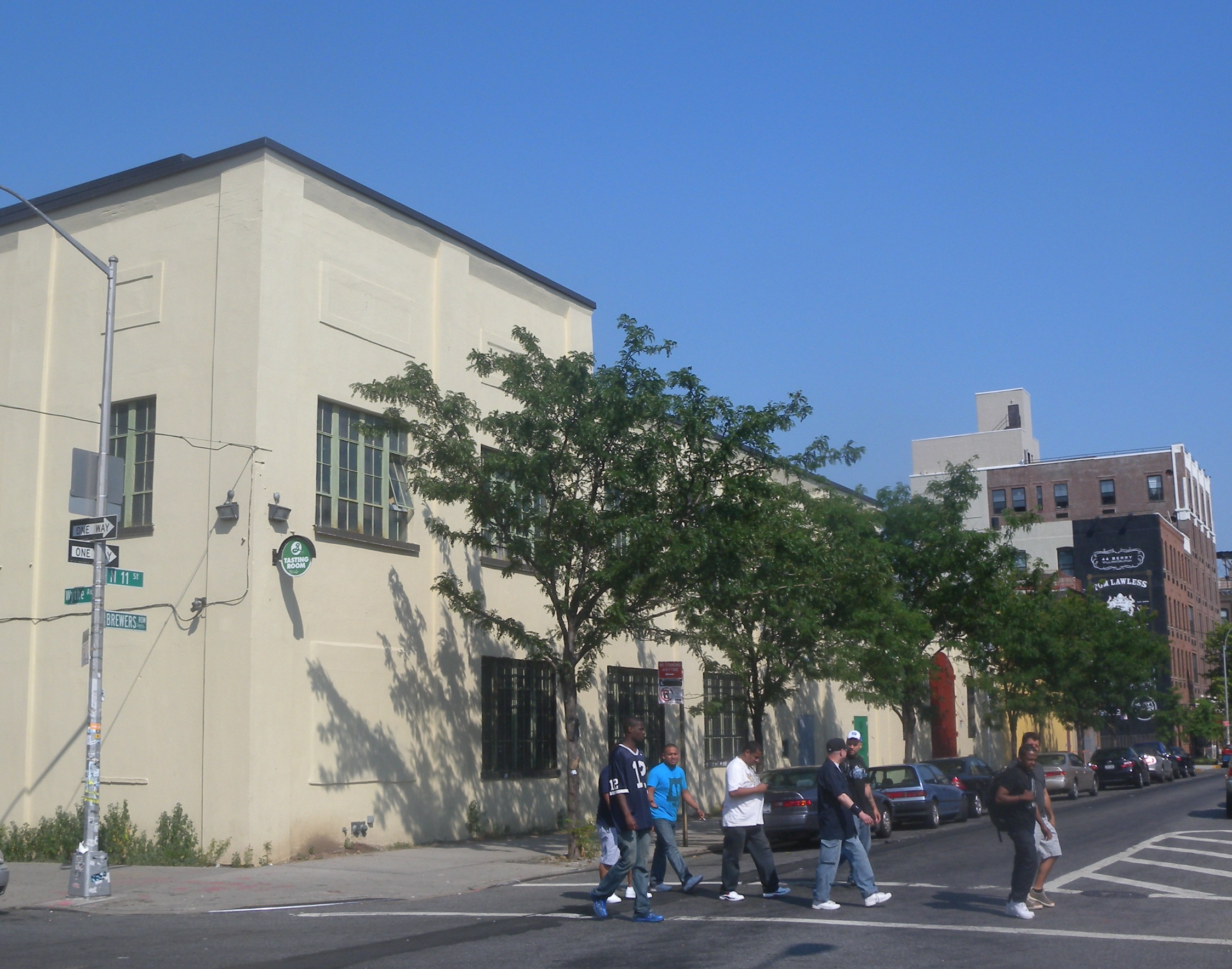
Brewers Row, North 11th Street

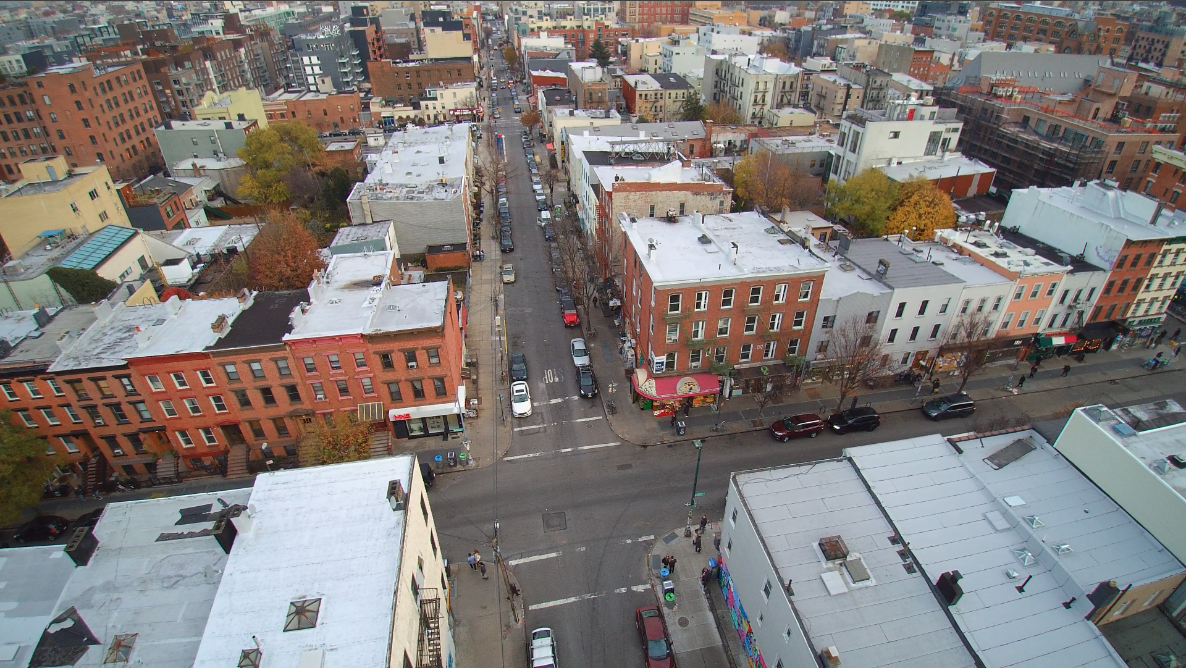
Bedford Avenue and North 8th Street

In 1855, the City of Williamsburg, along with the adjoining Town of Bushwick, was annexed into the City of Brooklyn as the so-called Eastern District. The First Ward of Williamsburg became Brooklyn's 13th Ward, the Second Ward Brooklyn's 14th Ward, and the Third Ward Brooklyn's 15th and 16th Wards.

During its period as part of Brooklyn's Eastern District, the area achieved remarkable industrial, cultural, and economic growth, and local businesses thrived. Wealthy New Yorkers such as Cornelius Vanderbilt and railroad magnate Jubilee Jim Fisk built shore-side mansions. Charles Pratt and his family founded the Pratt Institute, the great school of art & architecture, and the Astral Oil Works, which later became part of Standard Oil. Corning Glass Works was founded here, before moving upstate to Corning, New York. German immigrant, chemist Charles Pfizer founded Pfizer Pharmaceutical in Williamsburg, and the company maintained an industrial plant in the neighborhood through 2007, although its headquarters were moved to Manhattan in the 1960s.

Brooklyn's Broadway, ending in the ferry to Manhattan, became the area's lifeline. The area proved popular for condiment and household product manufacturers. Factories for Domino Sugar, Esquire Shoe Polish, Dutch Mustard, and many others were established in the late 19th and early 20th centuries. Many of these factory buildings are now being (or already have been) converted to non-industrial uses, primarily residential.

The population was at first heavily German, but many Jews from the Lower East side of Manhattan came to the area after the completion of the Williamsburg Bridge in 1903. Williamsburg had two major community banks: the Williamsburgh Savings Bank at 175 Broadway (chartered 1851, since absorbed by HSBC); and its rival, the Dime Savings Bank of Williamsburgh one block west (chartered 1864, now known as the DIME, has remained independent). The area around the Peter Luger Steak House, established in 1887, in the predominantly German neighborhood under the Williamsburg Bridge, was a major banking hub, until the City of Brooklyn united with the City of Greater New York. One of the early high schools in Brooklyn, the Eastern District High School, opened here in February 1900.

=== Incorporation into New York City ===
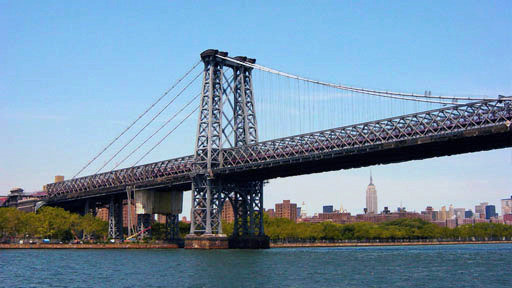
The Williamsburg Bridge connects the area with Manhattan's Lower East Side.

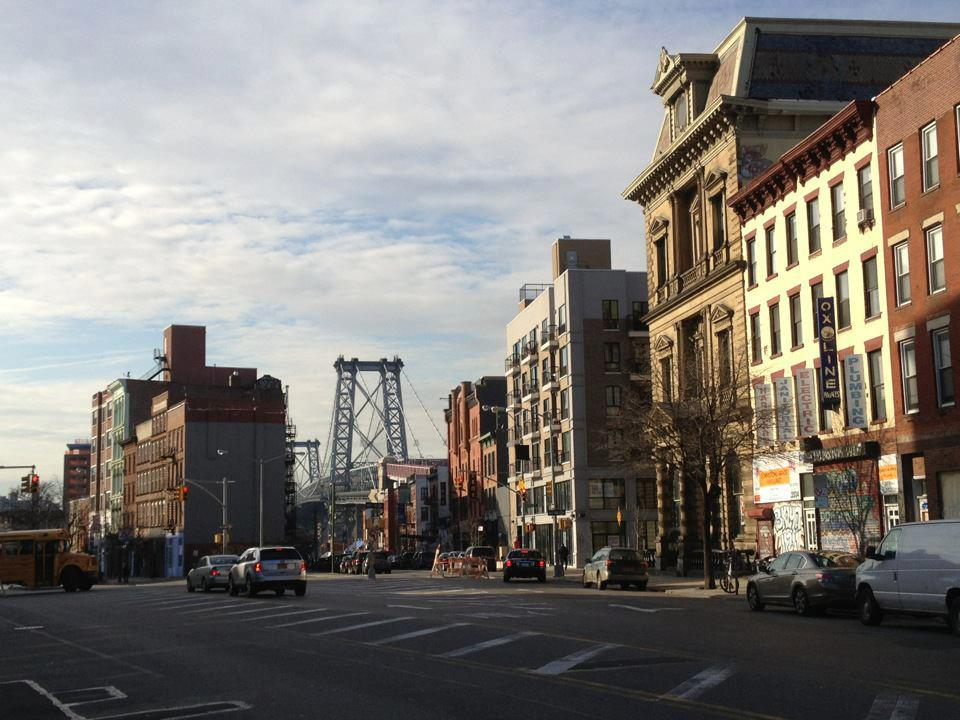
South Williamsburg streetscape

In 1898, Brooklyn became one of five boroughs within the City of Greater New York, and the Williamsburg neighborhood was opened to closer connections with the rest of the newly consolidated city. Five years later, the opening of the Williamsburg Bridge in 1903 further opened up the community to thousands of upwardly mobile immigrants and second-generation Americans fleeing the over-crowded slum tenements of Manhattan's Lower East Side. Williamsburg itself soon became the most densely populated neighborhood in New York City, which, in turn, was the most densely populated city in the United States. The novel A Tree Grows in Brooklyn addresses a young girl growing up in the tenements of Williamsburg during this era.

Brooklyn Union Gas in the early 20th century consolidated its coal gas production to Williamsburg at 370 Vandervoort Avenue, closing the Gowanus Canal gasworks. The 1970s energy crisis led the company to build a syngas factory. Late in the century, facilities were built to import liquefied natural gas from overseas. The intersection of Broadway, Flushing Avenue, and Graham Avenue was a cross-roads for many "inter-urbans", prior to World War I. These light rail trolleys ran from Long Island to Williamsburg.

Refugees from war-torn Europe began to stream into Brooklyn during and after World War II, including the Hasidim, whose populations had been devastated in the Holocaust. The area south of Division Avenue became home to a large population of adherents to the Satmar Hasidic sect, who came to the area from Hungary and Romania. Hispanics from Puerto Rico and the Dominican Republic also began to settle in the area. But the population explosion was eventually confronted with a decline of heavy industry, and from the 1960s, Williamsburg saw a marked increase in unemployment, crime, gang activity, and illegal drug use. Those who were able to move out often did, and the area became chiefly known for its crime and other social ills.

On February 3, 1971, at 10:42 pm, police officer Frank Serpico was shot during a drug bust, during a stakeout at 778 Driggs Avenue. Serpico had been one of the driving forces in the creation of the Knapp Commission, which exposed widespread police corruption. His fellow officers failed to call for assistance, and he was rushed to Greenpoint Hospital only when an elderly neighbor called the police. The incident was later dramatized in the opening scene of the 1973 film Serpico, starring Al Pacino in the title role.

=== Rezoning and corporate expansion ===
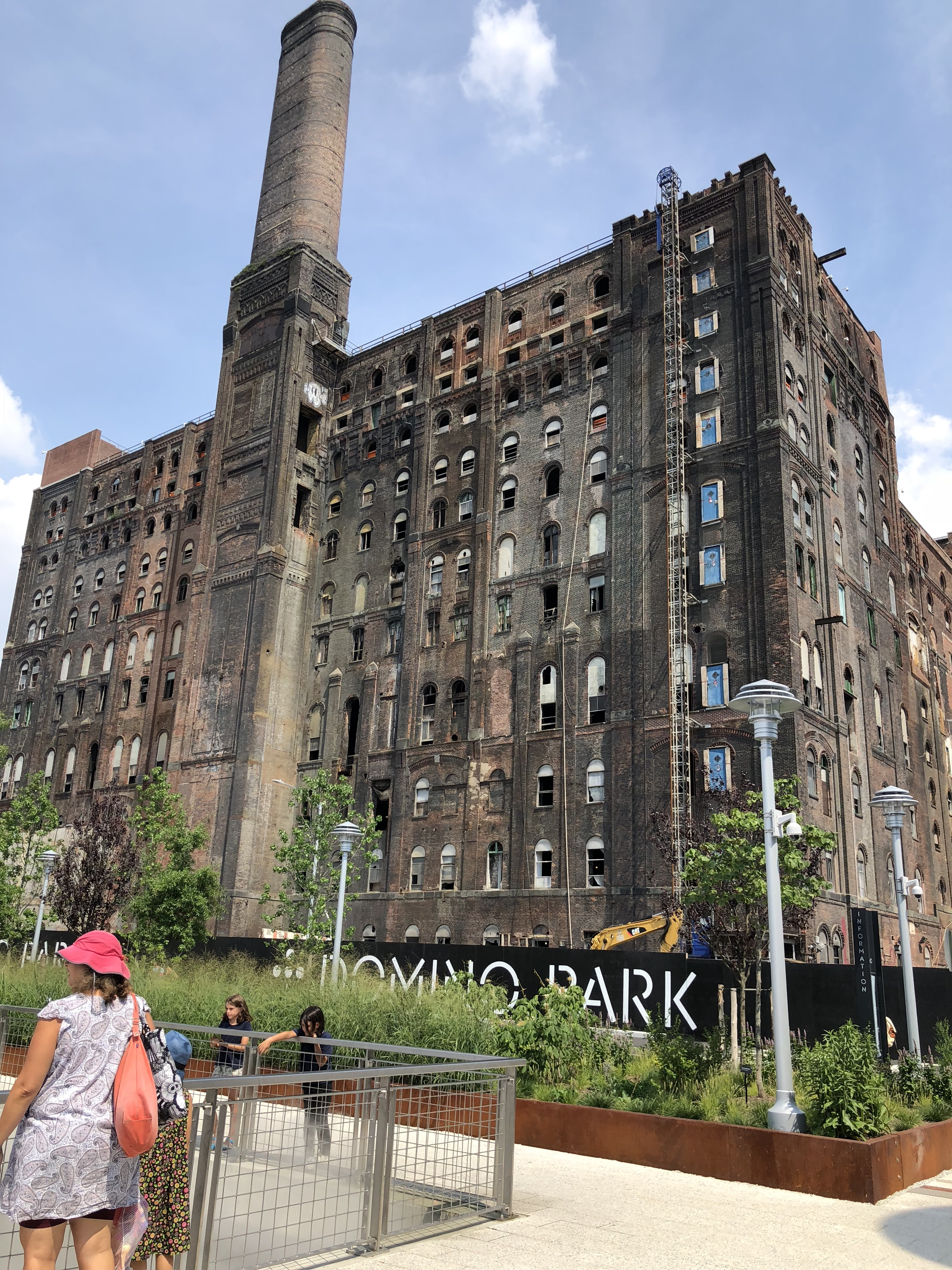
The site of the former Domino Sugar Refinery has undergone redevelopment for residential and commercial use in the 2010s and 2020s.

The price of land in Williamsburg has increased significantly since the 2000s. The North Side, above Grand Street, which separates the North Side from the South Side, is somewhat more expensive due to its proximity to the New York City Subway (specifically, the L train and G train on the BMT Canarsie Line and IND Crosstown Line, respectively). Increased gentrification has entered the South Side along the route of the J/Z and M trains (of which the latter route was modified to go from the downtown BMT Nassau Street Line to the midtown IND Sixth Avenue Line in 2010). This has prompted increases in rents south of Grand Street as well. Higher rents have driven out many bohemians, activists and creative urbanists to other neighborhoods farther afield such as Bushwick, Bedford-Stuyvesant, Fort Greene, Clinton Hill, Cobble Hill, and Red Hook.

On May 11, 2005, the New York City Council passed a large-scale rezoning of the North Side and Greenpoint waterfront. Billions of dollars in tax abatements were also provided to developers. Much of the waterfront district was rezoned to accommodate mixed-use high density residential buildings with a set-aside (but no earmarked funding) for public waterfront park space, with strict building guidelines calling for developers to create a continuous 2-mile (3.2 km) string of waterfront esplanades. Although a slow growth economic revival was already underway and was bringing back family owned local businesses, local elected officials touted the rezoning as an economically beneficial way to address the decline of manufacturing along the North Brooklyn waterfront. The storefronts and vacant warehouses in Williamsburg were already being adapted into creative clubs like The Green Room, El Sensorium, Fake Shop, Mustard, The AlulA Dimension and Galapagos Art Space.

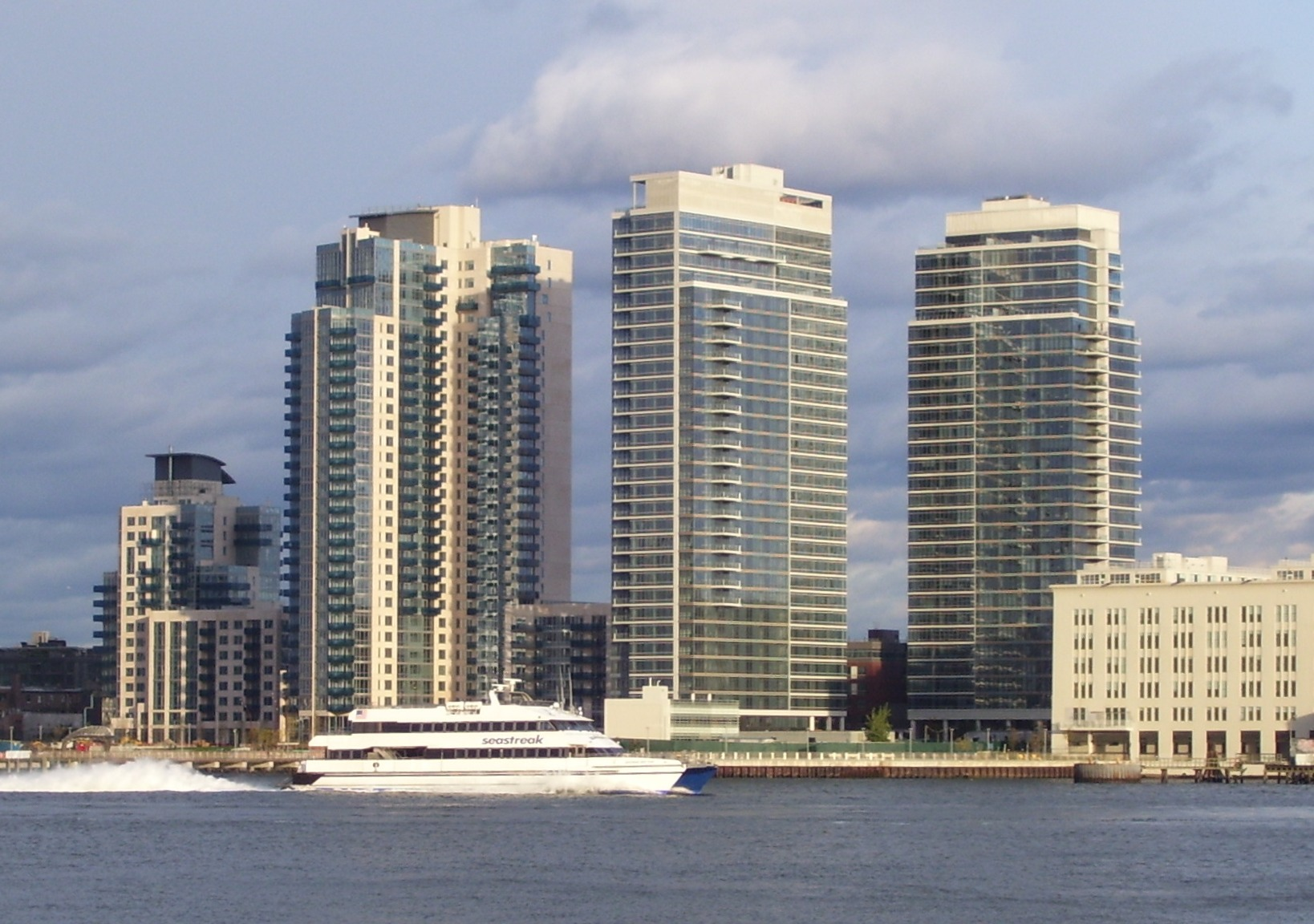
The Edge and Northside Piers developments on Kent Avenue include some of the many high-rise condominium buildings constructed as a result of the 2005 rezoning.

The rezoning represented a dramatic shift of approach from an emphasis on a creative, locally based economy in the 1990s to one largely dominated by corporations. The waterfront neighborhoods, once characterized by active manufacturing and other light industry interspersed with smaller residential buildings, were re-zoned primarily for residential high rise construction. Alongside the construction of high rises, many warehouses which served as centers for creative community-building events like the Cats Head, Flytrap, El Sensorium and Organism, were converted into expensive residential loft buildings. Among the first was the Smith-Gray Building, a turn-of-the-century structure recognizable by its blue cast-iron façade. The conversion of the former Gretsch music instrument factory garnered significant attention and controversy in the New York press primarily because it heralded the arrival in Williamsburg of Tribeca-style lofts and attracted, as residents and investors, a number of celebrities.

Officials championing the rezoning cited its economic benefits, the new waterfront promenades, and its inclusionary housing component – which offered developers large tax breaks in exchange for promises to rent about a third of the new housing units at "affordable" rates. Critics countered that similar set-asides for affordable housing have gone unfulfilled in previous large-scale developments, such as Battery Park City. The New York Times reported this proved to be the case in Williamsburg as well, as developers largely decided to forgo incentives to build affordable housing in inland areas.

== Land use ==
Williamsburg contains a variety of zoning districts, including manufacturing, commercial, residential, and mixed-use. North Williamsburg contains primarily light industrial and medium-density residential buildings, as well as some residential structures with commercial space on the ground floors. There are also high-density residential developments with commercial space, as well as a few remaining heavy industries, along the waterfront. The area around Broadway is primarily commercial, and contains stores and offices. On the other hand, South Williamsburg is largely medium-to-high density residential, with some commercial space on the ground floors.

=== Landmarked buildings ===
==== City landmarks ====
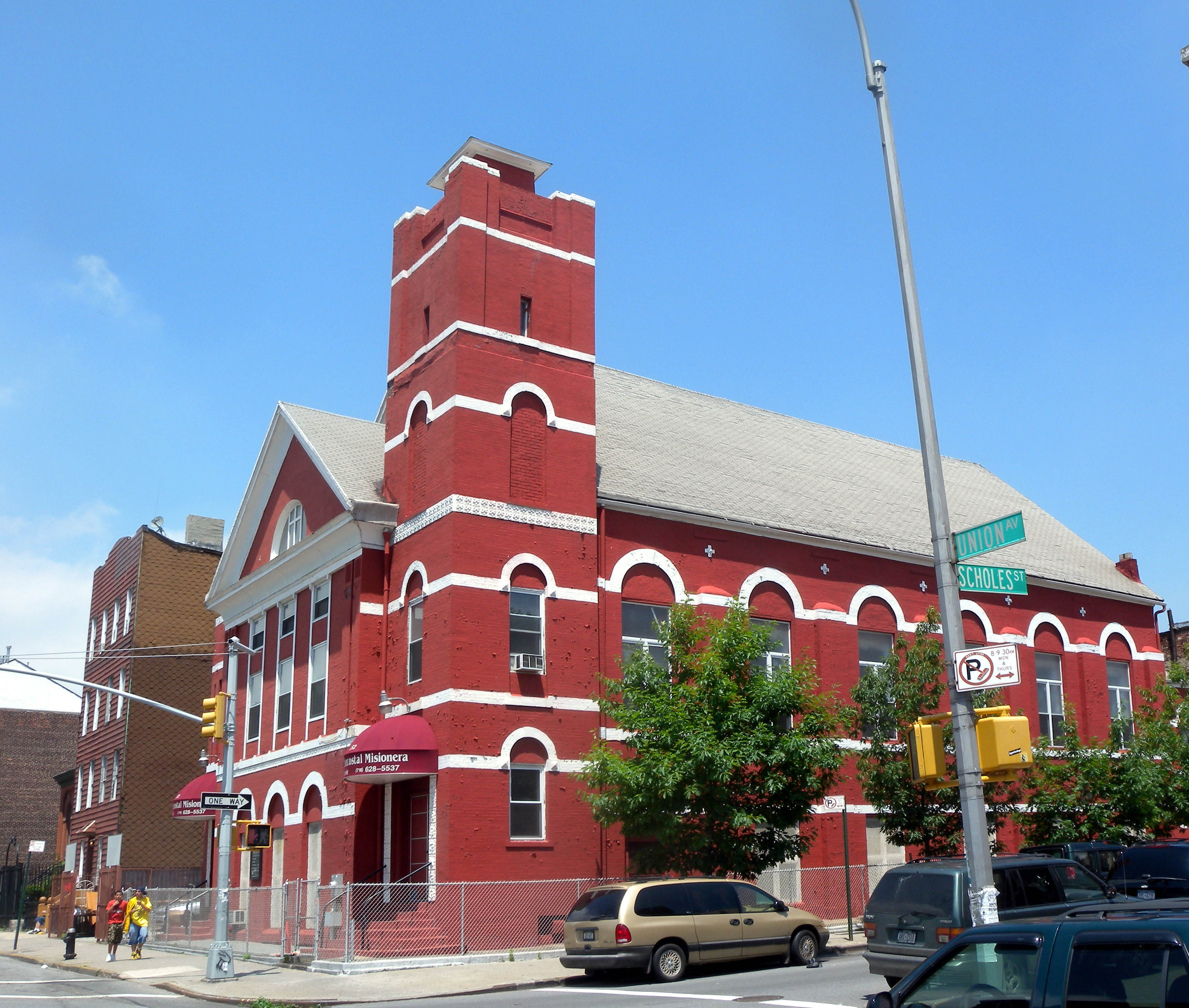
Pentecostal church

Several structures in Williamsburg have been landmarked by the city's Landmarks Preservation Commission. The Kings County Savings Institution, chartered in 1860, built the Kings County Savings Bank building at Bedford Avenue and Broadway. The structure, an example of French Second Empire architecture, has been on the National Register of Historic Places (NRHP) since 1980, and was made a New York City landmark in 1966.

The Williamsburg Houses were designated a city landmark on June 24, 2003. The 23.3-acre (9.4 ha) site, consisting of twenty 4-story buildings, was designed by William Lescaze, and was the first large-scale public housing in Brooklyn. It was completed in 1938, and is operated by the New York City Housing Authority.

In 2007, three buildings of the Domino Sugar Refinery were also designated New York City Landmarks. The original refinery was built in 1856, and by 1870 processed more than half of sugar used in the United States. A fire in 1882 caused the plant to be completely rebuilt in brick and stone; these buildings exist today, though the refinery stopped operating in 2004. In 2010, a developer proposed to convert the site to residential use; since them, a new plan was approved for the Domino Sugar Factory, led by Two Trees Management.

The New England Congregational Church and Rectory, built between 1852 and 1853, was listed on the NRHP in 1983. It is also a city landmark. The church was sold to its current occupant, La Iglesia Pentecostal La Luz del Mundo, in 1981.

One historic district also exists in Williamsburg, the Fillmore Place Historic District. Landmarked in 2009, it consists of several Italianate style buildings.

==== National Register of Historic Places listings ====
Numerous structures are also located on the NRHP, but are not city landmarks. The Austin, Nichols and Company Warehouse, built in 1915 to a design by architect Cass Gilbert, was placed on the NRHP in 2007. Originally also a city landmark, the designation was later rescinded. The warehouse was converted to apartments in the 2010s.

The German Evangelical Lutheran St. John's Church was built in 1883 and made a NRHP landmark in 2019.

Public School 71K, built in 1888–1889 to designs by James W. Naughton, was made a NRHP landmark in 1982, though it no longer serves as a public school.

The United States Post Office, built in 1936 by Louis A. Simon, was landmarked in 1988.

== Culture ==
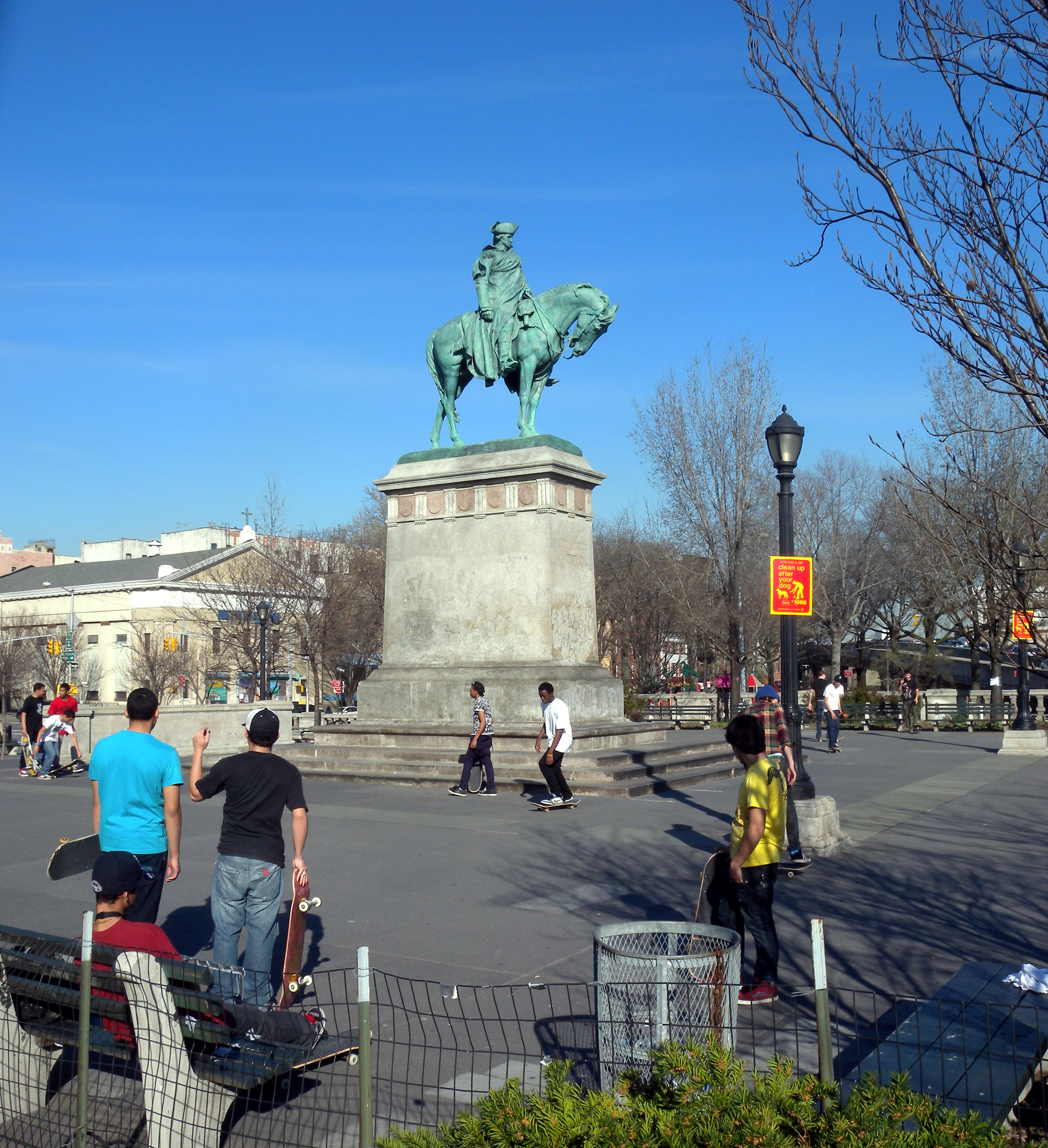
Continental Army Plaza, with the statue of George Washington

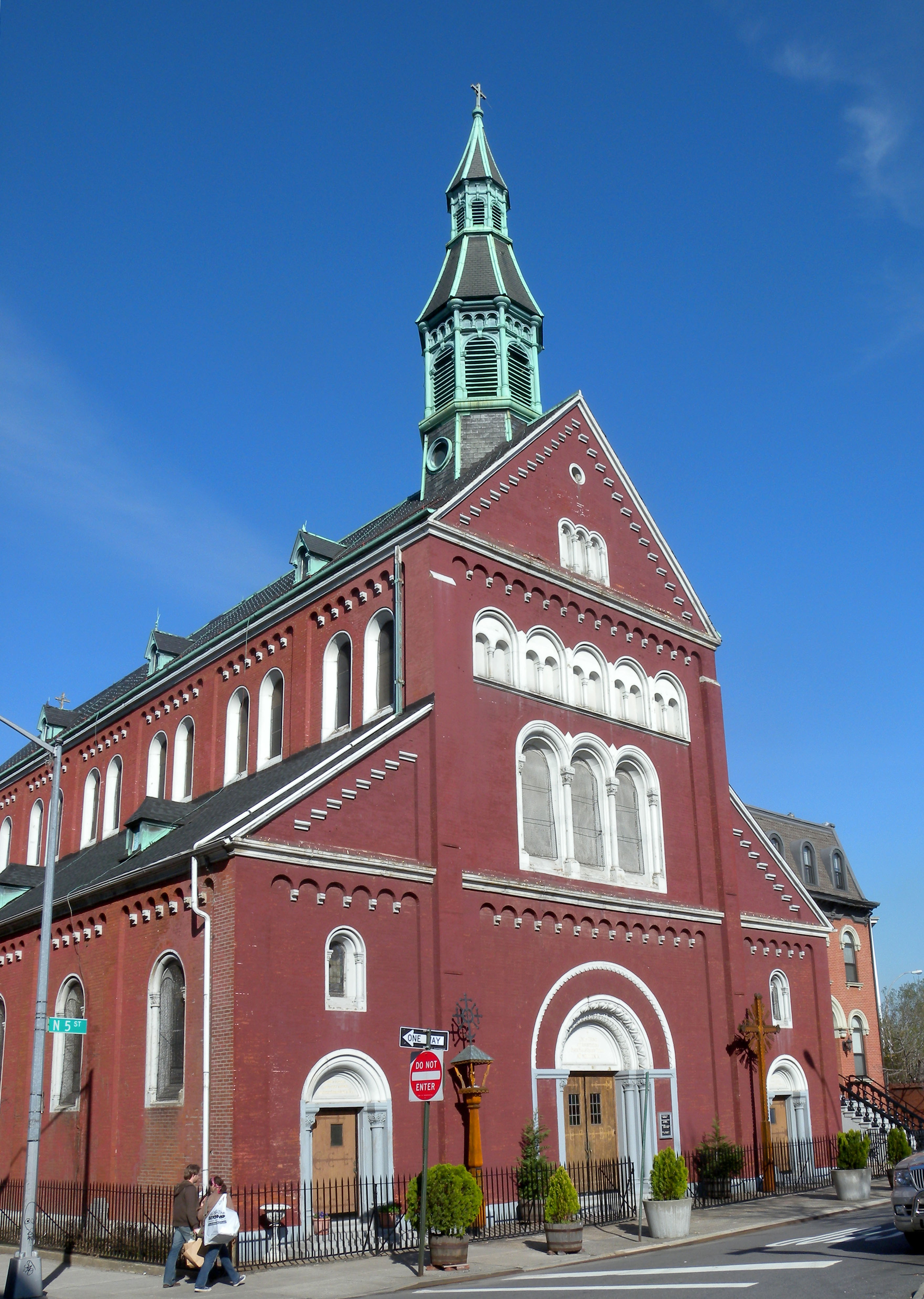
Roman Catholic Church of the Annunciation (1870, F. J. Berlenbach Jr.), North Side

The subdivisions within Williamsburg vary widely. "South Williamsburg" refers to the area which today is occupied mainly by the Yiddish-speaking Hasidim (predominantly Satmar Hasidim) and a considerable Puerto Rican population. North of this area (with Division Street or Broadway serving as a dividing line) is an area known as "Los Sures", occupied by Puerto Ricans and Dominicans. To the north of that is the "North Side", traditionally Polish and Italian. East Williamsburg is home to many industrial spaces, and forms the largely Italian American, African American, and Hispanic area between Williamsburg and Bushwick. South Williamsburg, the South Side, the North Side, Greenpoint, and East Williamsburg all form Brooklyn Community Board 1. Its proximity to Manhattan has made it popular with recently arrived residents who are often referred to under the blanket term "hipster". Bedford Avenue and its subway station, as the first stop in the neighborhood on the BMT Canarsie Line (on the L train), have become synonymous with this new wave of residents.

=== Ethnic communities ===
==== Hasidic Jewish community ====
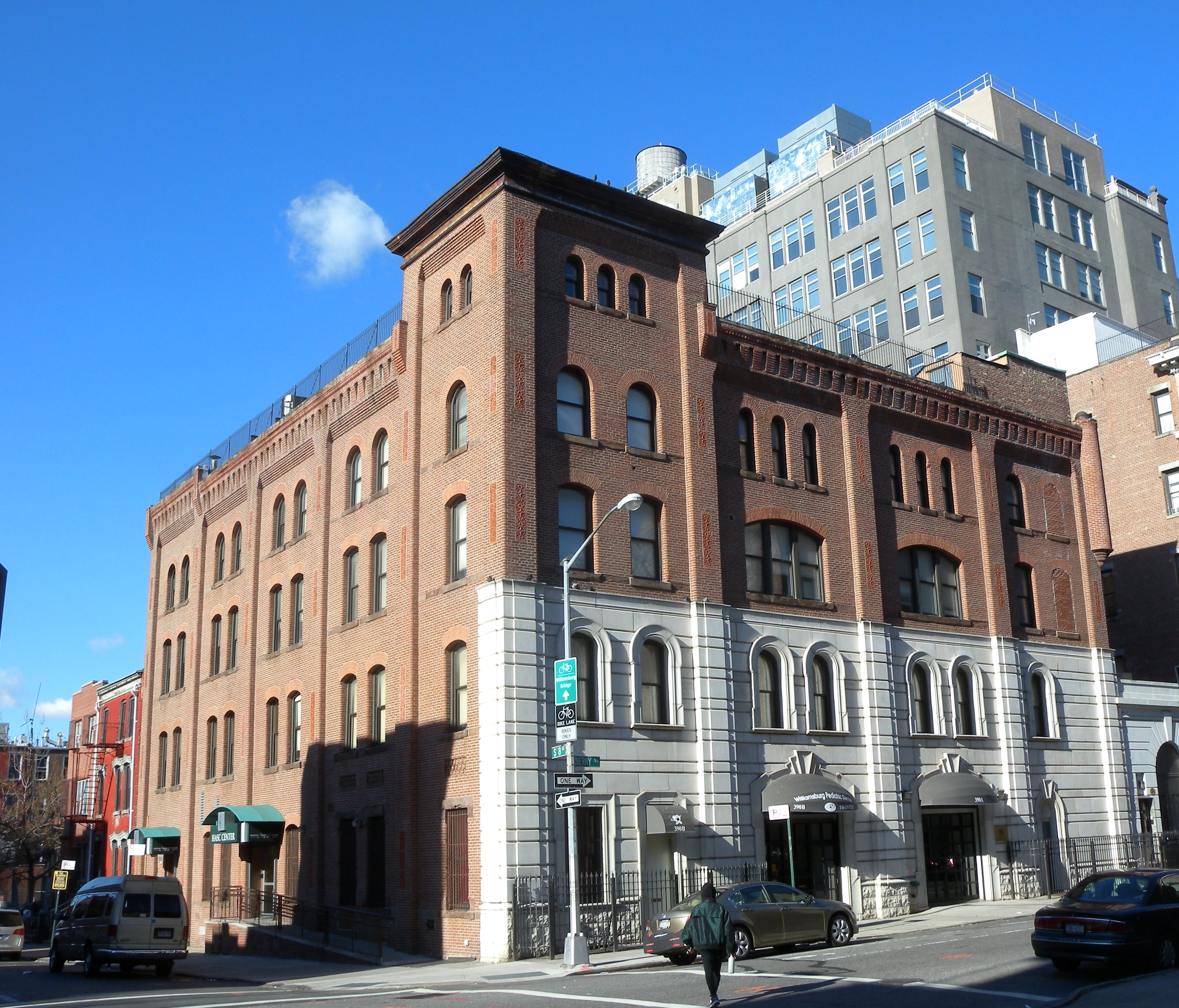
Hebrew Academy for Special Children

Williamsburg is inhabited by thousands of Hasidic Jews of various groups, and contains the headquarters of one faction of the Satmar Hasidic group. Williamsburg's Satmar population numbers about 57,000.

Hasidic Jews first moved to the neighborhood in the years prior to World War II, along with many other religious and non-religious Jews who sought to escape the difficult living conditions on Manhattan's Lower East Side. Beginning in the late 1940s and early 1950s, the area received a large concentration of Holocaust survivors, many of whom were Hasidic Jews from rural areas of Hungary and Romania. These people were led by several Hasidic leaders, among them the rebbes of Satmar, Klausenberg, Vien, Pupa, Tzehlem, and Skver. In addition, Williamsburg contained sizable numbers of religious, but non-Hasidic, Jews. The Rebbe of Satmar, Rabbi Joel Teitelbaum, ultimately exerted the most powerful influence over the community, causing many of the non-Satmars, especially the non-Hasidim, to leave. Teitelbaum was known for his fierce anti-Zionism and for his charismatic style of leadership.

In the late 1990s, Jewish developers renovated old warehouses and factories, turning them into housing. More than 500 apartments were approved in the three-year period following 1997; soon afterward, an area near Williamsburg's border with Bedford–Stuyvesant was re-zoned for affordable housing. By 1997, there were about 7,000 Hasidic families in Williamsburg, almost a third of whom took public assistance. The Hasidic community of Williamsburg has one of the highest birthrates in the country, with an average of eight children per family. Each year, the community celebrates between 800 and 900 weddings for young couples, who typically marry between the ages of 18 and 21. Because Hasidic men receive little secular education, and women tend to be homemakers, college degrees are rare, and economic opportunities lag far behind the rest of the population. In response to the almost 60% poverty rate in Jewish Williamsburg, the Metropolitan Council on Jewish Poverty, a beneficiary agency of the UJA-Federation of New York, partnered with Masbia in the opening of a 50-seat kosher soup kitchen on Lee Avenue in November 2009.

There are many households with Section 8 housing vouchers; in 2000, there were 1,394 voucher recipients in Williamsburg's nine Yiddish-speaking census tracts, but by 2014, Williamsburg had 3,296 voucher recipients within 12 Yiddish-speaking census tracts. In 2014, it was reported that Williamsburg's Jewish community had among the highest rates of applications for Section 8 housing vouchers. However, the newspaper New York Daily News doubted the legality of the applications. In 2016, the Daily News said that New York City census tracts with 30% or more of the population applying for Section 8 were present only in Williamsburg and the Bronx, except that Williamsburg's real estate, after the City of New York provided billions of dollars in tax abatements to developers, was becoming the most expensive real estate in the city.

A 2013 study by the UJA-Federation of New York identified Williamsburg as home to the second-fastest Jewish population growth in New York City, with a Jewish population of approximately 74,500 in 2011, a 41% increase from a decade earlier. Due to the neighborhood's rapid growth and high real estate prices, 77% of Jews in Williamsburg were renters, the highest rate in the city.

After the city subsidized developers in North Brooklyn, and longstanding local land owners from both North and South Williamsburg sold large blocks of land to the corporations, Hasidim have characterized the influx of new renters who had nothing to with land sales or city policy, as the artisten, or a "plague" and "a bitter decree from Heaven". Tensions have risen over housing costs, loud and boisterous nightlife events, and the introduction of bike lanes along Bedford Avenue. Although the effects of New York's development policies favoring high rise construction and luxury chain stores is increasing, many developers, such as Isaac Hager, continue to build more housing for Haredi tenants.

According to a 2024 UJA-Federation of New York survey, 74% of Jewish households in Williamsburg identified as Orthodox. The total Jewish population was an estimated 36,000 adults and 32,000 children.

==== Italian-American community and Our Lady of Mount Carmel ====
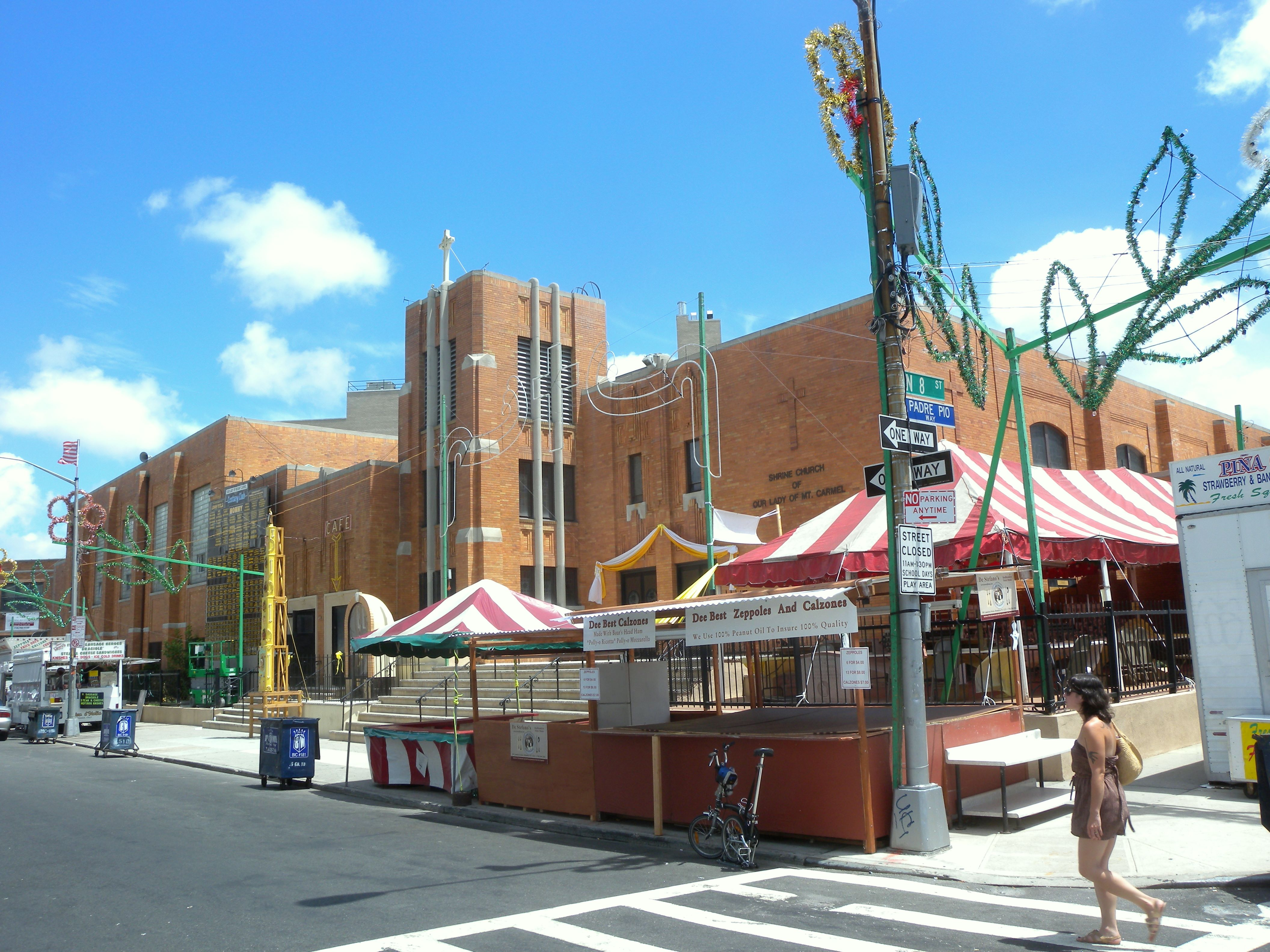
Our Lady of Mount Carmel Feast

A significant component of the Italian community on the North Side and East Side were immigrants from the city of Nola near Naples. Residents of Nola every summer celebrate the "Festa dei Gigli" (feast of lilies) in honor of St. Paulinus of Nola, who was bishop of Nola in the fifth century, and the immigrants brought this tradition over with them. For two weeks every summer, the streets surrounding Our Lady of Mount Carmel church, located on Havemeyer and North 8th Streets, are dedicated to a celebration of Italian culture.

A picture of the Carmine's Pizzeria restaurant and bar on Graham Avenue in Williamsburg, showing both sides of the family business. Fall 2026

The highlights of the feast are the "Giglio Sundays" when a 100-foot (30 m) tall statue, complete with band and a singer, is carried around the streets in honor of St. Paulinus and Our Lady of Mount Carmel. Clips of this awe-inspiring sight are often featured on NYC news broadcasts. A significant number of Italian-Americans still reside in the area, although the numbers have decreased over the years. The northeastern section of Williamsburg associated with "Italian Williamsburg" retains a significant Italian-American presence and is home to numerous Italian-American families, community centers, social clubs, businesses, and restaurants, such as Bamonte's, the Fortunato Brothers Cafe, Anthony and Son Panini Shoppe, Carmine and Son's, Emily's Pork Store, Napoli Bakery, Metropolitan Fish Market, Jr and Son, and Salerno Autobody. Sections of Graham Avenue in the Italian section are named Via Vespucci in honor of Amerigo Vespucci and the Italian character of the neighborhood. Despite the fact that an increasing number of Italian-Americans have moved away, many return each summer for the feast. The Giglio was the subject of a documentary, Heaven Touches Brooklyn in July, narrated by actors John Turturro and Michael Badalucco.

==== Puerto Rican and Dominican community ====
On Williamburg's Southside, also known in Spanish as "Los Sures", which is the area south of Grand Street, there exists a sizable Puerto Rican and Dominican population. Puerto Ricans have been coming to the area since the 1940s and the 1950s, and Dominicans came in the 1970s and 1980s. Many Puerto Ricans flocked to the area after World War II, due to the proximity to jobs at the Brooklyn Navy Yard. The neighborhood continues to have 27% Hispanic or Latino population, and Graham Avenue, between Grand Street and Broadway, is known as the "Avenue of Puerto Rico". Havemeyer Street is lined with Hispanic-owned bodegas and barber shops. However, even though the Southside has the highest concentration of Hispanics in the neighborhood, this population is dispersed throughout all of Williamsburg, as far north as the Williamsburg-Greenpoint border.

The Latino community has several cultural institutions in Williamsburg. The Caribbean Social Club, the last remaining Puerto Rican social club in Williamsburg, preserves the neighborhood's culture. Another such institution is the "El Puente" Community Center, as well as the "San German" record store on Graham Avenue. Graham Avenue was renamed Avenue of Puerto Rico as a symbol of pride, just as the avenue's other alternate name, Via Vespucci, is meant to commemorate the neighborhood's Italian-American community. Banco Popular de Puerto Rico has a branch on Graham Avenue. In addition, Southside United HDFC is a charity organization that helps residents with housing needs and other services, including mobilizing housing activists and residents, as well as providing affordable housing. The Moore Street Market, often referred to as La Marqueta de Williamsburg, is located at 110 Moore Street.

In addition, there have been several cultural events. In the past, Southside United HDFC has held Puerto Rican Heritage as well as Dominican Independence Day celebrations, and currently operates El Museo De Los Sures. The name "El Museo De Los Sures" roughly translates to "The Museum of the Southside". Williamsburg is also home to not one, but two campuses of Boricua College: the Northside campus on North 6th Street, between Bedford Avenue and Driggs Avenue; as well as the East Williamburg/Bushwick campus on Graham Avenue. A place popular among Dominican-American residents is the Fula Lounge, where Merengue and Raggaeton artists from the Dominican Republic often frequent. Once a year, the Williamsburg/Bushwick community hosts a Puerto Rican Day parade.

The neighborhood has produced many prominent Latinos. Television chef Daisy Martinez, who specializes in Puerto Rican cuisine grew up in the neighborhood. The neighborhood also is home to the office of U.S. representative Nydia Velázquez. In addition to this, Williamsburg was the childhood home of City Councilwoman Rosie Méndez, of Puerto Rican descent. Williamsburg itself was represented in the City Council by Dominican American Antonio Reynoso. The Hispanic sector as a whole was represented in a documentary called Living Los Sures, which documents the lives of Latino residents living in 1984 Southside before gentrification. Another documentary in 2013, Toñita's, depicts the Caribbean Social Club, and is named after the club's owner.

==== Ethnic and inter-cultural tensions ====
Around 2:00 a.m. on November 7, 1854, a riot occurred between sheriffs and "some Irishmen" at the poll of the First District, at the corner of 2nd and North 6th streets, in Williamsburg. It began after a deputy approached a citizen, and a fight started. Immediately, eight or ten deputies began freely using clubs on a group of "about one hundred Irishmen", resulting in a half-hour general fight and many injuries.

Prior to the corporatization of Williamsburg in the new millennium, the district often saw tension between its Hasidic population and its black and Hispanic groups. In response to decades of rising crime in the area, the Hasidim created a volunteer patrol organization, called "Shomrim" ("guardians" in Hebrew), to perform citizens' arrests, and to keep an eye out for crime. Over the years, the Shomrim have been accused of racism and brutality against blacks and Hispanics. In 2009, Yakov Horowitz, a member of Shomrim, was charged with assault, for striking a Latino adolescent on the nose with his Walkie Talkie. In 2014, five members of the Hasidic community, at least two of whom were Shomrim members, were arrested in connection with the December 2013 "gang assault" of a black gay man.

The mid-century tension between the Hasidic and Modern Orthodox Jewish communities in Williamsburg was depicted in Chaim Potok's novels The Chosen (1967), The Promise, and My Name Is Asher Lev. One contemporary female perspective on life in the Satmar community in Williamsburg is offered by Deborah Feldman's autobiographical Unorthodox: The Scandalous Rejection of My Hasidic Roots. The Netflix miniseries Unorthodox is loosely based on Feldman's autobiography.

=== Arts community ===
==== Visual and interdisciplinary art ====
The first artists moved to Williamsburg in the 1970s, drawn by the low rents, large floor area, and convenient transportation. This continued through the 1980s and increased significantly in the 1990s as earlier destinations such as SoHo and the East Village became occupied by wealthier populations. In the 1990s the Brooklyn Immersionists movement produced art and music in Williamsburg.

By 1996 Williamsburg had accumulated an artist population of about 3,000. Art galleries, interdisciplinary venues and immersive theater groups in the area included Sideshow Gallery, Minor Injury Gallery, The Lizard's Tail Cabaret, Nerve Circle, Epoché, The Green Room, Test-Site, Hit and Run Theater, El Sensorium, The AlulA Dimension, Mustard, Pierogi 2000 Gallery, Momenta Gallery, Galapagos Art Space and the Front Room Gallery. Williamsburg and Greenpoint are served by a monthly galleries listings magazine, wagmag. Local arts media that began a discourse on neighborhood involvement in the early 1990s included Breukelen, The Curse, The Nose, The Outpost, Waterfront Week, Worm Magazine and (718) Subwire.

In September 2000, 11211 Magazine launched a four color glossy circulating 10,000 copies in Brooklyn and Manhattan. The publication focused on the historical and notable properties, arts and culture, and real estate development of the 11211 ZIP Code. Other publications attributed to 11211 Magazine: Fortnight, The Box Map (2002), Appetite, and 10003 Magazine for the East Village in New York City. The magazine had published 36 issues (548,000 copies) of 11211 over a six-year period, and ceased circulation in 2006.

==== Music ====
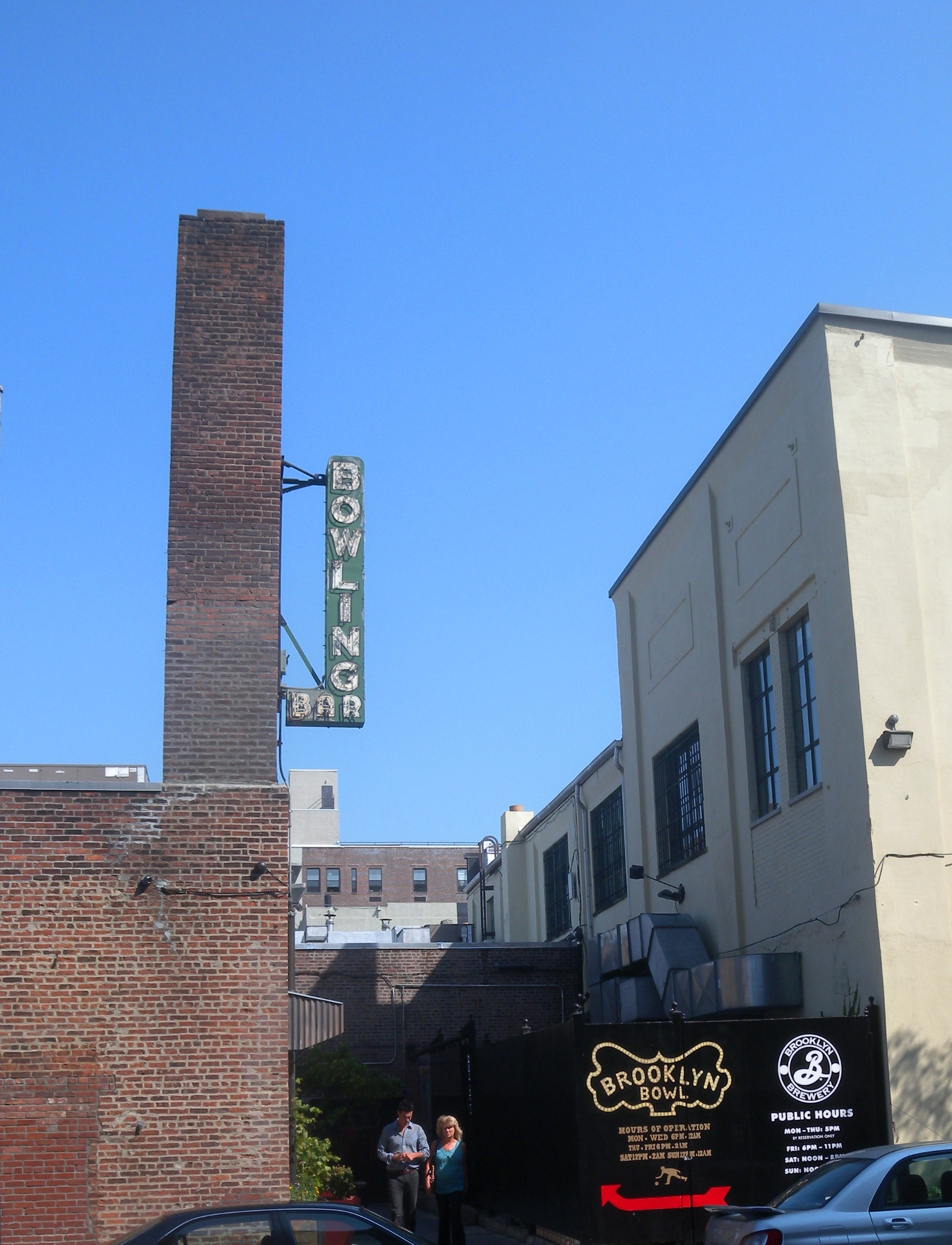
A local bowling center also presents musical performances

Williamsburg has become a notable home for live music and an incubator for new bands. Beginning in the late 1980s, and through the late 1990s, a number of unlicensed performance, theater, and music venues operated in abandoned industrial buildings and other spaces in the streets. A new culture has evolved in the area surrounding Bedford Avenue subway station. Venues attracted a mix of artists, musicians and the urban underground for late night music, dance, and performance events, which were occasionally interrupted and the venues temporarily closed by the fire department.

The first large gathering of artists and musicians, with nearly 100 presenters and hundreds of attendees, took place at a three-day festival with the humorous name, The Sex Salon. The event opened on Valentine's Day, 1990 at Epoché, a warehouse space located near the Williamsburg Bridge. Five months later another interdisciplinary event, the Cat's Head, opened in a section of the Old Dutch Mustard Factory on N. 1st Street. Soon after that a series of other warehouse and street events merged live music, dancing and other art forms: Cats Head II, Flytrap, Human Fest (I & II), El Sensorium and Organism.

Taking over most of the Old Dutch Mustard Factory on June 12, 1993, Organism drew in more than 2,000 people according to Newsweek, and was described by Suzan Wines in Domus Magazine as a "climax to the renegade activity" that was emerging in Williamsburg in the 1990s. A fusion of urban environmentalism and interdisciplinary culture, the entire generation of experimental venues, events and zines in the 1990s has come to be known as the Brooklyn Immersionists and celebrated in art and music history books such as Cisco Bradley's The Williamsburg Avant-Garde: Experimental Music and Sound on the Brooklyn Waterfront. Films have covered the movement such as Marcin Ramocki's Brooklyn DIY, which premiered at the Museum of Modern Art in 2009.

These events eventually diminished in number as chain stores and high rises moved into the area, rents rose, and regulations were enforced. A number of smaller, fleeting spaces, and several Manhattan-based venues also opened locations here. In the summers of 2006, 2007, and 2008, events including concerts, movies, and dance performances were staged at the previously abandoned pool at McCarren Park in Greenpoint. Starting in 2009, these pool parties are now held at the Williamsburg waterfront.

The neighborhood's funk, soul and worldbeat music scene has been spearheaded by labels such as Daptone and Truth & Soul Records and fronted by acts such as the Antibalas Afrobeat Orchestra and Sharon Jones & The Dap-Kings. Classic jazz is performed full-time at restaurant venues like Zebulon and Moto. More avant and noise music is found at venues like the Lucky Cat, B.P.M., Monkeytown (closed in 2010), and Eat Records. A Latin Jazz community continues among the Caribbean community in Southside and East Williamsburg, centered around the many social clubs in the neighborhood. In the early 2000s, the neighborhood also became a center of electroclash. Friday and Saturday parties at Club Luxx (now Trash) introduced electronic acts like W.I.T., A.R.E. Weapons, Fischerspooner, and Scissor Sisters.

==== Theatre and cinema ====
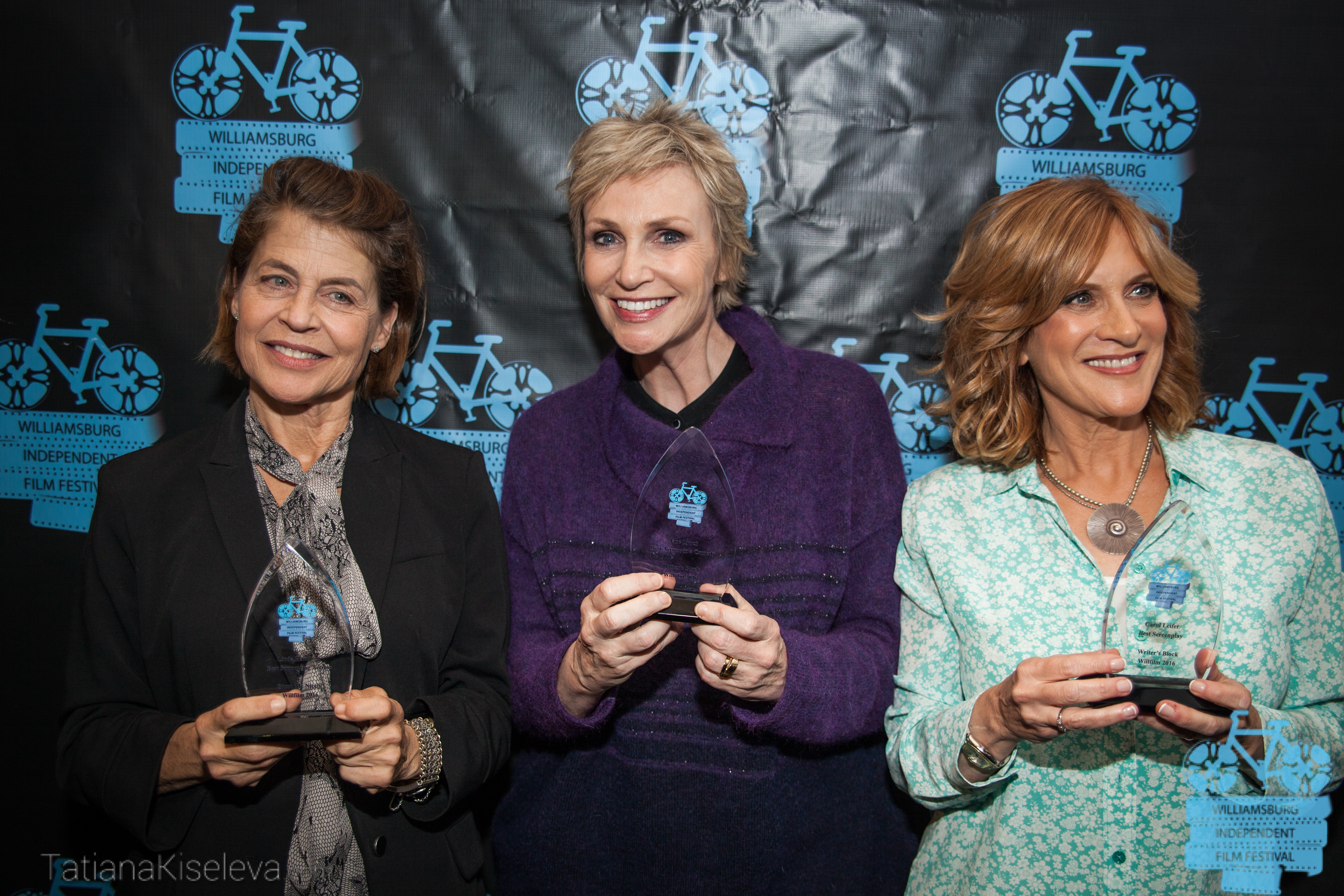
From left to right: Linda Hamilton, Jane Lynch, and Carol Leifer at the Williamsburg Independent Film Festival in 2016

In the 1990s a large number of experimental media groups and street theater troupes emerged in Williamsburg which deliberately situated their screens and interactive performances in social and physical environments. These Immersionist groups included the Floating Cinema, Fake Shop, Nerve Circle, The Outpost, Ocularis, The Pedestrian Project and Hit and Run Theater. Galapagos Art Space, which first opened in Williamsburg in 1996, hosted the Ocularis media collective's roof screenings and was a major host of New Burlesque theater. More recently Williamsburg contains indie theater spaces such as the Brick Theater. The Williamsburg Independent Film Festival was founded in 2010. Williamsburg also contains the first-run multiplex theater known as Williamsburg Cinemas, which opened on December 19, 2012.

=== Effects of corporate subsidization ===
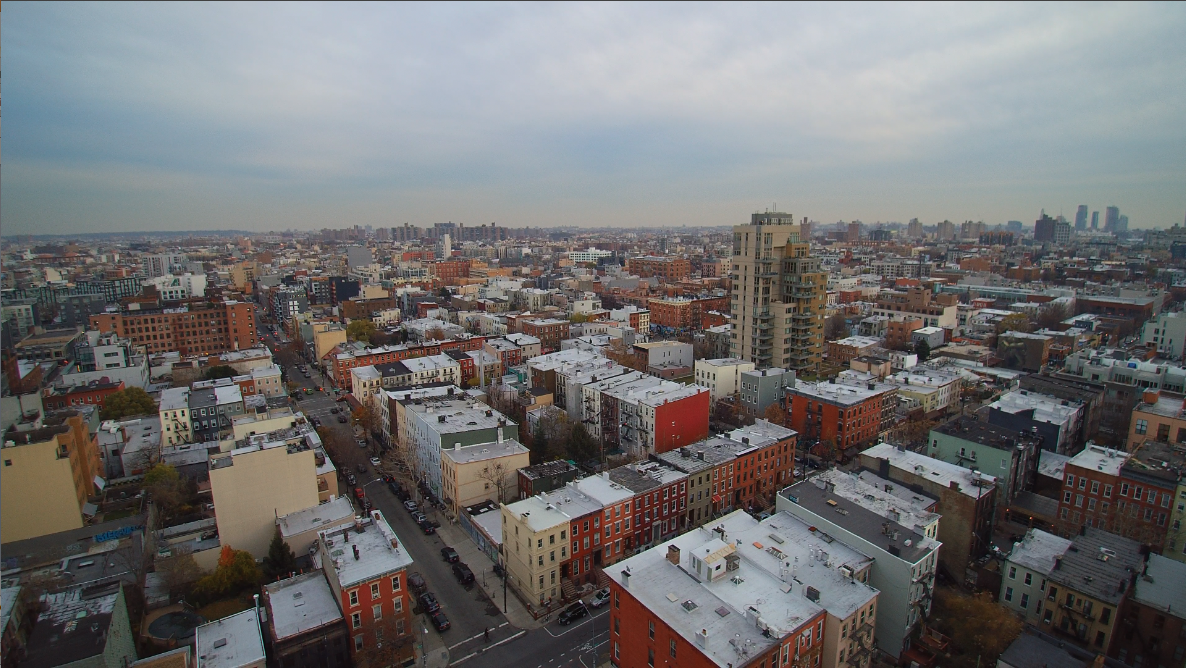
Williamsburg skyline, looking east.

Low rents were a major reason artists first started settling in the area, but that situation has drastically changed since the late-1990s when the City of New York began rezoning the district in favor of large developers. The City furthered the process by providing them billions of dollars in tax abatements. Russ Buettner and Ray Rivera point out in the New York Times that beginning in 2001, it wasn't the creative community or working class entrepreneurs, but rather the billionaire, Mayor Michael Bloomberg who "loosened the reins on development across the boroughs". Buettner and Rivera continue: "His administration poured $16 billion into financing to foster commercial development." New York City's Comptroller is then cited on such corporate welfare:

"Comptroller William C. Thompson has said the mayor focuses too much on large developments that go to favored builders who receive wasteful subsidies. When the new Yankee Stadium came up in Tuesday night's debate, he said: 'This is just another example of a giveaway, of the mayor's giveaway to another one of his developer friends in the city.'"

Free market dynamics like that exercised by individual home buying and selling, does describe what occurred when the City of New York its corporate welfare program in the late 1990s. Subsidization of corporations is not free market gentrification by definition, and in theory can be avoided by future communities attempting to keep creative local culture and businesses alive. Average monthly rents in Williamsburg can range from approximately $1,400 for a studio apartment to $1,600–2,400 for a one-bedroom and $2,600–4,000 for a two-bedroom. The price of land in Williamsburg has accelerated. The North Side, above Grand Street, which separates the North Side from the South Side, is somewhat more expensive, due to its proximity to the New York City Subway (specifically, the L train and G train on the BMT Canarsie Line and IND Crosstown Line, respectively).

More recent development and the route of the M train (whose route was modified to go from the downtown BMT Nassau Street Line to the mid-town IND Sixth Avenue Line in 2010), however, have prompted increases in rent prices south of Grand Street as well. Higher rents have driven many priced-out bohemians and artists to build new creative communities further afield in areas like Bushwick, Bedford-Stuyvesant, Fort Greene, Clinton Hill, Cobble Hill, and Red Hook. On July 1, 2011, the United States Postal Service (USPS) split the 11211 zip code, due to a "large increase in population and in the number of companies doing business in our area".

Williamsburg's takeover by corporate development is the subject of Princeton University film professor Su Friedrich's 2013 documentary Gut Renovation.

==== Effect on borough's court system ====
In June 2014, the New York Post reported that northwestern Brooklyn's growth of a wealthier population, especially in Williamsburg, has led to an increasing number of convictions against defendants in the borough's criminal cases, as well as to reductions in plaintiff's awards in civil cases. Brooklyn defense lawyer Julie Clark said that these new jurors are "much more trusting of police". Another lawyer, Arthur Aidala, said:

"Now, the grand juries have more law-and-order types in there. ... People who can afford to live in Brooklyn now don't have the experience of police officers throwing them against cars and searching them. A person who just moves here from Wisconsin or Wyoming, they can't relate to [that]. It doesn't sound credible to them."

== Demographics ==
For census purposes, the New York City government classifies Williamsburg as part of two neighborhood tabulation areas: Williamsburg, and North Side/South Side. Based on data from the 2010 United States census, the combined population of the Williamsburg and North Side/South Side areas was 78,700, a change of 6,301 (8%) from the 72,399 counted in 2000. Covering an area of 923.54 acres (373.74 ha), the neighborhood had a population density of 85.2 inhabitants per acre (54,500/sq mi; 21,100/km^{2}).

The racial make-up of the neighborhood was 66.5% (52,334) White, 26.3% (20,727) Hispanic or Latino, 2.9% (2,275) Asian, 2.8% (2,186) African American, 0.4% (361) from other races, and 1% (811) from two or more races.

The entirety of Community Board 1, which comprises Greenpoint and Williamsburg, had 199,190 inhabitants, as of NYC Health's 2018 Community Health Profile, with an average life expectancy of 81.1 years. This is about the same as the median life expectancy of 81.2 for all New York City neighborhoods. Most inhabitants are middle-aged adults and youth: 23% are between the ages of 0–17, 41% between 25 and 44, and 17% between 45 and 64. The ratio of college-aged and elderly residents was lower, at 10% and 9%, respectively.

As of 2016, the median household income in Community Board 1 was $76,608. In 2018, an estimated 17% of Greenpoint and Williamsburg residents lived in poverty, compared to 21% in all of Brooklyn and 20% in all of New York City. Less than one in fifteen residents (6%) were unemployed, compared to 9% in the rest of both Brooklyn and New York City. Rent burden, or the percentage of residents who have difficulty paying their rent, is 48% in Greenpoint and Williamsburg, slightly lower than the citywide and boroughwide rates of 52% and 51%, respectively. Based on this calculation, as of 2018, Greenpoint and Williamsburg are considered to be gentrifying.

New York City Department of City Planning tabulated in the 2020 census splitting up Williamsburg between north and south sections of the racial demographic populations. The north section, which is just regularly called Williamsburg had between 30,000 and 39,999 White residents and 10,000 to 19,999 Hispanic residents, meanwhile each the Black and Asian residents were less than 5000 residents. South Williamsburg also had 30,000 to 39,999 White residents, but each the Hispanic, Black, and Asian residents were less than 5000 residents.

== Police and crime ==
The majority of Williamsburg is patrolled by the 90th Precinct of the NYPD, located at 211 Union Avenue, while the northernmost section of Williamsburg falls under the 94th Precinct, located at 100 Meserole Avenue. The 90th Precinct ranked 47th safest out of 69 patrol areas for per-capita crime in 2010, and the 94th Precinct ranked 50th safest for per-capita crime. As of 2018, with a non-fatal assault rate of 34 per 100,000 people, Greenpoint and Williamsburg's rate of violent crimes per capita is less than that of the city as a whole. The incarceration rate of 305 per 100,000 people is lower than that of the city as a whole.

The 90th Precinct has a lower crime rate than in the 1990s, with crimes across all categories having decreased by 72.3% between 1990 and 2018. The precinct reported 4 murders, 16 rapes, 198 robberies, 237 felony assaults, 229 burglaries, 720 grand larcenies, and 90 grand larcenies auto in 2018. The 94th Precinct also has a lower crime rate than in the 1990s, with crimes across all categories having decreased by 72.9% between 1990 and 2018. The precinct reported 1 murder, 6 rapes, 63 robberies, 115 felony assaults, 141 burglaries, 535 grand larcenies, and 62 grand larcenies auto in 2018.

== Fire safety ==
The New York City Fire Department (FDNY) operates five fire stations in Williamsburg:

- Engine Company 211/Ladder Company 119 – 26 Hooper Street
- Engine Company 216/Ladder Company 108/Battalion 35 – 187 Union Avenue
- Engine Company 221/Ladder Company 104 – 161 South 2nd Street
- Engine Company 229/Ladder Company 146 – 75 Richardson Street
- Engine Company 209/Ladder Company 102/Battalion 34 – 850 Bedford Avenue

== Health ==
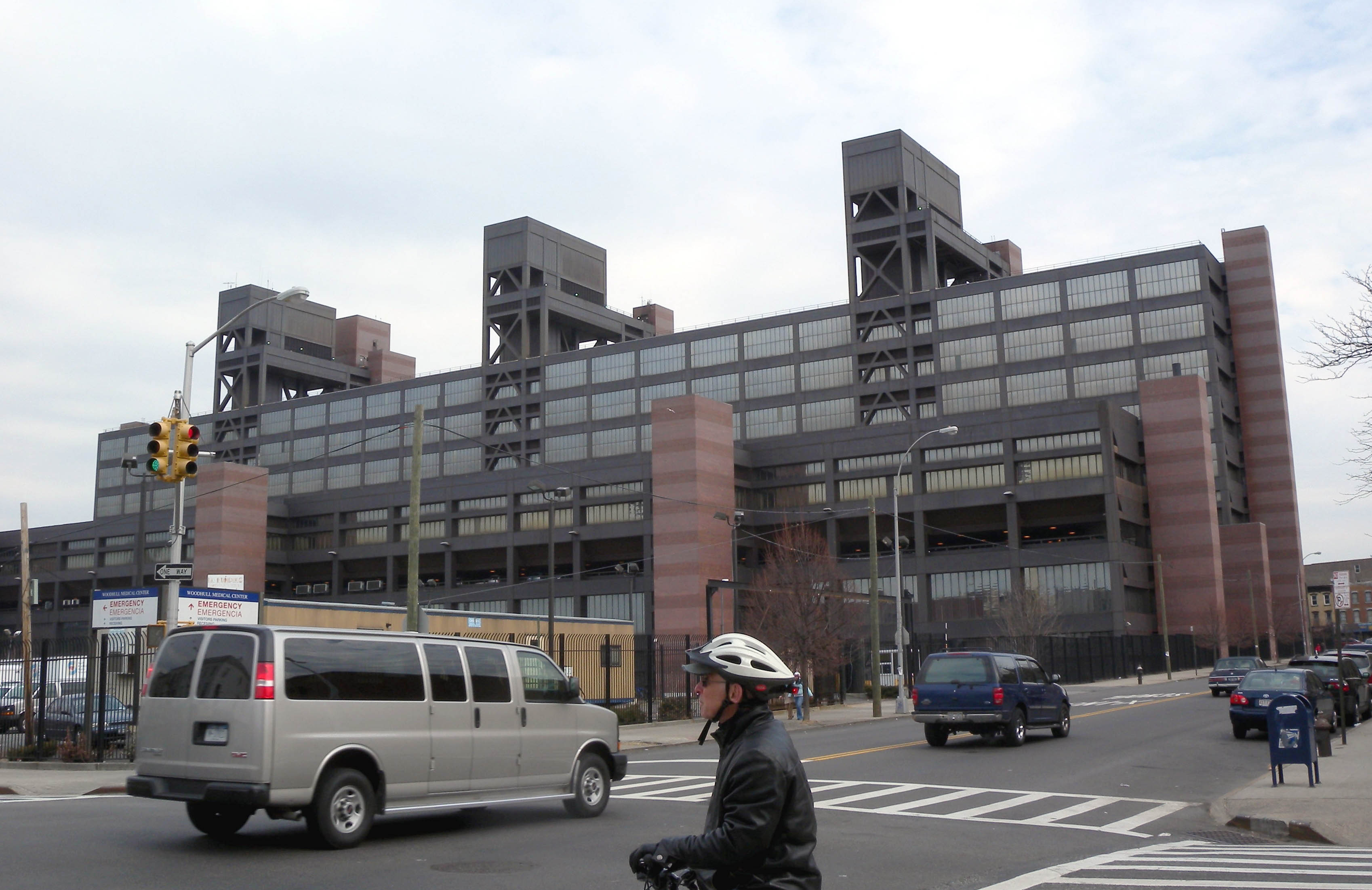
Woodhull Medical Center is the nearest large hospital, and it is located on Williamsburg's southern border with Bedford–Stuyvesant.

Pre-term and births to teenage mothers are less common in Greenpoint and Williamsburg than in other places citywide. In Greenpoint and Williamsburg, there were 54 pre-term births per 1,000 live births (the lowest in the city, compared to 87 per 1,000 citywide), and 16.0 births to teenage mothers per 1,000 live births (compared to 19.3 per 1,000 citywide). Greenpoint and Williamsburg has a relatively low population of residents who are uninsured, or who receive health care through Medicaid. In 2018, this population of uninsured residents was estimated to be 7%, which is lower than the citywide rate of 12%.

=== Air pollution ===
The concentration of fine particulate matter, the deadliest type of air pollutant, in Greenpoint and Williamsburg is 0.0096 milligrams per cubic metre (9.6×10^{−9} oz/ft^{3}), higher than the citywide and boroughwide averages. Seventeen percent of Greenpoint and Williamsburg residents are smokers, which is slightly higher than the city average of 14% of residents being smokers. In Greenpoint and Williamsburg, 23% of residents are obese, 11% are diabetic, and 25% have high blood pressure—compared to the citywide averages of 24%, 11%, and 28%, respectively. In addition, 23% of children are obese, compared to the citywide average of 20%.

Ninety-one percent of residents eat some fruits and vegetables every day, which is greater than the city's average of 87%. In 2018, 79% of residents described their health as "good", "very good", or "excellent", more than the city's average of 78%. For every supermarket in Greenpoint and Williamsburg, there are 25 bodegas.

There are several medical clinics in Williamsburg. The nearest large hospital is Woodhull Medical Center, on Williamsburg's southern border with Bedford–Stuyvesant.

=== Pre-hospital care ===
Hatzalah, a volunteer ambulance service, was founded in Williamsburg in 1965 after a Hasidic Jewish man died while waiting for an ambulance. Hatzolah of Williamsburg, a nonprofit organization, continues to operate within the neighborhood.

=== Incidents ===
In April 2019, after a measles outbreak in Williamsburg infected over 250 people, mandatory measles shots were ordered in the area. Mayor Bill de Blasio said that people in the neighborhood ignoring the order could be fined $1,000, and that religious schools and day care programs might be closed down if they did not exclude unvaccinated students. The outbreak in Brooklyn had been tied to an unvaccinated child who contracted the disease on a trip to Israel.

== Post offices and ZIP Codes ==
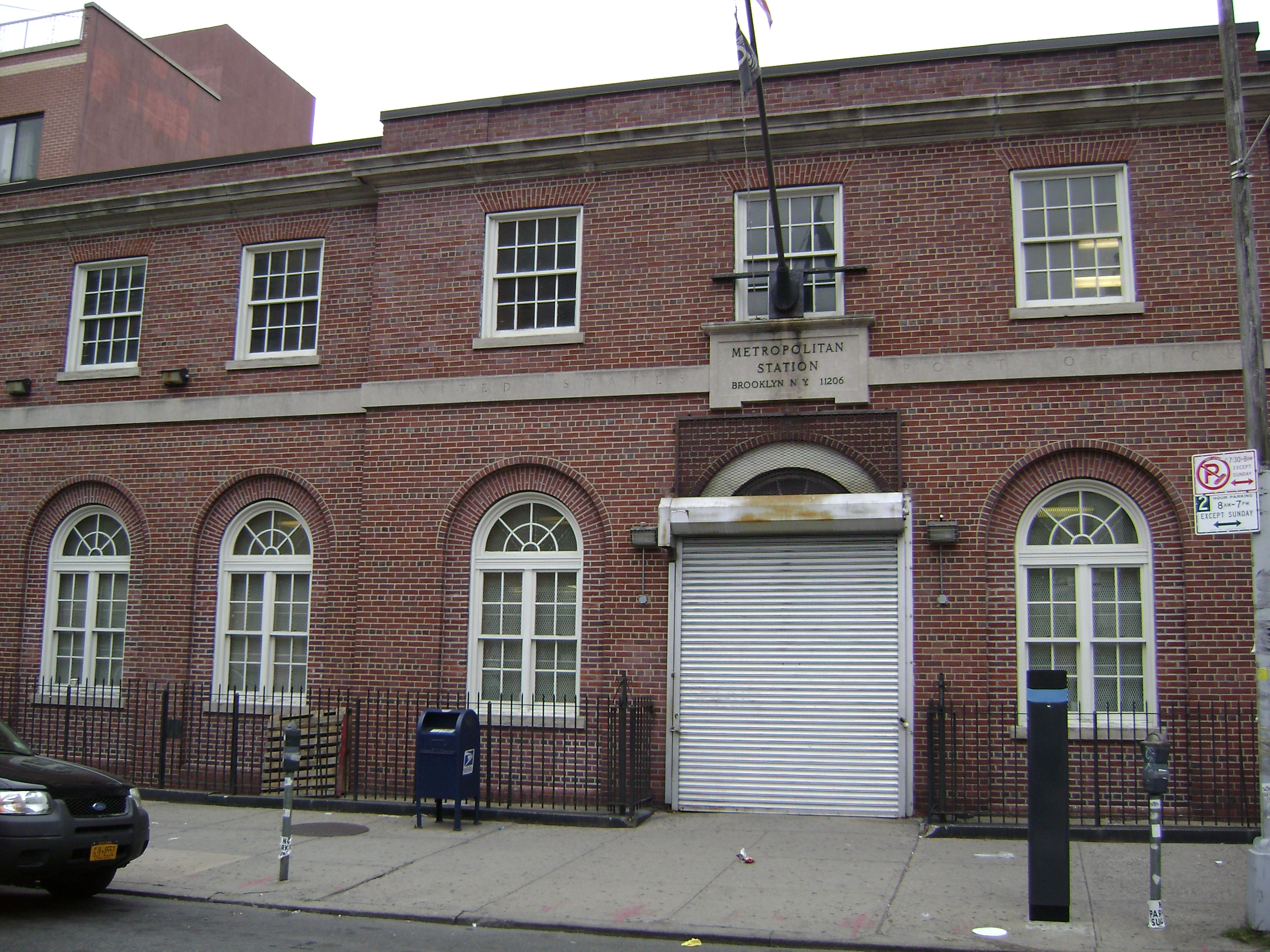
USPS Metropolitan Station

Williamsburg is covered by three ZIP Codes. Most of the neighborhood is in 11211, though the southeastern portion is in 11206, and the far western portion along the East River is in 11249. The United States Postal Service operates two post offices in Williamsburg: the Williamsburg Station at 263 South 4th Street, and the Metropolitan Station at 47 Debevoise Street.

== Education ==
Greenpoint and Williamsburg generally have a higher ratio of college-educated residents than the rest of the city as of 2018. Half of the population (50%) has a college education or higher, 17% have less than a high school education, and 33% are high school graduates or have some college education. By contrast, 40% of Brooklynites and 38% of city residents have a college education or higher. The percentage of Greenpoint and Williamsburg students excelling in reading and math has been increasing, with reading achievement rising from 35 percent in 2000 to 40 percent in 2011, and math achievement rising from 29 percent to 50 percent within the same time period.

Greenpoint and Williamsburg's rate of elementary school student absenteeism is slightly higher than the rest of New York City. In Greenpoint and Williamsburg, 21% of elementary school students missed twenty or more days per school year, compared to the citywide average of 20% of students. Additionally, 77% of high school students in Greenpoint and Williamsburg graduate on time, higher than the citywide average of 75% of students.

=== Schools ===
The New York City Department of Education operates public schools as part of District 14. The following public elementary schools in Williamsburg serve grades PK-5 unless otherwise noted:

- PS 16 Leonard Dunkly
- PS 17 Henry D. Woodworth
- PS 18 Edward Bush
- PS 84 Jose de Diego (grades PK-8)
- PS 132 Conselyea
- PS 147 Isaac Remsen, an empowerment school
- PS 196 Ten Eyck
- PS 250 George H. Lindsay
- PS 257 John F. Hylan
- PS 319 Walter Nowinski
- PS 380 John Wayne Elementary

Public middle and high schools include Brooklyn Latin School (a specialized high school serving grades 9–12) and IS 318 Eugenio Maria De Hostos (serving grades 6–8). The Grand Street Campus (formerly Eastern District High School) contains the High School of Enterprise, Business, & Technology (EBT), Progress High School for Professional Careers, High School for Legal Studies. The Harry Van Arsdale Educational Complex houses three small high schools that offer academics, and a curriculum and faculty for their special needs populations: Williamsburg High School for Architecture and Design, Williamsburg Preparatory School, Brooklyn Preparatory High School. The Young Women's Leadership School of Brooklyn aims to instill qualities of leadership in girls. There are several bilingual public schools in Williamsburg, including PS 84 Jose De Diego (offering Spanish-English), and Juan Morel Campos Secondary School (offering Yiddish-English).

Other schools in Williamsburg include El Puente Academy for Peace and Justice and the Ethical Community Charter School. Success Academy Williamsburg opened in August 2012. It is a public charter school. Williamsburg Collegiate Charter School, a consistently top-performing charter school in New York City, is located on the South side. Williamsburg Northside Schools are three Reggio Emilia-inspired schools that have three distinct programs within three locations: Infant and Toddler Center, Williamsburg Northside Preschool, and Williamsburg Northside Lower School.

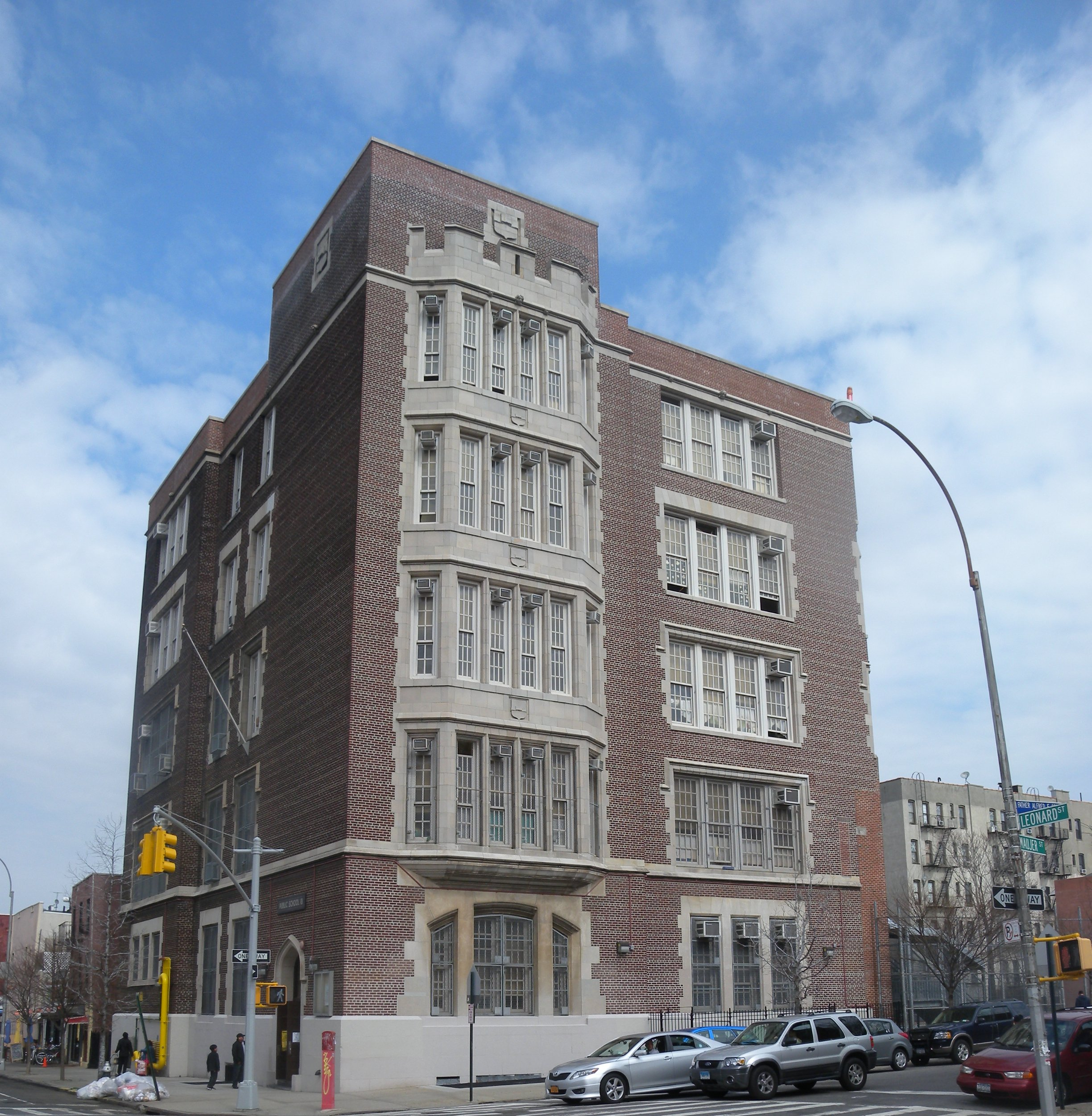
PS 18

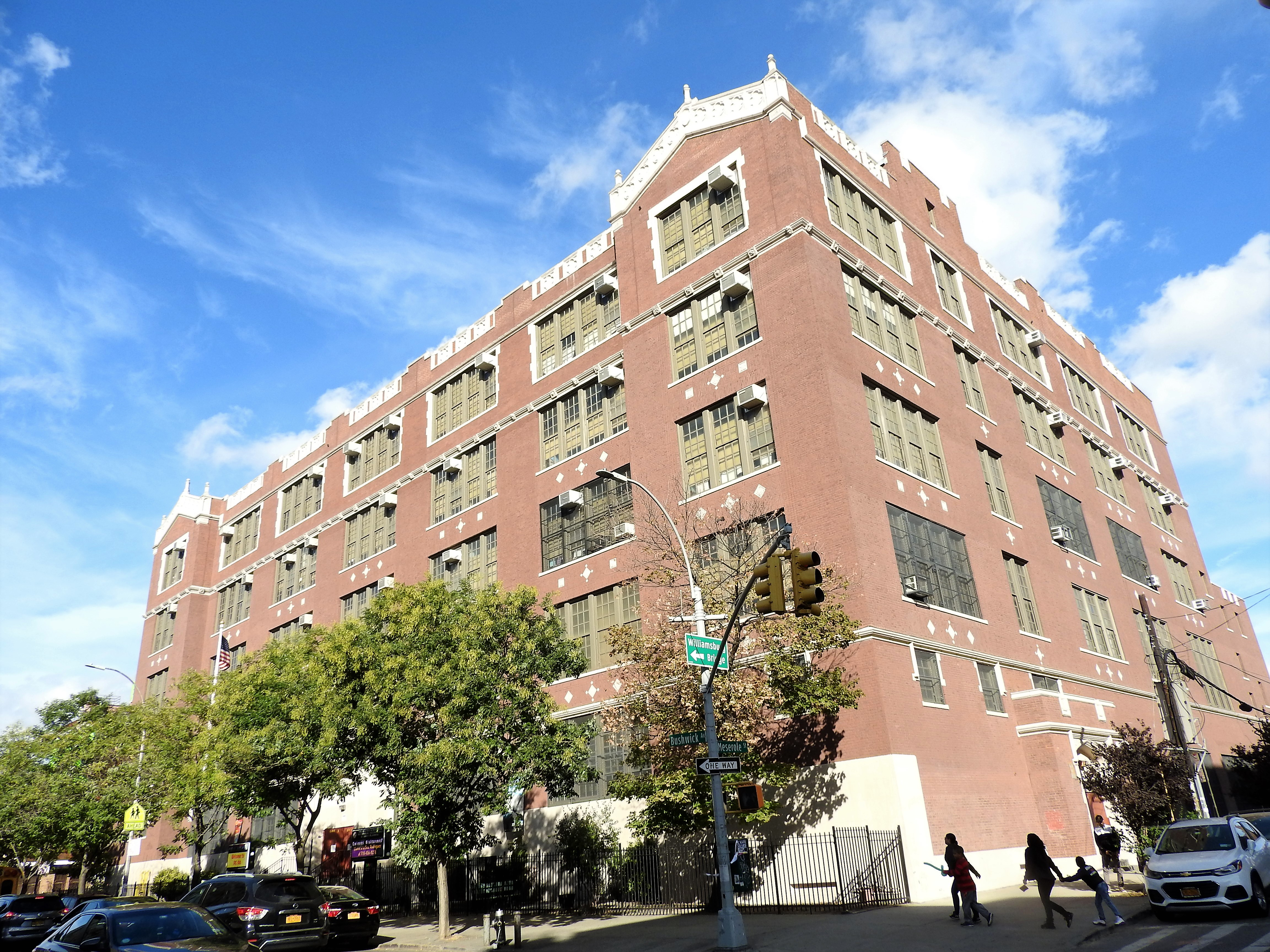
PS 196 Ten Eyck School

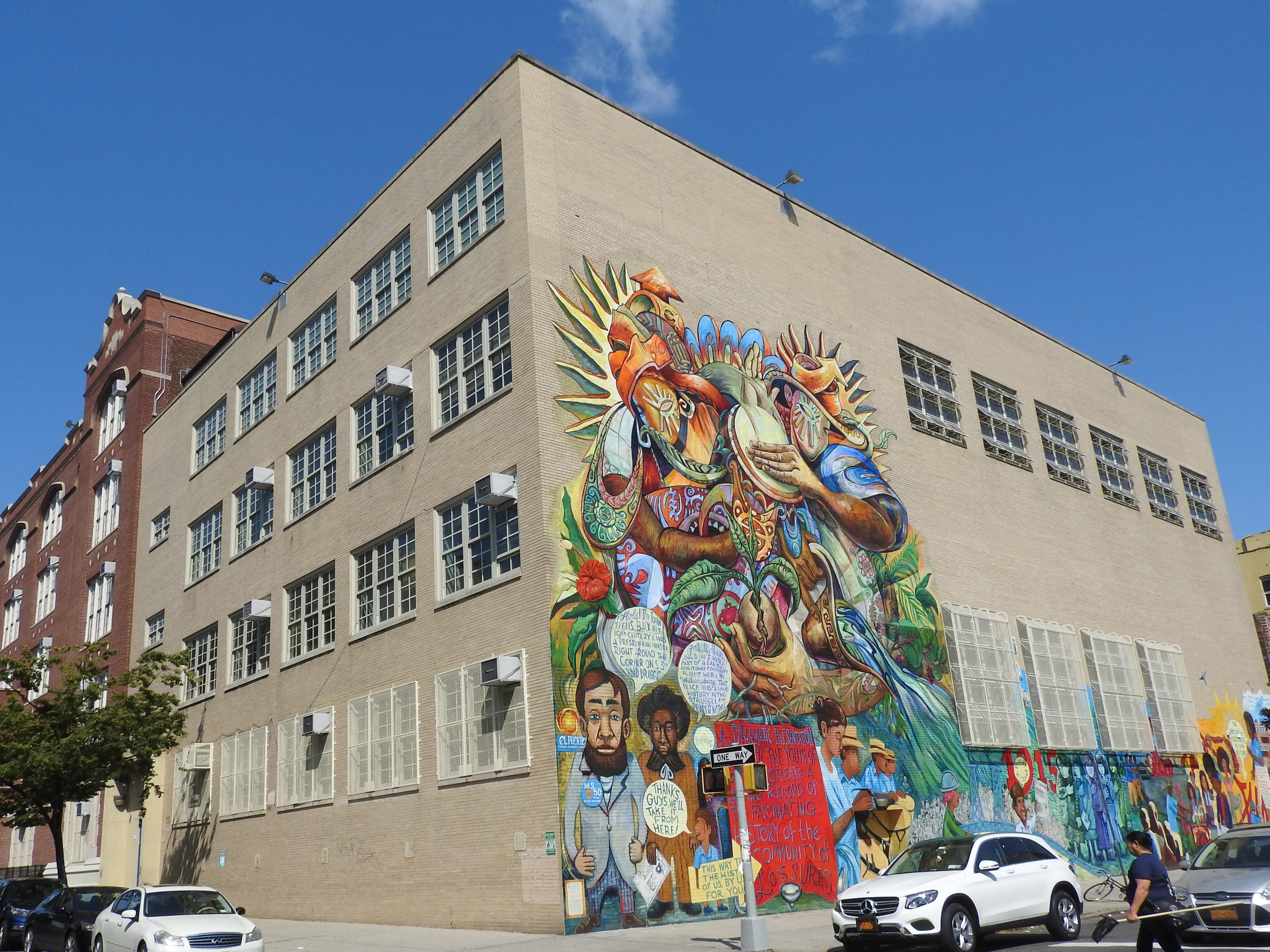
JHS 50 John D. Wells

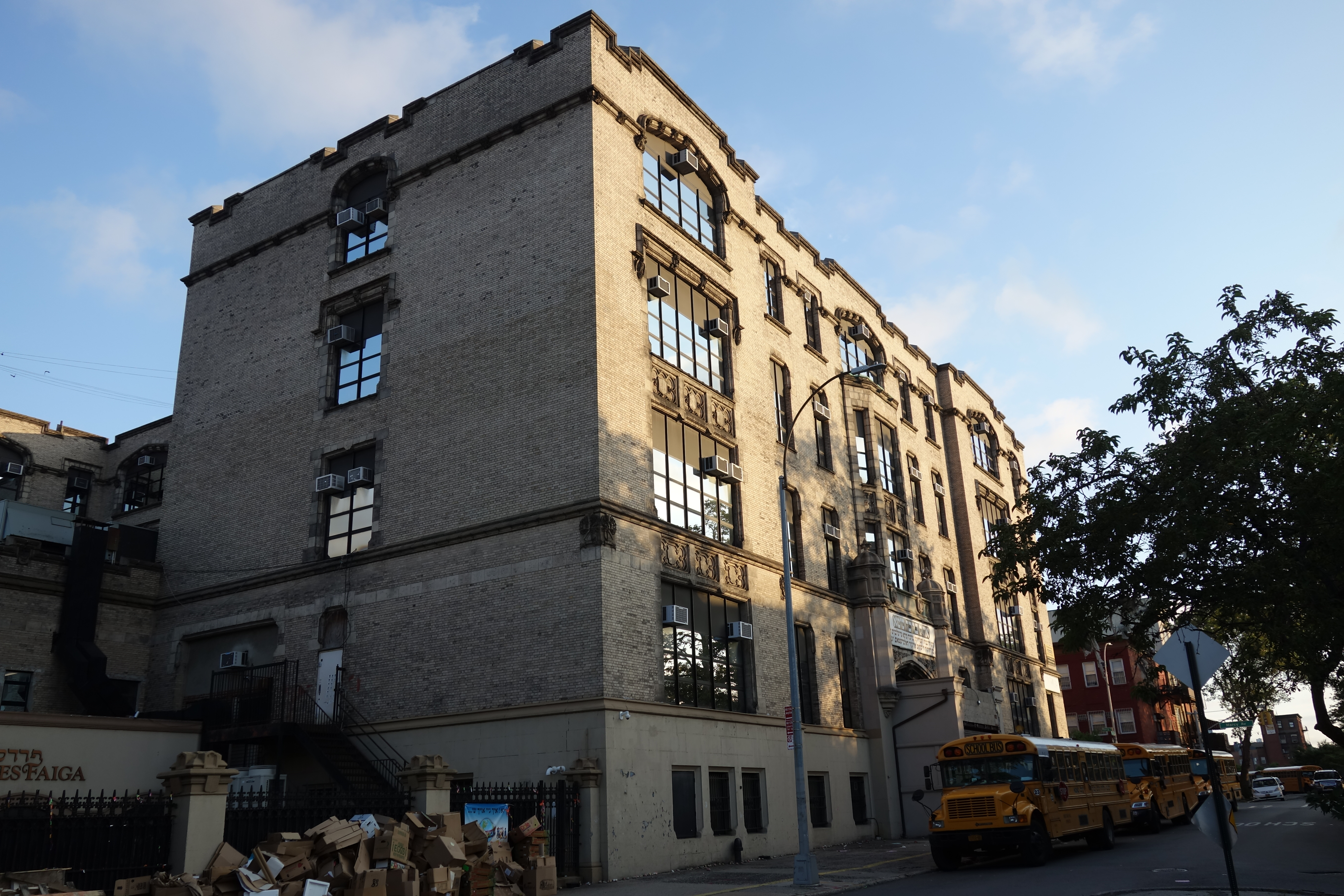
Former Eastern District High School

=== Libraries ===
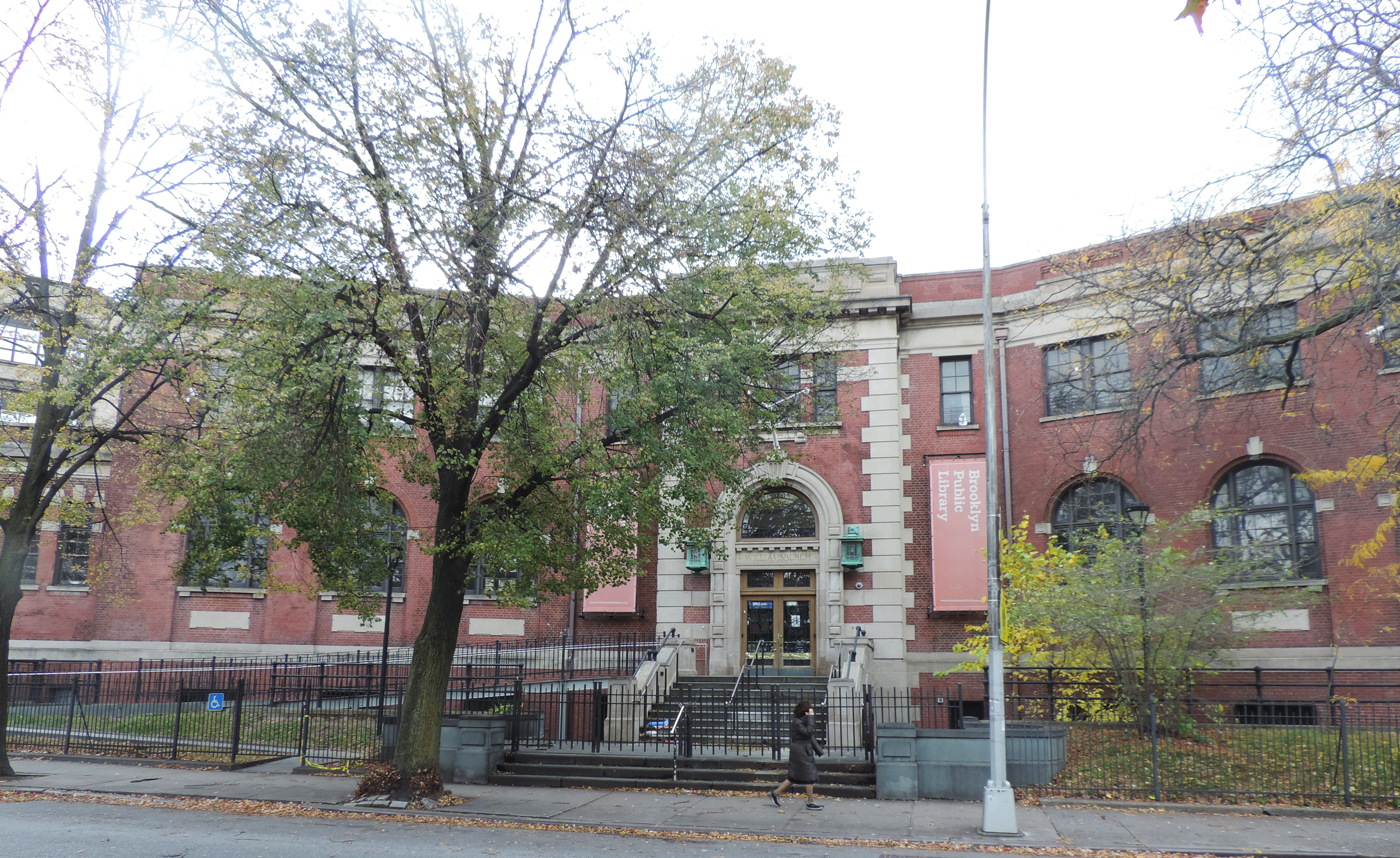
The BPL Williamsburgh branch

The Brooklyn Public Library (BPL) has two branches in Williamsburg. The Williamsburgh branch is located at 240 Division Avenue, near Marcy Avenue. It is housed in a 26,000-square-foot (2,400 m^{2}) Carnegie library structure that is one of Brooklyn's largest circulating-library buildings, and is a New York City designated landmark. The Leonard branch is located at 81 Devoe Street, near Leonard Street. It is located in a 26,000-square-foot (2,400 m^{2}) building that opened in 1908. The Leonard branch contains a tribute to Betty Smith, the author of the novel A Tree Grows in Brooklyn, whose main character, Francie, frequently visited the library.

== Transportation ==
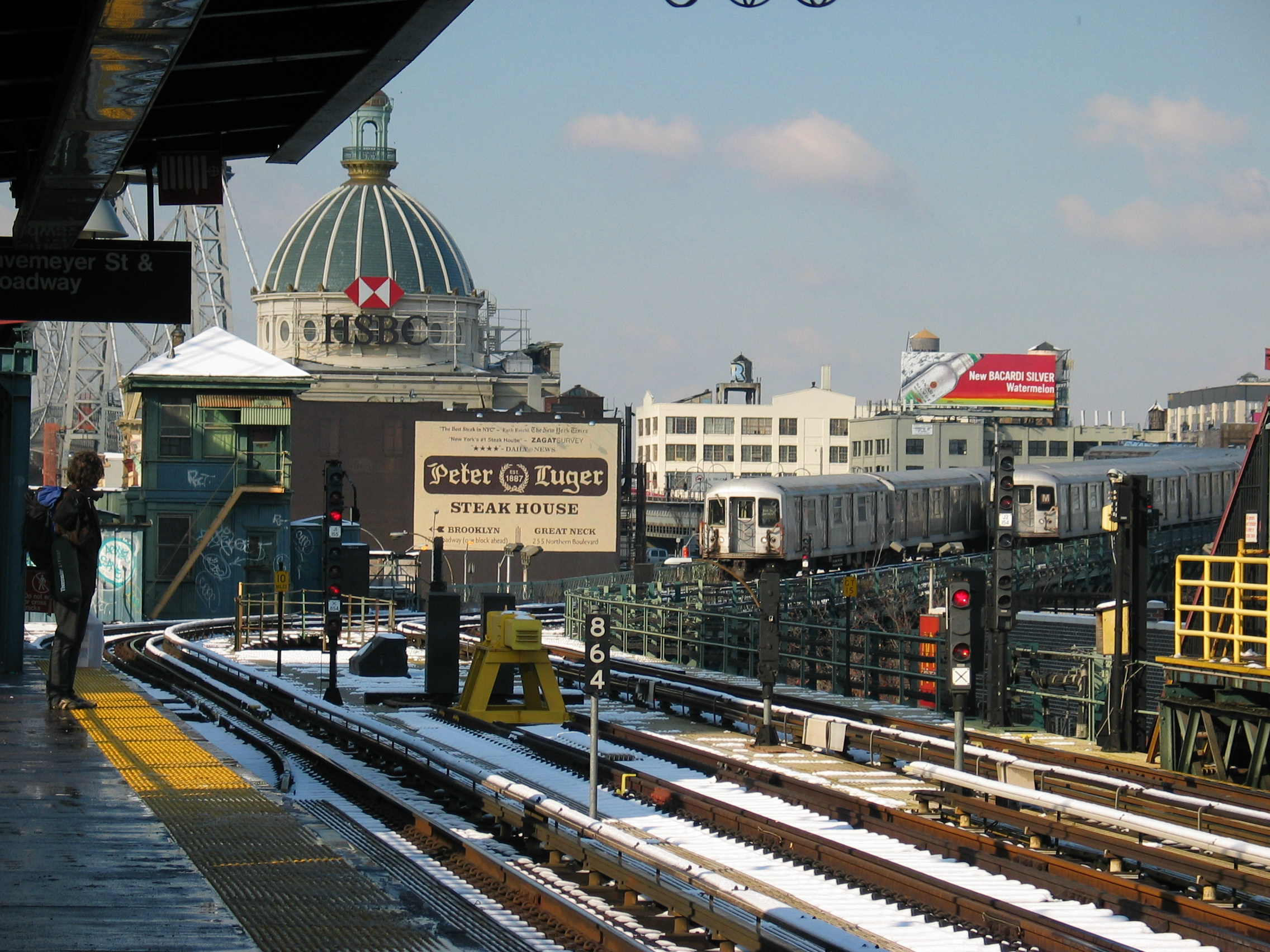
Trains entering and leaving Marcy Avenue station

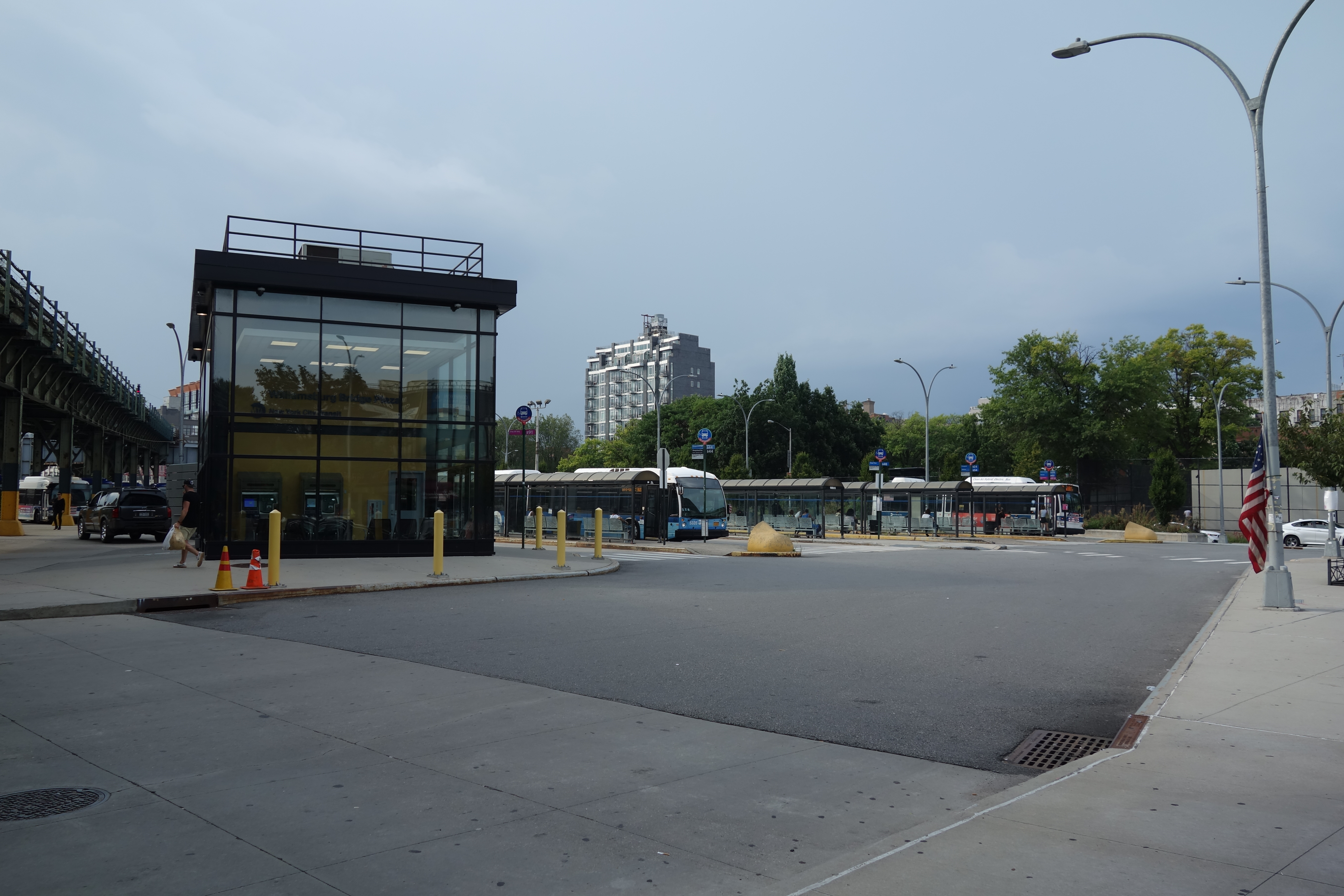
The Williamsburg Bridge Plaza Bus Terminal

Williamsburg is served by several New York City Subway routes. There are three physical lines through the neighborhood: the BMT Canarsie Line (L train) on the north, the BMT Jamaica Line (J, M, and Z trains) on the south, and the IND Crosstown Line (G train) on the east. The Williamsburg Bridge crosses the East River to the Lower East Side. Williamsburg is also served by the Brooklyn–Queens Expressway. Several bus routes, including the B24, B32, B39, B44, B44 SBS, B46, B60, Q54 and Q59, terminate at the Williamsburg Bridge / Washington Plaza. Other bus lines that run through the neighborhood include the B43, B48, B57, B62, B67 and B110.

In June 2011, NY Waterway started service to points along the East River. On May 1, 2017, that route became part of the NYC Ferry's East River route, which runs between Pier 11 / Wall Street in Manhattan's Financial District and the East 34th Street Ferry Landing in Murray Hill, Manhattan, with five intermediate stops in Brooklyn and Queens. Two of the East River Ferry's stops are in Williamsburg.

There are plans to build the Brooklyn–Queens Connector (BQX), a light rail system that would run along the waterfront from Red Hook through Williamsburg to Astoria in Queens. However, the system is projected to cost $2.7 billion, and the projected opening has been delayed until at least 2029.

== Parks and open spaces ==
Open spaces and parks in Williamsburg include:

- Bushwick Inlet Park
- Cooper Park
- Domino Park
- East River Park (Marsha P. Johnson State Park)
- Grand Ferry Park
- McCarren Park
- Northside Piers
- Williamsburg Waterfront
- Cooper Park

== Playgrounds ==
Playgrounds in Williamsburg include:

- Vincent V. Abate Playground
- William Sheridan Playground
- Jaime Campiz Playground
- Bedford Playground
- Msgr. McGolrick Playground
- Sternberg Playground
- Roebling Playground
- Ericsson Playground
- Newton Barge Playground
- Jacob's Ladder Playground

== Environmental concerns ==
El Puente, a local community development group, called Williamsburg "the most toxic place to live in America", in the documentary Toxic Brooklyn, produced by Vice Magazine in 2009. Other rare cancer clusters in Willamsburg have been reported by the New York Post.

=== Brooklyn Navy Yard incinerator plan ===
In 1976, Mayor Abraham Beame proposed building a combined incinerator and power plant at the nearby Brooklyn Navy Yard. The project garnered large community opposition from the Latino and Hasidic Jewish residents of southern Williamsburg, located next to the site of the proposed incinerator. Though the New York City Board of Estimate narrowly gave its approval to the incinerator in 1984, the state refused to grant a permit for constructing the plant for several years, citing that the city had no recycling plan. The proposed incinerator was a key issue in the 1989 mayoral election because the Hasidic Jewish residents of Williamsburg who opposed the incinerator were also politically powerful. David Dinkins, who ultimately won the 1989 mayoral election, campaigned on the stance that the Brooklyn Navy Yard incinerator plan should be put on hold. The state denied a permit for the incinerator in 1989, stating that the city had no plan for reducing ash emissions from the plant.

The plan was placed on hold for several years, and in 1995, community members filed a lawsuit to block the incinerator's construction. Further investigation of the incinerator's proposed site found toxic chemicals were present in such high levels that the site qualified for Superfund environmental clean-up. The next year, the city dropped plans for the construction of the incinerator altogether.

=== Bushwick Inlet Park site ===
National Grid (formerly KeySpan) is remediating contamination at a former Manufactured Gas Plant (MGP) site, located at Kent Avenue, between North 11th and North 12th Streets, in Williamsburg. The Remediation is being performed in conversion for the site's conversion into Bushwick Inlet Park. It is being implemented under an order of consent with the New York State Department of Environmental Conservation entered into between the NYSDEC and KeySpan in February 2007.

There are also ten oil storage tanks on the site of Bushwick Inlet Park that were formerly operated by Bayside Oil. A plan unveiled in 2016, called "Maker Park", would convert the oil tankers into attractions such as a theater and hanging gardens. It directly conflicted with the original plan for Bushwick Inlet Park, which would see the tankers demolished. The city stated that the oil tankers were heavily polluted, and that the site needed to be cleaned before it could be repurposed into a park.

== Notable residents ==
- Persis Foster Eames Albee (1836–1914) – first "Avon Lady"; moved out in 1866
- Red Auerbach (1917–2006) – former guard, NBA coach, and General manager who was inducted into the Basketball Hall of Fame.
- Joy Behar (born 1942) – comedian and co-host of The View (born in Williamsburg)
- Mel Brooks (born 1926) – comedian (born in Williamsburg)
- Cathy Bissoon (born 1968) – United States District Court judge for the Western District of Pennsylvania
- Steve Burns (born 1973) – former Blue's Clues host, actor, and musician
- Alexa Chung (born 1983) – English model and television presenter
- Peter Criss (born 1945) – of Kiss (childhood friend of Jerry Nolan, also a resident of Williamsburg) (born in Williamsburg).
- Raven Dennis (born 1967) – baker
- Dane DeHaan (born 1986) – actor, In Treatment, The Amazing Spider-Man 2.
- Alan Dershowitz (born 1938) – lawyer, jurist, and political commentator.
- Peter Dinklage (born 1969) – actor
- Ed Droste (born 1978) – lead singer for the indie rock band, Grizzly Bear.
- Sean Durkin (born 1981) – film director.
- Simon Dushinsky, co-owner of the New York City-based Rabsky Group with his partner, Isaac Rabinowitz
- Will Eisner – comic artist for whom the Eisner Award is named, born and raised in Williamsburg.
- Su Friedrich (born 1954) – filmmaker and Princeton University film professor
- Peaches Geldof (1989–2014) – British model and socialite
- Yoel Goldman, founder of the Brooklyn, New York-based development company, All Year Management
- Charles Gray (musician), Operatic Baritone and former guitarist of The Aquabats
- The Gregory Brothers – music group notable for Internet series, "Auto Tune the News"
- Isaac Hager, founder of the New York City-based Cornell Realty Management
- Randy Harrison (born 1977) – TV (Queer as Folk) and theatre actor
- Eve Hewson (born 1991), actress who appeared in the film This Must Be the Place and played Nurse Lucy Elkins in Steven Soderbergh's TV series The Knick.
- Oscar Isaac (born 1979), film and stage actor.
- David Karp (born 1986) – creator of Tumblr
- Louis Kestenbaum, real estate developer, founder and chairman of New York City-based Fortis Property Group
- Zoë Kravitz (born 1988) – actress and daughter of Lenny Kravitz
- Solly Krieger (1909–1964) – boxer
- James Lafferty (born 1985) – actor, director and producer known for role as Nathan Scott on One Tree Hill
- Leonard Lopate (1940-2025) – public radio talk show host.
- Sid Luckman (1916–1998), NFL Hall of Fame football player
- Barry Manilow (born 1943) – songwriter and performer
- Bettina May (born 1979) – pin-up model and photographer
- Henry Miller (1891–1980) – novelist
- Keith Murray – singer from the band We Are Scientists
- Richie Narvaez (born 1965) – author of Hipster Death Rattle (born in Williamsburg)
- Man Ray – artist
- Buddy Rich (1917–1987) – drummer
- Frankie Rose (born 1979) – musician
- Winona Ryder – actress
- Mikheil Saakashvili – former president of Georgia, exiled in the U.S.
- Semi Precious Weapons, including Justin Tranter – glam rock band and their frontman
- Benjamin "Bugsy" Siegel – notable gangster who shaped up the Las Vegas strip (born in Williamsburg)
- Richard Sheirer – director of the New York City Office of Emergency Management (O.E.M.) during the September 11th attacks.
- Gene Simmons – member of band Kiss
- Betty Smith (1896–1972), author best known for her 1943 novel A Tree Grows in Brooklyn.
- Abby Stein (born 1991), transgender activist, writer, and theorist who was born and raised in Williamsburg
- Jerry Stiller (1927–2020), comedian and actor
- Stuart Subotnick (born 1942), businessman and media magnate, among America's 500 wealthiest people and on The World's Billionaires list
- Alex Turner (born 1986) English musician and member of Arctic Monkeys
- Michael K. Williams (1966–2021), film and television actor, notable for his roles in The Wire and Boardwalk Empire
- Anthony E. Wills (1879–1912), playwright, novelist, author of short stories, and theatrical producer
- Anna Wood (born 1985), actress

=== Haredi rabbis ===
- Zecharia Dershowitz (1859–1921), founder of one of the first Yiddish communities in America, and the first Hasidic synagogue in Williamsburg
- Yom-Tov Ehrlich (1914–1990), renowned Hasidic musician, composer, lyricist, recording artist, and popular entertainer known for his popular Yiddish music albums. One of his most popular songs is "Williamsburg", a song about Hasidic Williamsburg during the 1950s.
- Chaim Avraham Dov Ber Levine HaCohen (1859/1860 – 1938), known as "the Malach" (lit., "the angel"), founder of the Malachim (Hasidic group)
- Yosef Greenwald (1903–1984), second Grand Rebbe of the Pupa Hasidic dynasty; supported the making of Eruvin in his hometown
- Yaakov Yechezkia Greenwald II (born 1948), present Grand Rebbe of the Pupa Hasidic sect, son of Rabbi Yosef
- Mordechai Hager (1922–2018), founder and Admor of the Vizhnitz Hasidic sect of Monsey for 46 years
- Yekusiel Yehudah Halberstam (1905–1994), founding Rebbe of the Sanz-Klausenburg Hasidic dynasty
- Fishel Hershkowitz (1922–2017), the Haleiner Rav, the senior Klausenburger dayan in Williamsburg, and respected elder in the American ultra-Orthodox community
- Dovid Leibowitz (1889–1941), founder and first rosh yeshiva of the Rabbinical Seminary of America, known today as "Yeshivas Chofetz Chaim", in Williamsburg
- Shraga Feivel Mendlowitz (1886–1948), founder of Torah Vodaath and Torah U'Mesorah
- Eliezer Zusia Portugal (1898–1982), the first Skulener Rebbe
- Yisrael Spira (1889–1989), Bluzhover Rebbe, senior member of Moetzes Gedolei HaTorah
- Yonasan Steif (1877–1958), rabbi of Kehal Adas Yereim in Williamsburg, founded by New York Orthodox Jews who came from Vienna; known as the "Wiener Rov"
- Joel Teitelbaum (1887–1979), founder and first Grand Rebbe of the Satmar Hasidic dynasty
- Moshe Teitelbaum (1914–2006), Hasidic rebbe and the world leader of the Satmar Hasidim after succeeding his uncle in 1980
- Aaron Teitelbaum (born 1947), one of two Grand Rebbes of Satmar, and the oldest son of Moshe Teitelbaum, Grand Rabbi of kiryas Joel, New York and Palm Tree, New York
- Zalman Leib Teitelbaum (born 1951), one of two Grand Rebbes of Satmar, and the third son of Moshe Teitelbaum, Grand Rabbi of Congregation Yetev Lev D'Satmar (Rodney Street, Brooklyn)
- Yakov Yosef Twersky (1899–1968), Grand Rebbe of the Skver Hasidic dynasty

== In popular culture ==
Literature

- The first three novels by Daniel Fuchs — Summer in Williamsburg (1934), Homage to Blenholt (1936), and Low Company (1937), collectively known as "The Williamsburg Trilogy" or "The Brooklyn Novels" — are set primarily in Williamsburg or its immediate vicinity.
- The 1943 novel A Tree Grows in Brooklyn takes place in Williamsburg in the 1910s.
- The 1967 book The Chosen, by Chaim Potok, is set in 1940s Williamsburg. The book was made into a film in 1981.
- The 2019 novel Hipster Death Rattle, by Richie Narvaez, takes place in a heavily gentrified Williamsburg.

Film, television, and theater

- Once Upon a Time in America (1984) begins in Williamsburg, and includes scenes shot in Williamsburg, though the focus of the story was Manhattan's Lower East Side in the 1920s, 1930s, and 1960s.
- The 1988 movie Coming to America was primarily filmed on South 5th Street in Williamsburg, despite being set in Queens.
- In the 1994 comedy-drama The Paper, directed by Ron Howard, Williamsburg became the setting for the scene of a fictional double murder that turns out to be a mafia retaliation killing.
- The episode "Walk Like a Man" of The Sopranos, aired 2007, features a scene shot in Williamsburg.
- The sitcom 2 Broke Girls (2011–2017) is set in Williamsburg.
- A large part of the TV series Younger was filmed in Williamsburg.
- Parts of Daredevil were filmed in Williamsburg, Greenpoint, and Bushwick, all passing for Hell's Kitchen, Manhattan.
- Parts of "How to Be Single, was filmed in Williamsburg next to the Williamsburg Bridge How to Be Single Film Locations, www.onthesetofnewyork.com
- "Keanu Reeves wields big gun while filming 'John Wick' in Brooklyn". New York Daily News. December 20, 2013. The last parts of "John Wick, was filmed in Williamsburg near and inside the Williamsburg Savings Bank

Music

- New Jersey emo band Armor for Sleep's third album, Smile for Them, featured the single "Williamsburg", which mocks the hipsters that call the neighborhood home.
- Kany García filmed her music video for her song "Feliz" in Williamsburg.

Photography

- Thomas Hoepker's photograph View from Williamsburg, Brooklyn, on Manhattan, 9/11 showing five people sitting on the banks of the East River while in the background a large cloud of smoke emanates from the collapsed towers of the World Trade Center was taken near the Williamsburg Bridge.

== See also ==
- KCDC (skateshop)
- List of Brooklyn neighborhoods
- List of former municipalities in New York City
- National Register of Historic Places listings in Brooklyn
- Opportunities for a Better Tomorrow
