= Eliakim (name) =

Eliakim, Elyakim, Eliaquim (Hebrew: אֶלְיָקִים) is a Jewish given name or a surname. Notable people with the name include:

== Biblical name ==
- Eliakim, son of Abiud
- Eliakim, son of Hilkiah
- Eliakim, son of Melea, an ancestor of Saint Joseph
- Jehoiakim, who was born Eliakim

== Given name ==
- Eliakim Araújo, Brazilian journalist
- Eliakim Awonongbadje, Canadian soccer player
- Elyakim Badian, Israeli politician
- Eliakim Carmoly, French rabbi
- Eliakim Coulibaly (born 2002), Ivorian tennis player
- Eliakim Doolittle (1772–1850), American composer and teacher
- Elyakim Haetzni (1926–2022), Israeli politician and lawyer
- Elyakim Kislev, Israeli sociologist, author and scholar
- Eliakim Khumalo, South African soccer player
- Eliakim Koenigsberg, American Orthodox rabbi and rosh yeshiva at Yeshiva University
- Eliakim Littell (1797–1870), American editor & publisher
- Eliaquim Mangala (born 1991), French footballer
- Eliakim ben Meshullam, German rabbi
- Eliakim ha-Milzahgi, Polish-born Talmudist
- Eliakim H. Moore, American politician
- E. H. Moore (1862–1932), American mathematician
- Elyakim Rosenblatt, Orthodox-Jewish rabbi
- Elyakim Rubinstein, Israeli Supreme Court judge
- Eliakim P. Scammon (1816–1894), Union Army general
- Elyakim Schlesinger (1921–2026), British Orthodox rabbi
- Eliakim Sherrill (1813–1863), American politician
- Elyakim Simon Djalil (born 1949), Indonesian politician
- Eliakim Stark, Israeli politician
- Eliakim Tupper, Canadian politician
- Kim Uasi, Tonga international rugby league footballer
- E. P. Walton (1812–1890), American politician, journalist and editor
- John E. Weeks (1853–1949), American politician
- Benjamin Eliakim Yates
- Eliakum Zunser (1840–1913), Lithuanian Yiddish writer

== Surname ==
- Daniel Elyakim (born 1953), Israeli chess player
- Sammy Elyakim, Israeli footballer

== Patronymic ==
- Hillel ben Eliakim, 11th/12th-century Greek rabbi and Talmud scholar

== See also ==
- Eliyahu
- Elkayam
