= Yeshivas Chofetz Chaim =

Orthodox yeshiva based in Queens, New York

Coordinates: 40°43′23″N 73°49′2.03″W

Yeshiva Chofetz Chaim

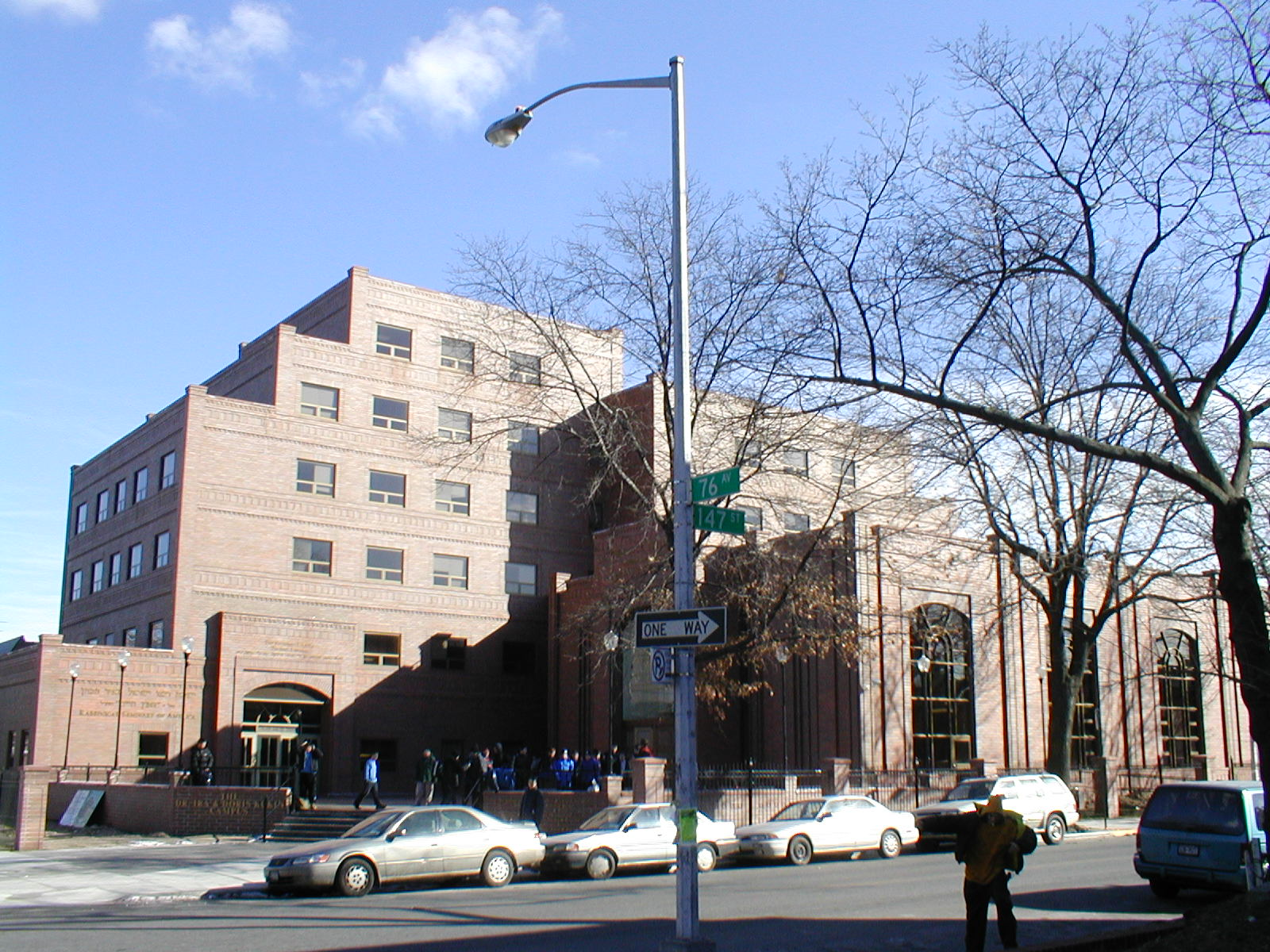

Location
- 76-01 147th St; Kew Gardens Hills, Queens, New York; United States

Information
- Type: Private elementary, middle school, high school, and beis medrash
- Established: 1933
- Founder: Rabbi Dovid Leibowitz
- Principal: Rabbi Dovid Harris, Rabbi Akiva Grunblatt
- Enrollment: ~450

Yeshivas Chofetz Chaim (also known as the Rabbinical Seminary of America) is an Orthodox yeshiva based in Kew Gardens Hills, Queens, New York, United States. It is primarily an American, non-chasidic Haredi Talmudic yeshiva. The yeshiva is legally titled Rabbinical Seminary of America (RSA) but is often referred to as just Chofetz Chaim as that was the nickname of its namesake, Yisroel Meir Kagan. It has affiliate branches in Israel and North America.

== History ==
=== Brooklyn ===
The Yeshiva was established in 1933 by Rabbi Dovid Leibowitz, a great-nephew of the Chofetz Chaim. Leibowitz was a disciple of Nosson Tzvi Finkel and he also studied under Naftoli Trop at the Yeshiva in Radun, Belarus.

The yeshiva was named for Leibowitz's great uncle, Rabbi Yisroel Meir Kagan, who had died that year. It is officially named Yeshivas Rabbeinu Yisrael Meir HaKohen, but is often referred to simply as Chofetz Chaim (Hebrew: חָפֵץ חַיִּים), which is commonly used as a name for Kagan, after his book with the same title. Chofetz Chaim means "desires life" in Hebrew.

The Yeshiva's first building was in Williamsburg, Brooklyn.

=== Queens ===
In December 1955 it relocated to Forest Hills, Queens. Most recently, in the summer of 2002, the Yeshiva relocated to Kew Gardens Hills, Queens.

=== Leadership ===
After Leibowitz died in December 1941, he was succeeded as head by his son, Henoch Leibowitz, a role held in the 21st century by Rabbi Dovid Harris, Rabbi Akiva Grunblatt, and Rabbi Shaul Opoczynski.

The yeshiva houses a boys' secondary school or Mesivta, Yeshiva Preparatory High School, headed for many years by Rabbi Zechariah Fendel, an undergraduate yeshiva, and a rabbinical school that grants Semicha (ordination). Rabbinical students at the yeshiva often spend a decade or more there, studying a traditional yeshiva curriculum focusing on Talmud, mussar ("ethics"), and halakha ("Jewish law").

== Characteristics ==
The yeshiva is known for six primary characteristics that distinguish it from other schools:

1. It places an emphasis on unpacking the latent processes of reasoning within the steps of the Talmudic sugya (section of text) being studied. It understands that the initial assumptions of the Talmud must have already been made after a highly rigorous process and therefore that the progression from that initial thought process (known as the hava aminah) to the final conclusion (known as the maskana) must be fully unfolded and understood.
2. It emphasizes rigor in its approach to ethical and Biblical texts and commentaries with the idea that a deduction from these texts should ideally be "logically and textually compelling."
3. It places a strong emphasis on the study of Mussar ("ethics"), both by attending and reviewing bi-weekly lectures and through daily individual study. This emphasis began with Dovid Leibowitz, who founded the yeshiva based on the doctrine of his rebbe, the Alter of Slabodka, and Rabbi Yisroel Salanter, the founder of the Mussar movement. The head of the yeshiva, Henoch Leibowitz would continually remind his students that as important as it is to become a lamdan ("analytical scholar") and a great pedagogue, it is even more important to become a mentch ("a good human being").
4. It places a premium upon involvement in Jewish education and on the propagation of the ideals and values of Judaism amongst the greater Jewish population. Upon completion of a rigorous term of study, students are encouraged to seek employment, and they have built institutions, such as schools and synagogues, in communities like Orlando, Florida and Henderson, Nevada that are distant from the major Jewish communal centers in the United States.
5. The yeshiva is very committed to its students’ subordination to "Daas Torah," as the introduction to the six-volume collection of Henoch Lebowitz's mussar lectures, "Chidushei Halev," deleniates. It subscribes to the belief that all things are in some way included within the Torah and perforce, one who has spent years dedicated to in-depth study of the Torah is able to appropriately apply its logic to all plausible situations.
6. It has adopted a philosophy that views as external factors as being of far less significance to internal factors, i.e. an individual should actually work on internal growth rather than on appearances.

== Affiliates and branches by location ==
The network of affiliated schools was selectively built over many decades by Henoch, including, in 1964, the first Israeli branch.

=== United States ===
- Arizona:
  - The Tucson Torah Center, Tucson
- California:
  - Valley Torah High School, Los Angeles
  - Torah High Schools of San Diego, San Diego
  - Yeshivas Ner Aryeh
  - Yeshivas Ohev Shalom, Los Angeles
  - Chofetz Chaim of Los Angeles, Los Angeles
  - Yeshiva Ketana of Los Angeles
- Florida:
  - Yeshiva Toras Chaim Toras Emes, North Miami Beach- Rabbi Binyomin Luban, Rosh Yeshiva
  - JEC of South Florida, Boca Raton, Florida
  - Torah Academy of Boca Raton
  - Yeshiva Tiferes Torah of Boca Raton
  - Orlando Torah Academy, Orlando, Florida
  - Sarasota Jewish Center Sarasota, Florida
- Illinois:
  - Torah Academy of Buffalo Grove (day school)
  - Suburban Alliance for Jewish Education (outreach organization)
  - Jewish Family Interactive Experience Hebrew School
- Kentucky
  - Montessori Torah Academy, Louisville, KY
- Missouri:
  - Missouri Torah Institute, St. Louis
- New Jersey:
  - Foxman Torah Institute, Cherry Hill serving the Greater Philadelphia region
- Nevada:
  - Ahavas Torah Center
  - Las Vegas Kollel
  - Mesivta of Las Vegas
  - Yeshiva Day School of Las Vegas
- New York:
  - Huntington
  - Yeshiva Derech Hatorah, Monsey
  - Yeshiva Tiferes Yisroel, Brooklyn
  - Mesivta Tiferes Yisroel, Brooklyn
  - Kew Gardens Hills, Queens (main school, described in this article)
  - Yeshiva Zichron Paltiel, Staten Island (moving to Passaic, New Jersey after the Summer)
  - Talmudical Institute of Upstate New York, Rochester
  - Yeshiva Zichron Aryeh, Bayswater (Far Rockaway)
  - Yeshiva Kol Torah, Inwood (Five Towns & Far Rockaway)
  - Mesivta Tiferet Torah, Kew Gardens
  - Yeshivas Ma'ayan Hatorah, NY, Kew Gardens Hills
- Ohio:
  - Yeshiva of Cleveland, Cleveland Heights, Ohio
- Texas:
  - Texas Torah Institute, Dallas
- Wisconsin:
  - Wisconsin Institute for Torah Study, Milwaukee
- Washington:
  - Torah Academy of the Pacific Northwest, Seattle, Washington

=== Canada ===
- British Columbia:
  - Pacific Torah Institute, Vancouver, British Columbia (Moved to Las Vegas, 2019)
- Ontario:
  - Ottawa Torah Institute, Ottawa, Ontario

=== Israel ===
- Jerusalem area
  - Chofetz Chaim Jerusalem, located in the Sanhedria Murhevet neighbourhood
  - Zichron Aryeh Yerushalayim
  - Ramat Beit Shemesh - Yeshivas Nachalas Yisroel Yitzchok

== Notable alumni ==
- Baruch Chait, composer and Rosh Yeshiva of Maarava in Moshav Matisyahu, Israel
- Dovid Harris, co-Rosh Yeshiva (dean) at the Yeshivas Rabbeinu Yisrael Meir HaKohen
- Shlomo Levinger, magician
- Binyomin Luban, Rosh Yeshiva of Yeshiva Toras Chaim in Miami
- Elyakim Rosenblatt, Rosh Yeshiva of Yeshiva Kesser Torah
- Abie Rotenberg, musician and composer
- Solomon Sharfman, former rabbi of the Young Israel of Flatbush
