= Mendel Zaks =

Lithuanian–American Orthodox rabbi and professor (1898–1974)

Rabbi Menachem Mendel Yosef Zaks

Personal life
- Born: 1898 Šiluva, Kovno Governorate, Russian Empire (now Lithuania)
- Died: 1974 (aged 75–76) Jerusalem
- Spouse: Rebbetzin Feiga Chaya Zaks (née Kagan)
- Parent: Yaakov Mordechai Zaks (father)
- Education: Raduń Yeshiva; Yeshiva Knesses Beis Yitzchok

Religious life
- Religion: Judaism
- Denomination: Orthodox Judaism

Jewish leader
- Predecessor: Rabbi Naftoli Trop
- Successor: Rabbi Gershon Zaks; Rabbi Hillel Zaks
- Position: Rosh yeshiva
- Yeshiva: Raduń Yeshiva; Rabbi Isaac Elchanan Theological Seminary
- Yahrtzeit: 19 Tevet

Menachem Mendel Yosef Zaks (Hebrew: מענדיל זאקס; 1898–1974), commonly known as Rabbi Mendel Zaks, was a prominent Lithuanian–Jewish Orthodox rabbi and professor in Byelorussia, Poland, and the United States, best known for being the professor of Talmudic studies (rosh yeshiva) at the Raduń Yeshiva, and being the son-in-law to Yisrael Meir Kagan, the Chofetz Chaim.

== Early life ==
Zaks was born in Šiluva, Rossiyensky Uyezd, Kovno Governorate, in the Russian Empire (today in Lithuania). Before joining the Raduń Yeshiva, Nowogródek Voivodeship, in Poland, he studied in the Yeshiva Knesses Beis Yitzchok while it was still in Słabódka, before it moved to Kaminetz. He was forced to leave Raduń during World War I and then studied under Reuven Dov Dessler. He also studied under Meir Simcha of Dvinsk, whose Meshech Chochmah he had helped to print.

After the war, Zaks returned to teaching in the Raduń Yeshiva, where he studied with his future father-in-law; in 1922, he married Feiga Chaya, Kagan's youngest daughter (who was 64 at the time of her birth). By doing so, he joined Kagan as leader of the yeshiva and in all other communal affairs. Zaks was immediately recognized for his teaching and leadership abilities. In 1925, Zaks propagated the yeshiva curriculum among the Litvish Orthodox Jewish communities living in the United States in an effort to raise money there for the operation of the yeshiva and its charities. His vast knowledge of Jewish law and Talmudic literature, coupled with a photographic memory and unending hours spent with his students, attracted even more students to the Raduń Yeshiva at that time.

== Teaching career ==
Upon the death of Naftoli Trop in 1928, Zaks was appointed rosh yeshiva to the Raduń Yeshiva, Nowogródek Voivodeship, in Poland. The outbreak of World War II forced the yeshiva to transfer to Vilna, Lithuania, and eventually Zaks re-established the yeshiva in 1943 at New York City, where he had moved with his family in 1941. In 1946, he accepted the position of rosh yeshiva and bochen (examiner) at the Rabbi Isaac Elchanan Theological Seminary, the rabbinical seminary of Yeshiva University (YU). Following his retirement, he died in Jerusalem in 1974.

Reportedly, Zaks had an extraordinary memory and was an expert in the Talmud and its commentaries. Legend has it that Zaks edited the final version of the Mishnah Berurah in his office, located in the MTA building. His sons, Gershon Zaks and Hillel Zaks (rabbi in Kiryat Sefer and rosh yeshiva in Yeshivas Knesses Hagedolah, respectively), died in 1989 and 2015. His daughter, Rivka Wiesenfeld, died in 2008.
