= Baruch Chait =

Israeli musical artist

Rabbi Baruch Chait ברוך חייט
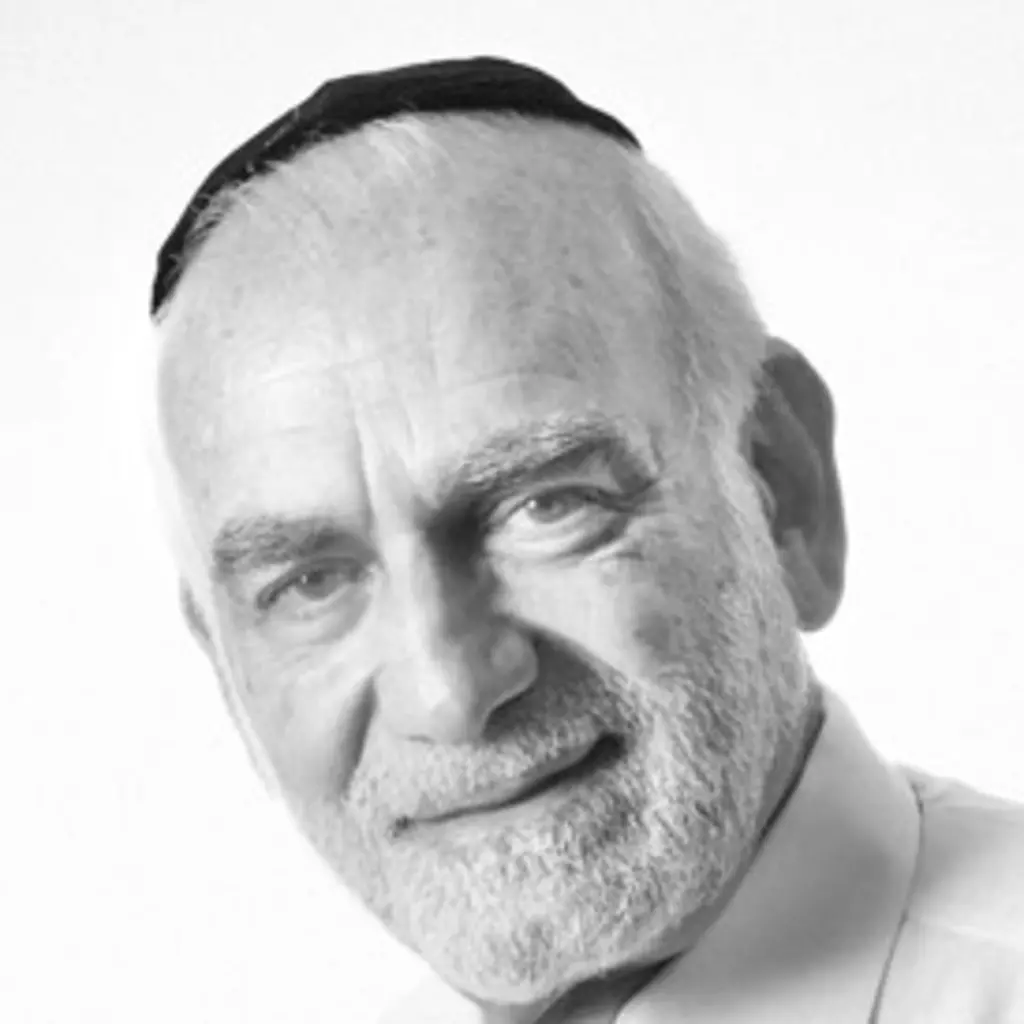

Background information
- Also known as: Burry
- Born: 1946 (age 79–80)
- Genres: Folk; Jewish
- Occupations: Rosh yeshiva; musician; author
- Instrument: Guitar
- Years active: 1967 – present
- Formerly of: The Rabbis' Sons

Baruch "Burry" Chait (Hebrew: ברוך "בורי" חייט; born 1946) is an Orthodox Jewish rabbi, musician and composer. He is rosh yeshiva of the Israeli high school Maarava Machon Rubin in Matityahu.

== Early life ==
Baruch Chait was born to Esther and Moshe Chait, a rabbi and future rosh yeshiva (dean) of Yeshivath Chafetz Chaim of Jerusalem. He studied under Henoch Leibowitz, rosh yeshiva of Yeshiva Chofetz Chaim of Forest Hills, New York. As a youth counselor, Chait was involved with various summer camps in New York's Catskill Mountains, including Torah Vodaas, Camp Munk and Sdei Chemed. There, he learned to use music as an alternative means to educational growth.

== Career ==
=== Music ===
Having been influenced by Shlomo Carlebach, at the age of 16 or 17 Chait began composing Jewish religious melodies. Later, in 1975, Chait would go on to collaborate with Carlebach and Abie Rotenberg on an album, Ani Maamin (lit. 'I Believe').

In 1967, Chait co-founded a band called The Rabbis' Sons along with Label Sharfman, Itzy Weinberger and Michael Zheutlin—all of the bandmates except Zheutlin being sons of rabbis. The band's debut album, Hal'lu, featured some of Chait's first compositions, including Rabos Machshovos (lit. 'Many Are The Thoughts') and Mi Ho-ish (lit. 'Who Is The Man'), which he adapted from The Book of Psalms. The progressive sound that the band produced received a somewhat lukewarm response from Leibowitz due to its folk roots (the band's instruments consisted mostly of guitars, a relatively new innovation for Jewish music of the time) but Chait's father approved. Chait later founded Kol Salonika. He has since composed hundreds of Jewish religious songs that have wide popularity and appeal, publishing dozens of records. He wrote Kol Ha'Olam Kulo while performing for Israel Defense Forces soldiers during the Yom Kippur War. The song quickly became an Israeli standard, having been covered by Ofra Haza. On February 27, 2022, Chait was inducted with the inaugural class of the Jewish Music Hall of Fame.

=== Education ===
In 1987, Chait founded Maarava Machon Rubin, a yeshiva high school in Matityahu, West Bank. The school combines religious and secular studies at a level allowing completion of matriculation exams. The school caters to the Haredi sector, and this fact initially brought Chait, who described himself as a "small man", into conflict with ostensibly greater Haredi leaders who normally oppose such innovation in Jewish education. However, he has since secured the private blessing of a number of leading rabbis in this endeavour.

=== Writing ===
Chait has written a number of children's educational books on Jewish topics, together with illustrators Gadi Pollack and Yoni Gerstein. Many of his books go under the name of the HaLamdan HaKattan (small scholar) series.

Some of his books include:

- The 39 Avoth Melacha of Shabbath
- The Ehrenhaus Middos Series:
  - The Incredible Voyage to Good Middos
  - The Lost Treasure of Tikun Hamiddos Island
  - The Terrifying Trap of the Bad Middos Pirates
  - Shadow Pirates — The Wheel Is in Your Hands (2022)
- The Katz Haggadah : The Art of Faith and Redemption
- My Friends - The Alef Beis
- Torah Town
- The Desert Diary: The Historic Journey of a Nation with Divine Faith Through a Wilderness to the Promised Land
- Ha'achadim Ve'ha'asafim (Hebrew)

== Personal life ==
Chait is a resident of the Har Nof neighbourhood of Jerusalem.
