= YOC =

YOC or Yoc may refer to:

- Antioch, California, US (slang: Yoc)
- Yeshiva of Cleveland, Ohio, US
- Young Ornithologists' Club, UK
- Old Crow Airport, Canada (IATA:YOC)
