= Elkaïm =

Elkaïm or Elkaim are French-language transcriptions of the North African Jewish surname Elkayam. Notable people with the surname include:

- Arlette Elkaïm-Sartre (1935–2016), French philosopher
- Gilles Elkaim (born 1960), Frenct physicist, explorer, photographer, filmmaker, and writer of adventure books
- Jérémie Elkaïm (born 1978), French actor, screenwriter and film director
- Mony Elkaïm (1941–2020), Moroccan-Belgian psychiatrist and psychotherapist
- Olivia Elkaim (born 1976), French journqalist and writer
