= Solomon Sharfman =

Solomon J. Sharfman
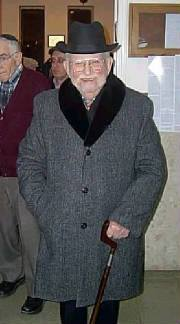
- Born: November 1, 1915; Treblinka, Poland
- Died: December 4, 2004 (aged 89); Jerusalem, Israel
- Resting place: Eretz HaChaim cemetery, Beit Shemesh, Israel
- Other names: Rabbi Sharfman
- Occupation: Rabbi
- Employer: Young Israel of Flatbush
- Spouse: Libby Ossip
- Children: Label Sharfman; Debbi Diament; Rochelle Kohn; Lea Hain; Riki Koenigsberg
- Parent(s): Aharon Leib and Fruma Sharfman

Solomon Sharfman was a rabbi of Orthodox Jewry who built the Flatbush Modern Orthodox Jewish community in the mid-1900s.

== Life ==
Solomon Joseph Sharfman was born on November 1, 1915, in Treblinka, Poland; his family came to the United States five years later. His father, Rabbi Label Sharfman, worked as a shochet in Newark, New Jersey. He attended Yeshivas Chofetz Chaim and reportedly made up the name "The Rabbinical Seminary of America" when registering the new institution with the City of New York, because the city did not want to accept a Hebrew name.

For over forty years, from 1938 to 1984, Sharfman was the rabbi of Young Israel of Flatbush, the pulpit from which he led American Jewry. For two years, from 1956 to 1958, he served as president of the Rabbinical Council of America, and from 1969 to 1971, he was president of the Synagogue Council of America.

Rabbi Sharfman maintained a relationship with rabbinic luminaries of the era, such as Rabbi Joseph B. Soloveitchik and Rabbi Moshe Feinstein.

His writings are included in a number of compilations of rabbinic literature ("Homer LeDerush") of the National Council of Young Israel. He died in his sleep on December 19, 2004.

== Legacy ==
=== Communal ===
Rabbi Sharfman was an early (1950s) opponent to New York's Sunday Blue laws.

In 1989 he helped focus the attention of the National Council of Young Israel on JustOneLife, an organization that provides professional counseling and financial assistance, enabling and empowering mothers to choose to continue their pregnancies to term. As of 2017 the organization is still in operation.

=== Personal ===
He was survived by his wife and their sons and daughters, along with many grandchildren and greatgrandchildren.

His son, Rabbi Label Sharfman, founded and heads the Bnot Torah Seminary in the Sanhedria Murhevet neighborhood in Jerusalem, otherwise known as "Sharfman's". Notable grandchildren include Rabbi Eliakim Koenigsberg, Rosh Yeshiva at Yeshivat R' Yitzchak Elchanan (RIETS). A sister of Rabbi Koenigsberg is married to Rabbi Meir Orlian, who is the rabbi and Dayan of a synagogue in Yad Binyamin and teaches in Yeshivat Shaalvim and Kerem BeYavneh. Another sister, Dr. Chani (née Koenigsberg) Maybruch EdD, MA, is a relationship educator and coach along with her husband Rabbi Shmuel Maybruch. His youngest grandson is R' David Diament, honorary lecturer at The 2018 Dr. Abraham S. and Phyllis Weissman Memorial Rabbinic Lecture in RIETS.
