= Eliakim (disambiguation) =

Eliakim is a moshav in Israel.

Eliakim or Elyakim may also refer to:

- Eliakim (name)
- Tropical Storm Eliakim
