= Dovid Leibowitz =

Lithuanian rabbi

Rabbi Chaim Dovid Hakohen Leibowitz
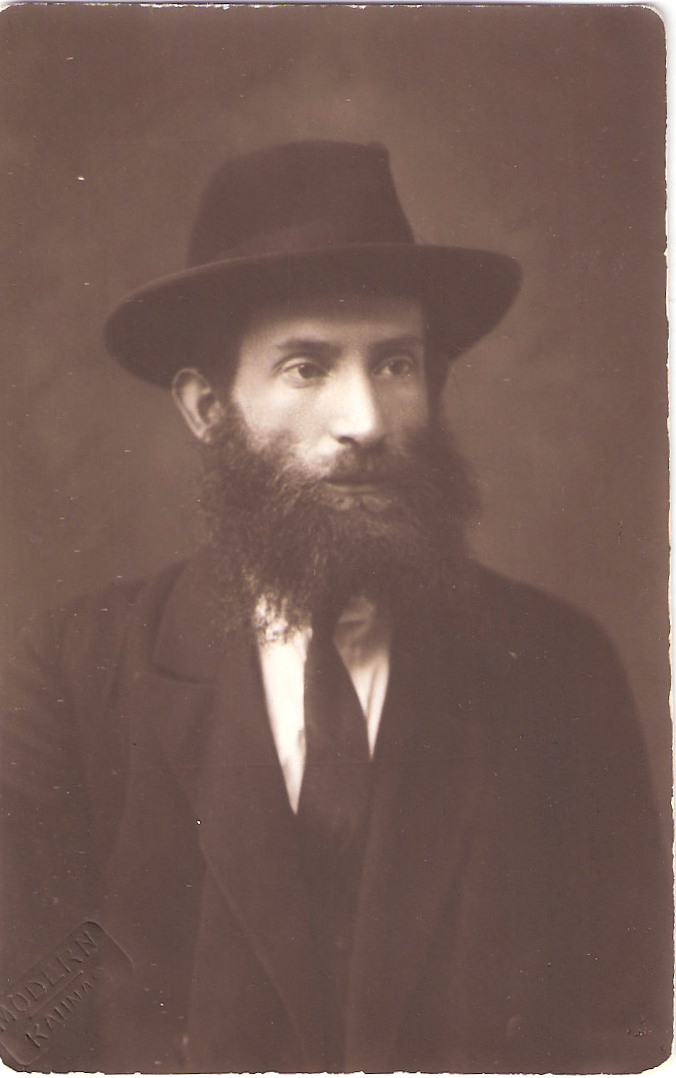

Personal life
- Born: May 15, 1887 Vilnius, Russian Empire (present-day Lithuania)
- Died: December 4, 1941 (aged 54) New York
- Children: Henoch Leibowitz
- Education: Yeshivas Knesses Yisrael (Slabodka)

Religious life
- Religion: Judaism

Jewish leader
- Successor: Henoch Leibowitz
- Position: Rosh yeshiva (dean)
- Organisation: Yeshivas Chofetz Chaim
- Began: 1933
- Ended: December 4, 1941

Dovid Leibowitz (May 15, 1887 – December 4, 1941) was a Russian-born American rabbi. A disciple of Slabodka yeshiva in Lithuania, he went on to found Yeshivas Chofetz Chaim in the United States, where he served as rosh yeshiva (dean).

== Early life ==
As a teenager Leibowitz studied in the Radin Yeshiva, where he held private study sessions with his great-uncle and founder of the yeshiva—Yisrael Meir Kagan—helping him to write the last volume of his Mishnah Berurah. He also studied there under Naftoli Trop. In 1908 Leibowitz transferred to the Slabodka yeshiva, where he studied under Nosson Tzvi Finkel. In 1915 Leibowitz succeeded his father-in-law as rabbi of Šalčininkai. After six years he returned to Slabodka as a founding member of the Slabodka kollel.

== Career ==
In January 1927, Leibowitz went to the United States as a fund-raiser for the kollel, and was invited to become the first rosh yeshiva (dean) of Mesivta Torah Vodaath. Among his students were Gedalia Schorr and Avraham Yaakov Pam. In 1933, Leibowitz founded the Rabbinical Seminary of America (RSA) in the Williamsburg neighborhood of Brooklyn, New York. He did so after a dispute arose with Shraga Feivel Mendlowitz—head of Torah Vodaath—over the goals of Torah Vodaath, and consequent legal proceedings before a rabbinical court. Leibowitz served as RSA's first rosh yeshiva. The school, which later moved to Kew Gardens Hills, Queens is better known today as Yeshivas Chofetz Chaim, so named for Leibowitz's great-uncle, who was known as the "Chofetz Chaim".

== Death ==
Leibowitz died of a heart attack on Thursday December 4, 1941. His funeral was held on Sunday December 7, 1941. The yeshiva was headed for the following sixty-seven years by his only son, Henoch Leibowitz. Under Henoch Leibowitz's leadership, the school developed a network of affiliated institutions. By 2025, the Rabbinical Seminary of America reported that its network included 88 affiliates across the United States.
