= Hillel Zaks =

Rabbi Hillel Zaks הלל זקס

Personal life
- Born: Tu BiShvat, 5691, February 2, 1931 Radun, Poland
- Died: January 13, 2015 (aged 83) Bnei Brak, Israel
- Parent(s): Mendel Zaks; Faiga Chaya Kagan

Religious life
- Religion: Judaism

Jewish leader
- Successor: Rabbi Yitzchak Zev Zaks
- Yeshiva: Yeshivas Knesses Hagedolah
- Position: Rosh yeshiva

Hillel Zaks (Hebrew: הלל זקס; February 2, 1931 – January 13, 2015) was the founder and rosh yeshiva of Yeshivas Knesses Hagedolah in Kiryat Sefer.

He was the son of Mendel and Faiga Chaya Zaks, the youngest daughter of Israel Meir Kagan.

He served as one of Hebron Yeshiva's senior roshei yeshiva until he founded Yeshivas Knesses Hagedolah in Kiryat Sefer.
