= Kook =

Kook or KOOK may refer to:

== People ==
- Kook (surname)
- Kook, a slave prominent in the 1811 German Coast Uprising
- Kook (surfer), a term for a wanna-be surfer of limited skill

== Media ==
- KYKK (FM), a radio station (93.5 FM) licensed to serve Junction, Texas, United States, which held the call sign KOOK from 1998 to 2018
- KOOK-TV, a television station now known as KTVQ
- Kook TV, a Saraiki language TV Channel from Pakistan
- Kooks, a 1988–1991 magazine and a 1994 book by Donna Kossy

== Entertainment ==
- KOOK (TV series), a hit music programme on BBC Persian TV
- The Kooks, formed 2004, a British band
- The Kooks (Sweden), a band formed in 1998
- K.O.O.K., an album by German rock band Tocotronic
- "Kooks" (song), a 1971 David Bowie song on Hunky Dory
- The Kook, a 2011 American short film

== See also ==
- Cuckoo (disambiguation)
