= The Rabbis' Sons =

Jewish music group

- "The Rabbis' Sons" as they appeared at the "Salute to Israel" - Rheingold Music Festival - Central Park New York on July 2, 1967

Background information
- Origin: New York, NY
- Genres: Jewish, Chassidic
- Years active: 1967-1996
- Labels: Fran Record Co., Emes Record Co., Perach Records
- Members: Baruch Chait, Label Sharfman, Itzy Weinberger, Michael Zheutlin

The Rabbis' Sons is a Jewish music group that released most of its albums between 1967 and 1974. It consisted of Rabbis Baruch Chait (main composer, guitar), Label Sharfman (vocals), Itzy Weinberger (vocals) and Michael Zheutlin (vocals, composer, guitar, piano, other instruments), with David Nulman on steel guitar and Mickey Lane on bass fiddle. The group got its name because Chait, Sharfman and Weinberger were all sons of rabbis.

Their musical style was influenced by Chassidic music, American folk music, and by the music of Shlomo Carlebach. Distinctive features of their sound were the presence of three-part harmonies and acoustic guitar playing in many of their songs. Lyrics were typically in Hebrew and derived from sections of zemiros, hallel and tefila. The music was composed primarily by Chait with some compositions by Zheutlin and others.

== History ==
Weinberger and Zheutlin were friends from their high school days at the Rabbi Jacob Joseph Yeshiva. They met Sharfman at Camp Morasha. The three of them enrolled at Yeshiva University and honed their singing talents there. In November 1966, Chait, a student at the Chofetz Chaim yeshiva, where Dovid Nulman and Barry Septimus were also students, heard the three in a performance at Yeshiva University. He sent them demo tapes containing some of his original compositions and asked them to record the songs. Eventually, in early 1967, the four of them created The Rabbis’ Sons and recorded their first album. One of their highlights of that year was to be invited to perform at the Salute to Israel – Rheingold Music Festival on July 2 in New York City's Central Park. It was a rally celebrating Israel's victory in the Six Day War.

The Rabbis' Sons released four albums in their heyday (see Discography). All four of the primary members were present on the first two albums (Chait to a lesser degree on the second album). Only Chait and Zheutlin were present on the third album and Weinberger rejoined the group for the fourth album. Among their most famous songs were Rabos Machshovos, Mi Ho-ish, Hal'lu, Tov Lehodos and Harachaman.

A compilation album was released in 1977.

== Aftermath ==
Baruch Chait would later form Kol Salonika and Label Sharfman would later form D'veykus. Itzy Weinberger also contributed vocals to some D'veykus songs. Additionally, D'veykus has recorded some tunes that were composed by Chait and by Zheutlin.

== Reunion ==
In 1991, all four of the original Rabbis' Sons reunited to perform a charity concert in Carnegie Hall for the Shorashim organization. In 1996, they released an album with all new material. In 2007 (after the passing of Michael Zheutlin in 2002), it was thought that The Rabbis' Sons would release another album but this has yet to come about.

== Discography ==
Date	Title	Format	Label	Producer
June 1967	Hal'lu	LP	Fran Record Co., Emes Record Co.	Baruch Chait, Barry Septimus
August 1968	To Life	LP	Emes Record Co.	Itzy Weinberger, Baruch Chait
June 1970	Shalom	LP	Emes Record Co.	
1974	The Rabbis Sing	LP	Emet Record Co.	
1977	Greatest Hits	LP, Cassette (later on CD)	Emes Record Co.	
1996	Kivinu	Cassette, CD	Perach Records	Yitz Grossman
