= Nefesh Mountain =

Jewish-bluegrass band

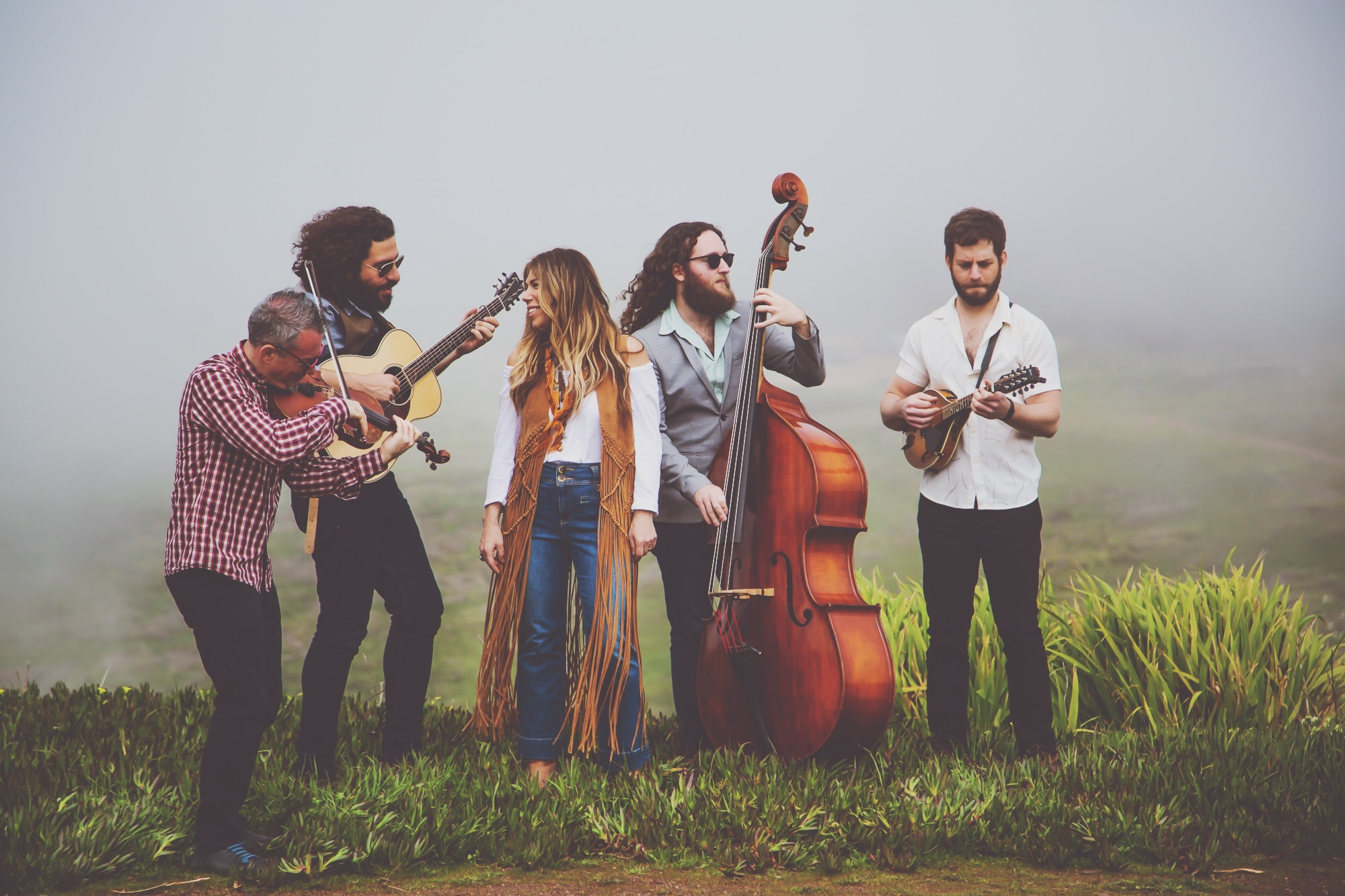
- Nefesh Mountain in Marin County California, 2019

Background information
- Origin: Montclair, New Jersey
- Genres: Bluegrass
- Years active: 2015-present
- Members: Doni Zasloff; Eric Lindberg; Alan Grubner; Erik Alvar
- Website: http://www.nefeshmountain.com/

Nefesh Mountain (Note: "Nefesh" is a term from the Hebrew Bible which can be loosely translated as 'soul'. See how the band explains its name.) is a New York based progressive bluegrass band that bridges elements of American folk and Appalachian bluegrass with Celtic folk and Jewish melodies. The band first emerged in 2015 with their eponymous debut Nefesh Mountain, followed by their second release Beneath The Open Sky featuring bluegrass veterans Sam Bush, Jerry Douglas, Tony Trischka and David Grier. Their most recent album Songs For The Sparrows was recorded at Sound Emporium Studios in Nashville, TN and features Sam Bush, Jerry Douglas, Bryan Sutton, John Doyle, and Mike McGoldrick among others. The band has also showcased for the International Bluegrass Music Association, Americana Music Association, and Folk Alliance International.

== History ==
Doni Zasloff grew up in Washington, DC and Philadelphia, and earned a degree in musical theater from Brandeis University. She began writing her own songs while teaching at her daughter's synagogue preschool, eventually forming the Mama Doni Band, which won the Simcha Award at the 2008 International Jewish Music Festival.

Eric Lindberg grew up in Brooklyn but often visited his father's family in Georgia, where he developed an appreciation for bluegrass music. He began playing guitar at the age of 10, inspired by blues musicians like Eric Clapton and Jimi Hendrix. He also cites Pat Metheny and Bela Fleck as influences on his work. He has a degree in jazz performance from Mason Gross School of the Arts at Rutgers University.

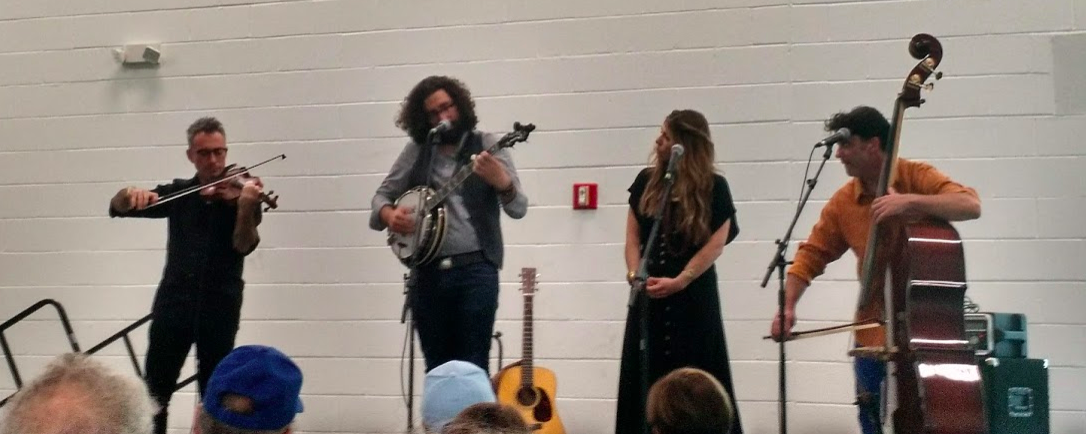
Nefesh Mountain performing in North Carolina, 2018

They recorded the album Beneath The Open Sky in Nashville, recording with veteran bluegrass musicians Sam Bush, Jerry Douglas, Tony Trischka, and David Grier. The song "Narrow Bridge" (based on a saying by Rabbi Nachman of Breslov) was inspired by the political climate after the 2016 presidential election. The music video was filmed in winter on a frozen lake at Woodstock in the Catskills.

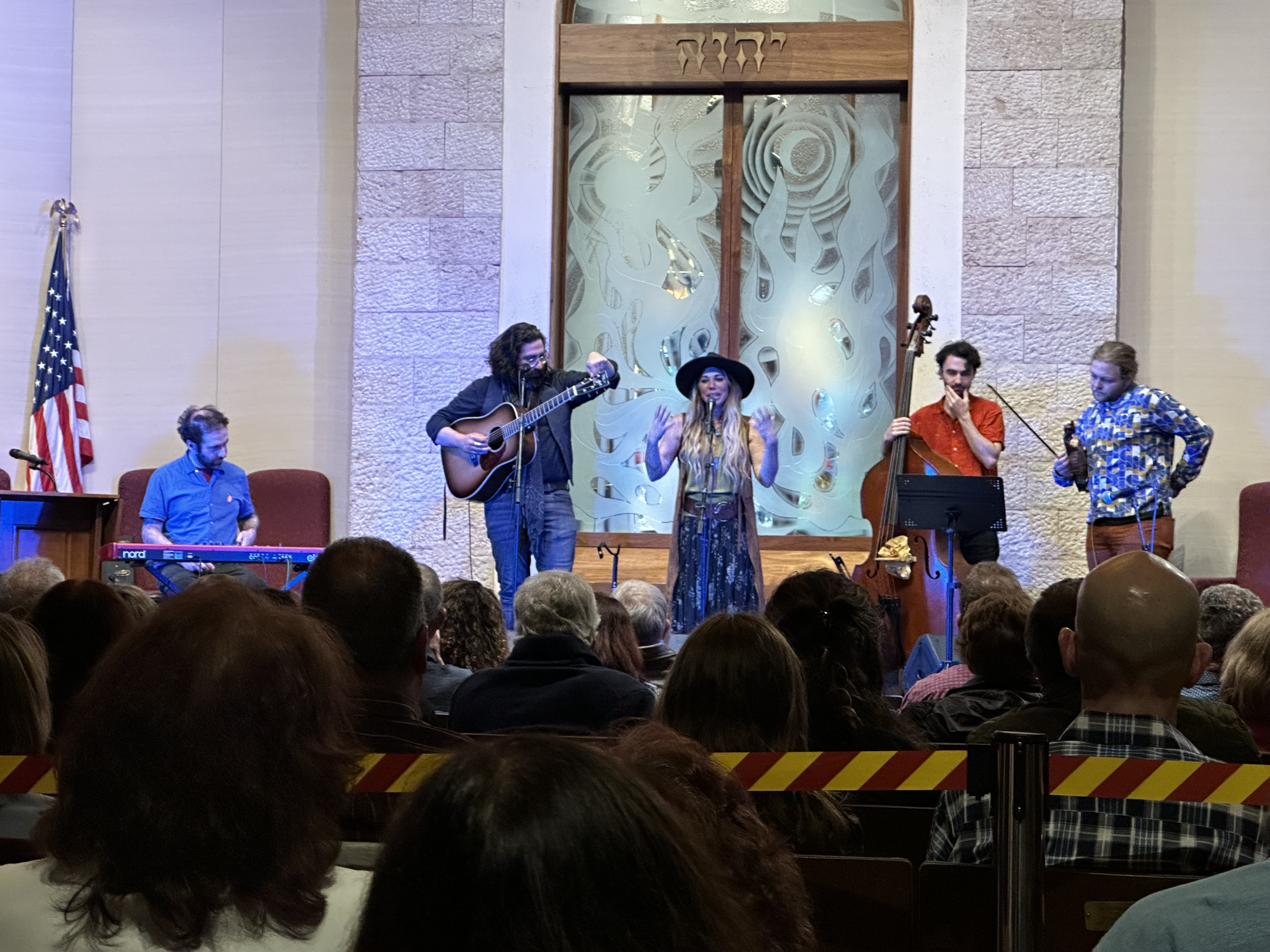
Nefesh Mountain performing in New Jersey, 2024

Their 2021 album Songs For The Sparrows was recorded at Sound Emporium Studios in Nashville and was inspired by a family roots to Eastern Europe trip that Lindberg and Zasloff took back in 2018. In an interview with Rolling Stone the couple detailed the trip which ignited a sense of pride in their heritage as Jewish Americans, leading to the songs on the album which they dedicate to their ancestors who passed in the Holocaust, as well as other marginalized groups who are discriminated against today.

== Members ==
- Doni Zasloff – vocals
- Eric Lindberg – vocals, guitar, banjo
- Alan Grubner – violin
- Erik Alvar – bass

== Discography ==
- Songs From The Mountain (Compilation)
- Nefesh Mountain (2016) - Featuring Sam Bush, Mark Schatz, Scott Vestal and Rob Ickes
- Beneath The Open Sky (2018) - Featuring Sam Bush, Jerry Douglas, Tony Trischka and David Grier
- Songs for the Sparrows (2021) - Featuring Sam Bush, Jerry Douglas and Bryan Sutton
- Live From Levon Helm Studios: A Hanukkah Holiday Concert (2021)
- The Cabin Sessions (2024)
- Beacons (2025)
