= Mattityahu =

Mattityahu is a Hebrew first name literally meaning "The gift of Yahweh". English renderings include Matthew, Matthias, and Mattathias. Mattithyahu is a variation.

Mattityahu may refer to:

== People ==
- Mattathias (died 165 BCE), Jewish priest also known as Mattityahu
- Mattityahu Peled (1923–1995), Israeli public figure
- Mattityahu Strashun (1817–1885), rabbi and scholar
- Matisyahu (born 1979), reggae musician
- Matisyahu Salomon, rabbi and public speaker

== Other uses ==
- Matityahu, Mateh Binyamin, an Israeli settlement in the West Bank
