= Yaakov Luban =

Rabbi Yaakov Luban is the rabbi of Congregation Ohr Torah in Edison, New Jersey, United States. He is also the Executive Rabbinic Coordinator at the Orthodox Union Kosher and is a member of the Va'ad HaRabbonim of Raritan Valley. He learned under Rabbi Chaim Shmuelevitz in the Mirrer Yeshiva in Jerusalem, Israel. He also learned in Talmudical Yeshiva of Philadelphia and in Beth Medrash Govoha(BMG). He received his rabbinic ordination in 1979 from Rabbi Shneur Kotler.

His brother, Rabbi Binyomin Luban is the rosh yeshiva in Yeshiva Chafetz Chaim of Florida.

== Articles by Rabbi Luban ==
- Mezonos Rolls
- Is Your Oven Kosher? What Every Kosher Cook Must Know
- Fraudulent Claims! How to be Your Own Detective
- Separating Terumah and Ma'aser
