= Henoch Leibowitz =

American rabbi (1918–2008)

Rabbi Alter Chanoch Henoch Hakohen Leibowitz
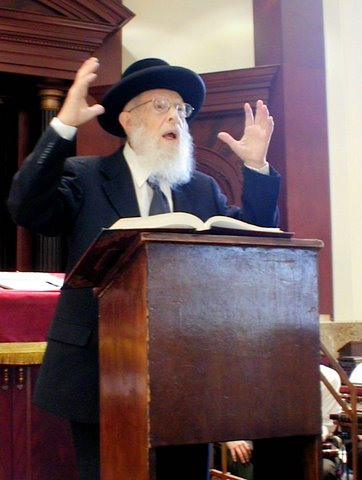
- Title: 2nd Rosh Yeshiva (Dean) of Yeshiva Chofetz Chaim: Rabbinical Seminary of America

Personal life
- Born: June 2, 1918 Šalčininkai, Lithuania
- Died: April 15, 2008 (aged 89) New York City, US
- Buried: Mount Judah Cemetery
- Parent: Chaim Dovid Hakohen Leibowitz

Religious life
- Religion: Judaism
- Denomination: Orthodox
- Profession: Rosh Yeshiva

Jewish leader
- Predecessor: Rabbi Chaim Dovid Hakohen Leibowitz
- Successor: Rabbi Dovid Harris and Rabbi Akiva Grunblatt
- Position: Rosh Yeshiva
- Yeshiva: Yeshivas Rabbeinu Yisrael Meir HaKohen
- Began: December 7, 1941
- Ended: April 15, 2008

Alter Chanoch Henoch Hakohen Leibowitz (June 2, 1918 – April 15, 2008) was an Orthodox rabbi who was Rosh Yeshiva (dean) of Yeshivas Rabbeinu Yisrael Meir HaKohen, which was founded by his father Rabbi Chaim Dovid Hakohen Leibowitz in 1933.

== Biography ==
Rabbi Leibowitz was born in 1918 in Šalčininkai, Lithuania, and was the only son of Dovid Leibowitz. He came to America in 1926 when his father was hired by Mesivta Torah Vodaath as a teacher. In 1933, his father left Torah Vodaath and founded Yeshivas Rabbeinu Yisrael Meir HaKohen. His father's death in 1941 left him in charge of the yeshiva in his early 20s. He built a network of Jewish educational institutions in the United States, Canada and Israel.

New York governor David Paterson reportedly called Leibowitz “the most honest person in the state of New York”.

== Notable students ==
His students include the following rabbis:

- Dovid Harris, rosh yeshiva (dean) of Yeshiva Chafetz Chaim
- Elyakim Rosenblatt, rebbi in Yeshiva Chafetz Chaim and later rosh yeshiva of Yeshiva Kesser Torah
- Menachem Davidowitz, rosh yeshiva of Talmudic Institute of Upstate New York
- Baruch Chait, rosh yeshiva of the Israeli high school Maarava Machon Rubin
- Daniel Glatstein, rabbi of Kehilas Tiferes Mordechai

== Sources ==
- Greenwald, Shlomo (April 18, 2008). "Rabbi Henoch Leibowitz, Rosh Yeshiva of Yeshiva Chofetz Chaim, dies". The Jewish Press. Archived from the original on February 18, 2020.
