= Elyakim Rosenblatt =

Orthodox-Jewish rabbi

Rabbi Elyakim Rosenblatt

Personal life
- Born: 1933 Brownsville, Brooklyn
- Died: March 27, 2019 (aged 85–86)
- Buried: Beth David Cemetery, Elmont, New York
- Spouse: Trani Rosenblatt
- Children: Batsheva Rothberg (née Roenblatt); Yaakov; Moshe
- Parent(s): Yechiel Michel; Sara
- Education: Beth Medrash Govoha; Yeshiva Chafetz Chaim

Religious life
- Religion: Judaism
- Denomination: Orthodox Judaism
- Yeshiva: Yeshiva Kesser Torah
- Position: Rosh yeshiva
- Main work: Ohr Lenisivasi
- Yahrtzeit: 20 Adar II, 5779
- Residence: Queens, New York
- Semikhah: Yoreh Yoreh; Yadin Yadin

Rabbi Elyakim Getzel Rosenblatt (1933 – March 27, 2019) was an American Orthodox rabbi. He was the founder and rosh yeshiva of Yeshiva Kesser Torah in Kew Gardens Hills, Queens.

== Early life ==
Rosenblatt was born in 1933 in the Brownsville section of Brooklyn. His maternal grandfather was Yaakov Aizer Dubrow, the rabbi of Kesher Israel in Washington D.C. He attended Yeshiva Rabbeinu Chaim Berlin for elementary and high school, before going to learn in the Telshe Yeshiva in Cleveland and the Yeshiva Chafetz Chaim in Williamsburg, Brooklyn. Due to his wanting to dorm, in 1951, at the age of 18, he went to learn in Beth Medrash Govoha in Lakewood, New Jersey and became a student of Aharon Kotler, whom he served tea to every day. While there, he was appointed the veker (someone who wakes the students up for the shacharis prayer). Among the students that he woke up every day was Shmuel Kamenetsky. Shlomo Carlebach was his chavrusa (study-partner) there for some time. In 1958, he married Trani Rosenblatt, who would one day be referred to by Rosenblatt as "my partner in Torah". Rosenblatt returned to Yeshiva Chafetz Chaim, then located in Queens, New York, at the age of 27, and became a student of Henoch Leibowitz.

== Rabbinic career ==
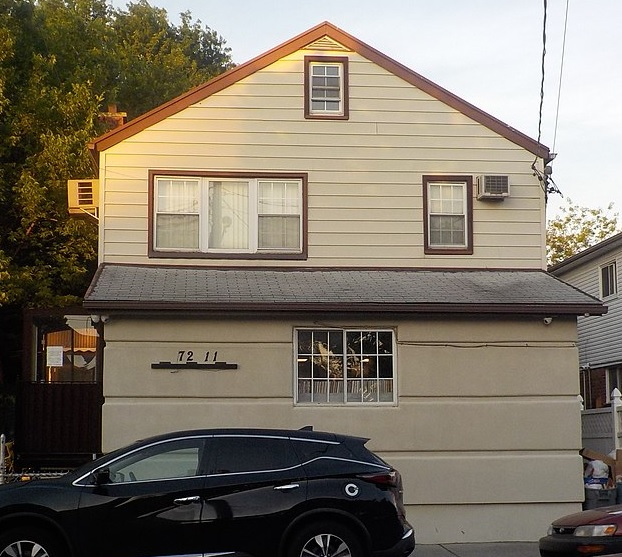
Yeshiva Kesser Torah in Kew Gardens Hills, Queens.

Rosenblatt remained in Yeshiva Chafetz Chaim, where he became a ninth grade mussar (ethics) rebbi. Among his students from Yeshiva Chafetz Chaim are Dovid Harris. Rosenblatt eventually went on to become a rabbi in Corona, Queens where he and his wife inspired non-religious Jews, teaching Torah and hosting them for Shabbos meals. In the 1970s, his students in Corona urged him to open a yeshiva, so Rosenblatt opened Yeshiva Kesser Torah in the Briarwood section of Queens. The yeshiva was named after a sefer. A dorm was added in 1980. In 1994, a rebbi in the yeshiva suggested that they relocate to Kew Garden Hills, where they would be able to attract more people, and a plot was purchased in the center of Kew Gardens Hills' Jewish community.

His classes in Yeshiva Kesser Torah were geared toward Jews of all backgrounds and professions. Over 500 of his classes are available for free online.

Rosenblatt died on March 27, 2019. His funeral was held at Yeshiva Kesser Torah that same day, and he was buried at the Beth David Cemetery in Elmont, New York.

== Works ==
Rosenblatt authored four sefarim on the Torah, under the name Ohr Lenisivasi. A fifth sefer, based on his musar teachings, was published after his death, under the same name. Rosenblatt was known to be very musical. It has been said that Aharon Kotler would ask him and two other students in Beth Medrash Govoha to sing at shalosh seudos (the third Sabbath meal). He composed many songs which are available on his Shaar Haneginah CDs.
