= Dovid Harris =

Orthodox rabbi

Rabbi Rabbi Dovid Harris Shlit"a
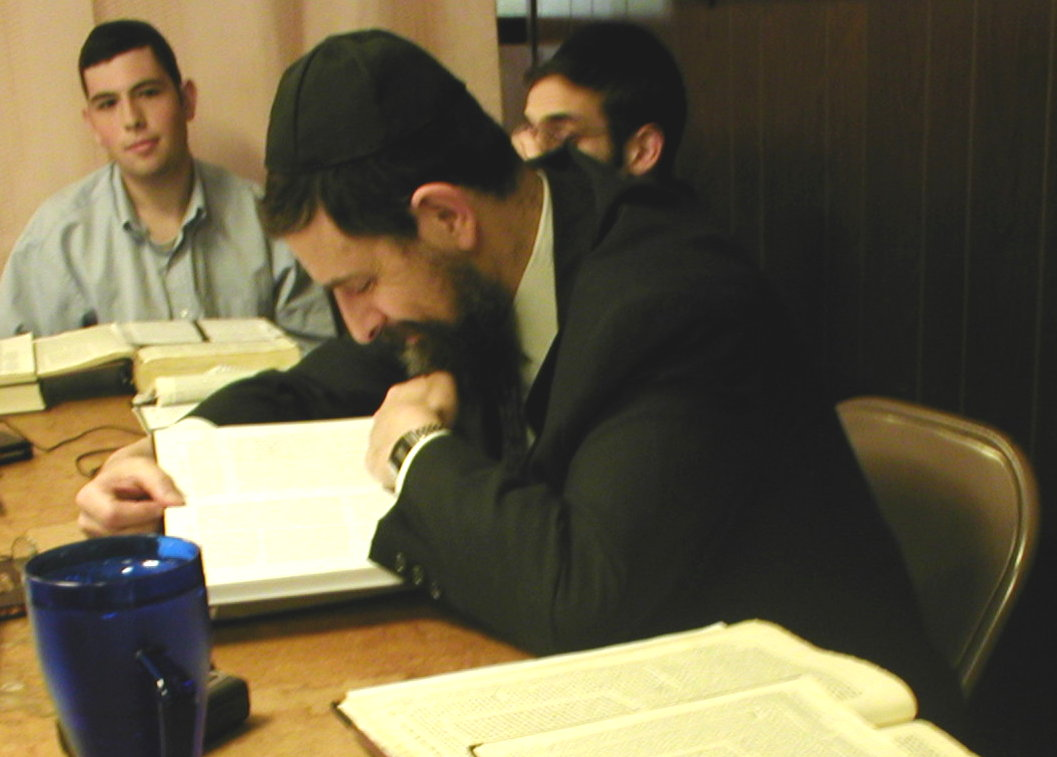
- Rabbi Dovid Harris giving shiur

Personal life
- Born: Dovid; 1945 (age 80–81) Scranton, Pennsylvania
- Children: Shlomo Zalman
- Parent(s): Sam and Mildred Harris
- Education: Yeshivas Chofetz Chaim
- Occupation: Rabbi

Religious life
- Religion: Judaism
- Denomination: Orthodox
- Profession: Rosh Hayeshiva/head of yeshiva

Jewish leader
- Predecessor: Rabbi Henoch Leibowitz
- Position: Rabbi
- Synagogue: Yeshivas Chofetz Chaim
- Yeshiva: Yeshivas Chofetz Chaim
- Organization: Yeshivas Chofetz Chaim
- Began: April 15, 2008
- Ended: Incumbent
- Residence: Kew Gardens Hills, Queens, New York
- Semikhah: Yeshivas Chofetz Chaim

Rabbi Dovid Harris (born 1945) is an Orthodox rabbi who, along with Rabbi Akiva Grunblatt and Rabbi Shaul Opoczynski, serves as Rosh Hayeshiva (deans) at the Yeshivas Rabbeinu Yisrael Meir HaKohen (Chofetz Chaim). He is a prominent figure in the yeshiva world and speaks annually at the Torah Umesorah - National Society for Hebrew Day Schools convention. He also serves on the rabbinic advisory committee of Torah Umesorah.

== Life and education ==
Harris was born in 1945 in Scranton, Pennsylvania, where he attended Scranton Hebrew Day school. From there, he went to the Rabbinical Seminary of America in Queens, New York, graduating high school and continuing in its post-high school program. In 1964, Harris, along with the entire yeshiva, traveled to Israel to study, returning there in 1968, where he remained to help strengthen the Israel branch. Harris would complete his studies at the yeshiva in 1973 after receiving his rabbinic ordination. He has continued working for the yeshiva and its affiliates.

== Career ==
In 1974, he co-founded the school's first external affiliate branch, the Talmudical Institute of Upstate New York, together with Rabbi Menachem Davidowitz.

In the fall of 1988, Harris also founded Mesivta Tiferes Yisroel, a branch of the Chofetz Chaim network.

== See also ==
- Yeshivas Rabbeinu Yisrael Meir HaKohen
- Mesivta Tiferes Yisroel (an affiliate school).
- Talmudical Institute of Upstate New York (an affiliate school).
- Rabbi Binyomin Luban
