= Elkayam =

Elkayam or Elkayem (Hebrew: אלקיים) is a Jewish surname of North African Jewish origin. Notable people with tyhe name include:

- Cochav Elkayam-Levy, Israeli legal scholar and human rights advocate
- Eliran Elkayam, Israeli football player
- Ellory Elkayem, New Zealand film director
- Oded Elkayam, Israeli footballer
- Neta Elkayam (born 1980), Israeli singer

== See also ==
- Elkaïm
- Elyakim
