= Shlomo Levinger =

American magician (born 1997)

- Born: 1997 (age 28); Queens, New York City, U.S.
- Occupations: Magician; mentalist
- Spouse: Shani Roth (m. 2022)
- Website: shlomolevinger.com

Shlomo Levinger (born 1997) is an American magician and mentalist. He has performed internationally and has been called "the athletes' magician" due to his performances for various major-league baseball teams, and also posts videos of his performances online.

== Life and career ==
Shlomo Levinger was born in 1997 to Rabbi Chaim and Tova Levinger. He grew up in the Kew Gardens neighborhood of Queens, New York, and has four siblings. He was a baseball fan and he studied at Yeshiva Ketana of Queens and Tiferes Moshe for elementary school, followed by Yeshivas Chofetz Chaim for high school. His interest in magic began after he watched an online video of a magician performing card tricks. From then on, he continuously practiced magic as his skills progressed. After graduating high school he studied in Chofetz Chaim in Israel, after which he returned to the United States and attended the Yeshiva of Waterbury.

Levinger began his career at the age of 14 by performing street magic in New York City and posting videos of these performances online. His brother, Dave, serves as his videographer. At age 17, he started performing at small events, with his first paid gig being a Chanuka party where he earned $50. He continued to perform at various events throughout his time at yeshiva. Levinger's career advanced in 2021 after baseball player Mike Trout started following him on Instagram. Initially skeptical, Levinger soon realized it was Trout's official account and sent him a message. Trout expressed interest in seeing Levinger perform live, leading to a special performance in late August 2021. Levinger entertained Trout, Justin Upton, Dexter Fowler, Alex Cobb and Anthony Rizzo in the Angel Stadium players' parking lot after a game against the New York Yankees. The hour-long set, posted on YouTube, went viral and attracted attention from other baseball players, including Alex Bregman, who requested live performances.

Levinger is known for his performances for various sports teams, leading to him being named "the athletes' magician" by Sports Illustrated. He performed for the Los Angeles Dodgers in their clubhouse during spring training in March 2024 and then for the Los Angeles Angels in March 2025. His performances have also included appearances for baseball teams such as the Houston Astros, the New York Yankees, and the New York Mets, and the Nashville Predators ice hockey team. He does not charge for his performances for sports teams, besides for travel expenses.

He has also performed for celebrities such as Kris Bryant, Donovan Mitchell, Ben Shapiro, and companies like Sony and ABC Audio. Additionally, he has performed at several charity events, including those for Joe Smith and Walker Buehler, and at various international events.

Levinger is described as having a casual, amiable, and non-threatening presence. His persona as a magician is portrayed as being "the guy next door" who has some cool tricks, aiming to create a "light energy" rather than something "creepy." He tries to be creative and original in his work, and he has a laid-back vibe and a natural, non-gimmicky style.

Levinger is an Orthodox Jew and always performs wearing a yarmulke and tzitzis. He married Shani Roth in April 2022, and they live in Far Rockaway, New York. They had a son, Avi, in June 2025.
