= Gadi Pollack =

Israeli illustrator and author

Gadi Pollack (Hebrew: גדי פולק; born 1969/1970) is an Israeli illustrator and author of Haredi children's books.

He has over 45 published books, some of them collaborations with Baruch Chait.

== Biography ==
=== Early life and education ===
Gadi Pollack was born in Odesa to an unobservant Jewish family. His family then moved to Moscow due to his father Yona Pollack being an officer in the Soviet army. Gadi Pollack's grandfather, Moshe Yehuda Pollack, was a religious Jew who was murdered by Ukrainian peasants; his wife died of typhus while attempting to flee. Yona Pollack was raised in an orphanage in Kirgizia without any connection to Judaism. When he became eighteen, he enlisted in the Red Army as a musician. Gadi Pollack's mother was a doctor.

Pollack was raised in a musical home. Everyone in his family played an instrument, and he himself took piano lessons for four years. Despite this, at the age of ten he asked his father to let him attend art school. At the age of fifteen, he unsuccessfully applied to the sculpture program in an art academy. He instead apprenticed under a local well-known sculptor for a year, after which he successfully reapplied to the Academy of Music, Theatre and Fine Arts in Kishinev in the sculpture department at the age of seventeen. Pollack studied there for about four years, after which he served in the Red army per mandatory conscription. While in the army, Gadi Pollack worked as a graphics designer and cartoonist for an army newspaper.

Following his army service, Pollack returned to Kishinev and worked for an advertising agency as an artist. According to him, around this time he was first exposed to Judaism by a priest who hired him to illustrate a weekly comic based on Biblical stories. He began to study the Bible to create his comics and came up with questions that he later posed to the priest, whose answers did not satisfy him. Pollack thereafter met a group of skullcap-wearing Jewish youth. He asked them questions related to Judaism to which they gave answers that seemed reasonable to him. Following this incident, Pollack developed an interest in Judaism and gradually became observant.

=== Illustrating and writing career ===
Gadi Pollack immigrated to Israel in 1993 and started to work as a graphic designer and as an animator for children's learning software. He married and started learning in a kollel. He met illustrator Yoni Gerstein and asked for help in finding clients, which led Pollack to meet Baruch Chait, a composer and author of Jewish books for youth. They collaborated to make multiple books, the first book which Gadi Pollack illustrated being Tell Me What You Think.

Pollack has illustrated since then around 50 books, including collaborations and independent works, some of which have become very popular within the observant Jewish world, like musar literature works such as The Terrifying Trap of the Bad Middos Pirates, The Lost Treasure of Tikun HaMiddos Island, and others; as well as a book on the Purim story entitled PurimShpiel and a Passover Haggadah, which involved extensive research into relevant commentaries and midrashim. He also wrote a series of three (as of 2020) books, known as A Yiddishe Kop, which is a series of puzzles. Over 200,000 A Yiddishe Kop books were sold.

== Personal life ==
Gadi Pollack lives in Kiryat Sefer in the West Bank. He does not allow the media in interviews with him to publish photos of him to protect his anonymity. He learns every day in a kollel with fellow artist David Goldschmidt and does most of his work at nighttime.
