= Zev Leff =

American rabbi

Rabbi Zev Leff זאב לף

Personal life
- Born: Bronx, New York, US
- Spouse: Rivkah Minkoff

Religious life
- Religion: Judaism
- Denomination: Haredi Judaism
- Position: Mora d'asra
- Organisation: Moshav Matityahu
- Began: 1983
- Other: Rav of the Young Israel of Greater Miami, Florida (1974–1983)
- Residence: Moshav Matityahu
- Semikhah: Telshe yeshiva

Zev Leff (Hebrew: זאב לף) is an American-born Haredi rabbi, educator, author, and speaker. After serving as rabbi of the Young Israel of Greater Miami, Florida, for nine years, he and his family moved to Moshav Matityahu, an Israeli settlement in the West Bank, in 1983, where he is the mara d'asra (rabbinic communal leader).

== Early life and education ==
Zev Leff was born in Bronx, New York, to a Jewish family. His parents and grandparents were all American-born. He attended public school and an Orthodox Talmud Torah in the afternoons. After his family moved to North Miami Beach, Florida, he attended a Conservative Hebrew school run by religious teachers, who convinced him to transfer to a yeshiva. He was accepted at the Hebrew Academy of Greater Miami and subsequently attended the Mesivta of Greater Miami. He was a Talmid of Rabbi Berel Wein.

At age 17 he progressed to the Telshe yeshiva in Cleveland, Ohio, where he received his rabbinic ordination and became a close talmid (student) of Rabbi Mordechai Gifter.

In 1968, he married Rivkah Minkoff of Ellenville, New York. The couple settled in Cleveland, where Leff studied in the Telshe kollel for the next six years. He also taught in the Yavneh girls' high school and seminary.

== Rabbinic career ==
In 1974, Leff was appointed Rav of the Young Israel of Greater Miami, located in North Miami Beach, Florida. At the time, the congregation consisted of about 150 families, of whom 90 percent were Sabbath-observant. By the time he left nine years later, the congregation numbered 300 families.

In 1983, Leff and his family decided to make aliyah to Israel, where he became the Rav and mora d'asra (rabbinic communal leader) of Moshav Matityahu, a small settlement now adjacent to Modi'in Illit (Kiryat Sefer). At the time, the moshav was home to 11 families. Leff characterized the residents of Matityahu as "American chareidi, people who had a tremendous love for Eretz Yisrael. We were very pro-Eretz Yisrael and not against the medinah [state], but we also didn't say Hallel on Yom Haatzma'ut". As of 2018, the moshav is home to approximately 150 families, of whom 30 to 40 percent are Israeli. Leff also serves as dean of the moshav's kollel. From 2006 to 2016, he headed the moshav's yeshiva gedola, which was geared to American-born students.

In addition to his communal duties, Leff teaches in several girls' seminaries in Jerusalem. He is a faculty member of Darchei Binah Women's School for Advanced Torah Studies and the Jewish Learning Exchange of London. He also teaches at Seminar Yerushalayim, Neve Yerushalayim's Midreshet Tehillah, Michlala Women's College, and Bnot Torah; he formerly taught at the EYAHT College for Jewish Women. He teaches "practical rabbinics" for the Ohr Lagolah Institute (based in Ohr Somayach, Jerusalem). He delivers a twice-monthly shiur to a group of English-speakers in Netanya.

Leff has been a featured speaker at the conventions of the Orthodox Union, Agudath Israel of America, Torah Umesorah, and the Association for Jewish Outreach Programs.

He is a rabbinic consultant for the Refuah Institute and Baruch Rofeh Cholim.

== Soccer game coverage ==
In November 2018, a Sky News video of Leff engrossed in a sefer at a Scotland–Israel UEFA Nations League soccer game, oblivious to the excitement in the stadium after Israel scored its first goal, went viral. Leff and his wife had been visiting their daughter and son-in-law, the latter a UK Rabbanut chaplain for all the universities in Glasgow, and accompanied the entire community to dinner and the game. As he personally had no interest in the match, Leff brought his Talmud Yerushalmi along to study the Daf Yomi. The sight of the rabbi studying his sefer during the game generated jokes and memes across social media platforms.

== Opinions ==
In The Jewish Press's "Is It Proper" series on the topic of the loudness of music played at religious weddings, Leff remarked, "Music (even music with lyrics that are based on verses from Tanach or tefillah) whose beat, tempo, or volume creates a mood of wild abandon (hefkerus), or could accompany primitive natives dancing around a cauldron cooking a human being, is not kosher irrespective of who composed it or is playing it – be they non-Jews or religious Jews".

== Bibliography ==
- Outlooks and Insights on the Weekly Torah Portion. Mesorah Publications, Ltd. 1993. ISBN 9780899065311.
- Shemoneh Esrei: the Depth and Beauty of our Daily Tefillah. Targum Press. 2008. ISBN 9781568714714.
- Festivals of Life: the Depth and Meaning of the Moadim. Targum Press. 2009. ISBN 9781568715179.
- Leff, Zev (2014). Shemoneh Esrei for Shabbos: The Depth and Beauty of Our Shabbos Tefillos. ISBN 9781614651796.

== CDs ==
- Jewish Heritage Journey with Rabbi Leff: A Multimedia Jewish Heritage Journey to Lithuania, Poland & Belarus (Shorashim Productions and Grafix Mediaworx, distributed by Torah Educational Software)
