= Maarava Machon Rubin =

Haredi Yeshiva high school in Matityahu, West Bank

Coordinates: 31°55′50″N 35°01′37″E

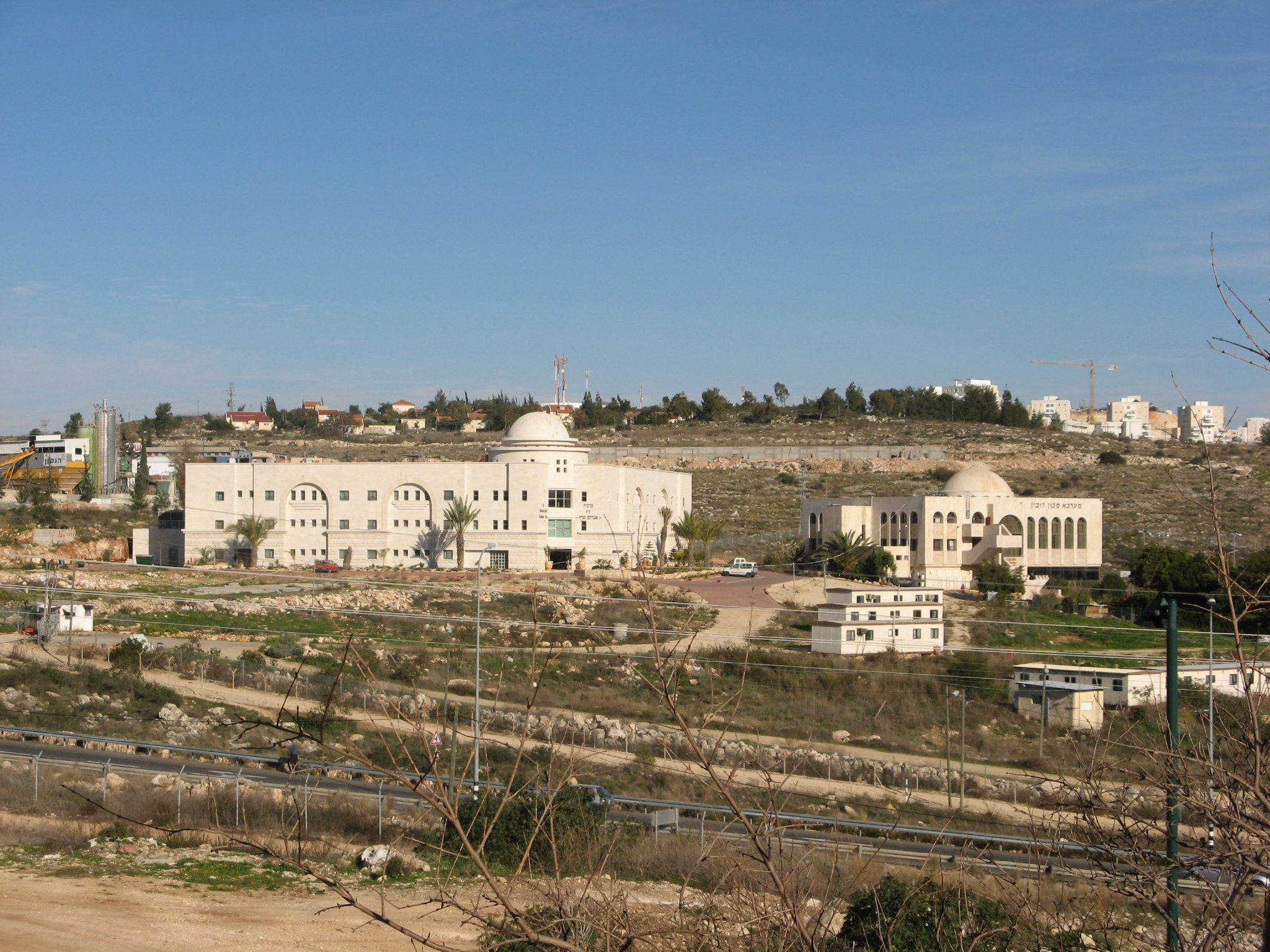
Yeshivat Maarava

Maarava Machon Rubin is an Orthodox yeshiva high school located in the Israeli settlement of Matityahu, near Modi'in, midway between Jerusalem and Tel Aviv. The yeshiva was founded and is headed by Rabbi Baruch Chait who is originally from the United States.

The institution was dedicated by Moshe and Elaine Rubin in memory of his parents, Yosef Dov and Sheindel, and siblings, Akiva, Yehudah Aryeh, and Rivkah, who were murdered by the Nazis during the Holocaust.

Maarava Machon Rubin prides itself in conforming to the characteristics of a traditional Ultra Orthodox Judaism yeshiva (only religious students and an intensive Talmudic studies program) while providing secular studies classes allowing students to earn Bagrut (the Israeli Ministry of Education high school diploma).
