= Naftoli Shapiro =

British rabbi (1906–1981)

Rabbi Naftoli Shapiro (Hebrew: נפתולי שפירא; 1906–1981) was an Orthodox Talmudic scholar and rosh yeshiva in Glasgow for 40 years.

Born in 1906 in the town of Mir, Poland, Rabbi Shapiro studied at the prestigious Mir yeshiva from the age of twelve. He also learned at the Raduń Yeshiva and was a pupil of the Chofetz Chaim. Rabbi Shapiro studied at the Łomża yeshiva, where he was appointed teacher to senior students preparing for semicha. He studied in the Łomża Kollel under the renowned Gaon Rabbi Aaron Yosef Bakst.

Due to a directive from Rabbi Elchonon Wasserman for a permanent yeshiva with a head to be set up in Glasgow, a "call" was sent to Rabbi Shapiro, who arrived to lead the fledgling institution in 1936, three years after its founding.

Rabbi Shapiro went on to lead the yeshiva for forty years until 1976. During this period, he married a daughter of Rev. Dr. Israel W. Slotki of Manchester and founded the Glasgow Vaad Hayeshivos (yeshiva council), the Tiferes Bochurim youth movement and the Sabbath Observance Organisation. He also obtained an MA from the University of Glasgow. In 1956, he was appointed rabbi of the newly amalgamated Great Central Synagogue, Glasgow, and later became vice-president of the Glasgow Association of Rabbis. He had a wife, Shulamit Rose.

During his extensive tenure in Glasgow, Rabbi Shapiro delivered several long-running shiurim in the city and lectured extensively; he was a tireless advocate of traditional Jewish life and learning. Rabbi Shapiro retired to Jerusalem in 1976, where he died in 1981. He was buried on Har HaMenuchot, and eulogies were delivered by the head of the Vaad Hayeshivos and the rabbi of the Gerrer shtibl where Rabbi Shapiro prayed in his final years.
