= Ottawa Torah Institute =

Location
- 1119 Lazard Street; Ottawa, Ontario, k2c 2r5 Canada; 45°21′35.9″N 75°45′48.7″W

Information
- School type: Independent offering secular and religious education Yeshiva High School
- Religious affiliation: Orthodox Judaism
- Opened: 1982
- Closed: End of 2020-2021 school year
- Head of school: Rabbi Nachum Aron Hakohen, 2019-2022
- Grades: 9-12
- Campus: 1119 Lazard Street, Ottawa, Ontario
- Affiliation: Yeshivas Rabbeinu Yisrael Meir HaKohen Yeshiva High School of Ottawa
- Website: yhso.ca

Ottawa Torah Institute was a yeshiva high school located in Ottawa, providing secular and Judaic education. Founded in 1982 as a boys' school, it was Ottawa's first full-time Jewish high school. In 1990 the high school expanded to include a girls' division, known as Machon Sarah. Graduates from Ottawa Torah Institute earned an Ontario Secondary School Diploma.

== History ==
In 1981, Reuven Bulka brought a Jewish educational program from Yeshivas Chofetz Chaim to Machzikei Hadas synagogue. In 1982, this was followed by Rabbis Yisroel Morgenstern and Yaakov Deitsch of Yeshivas Chofetz Chaim opening a Yeshiva High School for boys and establishing OTI as Ottawa's first full-time Jewish high school for boys.

Rabbi Eliezer Ben-Porat was head of school for twenty five years. The school was later run by the team of Rabbi Yaakov Moshe Harris (from 2013 to 2019) and Rabbi Dovid Mandel (from 2013 - 2018). It was headed by Rabbi Baruch Dov Perton from 2018-2021. Rabbi Michael Fine then ended the 2021 school year; in 2022, Ottawa Torah Institute and Machon Sarah merged with the Torah Day School elementary. The high school is now known as Yeshiva High School of Ottawa.

== See also ==
- List of schools in Ottawa
