= Daniel Elyakim =

Israeli chess player (born 1953)

Daniel Elyakim (Hebrew: דניאל אליקים; born 1953) is a chess player who holds the title of International Correspondence Chess Grandmaster and was the Israeli champion of correspondence chess for the 1986 championship. He lives in Ramat Gan.

Major tournaments that Elyakim played in the past or is playing currently.

Start date	Name of the tournament	Site	Board for a team event	Place in individual event	Number of games	Category	GM norm	Actual result
15 December 1992	XII OL Preliminaries		5	-	11	-	-	9.5
1 May 1997	The Israeli Champion of champions		-	3	10	-	-	6.5
30 May 1998	XIII OL Preliminaries		2	-	11	-	-	8
1 October 1999	Zagorovsky Memorial		-	3-5	12	12	7.5	7.5
15 January 2003	OLYMPIAD XV - Preliminaries		1	-	10	10	7	7
16 October 2004	European TC VI, Final		4	-	13	11	8	3.5

Elyakim ICCF rating is 2539 (updated 9.2008) and he holds the 5th place in Israel.
