= The Kooks (Swedish band) =

Swedish rock band

- Origin: Sweden
- Genres: Indie rock, alternative rock
- Years active: 1998 – (now)
- Labels: Stockholm Re & Mass Produktion
- Members: Henrik Berglund; Leo Dahlin; Michael Lohse; Daniel Bengtson
- Past members: Josef Zackrisson

The Kooks are a Swedish Indie, alternative rock band formed in 1998. This band was formed by Henrik Berglund, Leo Dahlin, Michael Lohse, Josef Zackrisson. Micke Lohse and Henrik Berglund are both members of the current Atomic Swing Band.

== Album notes ==
Michael and Henrik soon hooked up with lead guitarist Leo Dahlin and bass player Josef Zackrison. The original setup started working on making demos. They soon cut a record deal with Stockholm Records, after that the headman at the company Ola Håkansson had fallen in love with their demo containing the song "Too Much Of Nothing".

The Kooks released their first single "Too Much of Nothing" back in 1998. It became a major radio chart climber in both Sweden and Denmark. They followed up with the debut album "Too Much Is Not Enough" in 1999 and started touring all over Sweden. They did support gigs with The Soundtrack of Our Lives and Robbie Williams. After this quick and apparently successful start the band came to a dead end.

-Everyday boredom is a necessity in order to write music. If you don't have anything to say you might as well shut up for a while. Sometimes you have to disappear for a while in order to be reborn, says Michael.

In the end the band's musical visions didn't meet up with the record company's business ambitions. The Kooks left Stockholm Records in the year 2000. Soon after this bassplayer Josef left the band to focus on his solo album. The band started to search for someone to replace their former talented bassplayer. In the summer of 2000 Daniel Bengtson joined the band. Their first new release was a single "Late Night Movies", released in June 2001 on a new independent label Morphine Lane Records (formed by Michael Lohse and Johan Nilsson)Finally The Kooks second album was released in 2004 on Morphine Lane Records. Melodic high energy rock with shades of Ian Hunter, Mott The Hoople and even David Bowie are in evidence on the CD.

== Discography ==
Albums	Tracks	Release date
Too Much Is Not Enough	1. Indigo Lights; 2. Higher Ground; 3. In Love; 4. Salvation In Time; 5. Turbulence Beat; 6. Prisoner; 7. Move On; 8. Life In The Middle; 9. Bruce Emms; 10. Things That Are Good; 11. Too Much Of Nothing; 12. Regrets	15 September 1999
Verbal Jujitsu	1. Morphine Lane; 2. Doing Fine; 3. I'm Looking Better (Than Ever); 4. 21st Century Dancers; 5. Forty Nights; 6. Roller Coaster No. 2; 7. Second Rate; 8. Odd Society; 9. Automatic; 10. Late Night Movies	3 December 2002
