= Eliakim ben Meshullam =

German rabbi

Eliakim ben Meshullam Halevi (born about 1030; died at the end of the eleventh century in Speyer, Rhenish Bavaria) was a German rabbi, Talmudist and payyeṭan.

He studied at the yeshivot in Mainz and Worms, having Rashi as a fellow student. Eliakim himself founded a Talmudical school in Speyer.

He wrote a commentary on all the tractates of the Talmud except Berakot and Niddah (see Solomon Luria, Responsa, No. 29, and Asher ben Jehiel, Responsa, Rule 1, § 8), which was used by scholars as late as the fourteenth century. At present there exists only the commentary on Yoma, in manuscript (Codex Munich, No. 216).

Ritual decisions by Eliakim are mentioned by Rashi ("Pardes," 42a, 44c, 48a). He was the composer of a piyyuṭ, to be read when a circumcision takes place in the synagogue on a Saturday.
