= Naftoli Trop =

Naftoli Tzvi Trop
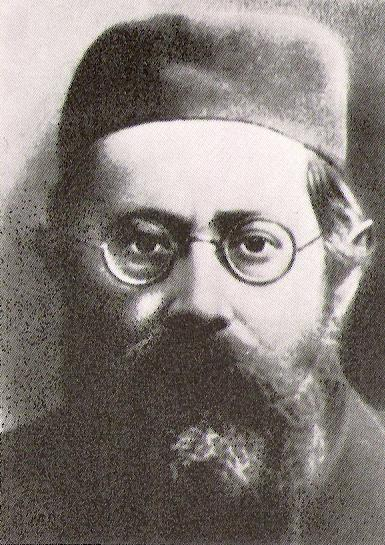
- Rabbi Naftoli Trop
- Born: April 1871
- Died: September 24, 1928 (aged 57)

Rabbi Naftoli Trop (April 1871 - September 24, 1928) was a renowned Talmudist and Talmid Chacham. He served as rosh yeshiva of Yeshiva Chofetz Chaim in Radun, Poland.

== Early years ==
In his youth he studied with his father, who was rosh yeshiva of a local yeshiva, and at 14, he left to learn in Kelm, where his study partner for ten years was Yerucham Levovitz, who went on to become mashgiach of the Mir yeshiva. Rabbi Trop proceeded to briefly study in Slabodka and Telz, where he became close to Eliezer Gordon. He learned for a short time in the Novardok yeshiva in Slonim, where he formed a close relationship with Yosef Yozel Horwitz (known as "the Alter of Novardok"). In 1889, when Yaakov Yitzchak (Itzele) Rabinowitz was appointed rosh yeshiva at Slabodka, Trop returned to Slabodka to study under Rabinowitz.

At the age of twenty-one, Trop became engaged to the daughter of Nosson Tzvi Finkel. However, she died a few months before the wedding. In 1895, Trop married Pesya Leah, the daughter of Eliezer Yaakov Chavas of Yanishok. Shortly after the wedding, he returned to Kelm where he joined a large group of young married scholars. He was greatly influenced by the mussar movement approach he chiefly absorbed in Kelm, but also in Slobodka and by means of his contact with Horowitz in Slonim. After four years of studying in Kelm, Trop was appointed rosh yeshiva of the Or HaChaim yeshiva in Slabodka, by its founder, Tzvi (Hirshel) Levitan.

== Raduń ==
In 1903, by invitation of Yisrael Meir Kagan, Trop replaced Rabbi Moshe Landinski as rosh yeshiva in Raduń, where he remained for the rest of his life. Among his students in Radin were Dovid Leibowitz, Yechezkel Sarna, Yitzchok Zev Soloveitchik and Yosef Shlomo Kahaneman. Kahaneman studied for over five years in Raduń under Trop.

== Works ==
- Chiddushei ha-Granat, a series of talmudic lectures, published in 1989.
- Trop's lectures on Nedarim were prepared by Binyomin Luban.
- Additional methodical editions of Trop's discourses were published by Moshe Drayen of Jerusalem in 1985.
