= Benjamin Eliakim Yates =

Personal life
- Born: Benjamin ben Eliakim Goetz
- Died: 1798
- Buried: Liverpool, England

Religious life
- Religion: Judaism

Benjamin Eliakim Yates (né Goetz, Yiddish: בנימין בן אליקים געץ; died 1798) was rabbi of the Jewish community of Liverpool, England.

== Biography ==
Benjamin Eliakim Yates was the older son of Eliakim Goetz of Strelitz, and was likely himself also a native of Strelitz. Upon arriving in England, he became an itinerant seal-engraver, eventually settling in one of the southwestern counties. He afterwards moved to Liverpool, where he became an engraver and working jeweller. In addition to his trade, he took on the role of rabbi of the city's fledgling Jewish congregation, as well as ḥazzan, shoḥet, and mohel. His residence at 109 Frederick Street is believed to have been the first regular synagogue in Liverpool. Its small garden functioned as a burial ground, with Benjamin Yates being the final individual laid to rest there.

Following his passing, Benjamin's younger brother Samuel relocated to Liverpool, likely assuming responsibility for the engraving and jewellery business that Benjamin had left behind. Samuel Yates and his wife Martha (née Abrahams) of Shaftesbury were the ancestors of the leading families of the Liverpool Jewish community, whose members included Herbert, Viscount Samuel and Sir Stuart Samuel.
