= Young Israel of Flatbush =

Synagogue building in Brooklyn, New York

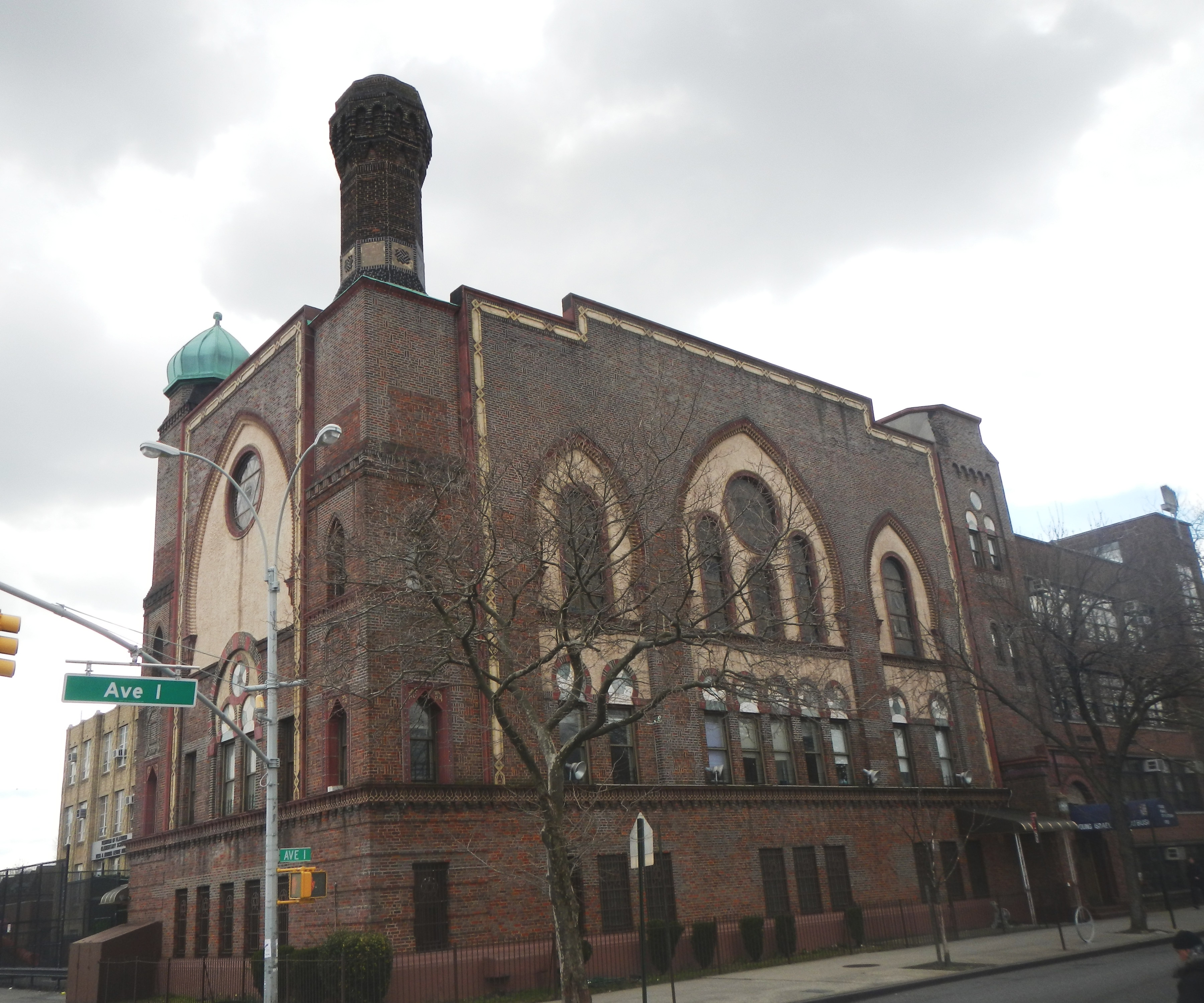
- The former synagogue, in 2013

- Location of the former synagogue in New York City

Religion
- Affiliation: Orthodox Judaism (former)
- Rite: Nusach Ashkenaz
- Ecclesiastical or organisational status: Synagogue (1921–2021)
- Leadership: Rabbi Kenneth Auman
- Status: Abandoned; Congregation merged

Location
- Location: 1012 Avenue I, Midwood, Brooklyn, New York City, New York
- Country: United States
- Coordinates: 40°37′37″N 73°57′57″W

Architecture
- Architect: Louis Allen Abramson
- Type: Synagogue architecture
- Style: Moorish Revival
- Established: 1921; 105 years ago (as a congregation)
- Completed: 1929
- Young Israel of Flatbush
- U.S. National Register of Historic Places
- New York State Register of Historic Places
- Area: less than one acre
- NRHP reference No.: 10000011
- NYSRHP No.: 04701.000446

Significant dates
- Added to NRHP: February 12, 2010
- Designated NYSRHP: December 16, 2009

Young Israel of Flatbush is a historic former Orthodox Jewish congregation and synagogue, located at 1012 Avenue I in Midwood, Brooklyn, New York City, New York, United States. The congregation worshiped in the Ashkenazi rite.

In 2021 the congregation merged with Talmud Torah of Flatbush to form Young Israel Talmud Torah of Flatbush, jointly affiliated with the National Council of Young Israel and the Orthodox Union. The merged congregation worships from the former Talmud Torah synagogue, located at 1305 Coney Island Avenue, in Brooklyn.

== History ==
Established as a congregation in 1921, the synagogue was built between 1925 and 1929 and is a three-story Moorish Revival-inspired style building faced in polychromatic patterned brick. It features horseshoe arches, minarets, and polychromatic tiles.

The synagogue was listed on the National Register of Historic Places in 2010.

This synagogue was one of the earliest, and for a long time one of the largest, branches of the National Council of Young Israel, a movement that requires all branches to have a rabbi. This requirement was not strictly enforced, at the time.

=== Clergy ===
Rabbi Solomon Sharfman served as the rabbi from 1938 until his retirement in 1984.

Rabbi Kenneth Auman is the current sprititual leader of the merged congregation.
