= Yeshiva Kesser Torah =

Jewish synagogue in Queens, NY

Yeshiva Kesser Torah Rabbinical College of Queens
- ישיבה כתר תורה
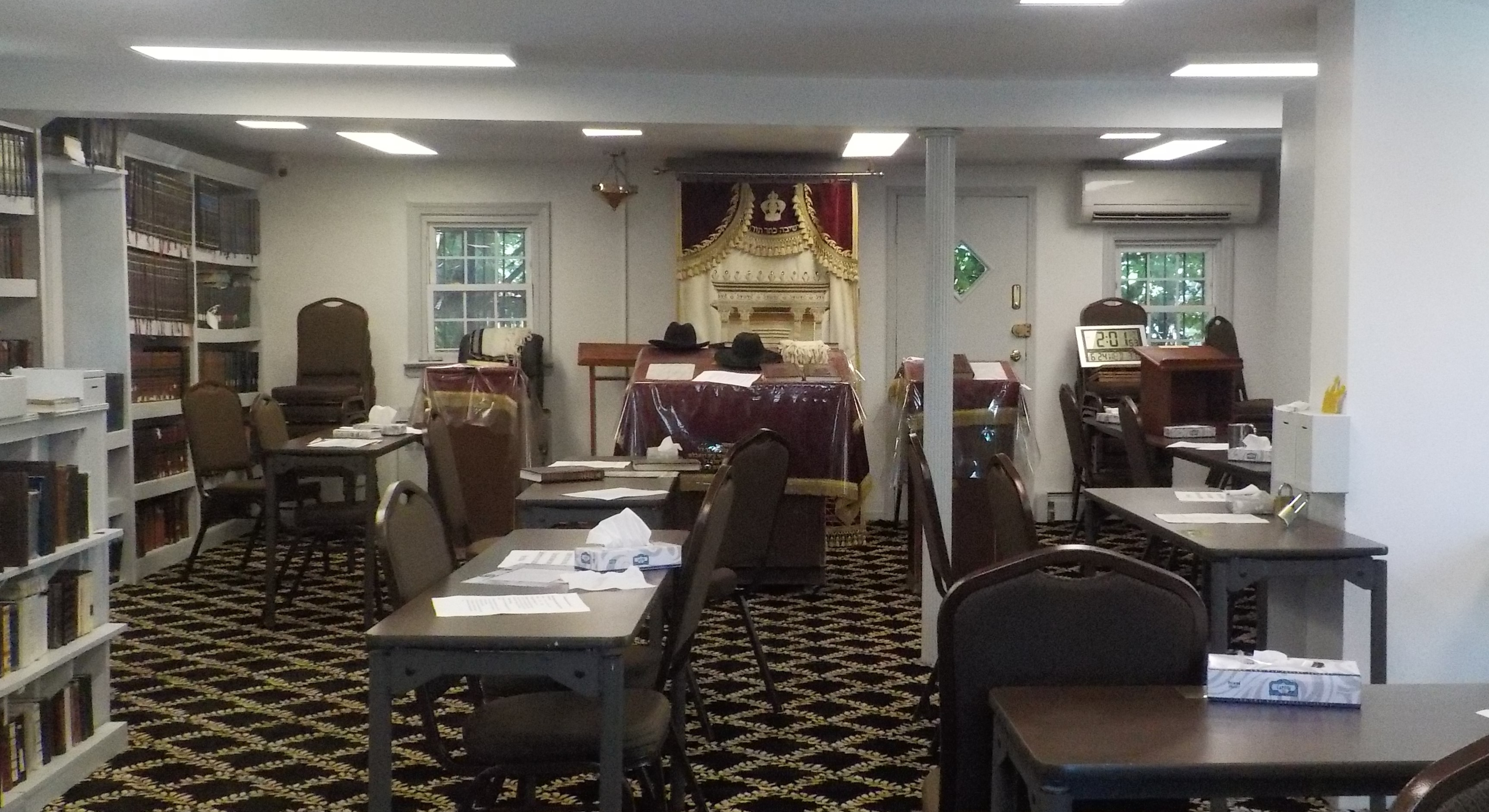
- Yeshiva Kesser Torah interior

Location
- 72-11 Vleigh Place, Kew Gardens Hills, Queens, New York City, New York; United States
- 40°43′35″N 73°49′15″W

Information
- Type: Yeshiva
- Religious affiliation: Orthodox Judaism
- Established: 1965
- Founder: Rabbi Elyakim Rosenblatt
- Website: yeshivakessertorah.org

Yeshiva Kesser Torah Rabbinical College of Queens (abbreviated as YKT; Hebrew: ישיבה כתר תורה) is an Orthodox Jewish yeshiva located at 72-11 Vleigh Place, in the Kew Gardens Hills section of Queens, in New York City, New York, in the United States.

Founded in 1965 by Rabbi Elyakim Rosenblatt in the Briarwood section as a kiruv (Jewish outreach) yeshiva. In 1994, it relocated to Kew Gardens Hills. It is known throughout the Queens Jewish community as a "minyan factory", a place where one can find a mincha minyan throughout the afternoon or maariv minyan until late into the night.

== History ==
Elyakim Rosenblatt was a student of both Aharon Kotler and Henoch Leibowitz. Leibowitz influenced him to spread Torah to as many Jews as possible. He therefore began teaching Torah to non-religious Jewish students in Corona, Queens, where he was a rabbi. Rosenblatt's students in Corona encouraged him to start Yeshiva Kesser Torah.

In the 1970s, (Note: Conflicting establishment dates; with the Yeshiva claiming 1965; and Garber claiming the 1970s.) Rosenblatt opened the yeshiva on the Grand Central Parkway in Briarwood, near Queens' Main Street, where it remained for over a decade. The dormitory was opened in 1980. In 1994, one of the rabbis in the yeshiva urged Rosenblatt to move Kesser Torah to Kew Gardens Hills, where they would be able to reach more people. They therefore purchased a house in the center of Kew Gardens Hills' Jewish community, where the yeshiva is located today. While the classes in Kesser Torah were intended mainly for non-religious Jews, there were classes aimed towards a general community audience. Over 500 of Rosenblatt's classes are accessible today.

=== Kew Gardens Hills ===
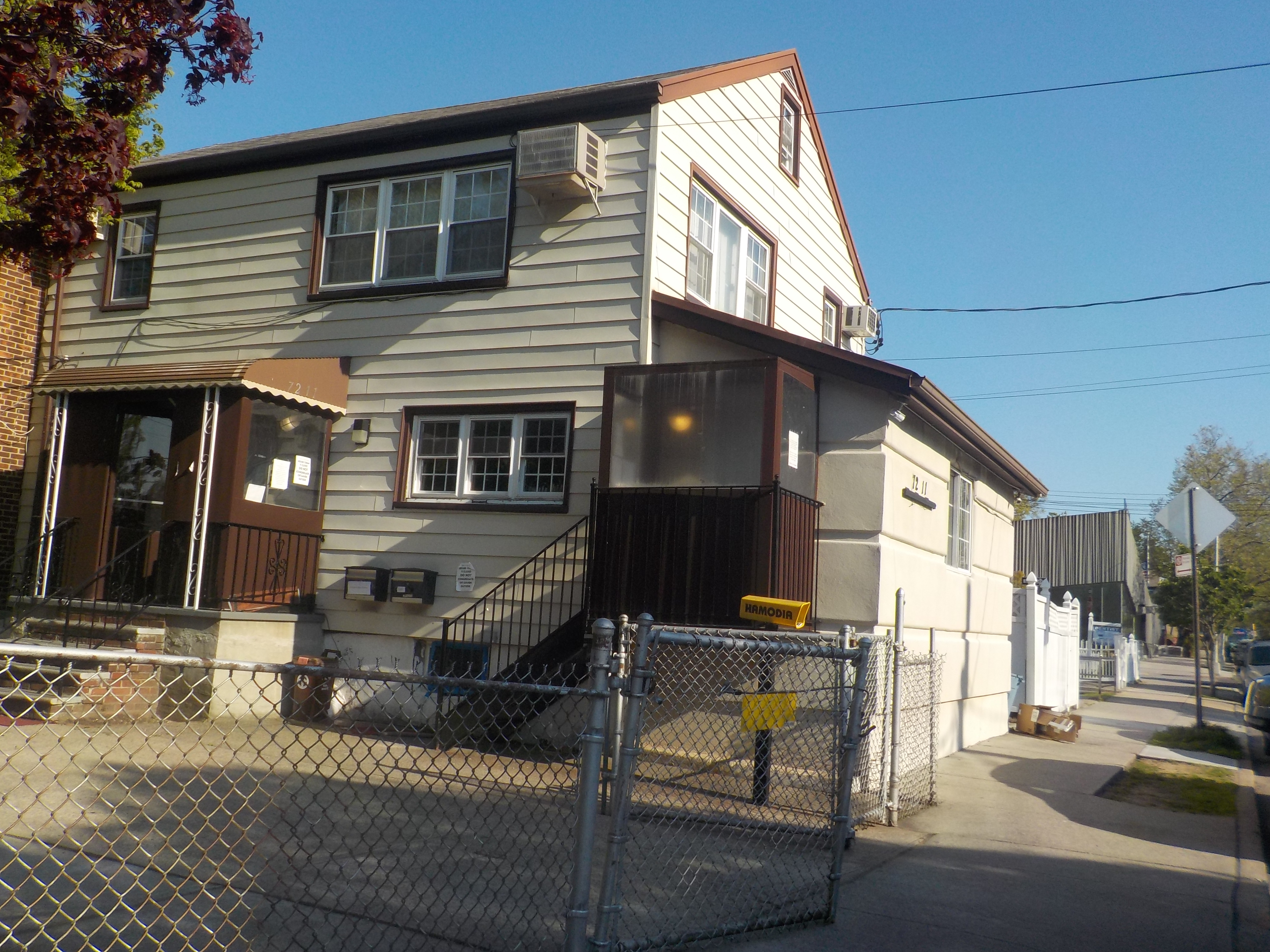
Yeshiva Kesser Torah in 2020

In the early 2000s, more minyanim (prayer groups) were added to the schedule, and the student body began to decrease. The yeshiva then began sponsoring mincha and maariv minyanim every thirty minutes, with the latest maariv minyan being held at 11:30 or midnight.

On Shabbat (Jewish Sabbath), Kesser Torah holds one Friday night kabbolas Shabbos and maariv, with shacharis the next morning followed by a small kiddush (meal), two minchas in the afternoon followed by a shalosh seudos (the third meal), and one maariv that night.
