= Talmudical Institute of Upstate New York =

Yeshiva of Rochester

Location
- 769 Park Avenue; Rochester, New York; United States; 43.1471°N 77.5750°W

Information
- Former name: Talmudical Institute of Upstate New York
- School type: Private High School, and Beis medrash Mesivta, Beis Medrash
- Religious affiliation: Orthodox Judaism
- Established: 1974
- Founders: Rabbi Menachem Davidowitz, Rabbi Dovid Harris
- Principal: Rabbi Yoni Polatoff
- Head teacher: Rabbi Menachem Davidowitz
- Teaching staff: 12
- Grades: 9-12, Beis Medrash, Kollel
- Website: www.tiuny.org

The Yeshiva of Rochester (formerly the Talmudical Institute of Upstate New York or TIUNY) is a yeshiva located in Rochester, New York. It is an American, Lithuanian style Haredi institution.

== History ==
TIUNY was founded in 1974 as the first external affiliate branch of the Chofetz Chaim education network by Rabbi Menachem Davidowitz and Rabbi Dovid Harris. In 2004, TIUNY opened a day school, Derech HaTorah of Rochester, for kindergarten through 8th

The Yeshiva is currently focused on helping the bochurim achieve mastery in learning with a seriousness toward ovdei Hashem while maintaining a balance of extra curricular activities.

== Notable alumni ==
- Yaakov Shwekey, Jewish singer
- Yechiel leiter, Israeli ambassador
