= Yeshiva of Cleveland =

Orthodox yeshiva in Ohio

Location
- 1516 Warrensville Center Rd; Cleveland Heights, Ohio; United States

Information
- Type: Private high school, and beis medrash
- Established: 2017
- Founder: Avrohom Fertig, Dovid Davidowitz
- Principal: Avrohom Fertig, Dovid Davidowitz, Yitzchak Kroll
- Website: www.yeshivaofcleveland.org

Yeshiva of Cleveland is an Orthodox yeshiva in Cleveland Heights, Ohio. An affiliate of Yeshiva Chofetz Chaim, it was founded in 2017 by Dovid Davidowitz and Avrohom Fertig.
