= Binyomin Luban =

American rabbi

Rabbi Binyomin Luban is the Rosh Yeshiva of Yeshiva Toras Chaim Toras Emes in North Miami Beach, Florida.

== Life and education ==
Rabbi Luban was born and raised in Holyoke, Massachusetts. His brother is Rabbi Yaakov Luban, the rabbinic coordinator of the Orthodox Union's Kashruth division. He attended the flagship high school of the Rabbinical Seminary of America (RSA) in Queens during the early 1970s. After completing high school he studied for a year at the Seminary's affiliate in the Sanhedria Murchevet section of Jerusalem, Israel. While there, he learned with Rabbi Avrohom Kanarek and Rabbi Shia Grodzitski, both students of Rabbi Boruch Ber Leibowitz, the dean of the pre-World War II rabbinical seminary, which was known as Kaminetz. Rabbi luban then returned to America, where he studied for over 15 years at RSA under the tutelage of Rabbi Henoch Leibowitz. He received his rabbinic ordination in the early 1980s.

== Career ==
In 1988 Rabbi Luban moved with his family to Jerusalem, Israel, where he took a position as a teacher at Yeshiva Chofetz Chaim-Israel Branch, his former school. He worked in conjunction with both Rabbi Kanarek and Rabbi Dovid Chait encouraging his students to grow in both Torah and Mussar. While there he incorporated the concept of a Mussar Vaad- an approach to help students deal with life's challenges. In the fall of 2000 Rabbi Luban was offered a position as Rosh Yeshiva of RSA's affiliate in North Miami Beach. After getting a blessing of success from Rabbi Leibowitz, he moved to Florida to assume the position. Under his auspices, the student body at the Bais Medrash level more than tripled.

Rabbi Luban began publishing his original Talmud ideas while a student at RSA. Since then, he has published works on at least eight tractates of the Talmud. Some have been published in several editions, as he is continuously expanding and revising those works. The name of his work is Biurim Veiyunim. He has also published Rabbi Henoch Leibowitz's shiurim on the Torah, called Chiddushei Haleiv (חידושי הלב). The recently published volume on Deuteronomy also containing a section with sermons on Lamentations and the Tisha B'Av (the Jewish day of mourning) prayer service.
