= Kol Ha'Olam Kulo =

Hebrew-language song by Baruch Chait

"Kol Ha'Olam Kulo" (Hebrew: כל העולם כולו, lit. 'The Whole Entire World') is a Hebrew language song by Orthodox Jewish rabbi Baruch Chait, adapted from an epigram attributed to the Hasidic rabbi Nachman of Breslov:

כָּל הָעוֹלָם כֻּלּוֹ גֶּשֶׁר צַר מְאוֹד
וְהָעִקָּר לֹא לְפַחֵד כְּלָל

Kol ha'olam kulo gesher tzar me'od
v'ha'ikar lo l'fached klal

The whole entire world is a very narrow bridge
and the main thing is to have no fear at all

The lyric is based on an excerpt from Likutei Moharan II #48. The original text is slightly different from the words of the song. Reb Nachman wrote:

וְדַע, שֶׁהָאָדָם צָרִיךְ לַעֲבֹר עַל גֶּשֶׁר צַר מְאֹד מְאֹד, וְהַכְּלָל וְהָעִקָּר – שֶׁלֹּא יִתְפַּחֵד כְּלָל

v'da, sheha'adam tzarikh la'avor al gesher tzar me'od me'od, v'hak'lal v'ha'ikar – shelo yitpached k'lal

Know that a person needs to cross a very very narrow bridge, and the rule, the essence, is to not give in to fear at all.

Israeli singer Ofra Haza also performs a popular version of the song.
