= The Kook =

- Directed by: Nat Livingston Johnson; Gregory Mitnick
- Written by: Nat Livingston Johnson; Gregory Mitnick
- Produced by: Christina King
- Starring: T Sahara Meer; Dan Burkarth
- Cinematography: Gregory Mitnick
- Edited by: Levi Abrino
- Music by: Sasha Gordon; Victor Magro
- Production company: Peking
- Release date: June 2, 2011 (CFC Worldwide Short Film Festival)
- Running time: 17 minutes
- Country: United States
- Language: English

The Kook is an American live action short film. The film's run time is approximately 17 minutes. It was written and directed by Nat Livingston Johnson and Gregory Mitnick, also known as the directing duo Peking, and produced by Christina King. It premiered at The CFC Worldwide Short Film Festival in Toronto, and screened as part of the 2012 Slamdance Film Festival.

== Plot ==
Fa is a gentle and unassuming member of an eccentric religious sect cloistered in the Catskill Mountains. On the eve of her group's scheduled "departure from Earth" Fa discovers that their leader, who appears to them as an alien hologram transmitted from a distant galaxy, is crossing signals with a man named Malcolm who lives close by. After failing to convince the others of what she's seen, Fa sets out alone into the "real world" to find Malcolm and confront the awful truth face to face.

== Reception ==
- Winner Best Short Film 2012 Madeira Film Festival
- Winner Best Narrative Short 2012 Macon Film Festival
- Winner Best Short Film 2012 Sunscreen Film Festival
- Winner Audience Award 2012 LES Film Festival
- Winner Best Comedy 2012 Rincon International Film Festival
- Winner Best Actress 2012 Rincon International Film Festival
- Winner Steven Susco Award 2012 Riverbend Film Festival
- Winner Best Sci-Fi 2012 Honolulu Film Awards
- Winner Best Actress Award 2011 LA Comedy Fest
- Winner Award Of Merit 2011 Accolade Competition
- Winner Audience Award 2011 First Run Film Festival
- Winner Best Comedy 2011 FirstGlance Film Festival Philadelphia
- In Competition 2011 Austin Film Festival
- In Competition 2012 Slamdance Film Festival
- In Competition 2011 Calgary International Film Festival
- In Competition 2012 Athens International Film + Video Film Festival
- In Competition 2012 Newport Beach Film Festival
- In Competition 2012 Riverrun International Film Festival
- In Competition 2011 CFC Worldwide Short Film Festival
- Official Selection 2011 New Orleans Film Festival
- In Competition 2011 LA Shorts Fest
