= Eliakim Koenigsberg =

American Orthodox rabbi and rosh yeshiva at Yeshiva University

Rabbi Eliakim Koenigsberg is an American Orthodox rabbi, educator, and rosh yeshiva at the Rabbi Isaac Elchanan Theological Seminary (RIETS) of Yeshiva University.

== Early life and education ==
Koenigsberg graduated summa cum laude from Yeshiva College in 1988. He received semikhah (rabbinic ordination) from the Rabbi Isaac Elchanan Theological Seminary in 1992. Later, he became a fellow of the Gruss Kollel Elyon, an advanced post-ordination program for top scholars at Yeshiva University.

== Career ==
Before joining the RIETS faculty as a rosh yeshiva, Koenigsberg worked for five years as a rebbe in the Stone Beit Midrash Program. He also held various educational positions at Yeshiva University High School for Boys, including roles as a shoel u-meishiv and teaching assistant. Additionally prior to working in MYP he was the:

- Director of the Presidential B’kiut Program
- Director of an advanced honors seminar on Shev Shemaitsa
- Rosh kollel of the YU Summer Kollel in Silver Spring, Maryland

He continues to give regular advanced Talmud lectures, many of which are available online. Koenigsberg was appointed rosh yeshiva of RIETS/MYP on October 6, 2000, where he delivers regular shiurim in Talmud and halakhah.

== Scholarship and publications ==
Rabbi Koenigsberg has published and edited several works, including:

- Kuntres He'aros al Maseches Yevamos – a collection of his notes on Tractate Yevamot.
- Editor of two volumes in the Shiurei HaRav series, which present and annotate the lectures of Rabbi Joseph B. Soloveitchik, including works on the laws of mourning, Tisha B’Av, shechitah, and kashrut.
