= North African Jews =

North African Jews may refer to:

- Maghrebi Jews, who lived in North Africa in the Middle Ages
- North African Sephardi Jews, who migrated from Spain to North Africa around 1500
- Alexandrian Jews, who lived in Egypt until the 1960s
