= Matityahu (Israeli settlement) =

Israeli settlement in the West Bank

Matityahu: מַתִּתְיָהוּ (Hebrew)
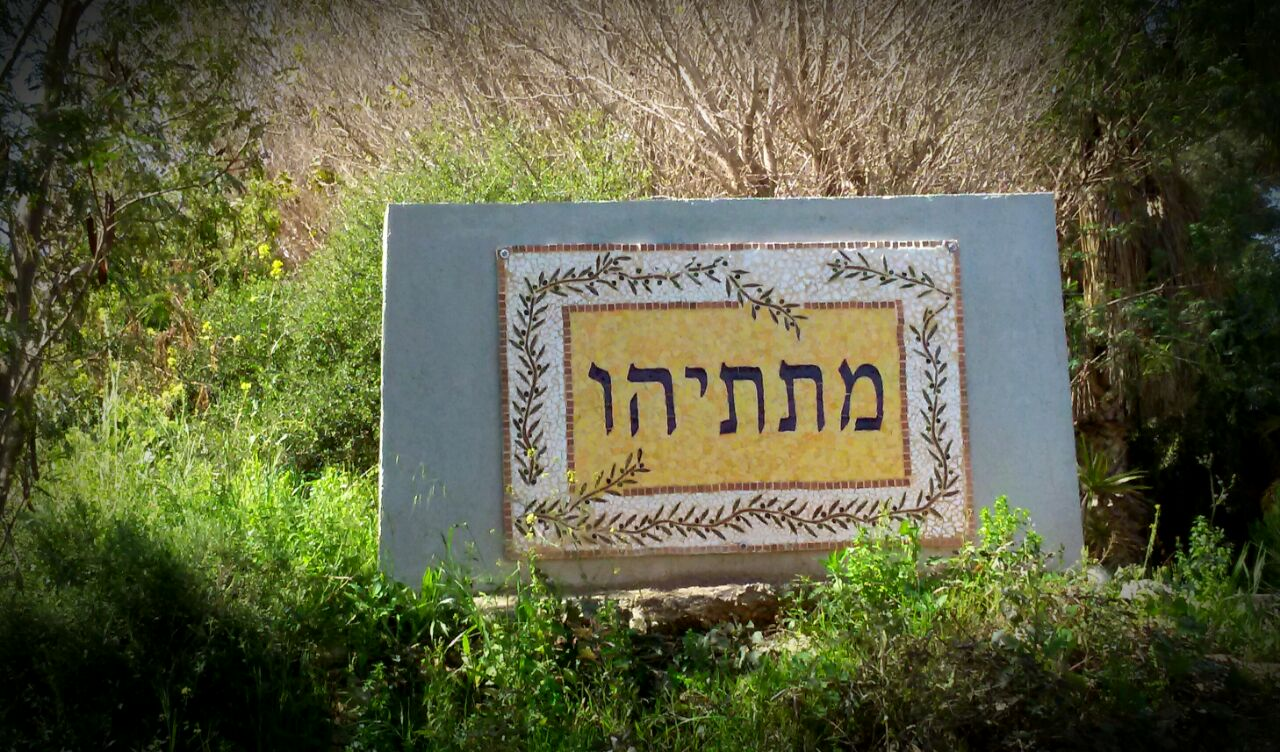

- Location within the Central West Bank
- Coordinates: 31°55′47″N 35°2′4″E
- Country: Palestine
- District: Judea and Samaria Area
- Council: Mateh Binyamin
- Region: West Bank
- Affiliation: Poalei Agudat Yisrael
- Founded: 1981
- Founder: English-speaking immigrants
- Population (2024): 1,119

Matityahu (Hebrew: מַתִּתְיָהוּ) is an Israeli settlement organized as a community settlement in the West Bank. Located approximately midway between Jerusalem and Tel Aviv, near the settlement of Modi'in Illit and the city of Modi'in-Maccabim-Re'ut. It is named after Matityahu the Hasmonean, who lived in Modi'in (1 Maccabees 2:15-17). It falls under the jurisdiction of Mateh Binyamin Regional Council. In 2024 it had a population of 1,119.

Matityahu was initially founded in 1981 by a group of English-speaking immigrants from the United States and elsewhere, and it is now home to a community of observant Jewish families. Matityahu vineyards sell grapes to Israeli winemakers. The community also has agricultural fields operated by independent contractors and rental properties in its commercial park.

The international community considers Israeli settlements in the West Bank illegal under international law, but the Israeli government disputes this.

== Location and climate ==
Matityahu is located in the foothills of the Judean Mountains of the West Bank, administered by the Matte Binyamin Regional Council. Matityahu is adjacent to the rapidly expanding Haredi city of Modi'in Illit and is across the highway from the community of Hashmonaim. Other towns in the immediate vicinity include Lapid, Kfar HaOranim, Kfar Ruth, and Shilat. Situated 286 metres (938 ft) above sea level, Matityahu's climate is temperate. Summer temperatures range between 28 and 35 °C (82 and 95 °F) during the day, with approximately 65% humidity during the hottest summer days. Winters are mostly mild, with frequent rain and seldom any snow.

== History ==
According to ARIJ, Israel confiscated 645 dunams of land from the Palestinian town of Ni'lin in order to construct Matityahu.

As of 2017, Matityahu consists of about 120 families and is expanding with the construction of dozens of new single-family homes. Of the current resident families, about half speak English at home (the others are primarily Hebrew-speaking). There is a wide range of ages – from families with parents in their twenties to great-grandparents. Several households consist of parents who themselves grew up in Matityahu.

A centrally important aspect of Matityahu is that it is a Litvish community with one rabbi and one synagogue. It is required that every family accepts Rabbi Zev Leff's (the community rabbi) da'at torah and halakhic rulings for all matters that may impact on others and respect the "united community" aspect of life in the community. Therefore, all residents are expected to be religiously observant and strict religious standards are demanded including a ban on television and videos. All homes are required to follow the kashrut standards set by Leff and women must dress with complete adherence to the specific tzniut standards. A significant number of men study Torah full-time in a kollel. The general philosophy of Matityahu differs from that of mainstream Israeli Haredi communities in a few key ways. Examples of these differences include readily accepting men who work in full-time jobs, allowing those who wish to acknowledge Independence Day to do so, and not demanding that men dress only in white shirts, jackets, and hats (although many do).
