= Rosh yeshiva =

Head of a yeshiva

Rosh yeshiva or Rosh Hayeshiva (Hebrew: ראש ישיבה, pl. Hebrew: ראשי ישיבה, roshei yeshiva, rashe yeshiva; Anglicized pl. rosh yeshivas) is the title given to the dean of a yeshiva, a Jewish educational institution that focuses on the study of traditional religious texts, primarily the Talmud and the Torah, and halakha (Jewish law).

The general role of the rosh yeshiva is to oversee the Talmudic studies and practical matters. The rosh yeshiva will often give the highest shiur (class) and is also the one to decide whether to grant permission for students to undertake classes for rabbinical ordination, known as semicha.

The term is a compound of the Hebrew words rosh ("head") and yeshiva (a school of religious Jewish education). The rosh yeshiva is required to have a comprehensive knowledge of the Talmud and the ability to analyse and present new perspectives, called chidushim (novellae) verbally and often in print.

In some institutions, such as YU's Rabbi Isaac Elchanan Theological Seminary, the title of rosh yeshiva is given to many rabbis and the dean of the yeshiva is known as the rosh ha-yeshiva.

== Role ==
The primary role of the rosh yeshiva is not simply to be the dean, but is generally to give the highest-level lecture in the yeshiva, which is usually a program of at least two years. Students who have studied in a yeshiva are generally known as "students of the Rosh Yeshiva", as their lecture is the one in which they usually attain their method of Talmudic analysis and critical reasoning, and this method is based on the particular style of that rosh yeshiva.

In addition, since yeshivas play a central role in the life of certain communities within Orthodox Judaism, the position of rosh yeshiva is more than just the position within the yeshiva. A rosh yeshiva is often seen as a pillar of leadership in extended communities.

In Hasidic Judaism, the role of rosh yeshiva is secondary to the Rebbe, who is head of the Hasidic dynasty that controls it. In many Hasidic groups, the rosh yeshiva of a school will be the son or son-in-law of the rebbe, the assumed heir of the rebbe. However, the role that yeshivahs have within Hasidic communities is not nearly as important as it is in Lithuanian Jewish (Litvishe) communities. Hasidic students usually get married at the age of 18, which—in most cases—is the end of their yeshiva education. Students in the Lithuanian Jewish communities typically continue to study until they get married starting at around age 23, with the vast majority continuing their studies in a kollel after marriage. As a result, the role that a rosh yeshiva plays in Lithuanian Jewish communities is much more important than in the Hasidic ones.

== History ==
Yeshivas continue the scholarly traditions of the sages of the Mishnah and Talmud who often headed academies with hundreds of students. In the Talmudic academies in Babylonia, the rosh yeshiva was referred to as the reish metivta ("head of the academy" in Aramaic) and had the title of gaon. Regard for the rosh yeshiva in many ways is the transplantation of Hasidic attitudes in the Lithuanian world.

== Dynasties ==
Depending on the size of the yeshiva, there may be several rosh yeshivas, sometimes from one extended family. There are familial dynasties of rosh yeshivas, for example, the Soloveitchik, Finkel, Feinstein, Kotler, and Kook families, which head many yeshivas in the United States and Israel.

== Famous rosh yeshivas ==
Prior to the Holocaust, most of the large yeshivas were based in Eastern Europe. Presently, the majority of the world's yeshivas and their rosh yeshivas are located in the United States and Israel.

The following is a list of some famous rosh yeshivas:

- Yaakov Ades
- Ezra Attiya
- Chaim Yehuda Leib Auerbach
- Shlomo Zalman Auerbach
- Leib Bakst
- Naftali Zvi Yehuda Berlin
- Avraham Yitzchak Bloch
- Moshe Mordechai Epstein
- Moshe Feinstein
- Eliezer Yehuda Finkel
- Nosson Tzvi Finkel
- Chaim Flom
- Mordechai Gifter
- Refael Reuvain Grozovsky
- Chaim Yaakov Goldvicht
- Eliezer Gordon
- Nachman Shlomo Greenspan
- Shlomo Heiman
- Pinchas Hirschprung
- Yitzchok Hutner
- Yisrael Meir Kagan
- Yaakov Kamenetsky
- Abraham Isaac Kook
- Zvi Yehuda Kook
- Aharon Kotler
- Shneur Kotler
- Malkiel Kotler
- Boruch Ber Leibowitz
- Aharon Lichtenstein
- Dov Linzer
- Eliezer Melamed
- Isser Zalman Meltzer
- M.M. Minshky
- Avigdor Nebenzahl
- Yerucham Olshin
- Avraham Yaakov Pam
- Yisroel Yitzchok Piekarski
- Shmuel Rozovsky
- Yaakov Yitzchok Ruderman
- Yisroel Salanter
- Yechezkel Sarna
- Hershel Schachter
- Aaron Schechter
- Gedalia Schorr
- Elazar Shach
- Moshe Shmuel Shapira
- Meir Shapiro
- Naftoli Shapiro
- Shimon Shkop
- Chaim Shmuelevitz
- Joseph B. Soloveitchik
- Adin Steinsaltz
- Naftoli Trop
- Chaim Volozhin
- Elchonon Wasserman
- Yechiel Yaakov Weinberg
- Ezra Schochet
- Henoch Leibowitz

== Rosh mesivta ==
The title rosh mesivta (alt. rosh metivta) has a long history, going back many centuries. The role is comparable to a dean in a university.

== Mashgiach Ruchani ==
The personal and ethical development of the students in the yeshiva is usually covered by a different personality, known as the mashgiach or spiritual supervisor. This concept, introduced by the Mussar movement in the 19th century, led to perfection of character as one of the aims of attending a yeshiva. One typical and influential mashgiach was Eliyahu Eliezer Dessler.

== See ==
- Yeshivish
- List of yeshivos in Europe (before World War II)
