= Chofetz Chaim (disambiguation) =

Chofetz Chaim is a book written by Rabbi Yisrael Meir Kagan about the Jewish laws regarding harmful speech.

Chofetz Chaim (Hebrew: חָפֵץ חַיִּים, sometimes styled Hafetz Haim) may also refer to:

- Rabbi Israel Meir Kagan, often known by the name of his famous book instead of his given name

== Yeshivos ==
- Yeshiva Chofetz Chaim of Radin, a Suffern, New York
- Yeshivas Chofetz Chaim or Yeshivas Rabbeinu Yisrael Meir HaKohen / Rabbinical Seminary of America, Queens, New York
  - Talmudical Institute of Upstate New York (known as Yeshivas Chofetz Chaim of Rochester), an affiliate of Yeshivas Rabbeinu Yisrael Meir HaKohen
- Yeshiva Chofetz Chaim of Baltimore; see Zelig Pliskin

== Other ==
- Chofetz Chaim Heritage Foundation, an American organisation dedicated to spreading the teachings of the Chofetz Chaim book and its author
- Hafetz Haim, a kibbutz in Israel
