= Chofetz Chaim Heritage Foundation =

Orthodox Jewish organization

The Chofetz Chaim Heritage Foundation (established in 1989) is a non-profit Orthodox Jewish organization based in Monsey, New York, United States. The foundation is dedicated to spreading the teachings of Rabbi Israel Meir Kagan, known as the Chofetz Chaim ( חָפֵץ חַיִּים "Seeker of Life" in Hebrew) and is based on his work of Jewish ethics of the same name. Kagan’s work deals with the prohibitions of gossip, slander and defamation, which are known as Lashon Hara in Jewish law (Halakha).

Its Shmiras Halashon programs are in various Orthodox Jewish high schools, primarily those attended by girls.

== See also ==
- Chofetz Chaim (disambiguation).
