= Zelig Pliskin =

American rabbi, author, psychologist

Joshua Zelig Pliskin (Yiddish: זעליג פליסקין) is an Orthodox Jewish rabbi, writer, lecturer, and author of more than 25 books, including Gateway to Happiness, Conversations With Yourself, Building Your Self-Image and the Self-Image of Others, and Life Is Now.

== Early years ==
Pliskin was born in 1946 in Baltimore, Maryland. As a young boy he attended Yeshiva Chofetz Chaim Talmudical Academy of Baltimore and later studied at the Telshe Yeshiva in Cleveland, Ohio. After his marriage to Raizel, they moved to Israel and he studied for five years at a Brisk yeshiva. He received his degree in Counseling Psychology at the State University of New York.

== Becoming an author ==
Pliskin's father, Rabbi Shmuel Pliskin, had been a student of Israel Meir Kagan, popularly known as the Chofetz Chaim, at the Raduń Yeshiva in Poland and had written a Yiddish-language biography of him, Der Chofetz Chayim: Zine Leben un Shafen (Warsaw, 1936). In 1974, after writing an article for The Jewish Observer about the life of the Chofetz Chaim, "The Profile of an Oheiv Yisroel," Zelig Pliskin was asked to write a book explaining the Chofetz Chaim's teachings. The result was his first book, Guard Your Tongue.

== Current work ==
After Pliskin's move to Israel, the outreach organization Aish HaTorah asked him to speak on human emotions and relationships. Pliskin now provides marriage counseling and works with individuals to encourage their personal growth and improvement. He remains closely affiliated with Aish HaTorah, and lectures both in Israel and in the United States.

== Philosophy ==
The focus of Pliskin's teachings is helping people improve themselves and find happiness. He maintains that there are four basic aspects that make up who we are and who we are becoming:

- state of mind
- self image
- personality traits
- goals

Most important, Pliskin believes, is that we maintain a positive state of mind, allowing us "to be productive and reach our full potential, achieve our goals and bring out the best in others."

== Personal life ==
Pliskin lives in Jerusalem with his family.
