= Fasting during Ramadan =

Religious practice in Islam

During the entire month of Ramadan, Muslims are obligated to fast (Arabic: صوم, sawm; Persian: روزہ, rozeh), every day from dawn to sunset. Fasting requires the abstinence from sex, food, drinking, and smoking. Fasting the month of Ramadān was made obligatory (wājib) during the month of Sha'ban, in the second year after the Muslims migrated from Mecca to Medina. Fasting for the month of Ramadan is one of the Five Pillars of Islam.

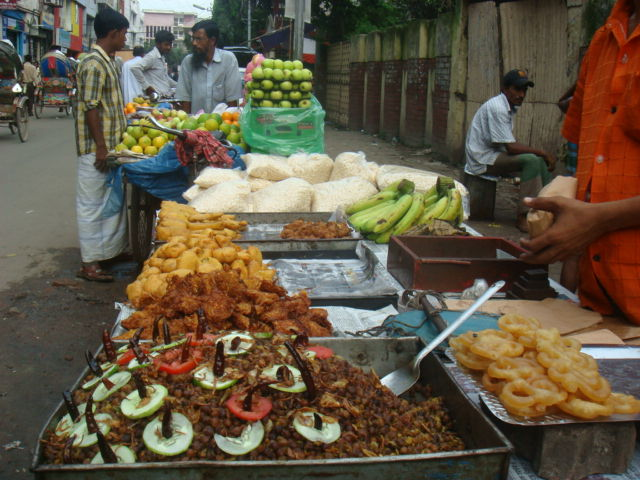
During the break of fasting (Iftar) food vendors selling delicacies in a bazaar in Bangladesh

== The Qur'an ==
Fasting during the month of Ramadan is specifically mentioned in four verses of the Qur'an:

O you who believe! Fasting is prescribed to you as it was prescribed to those before you, that you may (learn) self-restraint.

—Surah al-Baqarah 183

(Fasting) for a fixed number of days; but if any of you is ill, or on a journey, the prescribed number (Should be made up) from days later. For those who can do it (With hardship), is a ransom, the feeding of one that is indigent. But he that will give more, of his own free will,- it is better for him. And it is better for you that you fast, if you only knew.

—Surah al-Baqarah 184

Ramadan is the month in which the Quran was revealed as a guide for humanity with clear proofs of guidance and the decisive authority. So whoever is present this month, let them fast. But whoever is ill or on a journey, then let them fast an equal number of days after Ramadan. Allah intends ease for you, not hardship, so that you may complete the prescribed period and proclaim the greatness of Allah for guiding you, and perhaps you will be grateful.

-Surah al-Baqarah 185

It has been made permissible for you to be intimate with your wives during the nights preceding the fast. Your spouses are a garment for you as you are for them. Allah knows that you were deceiving yourselves. So He has accepted your repentance and pardoned you. So now you may be intimate with them and seek what Allah has prescribed for you. You may eat and drink until you see the light of dawn breaking the darkness of night, then complete the fast until nightfall. Do not be intimate with your spouses while you are meditating in the mosques. These are the limits set by Allah, so do not exceed them. This is how Allah makes His revelations clear to people, so they may become mindful of Him.

-Surah al-Baqarah 187

== Prohibitions during Ramadan ==
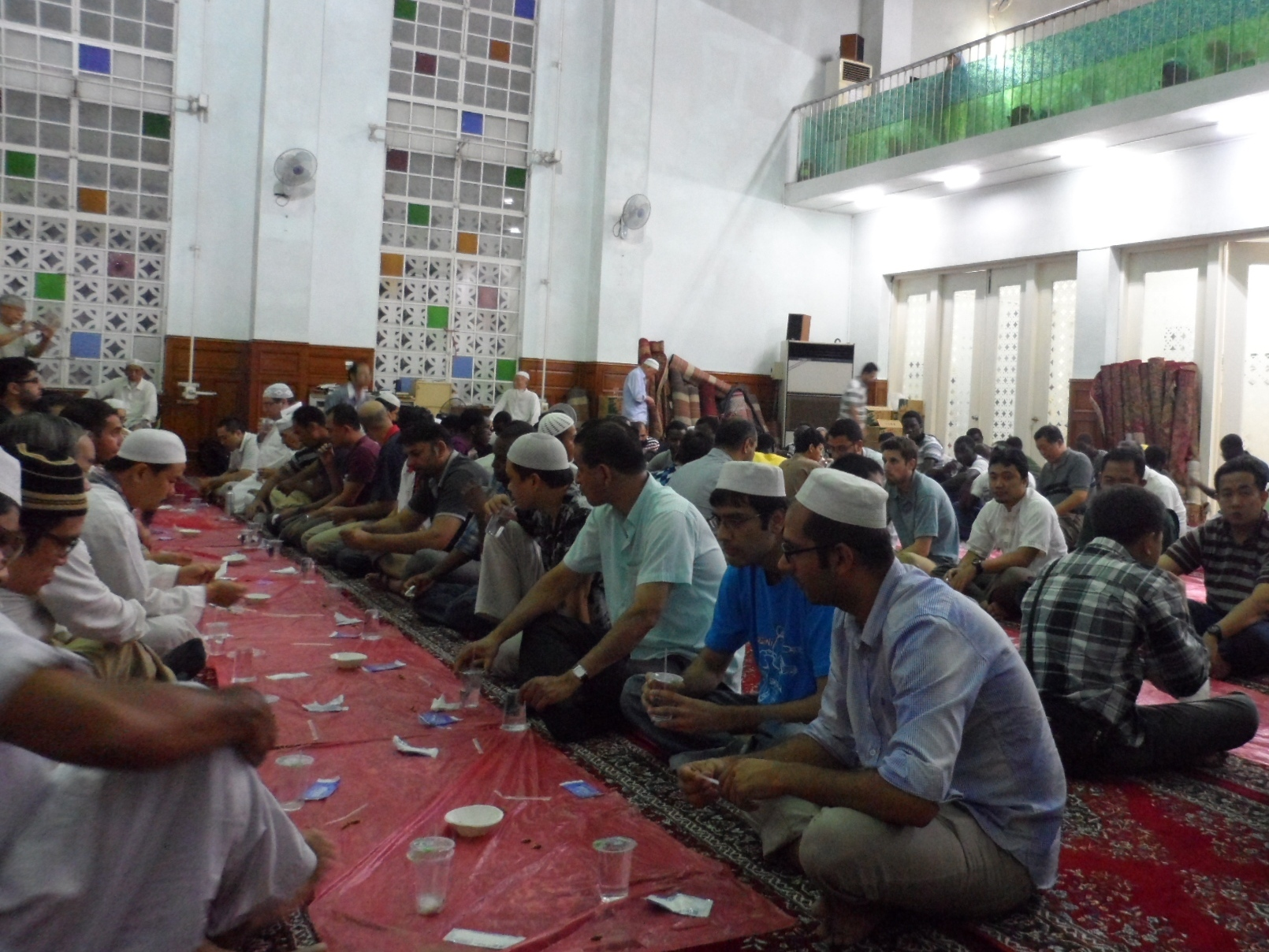
Fast break at Taipei Grand Mosque in Taiwan

Eating, drinking, and sexual activities are not allowed between dawn (fajr), and sunset (maghrib). Fasting is considered an act of deeply personal worship in which Muslims seek a raised level of closeness to God. It helps them acknowledge Allah as the supposed source of all sustenance.

During Ramadan, Muslims are also expected to put more effort into following the teachings of Islam by refraining from violence, anger, envy, greed, lust, angry/sarcastic retorts, gossip, and are meant to try to get along with each other better than normal. All obscene and irreligious stimuli are to be avoided as the purity of both thought and action is important. This supposedly helps them develop a higher conscience of mindfulness of Allah.

=== Exceptions ===
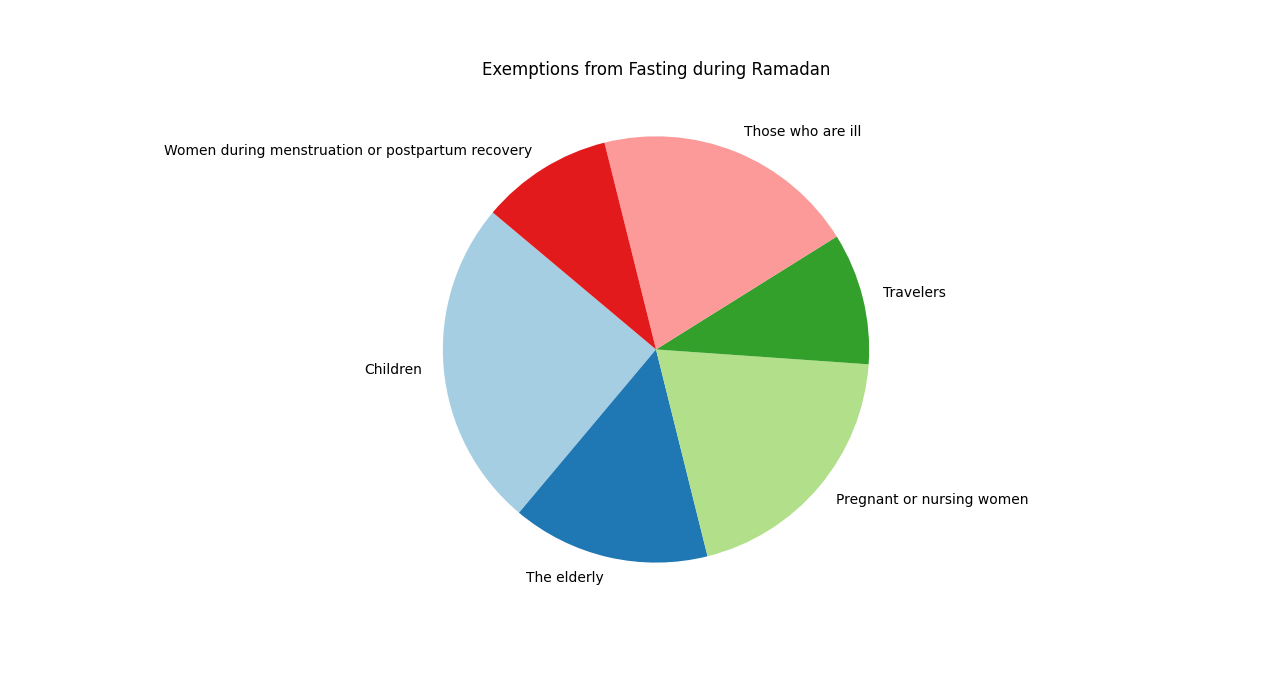
Categories of people with exemptions from Fasting during Ramadan

Although fasting in Ramadan is fard (obligatory), exceptions are made for persons in particular circumstances. Fasting during Ramadan is not obligatory for several groups for whom it would be excessively problematic, among them people with medical conditions.

Pre-pubescent children are not required to fast, though some choose to do so, and some small children fast for half a day to train themselves. If puberty is delayed, fasting becomes obligatory after a certain age. Diabetics and nursing or pregnant people are usually not expected to fast. According to a hadith, observing the Ramadan fast is forbidden for women who are menstruating.

Other individuals for whom it is usually considered acceptable not to fast are those in battle, and travellers who either intend to spend more than five days away from home or travel more than 50 miles. If the circumstance preventing fasting is temporary, a person is required to make up for the missed days after the month of Ramadan is over and before the next Ramadan arrives. Should the circumstance be permanent or present for an extended amount of time, one may recompense by feeding a needy person for every day missed.

If one does not fit into any category of exemption and breaks the fast out of forgetfulness, the fast is still valid. Intentionally breaking the fast voids it, and the person must make up for the entire day later. One must either fast for 60 days after Ramadan or feed 60 people in need (according to the Hanafi school) and fast one day extra.

During a 2013 poliomyelitis outbreak in Somalia, some groups of aid workers were granted an exemption for the oral polio vaccine.

Other exemptions include:

- An elderly person who is not physically able to fast. They should donate the amount of a normal person's diet for each day missed if they are financially capable.
- Serious illness; the days lost to illness will have to be made up after recovery.
- Those with a mental disability that is enough to cloud judgment.

== Breaking the fast ==
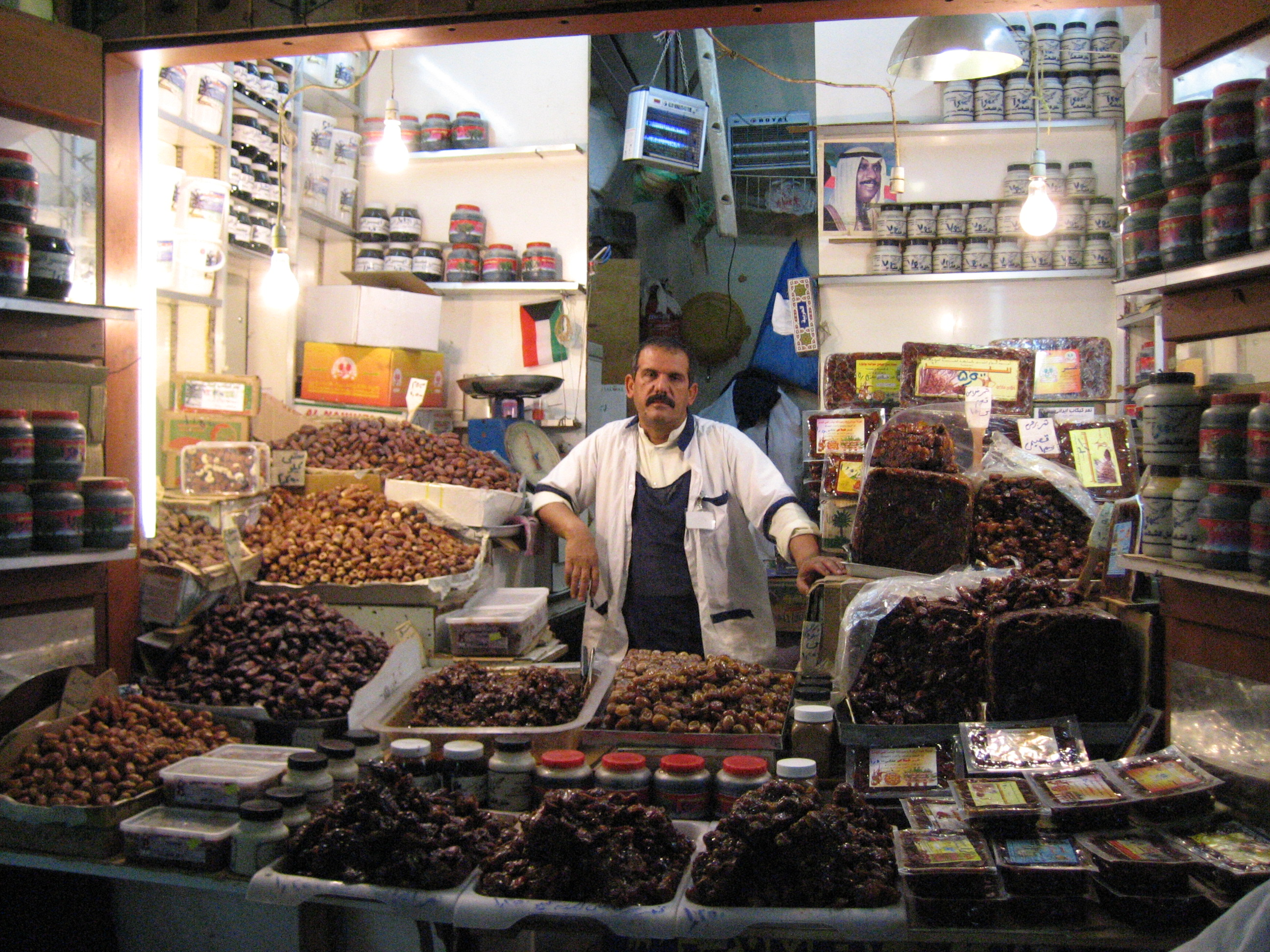
Muslims traditionally break the fast with dates (like these on sale in Kuwait City), as was the recorded practice (Sunnah) of Muhammad.

Many mosques will provide iftar (literally: breakfast) meals after sundown for the community to come and end their day's fasting as a whole. It is also common for such meals to take place at Muslim soup kitchens. The fast is broken with a date (when possible) following the tradition of Muhammad, or with water.

== Ramadan Iftar Dua ==
Ramadan fast is broken by reciting iftar dua:

ذَهَبَ الظَّمَأُ وَابْتَلَّتِ الْعُرُوقُ وَثَبَتَ الأَجْرُ إِنْ شَاءَ اللَّهُ Dhahabadh dhama-u, wabtallatil ‘urooqu, wa thabatal ajru in-shaa-Allah.
Meaning: “Thirst has gone, the arteries are moist, and the reward is sure, if Allah wills.”

== Health effects ==
Ramadan fasting is safe for healthy people, provided that overall food and water intake is adequate, but those with medical conditions should seek medical advice if they encounter health problems before or during fasting. The fasting period is usually associated with significant weight loss for both males and females, though the weight usually returns without further lifestyle modifications.

A review of the literature by an Iranian group suggested fasting during Ramadan might produce renal injury in patients with moderate (GFR <60 ml/min) or severe kidney disease but was not injurious to renal transplant patients with good function or most stone-forming patients. Also, it was suggested that Ramadan fasting may increase the risk for salivary gland inflammation.

The psychological effects of fasting during Ramadan have also been researched. In one study, Ramadan fasters were asked to perform cognitive inhibition tasks during and after Ramadan, assessing their response time and accuracy. Just before starting the task, half of the participants were asked a few questions about food (Food-reminded), whereas the other half were asked about ownership at various times (Control). Results showed that participants who were reminded of food were slower and less accurate during Ramadan compared to after Ramadan. Control participants, however, performed similarly across time. The researchers examined whether performances varied during Ramadan depending on the time of people’s last meal. They found that within the first few hours of their last meal (eight hours), food-reminded people had longer inhibition delays than Control participants, yet after eight hours, the two groups similarly slowed down. Nonetheless, both groups responded more accurately the longer time had passed since their last meal. This research indicates that (a) cognitive control processes are engaged from the early hour of the fast, and susceptible to manipulation, and (b) after a few hours into the fast, regardless of whether they have been reminded of food or not, people take longer to distinguish between correct and incorrect responses, yet respond more accurately.

== Rulings for a fasting person ==
Linguistically, the word fasting in the Arabic language means unconditional 'restraint' (imsak) from any action or speech during any time. According to the Sacred Law, fasting is the act of:

1. refraining from entering anything into the body cavity;
2. refraining from engaging in sexual activity;
3. refraining from immoral acts such as backbiting;
4. from the time the sun begins to rise to the time the sun sets;

'Refraining from engaging in sexual activity' includes actual sexual intercourse and ejaculation caused by foreplay. 'Refraining from entering anything into the body cavity' refers to the acts of entering food, drink, or medicine into the body cavity, regardless of whether this is a typical item one would enter into the body cavity or not. Entering any of these substances inside the body cavity means that the substance enters into the throat, the intestines, the stomach, or the brain by way of the nose, the throat, the genitals or anus, or open wounds. 'Whether deliberately or accidentally' excludes forgetful acts of eating, drinking, or sexual activity. 'From the time the sun begins to rise to the time the sun sets' refers to the true entering of the Fajr time to the entering of the Maghrib time. 'Accompanied with the intention of fasting' means that one must intend to fast in order to distinguish if one is really performing an act of worship or not when one refrains from eating, drinking, or having sexual intercourse. For example, if one were to merely stay away from food, drink, or sexual activity without an intention to fast, then this fast is not valid and does not count. 'From individuals who are permitted to fast' means that one must be free from a situation that would prevent the validity of one's fast, such as menstruation or lochia (post-natal bleeding).[Shurunbulali, Maraqi al-Falah; Ala al-Din Abidin, al-Hadiyya al-Alaiyya; Shurunbulali Imdad al-Fattah]. Apart from sexual intercourse either with spouse or anyone, masturbation is also strictly prohibited while fasting. This act will invariably break the fast, and the person who committed this act will have to repent to Allah and should make up this fast on a later date.

== Sectarian differences ==
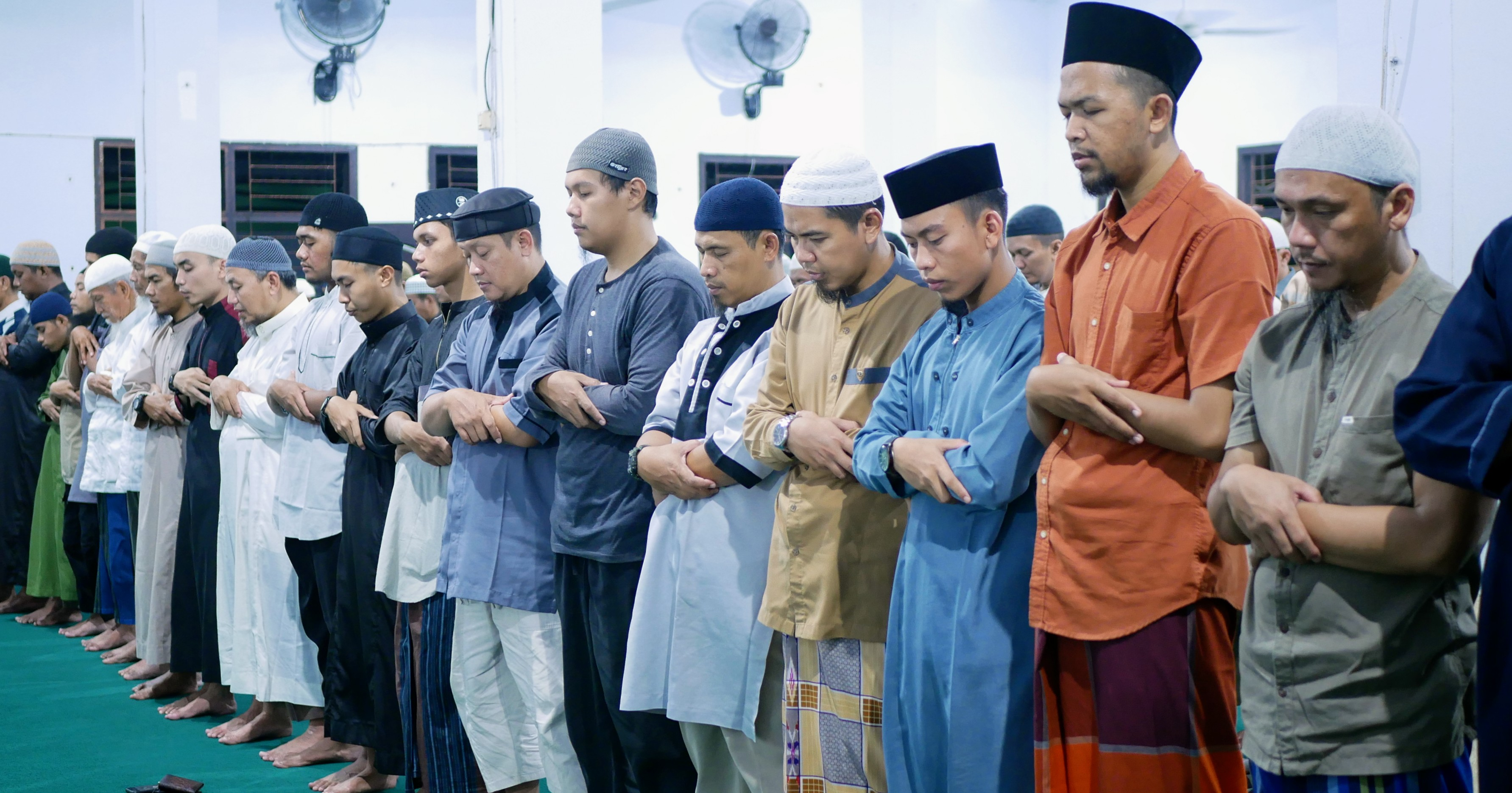
Muslims praying the night prayers during Ramadan

For the most part, Sunnis and Shias observe Ramadan the same way, but there are some differences. For one, Sunnis break their fast at sunset, once the sun is no longer visible, but there is still light in the sky. However, for Shias they wait to break after it gets completely dark. Shia Muslims also observe additional events that Sunnis do not. They mourn for three days (on the 19th, 20th, and 21st) to commemorate Ali, the son in law of Muhammad and first Imam of the Shia, who was assassinated by Abd al-Rahman ibn Muljam.

Sufi Muslims have some variations on how they observe Ramadan and what it means to them. They follow the same rules when fasting, but they recite extra prayers at midnight. The practice they do is called Dhikr, where they chant God’s name 99 times. This is done because they want to show their love for God and seek a personal relationship with God, as opposed to fearing God's wrath.

== Eid al-Fitr ==
The Islamic holiday of Eid al-Fitr (Arabic: عيد الفطر) marks the end of the Islamic fasting of the month of Ramadan.

== In China ==
The government of the People's Republic of China has prohibited Uyghur Muslims from fasting during Ramadan in Xinjiang. The prohibitions are couched in terms of protecting Uyghurs' "free will".
