= World War II posters from the Soviet Union =

Soviet propaganda posters

A Soviet war poster by Nina Vatolina conveying the message: "Don't chatter! Gossiping borders on treason" (1941).

Soviet posters during the Eastern Front were visual aids meant to elaborate a certain point in an accessible form, such as the attitudes of the Soviet Government to current events taking place at the front, prevention of defeatism and pessimism, or the inspiration of the troops and the people. The Soviet posters of World War II are works of art and reflect elements of the Soviet cultural heritage. Such posters were often displayed at special stands, referred to as "windows of TASS".

Posters differed both on workmanship and the form. Some were crude caricatures, while others were paintings on military topics or popular photos, presented with an explanation of an event, a quote from the works of Vladimir Lenin or Joseph Stalin, or a poetic comment.

== Popular themes ==
"Motherland calls!"
The first and the most famous Soviet poster of the Second World War. The text on the sheet in the Motherland hand is the Red Army oath.

"For the Motherland, for Stalin!
The official war-cry of the Red Army during the Second World War

Who cometh to us with a sword by the sword shall die
Quotation ascribed to the Prince of Novgorod Alexander Nevsky who repelled Livonian Knights intrusion into Russia in 1242.

Soldier beats the enemy in hand-to-hand combat
"In the skies, on the land, in the seas!"

German tank will not pass here!

Once again, we will fight off the enemy
Usually referencing Napoleon, but also referencing the Livonian Knights intrusions and the Russian Civil War after the First World War.

I wait for you, liberator!
Russian child-prisoner of a Nazi extermination camp. Other name of this poster is "Red Army warrior, rescue me!"

Death to the baby-killers

Caricature
"Adolf, you can not."

Dynamic portrait
"We are drinking the water of our native Dnieper. We will drink the water of the Prut, the Neman, the Bug River. Cleanse the native land of the Nazi vermin!"

Raise the Victory Banner in Berlin!
Red Army marching in Berlin and the Allied countries flags on the Brandenburg Gate

== See also ==
- Lord Kitchener Wants You
- Uncle Sam
