= Backbiting =

Secret slander

1868 allegory of backbiting based on Psalms, "the wicked bend their bow, they make ready their arrow upon the string, that they may privily shoot at the upright in heart" (11:2) and "their tongue a sharp sword" (57:4)"

Backbiting or tale-bearing is to slander someone in their absence — to bite them behind their back. Originally, backbiting referred to an unsporting attack from the rear in the blood sport of bearbaiting.

== Causes ==
Backbiting may occur as a form of release after a confrontation. By insulting the opposing person, the backbiter diminishes them and, by doing so, restores their own self-esteem. A bond may also be established with the confidante if they are receptive to the hostile comment. Such gossip is common in human society as people seek to divert blame and establish their place in the dominance hierarchy. But the backbiting may be perceived as a form of delinquent behaviour due to an inferiority complex.

== Religious views ==
In most major religions, backbiting is considered a sin. Leaders of the Baháʼí Faith condemned it as the worst of sins as it destroyed the 'life of the soul' and provoked divine wrath. In Buddhism, backbiting goes against the ideal of right speech. Saint Thomas Aquinas classified it as a mortal sin, given that, as with other mortal sins, the act attains its perfection, that is, the act is committed with full knowledge and full consent of the will. Islam considers ghibah, or backbiting, to be a major sin and the Qur'an compares it to the abhorrent act of eating the flesh of one's dead brother. Additionally, it is not permissible for one to keep quiet and listen to backbiting. In Judaism, backbiting is known as hotzaat shem ra (spreading a bad name) and is considered a severe sin.

In the 19th century, Charlotte Elizabeth wrote an account of backbiting for the moral education of children in places such as Sunday school.

== Notable examples ==
In the Book of Numbers, the elder siblings of Moses – Miriam and Aaron – talk against him together. God is angered and punishes Miriam with leprosy.

Gordon Brown notoriously spoke of Gillian Duffy as being a "sort of bigoted woman" after conversing with her pleasantly during his 2010 election campaign. This remark was made to his staff as he was driving away but was picked up by a live microphone. This incident caused him great embarrassment and he returned to apologise, declaring that he was a "penitent sinner."
