= Mishnah Berurah =

Book by Yisrael Meir ha-Kohen Kagan

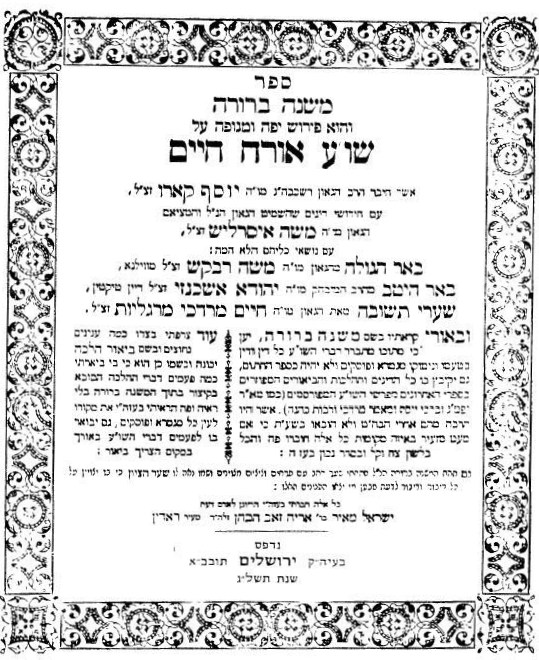
- Author: Rabbi Yisrael Meir Kagan
- Original title: משנה ברורה
- Language: Hebrew
- Original text: משנה ברורה at Hebrew Wikisource

The Mishnah Berurah (Hebrew: משנה ברורה "Clear Teaching") is a work of halakha (Jewish law) by Rabbi Yisrael Meir Kagan (Poland, 1838–1933, also known as Chofetz Chaim). It is a commentary on Orach Chayim, the first section of the Shulchan Aruch which deals with laws of prayer, synagogue, Shabbat and holidays, summarizing the opinions of the Acharonim (post-Medieval rabbinic authorities) on that work.

The title comes from Talmud Bavli Masechet Shabbat 138b-139a, "They will rove, seeking the word of the LORD, but they will not find it (Amos 8:12) -- they will not find clear teaching and clear law in one place."

== Contents ==
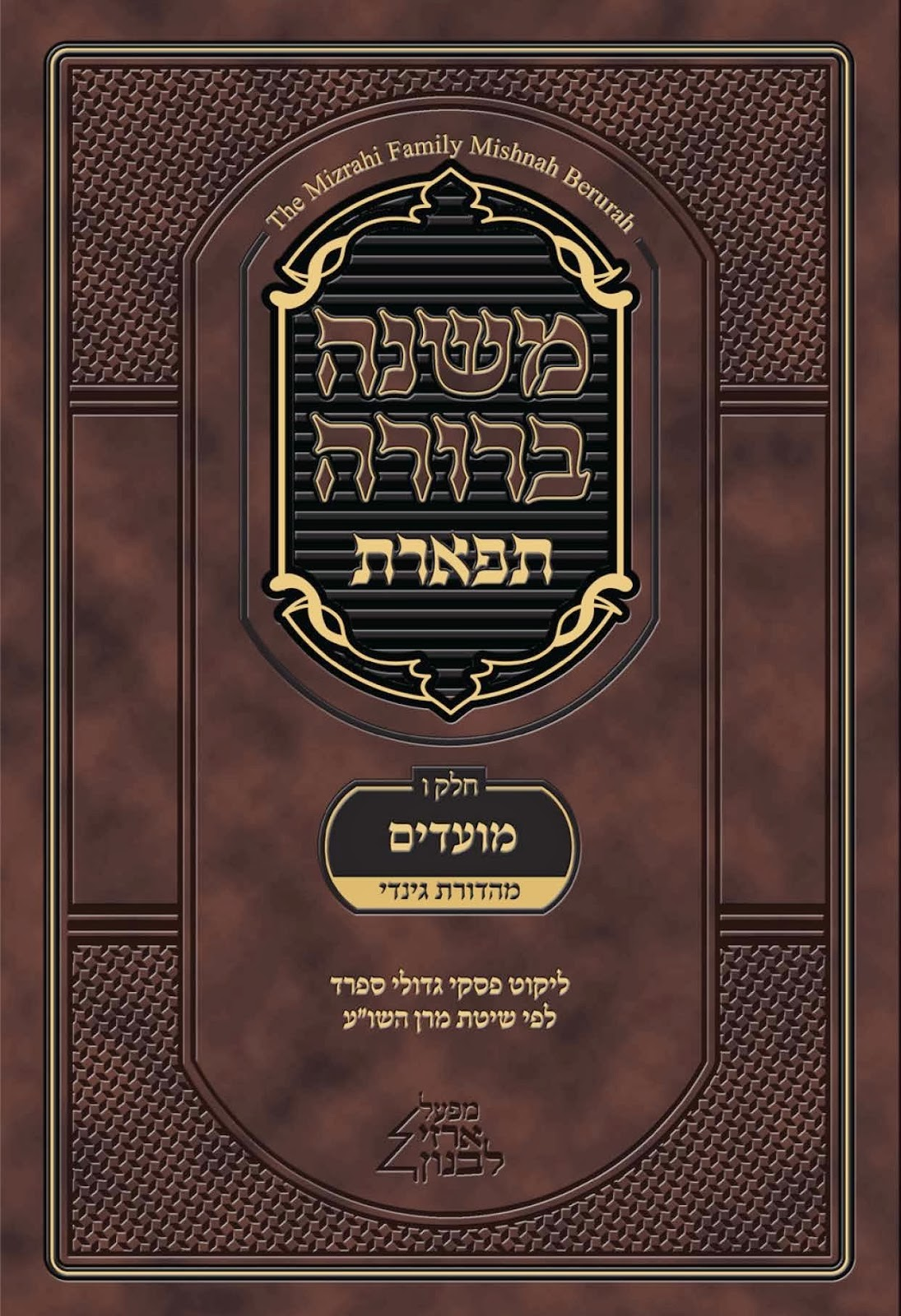
Mishnah Berurah Tiferet, published by Mifal Arzei Levanon, where Sephardic law and customs are included printed

The Mishnah Berurah is traditionally printed in 6 volumes alongside selected other commentaries. The work provides simple and contemporary explanatory remarks and citations to daily aspects of halakha. It is widely used as a reference and has mostly supplanted the Chayei Adam and the Aruch HaShulchan as the primary authority on Jewish daily living among Ashkenazi Jews, particularly those closely associated with haredi yeshivas. The Mishnah Berurah is accompanied by additional in-depth glosses called Be'ur Halakha, a reference section called Sha'ar Hatziyun (these two were also written by the Chofetz Chaim), and additional commentaries called Be'er Hagolah, Be'er Heitev, and Sha'arei Teshuvah.

The Mishnah Berurah's "literary style can be described as follows: In relation to a given law of the Shulhan Aruch, he raises a particular case with certain peculiarities that may change the law; then, he enumerates the opinions of the Ahronim (the later authorities, of the 16th century and on) on that case, from the most lenient to the most stringent; and finally, he decides between them.... Having displayed what we may call the "leniency-stringency spectrum", [he] actually offers the reader an array of conduct options from which he may pick the one that seems right for him. This choice is not altogether free, since [he] shows a clear inclination to one side of the spectrum - the stringent - and encourages the reader to follow it, but still, the soft language of the ruling suggests that if one follows the other side of the spectrum, the lenient, he will not sin, since there are trustworthy authorities that may back his choice."

Not all of the Mishnah Berurah was written by Kagan: some parts were instead written by his son or various students, which accounts for the existence of several contradictions between different rulings in the text.

== Impact ==
Mishnah Berurah has come to play a significant role in the study and practice of contemporary Ashkenazi Orthodox Jews. According to some, it is the "posek acharon" whose rulings are the last word on halachic issues it addresses. As such, the "yeshivish" community tends to follow its rulings almost exclusively. However, R' Yosef Eliyahu Henkin ruled that the Aruch haShulchan should be regarded as more authoritative for a number of reasons: it is the later of the two codes; it covers the entire Shulchan Aruch and not just Orach Chaim; it takes Jewish custom into account; it was written by a practicing rabbi who thus had more experience with halachic dilemmas. R' Moshe Feinstein also preferred the Aruch Hashulchan, for the last of these reasons. Indeed, on a number of key issues, common Orthodox practice does not follow the Mishnah Berurah's stringencies. (Note: For example: it is common to make tea from tea bags on Shabbat, to consume chalav stam, and say "yitgadal veyitkadash" in Kaddish (all of which Mishnah Berurah rules against); and Mishnah Berurah's ruling that girls must fully follow tzniut guidelines from age 3 is not universally followed.)

"Mishnah Berurah Yomit" is a daily study programme initiated by Vaad Daas Halacha and the Chofetz Chaim Heritage Foundation. The study program proceeds either on a 2½-year cycle ("Daf a Day") or a 5-year cycle ("Amud a Day") and includes a focus on each Yom Tov (festival) in the 30 preceding days.

== See also ==
- Chayei Adam, a similar, earlier work
- Aruch HaShulchan by Yechiel Michel Epstein - a contemporaneous work tracing the development of each halakha from the Talmud through the Rishonim and arriving at a psak supported by the Acharonim
- Kaf Hachayim by Yaakov Chaim Sofer - a contemporaneous Sephardi work discussing Orach Chayim and some of Yoreh De'ah in light of the Rishonim and Acharonim.
- Kitzur Shulchan Aruch by Shlomo Ganzfried
- Other study cycles under Torah study#Study cycles
