= Despondence in Islam =

One of the major sins in Islam

Despondence (Arabic: قنوط) is one of the major sins in Islam. Disappointment and its derivatives are mentioned six times in the Quran. In some sources, disappointment and despair are distinguished (Arabic: يأس) and that despondency is tougher than despair.

== Distinctions ==
Disappointment literally means hopelessness. Some philologists distinguish disappointment from despair and have written that despondency is tougher than despair. A ḥadīth of Ali al-Ridha states that despair is the second major sin and disappointment is the third major sin and that they are different. Despair is a feeling that is not expressed. When such a feeling is manifested outwardly and becomes obvious to others, it is said to be disappointment.

== Disappointment in the Quran ==
Disappointment and its derivatives appear six times in the Quran. For example, when the angels gave the good news to Abraham about the birth of his child in his old age, they asked him not to be despondent. In another verse, Allah says: "O creatures of God, those of you who have acted against your own interests should not be disheartened of the mercy of God. Surely God forgives all sins. He is all-forgiving and all-merciful." Other mentions appear in the 36th verse of Ar-Rum, 49th of Fussilat, and 28th verse of Ash-Shura.

== See also ==
- Islamic views on sin
- Ghibah
