= Islamic views on sin =

In Islam, sin (dhanb) is an action violating the laws of God (sharīʿah) and an important subject in Islamic ethics.

The Quran describes sins throughout the texts. Some sins are more grievious than others. Therefore, Muslim scholars (ʿulamāʾ) – theologians and jurists – distinguish between lesser sins (al-Sagha'ir) and greater sins (al-kabīrah). The latter refers to unequivocal actions against God's law, and for which punishment is ordained. Sources differ which sin belongs to which category.

== Terminology ==
A number of different words for sin are used in the Islamic tradition.

According to A. J. Wensinck's entry on the topic in the Encyclopedia of Islam, Islamic terms for sin include dhanb and khaṭīʾa, which are synonymous and refer to intentional sins; khiṭʾ, which means simply a sin; and ithm, which is used for grave sins.

According to Cyril Glasse, Islam recognizes two kinds of sin (khati'ah): dhanb, a fault or shortcoming which is to be sanctioned; and ithm, a willful transgression which is to be punished.

== In scriptures ==
=== Semantic analysis of terminology in the Quran ===
Several different words are used in the Quran to describe sin—1) Dhanb 2) Ithm 3) Khati'ah 4) Jurm 5) Junah/Haraj. By examining the choice of words in Quranic verses used in connection with these terms, scholars have attempted to determine which sins are associated with which terms.

==== Dhanb ====
Dhanb (plural dhunub) is frequently applied to heinous sins committed against God. One of the main examples of Dhanb in the Quran is of "crying lies of Allah's signs", or having excessive pride that prevents an individual from believing the signs of God.

For in Allah's sight are (all) his servants, (namely), those who say: 'Our Lord, we have indeed believed: forgive us, then, our sins ("dhunub"), and save us from the agony of the Fire.'

— Quran 3:15–16

This use of dhanb in the Quran exemplifies that this type of sin is punishable in the afterlife. In fact, dhanb is considered a 'great' sin and is often used in the Quran to contrast with sayyi'a, which denotes a 'smaller' sin. The Quran states that if you avoid these great sins, your lesser evil deeds or sayyi'at will be forgiven.

If you avoid major sins (kaba'ir or dhanb) which are forbidden to you, We will remit you from your evil deeds (sayyi'a).

— Quran 4:31

==== Ithm ====
Some scholars believe the basic meaning of ithm to be an unlawful deed that is committed intentionally. This contrasts to dhanb in that dhanb can be both intentional and unintentional. However, this definition is somewhat nebulous and the best description of the word is based on the contextual situations. In the Quran, ithm is found quite frequently in legislative descriptions. For example, falsely accusing your own wife in order to gain money is constituted as an ithm (Quran 4:24-20). However, ithm is also used in connection with haram, or committing an unlawful deed, a taboo, such as consuming food or drink that is forbidden by God:

They will ask thee about wine and gambling. Say, 'In both of them there is great sin (ithm) and also some uses for men, but their sin is greater than their usefulness.'

— Quran 2:219

Ithm is also associated with what is considered the worst sin of all, shirk. Shirk signifies associating partners with God. The Quran states that:

He who associates with God has surely forged a great sin (ithm).

— Quran 4:53-50

This association with shirk is noteworthy for shirk is considered unforgivable if not repented of.

God forgiveth not (the sin of) joining other gods to Him; but He forgiveth whom He pleaseth other sins that this: one who joins other gods with God hath strayed far, far away.

— Quran 4:116

==== Khati'ah ====
Khati'ah is considered by many scholars to be a "moral lapse" or a "mistake". This interpretation has led some scholars to believe that Khati'ah is a lesser sin than ithm; however, the word Khati'ah is frequently used in conjunction with ithm in the Quran.

Whoso, having committed a khati'ah or an ithm, throws it upon the innocent, has burdened himself with calumny and an obvious sin (ithm).

— Quran 4:112

"Say: "O my Servants who have transgressed against their souls! Despair not of the Mercy of Allah: for Allah forgives all sins: for He is Oft-Forgiving, Most Merciful." Surah Az Zumar, 39:53

Again, God says to the believers in a Hadith Qudsi: "O son of Adam, so long as you call upon Me, and ask of Me, I shall forgive you for what you have done, and I shall not mind. O son of Adam, were your sins to reach the clouds of the sky and were you then to ask forgiveness of Me, I would forgive you. O son of Adam were you to come to Me with sins nearly as great as the earth, and were you then to face Me, ascribing no partner to Me, I would bring you forgiveness nearly as great as it."

This Quranic verse indicates that khati'ah is considered an ithm, a grave sin. In fact, the word khati'ah is associated with some of the most heinous religious sins in the Quran. In one Quranic verse this word is used to describe the sin of slaying one's own children for fear of poverty. (Quran 17:33-31). Scholars believe that dhanb or ithm could be used in place of khati'ah in this instance; however, the word choice indicates that khati'ah is more than just a moral lapse or mistake and is punishable. And all sins are eligible for forgiveness through God's mercy and repentance.

==== Jurm ====
The word Jurum is often considered to be a synonym of dhanb for it is used to describe some of the same sins: crying lies of God and not believing the signs of God. In the Quran, the word mostly appears in the form of mujrim, one who commits a jurm. These individuals are described in the Quran as having arrogance towards the believers.

Behold, those who commit jurm used to laugh at those who believed, knowingly looking at one when they passed them by, and when they went back to their own fold, they returned jesting, and when they saw them they used to say, 'Lo, these have indeed gone astray!

— Quran 83:29–32

==== Junah/Haraj ====
Junah and Haraj have a similar meaning to that of ithm, a sin that warrants a punishment. In fact, these words are used almost interchangeably with ithm in the same chapters in the Quran. Like ithm, these words are found frequently in legislative portions of the Quran, particularly relating to regulations regarding marriage and divorce.

It is no sin (junah) for you that you [indirectly] allude proposal of marriage to (recently widowed (Iddah stage)) women or keep it to yourself.

— Quran 2:235

=== Definition in Hadith ===
Sin is discussed extensively in the hadith, (the collection of Muhammad's sayings). It is reported by An-Nawwas bin Sam'an:

"The Prophet (Muhammad) said, "Piety is good manner, and sin is that which creates doubt and you do not like people to know it."

— Sahih Muslim, 32:6195,Sahih Muslim, 32:6196

Wabisah bin Ma'bad reported:

"I went to Messenger of Allah (SAWS) and he asked me: "Have you come to inquire about piety?" I replied in the affirmative. Then he said: "Ask your heart regarding it. Piety is that which contents the soul and comforts the heart, and sin is that which causes doubts and perturbs the heart, even if people pronounce it lawful and give you verdicts on such matters again and again."

— Ahmad and Ad-Darmi

In Sunan al-Tirmidhi, a Hadith is narrated:

The Prophet (Muhammad) said, "Every son of Adam sins, the best of the sinners are those who repent."

— Sunan al-Tirmidhi, Hadith no. 2499

In Sahih Muslim, Abu Ayyub al-Ansari and Abu Huraira narrated:

The Prophet (Muhammad)," By Him in Whose Hand is my life, if you were not to commit sin, Allah would sweep you out of existence and He would replace (you by) those people who would commit sin and seek forgiveness from Allah, and He would have pardoned them."

— Sahih Muslim, 37:6965

== Opinions of scholars ==
Shaykh Abdur Razzaq Al-Badr said, Ibn Qayyim says: "Sins inevitably take away blessings (niyamah). No servant commits a sin except that a blessing from Allah is taken away from him in proportion to that sin. If he repents and returns to it, it or something similar is returned to him. But if he persists in it, it is not returned to him. Sins continue to take away one blessing after another until all blessings are taken away. Allah the Almighty says: "Indeed, Allah will not change the condition of a people until they change what is in themselves." (Ar-Ra'd: 11) In short, sins are the fire of blessings, devouring them just as fire devours wood."

== Repentance of sin ==
The Islamic concept of repentance for any sins and misdeeds is called tawba. It is a direct matter between a person and God, so there is no intercession or formal, ecclesiastical confession to a religious leader. There is also no concept of original sin in Islam. Islam has no concept of original sin, need for atonement, or ecclesiastical confession. Abu Uthman al-Maghribi argues that sin is better than complacency, since the sinner makes tawba.

Repentance and forgiveness are a direct matter between the individual and God, requiring no intercession. In cases of sin against another person, restitution is required. In cases of sin against God, repentance, remorse, and resolution to change one's behavior are considered sufficient. Although classical scholars emphasized the individual dimension of repentance, many revivalists and reformists have tied individual actions to larger issues of public morality, ethics, and social reform, arguing for reimplementation of the Islamic penal code as public expiation for sins.

Sufis understand repentance as a process of spiritual conversion toward constant awareness of God's presence. Muhammad reputedly requested God's forgiveness several times daily. It is the act of leaving what God has prohibited and returning to what he has commanded. The word denotes the act of being repentant for one's misdeeds, atoning for those misdeeds, and having a strong determination to forsake those misdeeds (remorse, resolution, and repentance). If someone sins against another person, restitution is required.

== Major sins: Al-Kaba'ir ==
The most heinous sins in Islam are known as al-Kaba'ir (Arabic: كبيرة) which translates to the great or major one. Some authors use the term enormity. While every sin is seen as an offense, al-Kaba'ir are the gravest of the offenses. God's power is thought to be only eclipsed by his mercy and thus minor or small sins (al-sagha'ir), are tacitly understood to be forgiven after repentance. Not every sin is equal however and some are thought to be more spiritually hurting than others. The greatest of the sins described as al-Kaba'ir is the association of others with God or Shirk.

Hadiths differ as to how many major sins there are. Different hadith list three, four, or seven great sins. In contrasting major sins with minor sins, the eighth-century Shafi'i scholar al-Dhahabi found the hadith collections of Muhammad al-Bukhari and Muslim ibn al-Hajjaj listed seven major sins. Ibn Ḥajar al-Haythamī (d. 974/1567) found 467 major sins, and "often-quoted definition attributed" to "companion of the prophet" and mufassir Abd Allah ibn Abbas (d. 68/686–8), states that a major sin is "everything for which God has prescribed a fixed punishment (ḥadd) in this world and the Fire in the hereafter", bringing the number closer to seventy major sins.

The Seven Great Sins in Islam are listed as follows:

1. Shirk (reverence due God directed toward those other than God);
2. Committing murder (i.e. taking away someone's life);
3. Taking property of an orphan placed in one's care;
4. Taking or paying interest (riba);
5. Witchcraft (black magic);
6. Turning away on the day of the battle;
7. Accusing chaste women of adultery unjustly.

Other major sins are listed as follows:

1. Leaving off the five daily prayers (Salah);
2. Dishonoring the parents.
3. Not paying the minimum amount of Zakat when the person is required to do so;
4. Not fasting on the days of Ramadan (without a valid reason such as medical, traveling, too young, too old, etc.);
5. Never having performed Hajj to the holy city of Mecca (within one's lifetime) while being financially able to do so (as per the Qur'an 3:97);
6. Cutting off the ties of relationships (choosing to never speak to one's parents for example and not forgive them);
7. Committing zina (adultery and/or fornication);
8. False accusations of zina;
9. Using intoxicants (khamr), such as alcohol, or any other mind-altering drugs or harmful substances. (To harm one's body is considered sinful.)
10. Gambling;
11. Lying about religion, i.e.: lying about God, Muhammad, Jesus or any of God's prophets or creations except to prevent harm to others or dissent in the community.
12. Oppression;
13. Despondence in Islam;
14. Suicide;
15. Imposing or forcing your religious beliefs on others.

Good deeds in Islam include:

1. Enjoining right;
2. Forbidding evil;
3. Kindness to all others;
4. Planting trees and preserving the environment;
5. Not hunting or harming animals, except for food;
6. Kindness to parents; with specific emphasis placed on kindness to one's mother;
7. Forgiving wrongs and apologizing and seeking forgiveness from those a Muslim has wronged;
8. To right one's wrongs;
9. Pick up harmful things from the road to prevent them from harming others;
10. To respect members of all religions;
11. To raise an orphan and feed the needy.

These references do not constitute all major sins in Islam or the extensive list of good deeds. There are over fifty-four other notable major sins and countless good deeds. Even the smallest act of kindness such as a friendly word or a smile is considered a good deed and rewardable kind act. Some within this list also represent the opinions of particular scholars and so they do not perfectly represent Islam. Islam encourages all of mankind to work to do good deeds every day and to avoid bad deeds/sins, to be the best they can be.

In addition to what Muslim scholars agree are the principal seven sins, the idea exists that the major sins extend far past the seven. These additional transgressions, potentially up to seventy, are not universally settled upon and nor are they explicitly stated in the Qur'an, however they are thought to be implied by the text. The supplementary sins as a whole lack the spiritual gravity of the original seven and include things such as drinking alcohol and eavesdropping.

== Theology ==
Throughout his works, al-Ghazali systematized the sins and vices from the traditions of the Quran and the Sunnah. These sins are referred to as "destructive qualities", "abominations of the soul", and "blameworthy qualities". Purification of the soul from such traits is necessary for every individual to obtain paradise and the most important duty in life. Besides mentioning the sin, he also mentions advises in order to avoid them.

Gluttony: While the body is endowed with desire for food in order to survive, the excess of eating is considered a vice. A moderate satisfaction is needed to ensure that the body is not too much occupied with access to food and neither growing their limbs too heavy. In order to avoid gluttony, al-Ghazali recommends different grades of diet: 1. not only to refrain from what is lawful, but also what is doubtful 2. to lessen the amount of food consumed and only to eat when one is truly hungry 3. to refrain from food for the sake of taste.

Excess in lust: Excessive desire for sexual intercourse is another vice mentioned. Similar to desire for food, desire for intercourse is implanted in humans for the purpose of propagation of the human species and not reprehensible in itself. However, it needs to be limited to one's spouse or slave and only moderately. Excess in sexual desire overpower reason, leads to adultery, lustful thoughts, and other sins, which are not only social crimes, but also taint the soul. In the worse case, passionate desire overcomes the individual, and they become enslaved to their urges, worse than lower animals. In order to reduce sexual urges, al-Ghazali refers to a statement by Muhammad, that hunger and marriage help against lust, but also adds to engage with business in order to occupy the mind with something else but lust.

Harmful speech: a quality of speech according to which someone uses vile speech, lying, or deception. It darkens the soul and trouble its balance and cannot enjoy full vision of God in the afterlife. Such sins also include speaking about what does not concern one and idle talk. However, these sins are considered to be only minor; a waste of time and thus causing imperfection, but not more harmful than that. Cursing anything God created, man, animal, or object, can be sinful. It implies to drive someone away from God's mercy, but since it is unknown whether or not God has driven them away, it amounts to interfere with divine affairs. Only if there is evidence from revelation that God cursed someone, curses are permissible. Even a heretic or infidel might die as a Muslim, and thus their fate is unknown and they must not be cursed. False promises derive from the sin of hypocrisy. One may make a hasty promise, but it is the carnal desires (nafs) which provoke them not to keep it, owning the difficulty involved. It is not a sin, however, to keep a promise, if made with the resolve to keep it, but later broken by compulsion.

Backbiting: The worse sin committed with the tongue is backbiting. Al-Ghazali quotes a hadith stating that it is "more serious than thirty adulteries". Overall, it consists in saying something which is likely to hurt another person's feelings. It also includes, writing, speech, imitation, and indication by gesture. It also implies believing the rumor. He also adds "backbiting in the mind"; which means, that imagining (more than a passing thought) or categorizing someone as evil, without witnessing it or without clear proof. Intentionally spying on someone in order to reveal their sinfulness is also considered a sin, as it is an effort to discover "what God has kept secret". Exceptions are when made with a good purpose: seeking justice, help from an authority, removing evil, informing those able to remove it, to or seek a legal opinion from someone.

Strong anger: Anger itself is not reprehensible, as it is implanted in the soul to repel danger. Approved forms of anger include opposing injustice and intolerance of humiliation. Strong anger is considered a sin as it poisons the soul, leads to impatience, and causes many vices and sins. Moderation of anger teaches to use it only in necessary situations. The goal of self-regulation is either to become free from anger or, if not possible, to prevent the resulting actions. The most pious and devote Muslims would be able to learn to be free from anger, as they do not love "worldly things" and thus, "anger is never aroused". As redemption for anger, al-Ghazali recommends to "seek refuge in God against the devil", for anger is stirred up by a devil. If it does not help, he advises to sit, to lay down, or to wash the face with cold water. Related to anger is the sin of rancor, which is considered to arise when the immediate anger cannot be satisfied, but still lingers in the mind. This sin may lead to more grievous sins, such as envy. To calm the anger, it is advised to give him his due, not more not less. The other is to forgive him and strengthen one's relationship with him, the latter being the favorable action. Forgiveness is to be distinguished from repression of anger, which in turn may increase the weight of the sin.

Envy: Envy is one of the three sins considered to be "both destructive in themselves and the roots of all other evil dispositions". Envy is defined as a state of mind in which a man suffers from the good another person achieves and a desire to take it away or ruin it for them, even if they do not obtain any advantage by that. It is particularly dangerous because it leads to other major sins, such as slander and murder. Envy is to be distinguished from disliking the goods another person obtains, if these goods harm others, for then it is disliked for it is a mean of corruption or pain. As means of antidote for envy, it is advised to feel another's happiness and sufferings equally.

Love of Wealth: Love of wealth (or greed) is another root sin. As such, removal from the soul is necessary and a major obstacle to the path to paradise. It includes neglect of the duties incurred by wealth, hatred for the poor, and abasement to the rich. Wealth is not sinful insofar as it provides the possessor's necessary minimum or moderate amount of food, clothing, shelter, health, knowledge. The minimum must be sought as being wealthy runs into the risk of denying God, and, even if used only for used in a permissible way, easily leads to the enjoyment of permissible pleasure but gradually extends to harmful entertainment. The benefits of wealth are supposed to be able to perform religious acts, to use it for charity, acts of humanity (such as gifts, entertainment of guests, aid, etc.), use for the common good (e.g. building bridges, mosques, hospitals, etc.). Closely related is the sin of miserliness; the sin of hoarding wealth when it should be spent. One should remember the impermanence of one's wealth and death in order to lose one's own attachment.

Pride: Pride is considered to be the greatest of all sins. Pride can be directed against God, the prophets, or against other people. Pride against other people may be in noble birth, physical beauty, strength, wealth, friends, relatives, or followers. In this context, al-Ghazali explicitly quotes a hadith according to which no human with a grain of pride in the mind will attain paradise. He explains that pride is a sin interconnected with a lot of other sins, and that a proud person also commits all other sins. Pride also prevents people from acknowledging the truth from others, thus rendering them unable to learn. Knowledge is considered to be the cure for pride, as knowledge about the self and the Creator makes the proudful realize its own small worth and irrelevance. Prayers are also helpful to banish pride. This also leads to understand that only God can be rightfully proud, as only God is absolute. As such, the prideful implicitly disputes God's absoluteness and claims divinity for himself.

== See also ==
- Outline of Islam
- Glossary of Islam
- Index of Islam-related articles
- Islamic views on piety
- Ghibah
- Despondence in Islam
