= Chofetz Chaim =

1873 book by Yisrael Meir Kagan

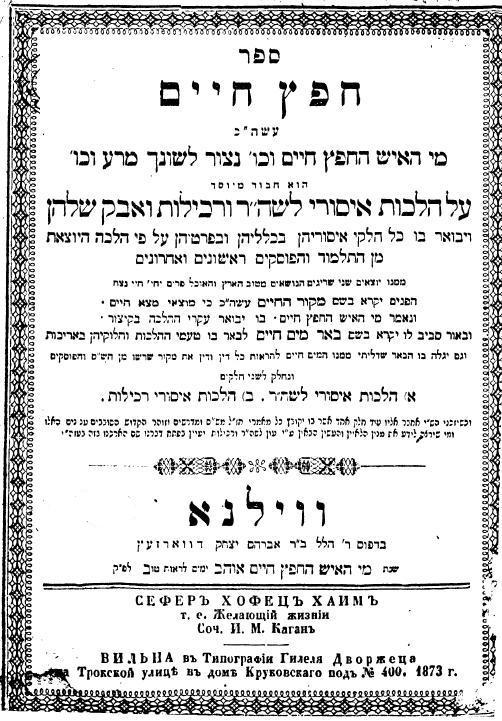
Chofetz Chaim: cover page 1873 ed.

The Sefer Chofetz Chaim (or Chafetz Chaim or Hafetz Hayim) (Hebrew: חָפֵץ חַיִּים, trans. "Pursuer of Life") is a book by Rabbi Yisrael Meir Kagan, who is also called "the Chofetz Chaim" after it. The book deals with the Jewish laws of speech.

The title of the Chafetz Chaim is taken from Psalms:

Come, children, hearken to me; I will teach you the fear of the Lord. Who is the man who desires life ("Chafetz Chaim"), who loves days to see goodness? Guard your tongue from evil and your lips from speaking deceitfully. Shun evil and do good, seek peace and pursue it.

— Psalm 34:12–15

The book's subject is Hilchoth Shmirath HaLashon (laws of clean speech). Kagan provides copious sources from the Torah, Talmud, and Rishonim about the severity of Jewish law on tale-mongering and gossip. Lashon hara, literally "'the evil tongue", i.e., evil speech (or loosely gossip and slander and prohibitions of defamation), is sometimes translated as "prohibitions of slander", but most commonly concerns the prohibitions of saying evil/bad/unpleasant things, whether or not they are true.

The book is divided into three parts:

- The legal text is Mekor Chayim ("Source of Life").
- Be'er Mayim Chayim ("Well of living water"), the footnotes and legal argument.
- It is commonly printed together with the text Shemirath haLashon ("Guarding of the tongue"), an ethical treatise on the proper use of the faculty of speech.

== The author ==
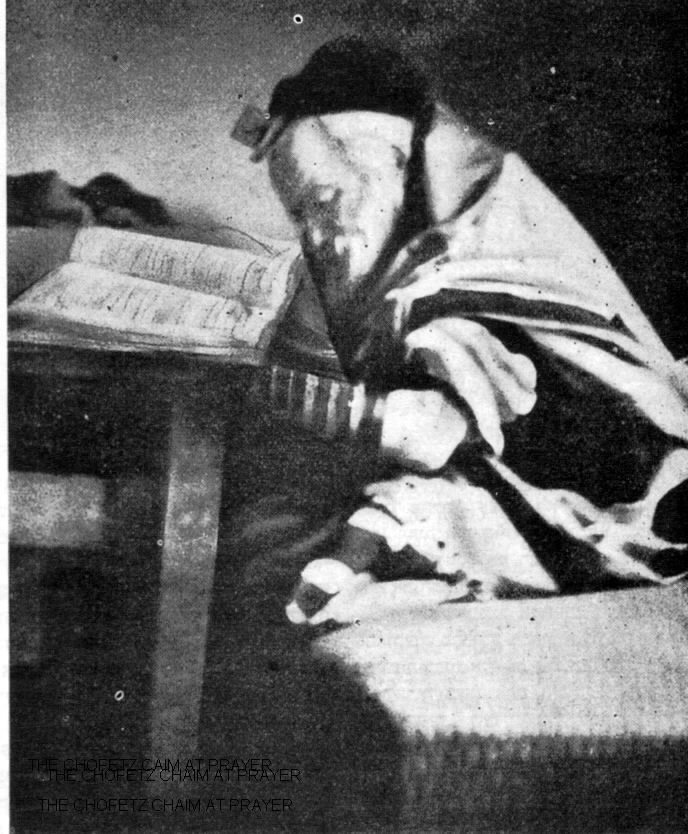
Kagan praying.

Yisrael Meir Kagan is commonly known as the Chafetz Chaim, the name of his book. He was born in Dzyatlava, Grodno Governorate, Russian Empire (today Belarus), on January 26, 1838. By 1869 his house became known as the Radin Yeshiva. Kagan published twenty-one books. His first work, Chafetz Chaim (1873), is the first attempt to organize and clarify the laws regarding Lashon Hara. Other notable works include the Sefer Shmirat HaLashon, an ethical work on the importance of guarding one's tongue and the Mishnah Berurah (printed between 1894 and 1907) which is a commentary on the "Orach Chayim", the first section of the Shulchan Aruch, and has been accepted among many Ashkenazi Jews as an authoritative source of Halacha.

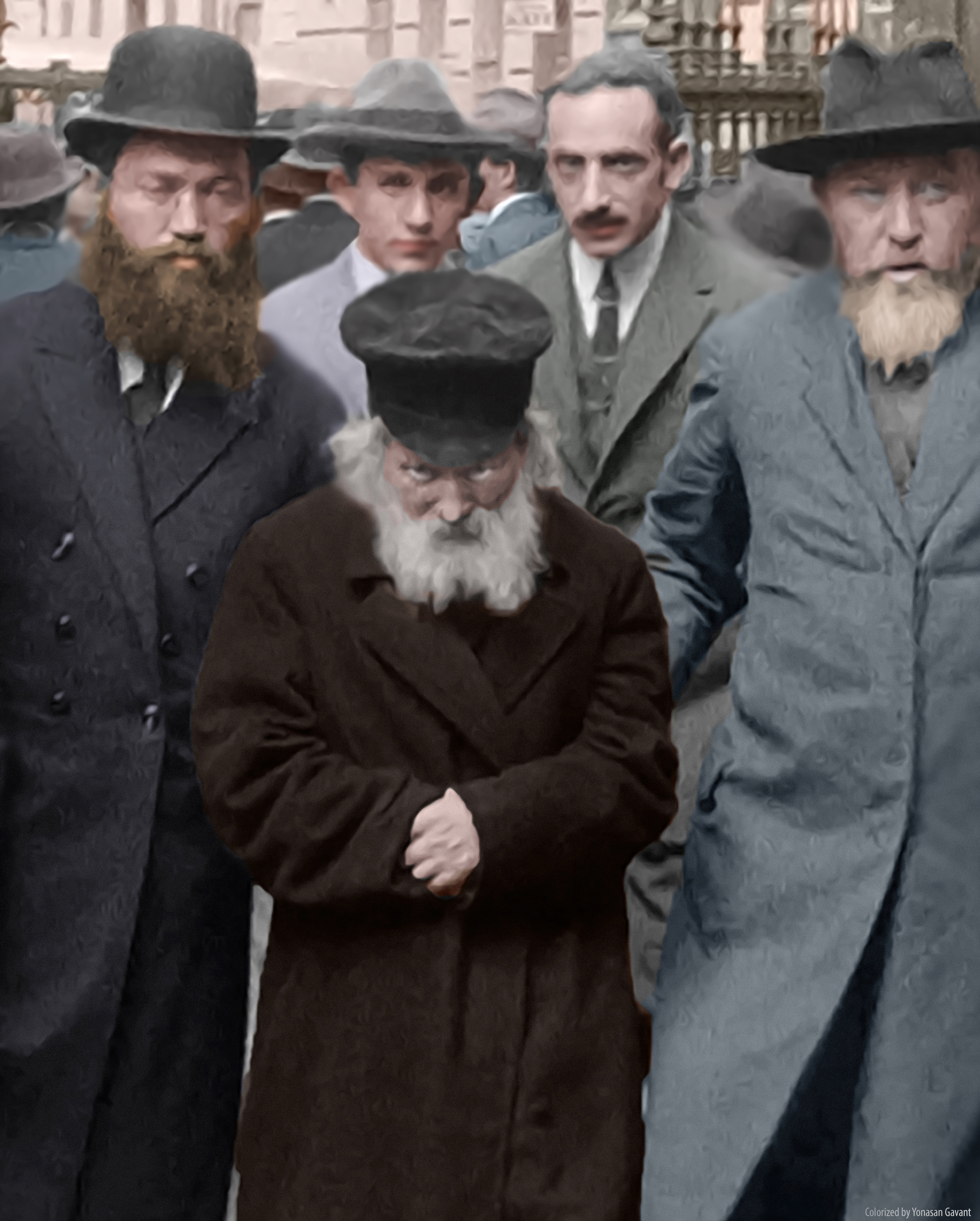
Kagan in Vienna, 1923
