= Ghibah =

Backbiting in Islam

Ghibah (Arabic: الغيبة ghībah) is backbiting as understood in Islam. It is generally regarded as a major sin in Islam and compared in the Qur'an to 'the abomination of eating the flesh of a dead brother'.

== Quran ==
There are two verses in the Quran about backbiting. Verse 12 of Surah Al-Hujurat says:

Believers, beware of many ideas. Surely some ideas are wrong. And don't look for secrets. Let none of you slander anyone behind his back. Would any of you like to eat the flesh of their dead brother? In fact, you hate it. Fear Allah. Surely Allah is Accepting repentance, Most Merciful. Surah Al-Hujurat (49): Verse: 12

Verse 148 of Surah Al-Nisa says:

Allah does not like the spread of evil, but it is different when someone is wronged (or when oppression in happened). And Allah is All-Hearing, All-Knowing.

— Surah Nisa (4): Verse: 148

== Hadith ==
The hadith defines backbiting and generally advises Muslims not to do it about other Muslims and not to publicize and keep secrets (كتمان الاسرار, kitma'n al-asra'r) of others.

Yahya Ibn Ayyub, Qutaybah and Ibn Hujar (R.A.) ..... Abu Hurairah (R.A.) narrated that the Messenger of Allah, may God bless him and grant him peace, said: Do you know what backbiting is? They said, Allah and His Messenger know best. He said, (backbiting is) discussing something about your brother that he dislikes. The question is, what do you say if what I am saying is true in my brother? He said, "If what you say about him is true in him, then you have slandered him." And if it is not in him, then you slander him.

— Muslim 2589

Itban bin Malik (May Allah be pleased with him) said in his long Hadith cited in the Chapter entitled 'Hope' reported: When the Prophet (ﷺ) stood up to offer As-Salat (the prayer) he asked, "Where is Malik bin Ad-Dukhshum?" A man replied: "He is a hypocrite. He does not love Allah and His Messenger." The Prophet (ﷺ) said, "Do not say that. Do you not know that he said: La ilaha illallah (there is no true god except Allah),' seeking His Pleasure. Allah has made the fire of Hell unlawful for him who affirms that none has the right to be worshipped but Allah."

— Sahih al-Bukhari 77, 189, 424, 425, 667, 686, 838, 840, 1186, 4010, 5401, 6354, 6422, 6938, Muslim 33, Abu Dawud 1411, Ibn Majah 660, 754, Ahmad 23109, 23126

On the authority of Zayd Ibn Aslam, "In the time of the Messenger of God, when a man confessed that he had committed adultery (Zina), the Messenger of God asked for a whip. When he was given a torn/old whip he said, “Isn't that better?” When a new whip was brought, he said, "Bring an older one". Next came a strap that was (from use) a bit old/soft. Then he gave it to the man and gave him a hundred lashes. Then he said, “O people! Do not transgress the limits of Allah. If anyone commits such an abominable crime, let him keep it secret, for if anyone discloses it, We will execute the law of Allah's Book by inflicting upon him the prescribed punishment."

— Al-Muatta, 41 2.12 (English)

Malik related to me from Yahya ibn Said from Said ibn al-Musayyab that a man from the Aslam tribe came to Abu Bakr as-Siddiq and said to him, "I have committed adultery." Abu Bakr said to him, "Have you mentioned this to anyone else?" He said, "No." Abu Bakr said to him, "Then cover it up with the veil of Allah. Allah accepts tawba from his slaves." His self was still unsettled, so he went to Umar ibn al-Khattab. He told him the same as he had said to Abu Bakr, and Umar told him the same as Abu Bakr had said to him. His self was still not settled so he went to the Messenger of Allah, may Allah bless him and grant him peace, and said to him, "I have committed adultery," insistently. The Messenger of Allah, may Allah bless him and grant him peace, turned away from him three times. Each time the Messenger of Allah, may Allah bless him and grant him peace, turned away from him until it became too much. The Messenger of Allah, may Allah bless him and grant him peace, questioned his family, "Does he have an illness which affects his mind, or is he mad?" They said, "Messenger of Allah, by Allah, he is well." The Messenger of Allah, may Allah bless him and grant him peace, said, "Unmarried or married?" They said, "Married, Messenger of Allah." The Messenger of Allah, may Allah bless him and grant him peace, gave the order and he was stoned.

— Al-Muatta, 41 2.2

Narrated on the authority of Umar Ibn Khattab (RA). He said that during the time of Allah's Messenger (may peace be upon him) some people were arrested on the basis of revelations. Now that the revelation has stopped, I will judge you based on the kind of 'Amal that will be revealed before us. So we will secure and bring near to him who manifests good before us, we have nothing to do with his heart. Allah will take account of his heart. And whoever exposes evil deeds before Us, We will not grant them security and will not recognize them as truthful; Although he says that his heart is good.

— Sahih Bukhari: 2641, Sahih Bukhari, 3:48:809 (English)

=== Concealing secrets ===
Rasulullah (s.a.w.) said, 'You do not find the faults and mistakes of Muslims. Whoever finds and exposes the faults of other Muslims, Allah himself exposes his faults. And Allah humiliates him in his own house who exposes other Muslim's fault.

— (Abu Dawud: 4880, Tirmidhi, Hadith: 2032)

The Prophet (peace be upon him) said, "Whoever keeps his Muslim brother's secret secret, Allah will keep his secret secret on the Day of Resurrection." And whoever reveals the secrets of his Muslim brother, Allah will reveal his secrets. Even because of this, he will humiliate him even in his house.

— (Ibn Majah: 2546)

Narrated by Abu Huraira (R.A.), Rasulullah (S.A.W.) said, 'The sins of all my Ummah will be forgiven; But the fault-finder will not be forgiven. He expresses the fault in the way that a person did something during the night, and then the morning came. Almighty Allah kept his work secret. He says (to people in the morning), O so-and-so! I did this last night. But he spent the night in such a state that Allah kept his deeds secret and he removed this veil of Allah in the morning.'

— (Sahih Bukhari, Hadith: 6069)

The Prophet (peace be upon him) said, "Whoever conceals the faults of others, Allah will conceal his faults in this world and the hereafter."

— (Sahih Muslim: 2699)

the mother of Anas bin Malik, may God be pleased with her, when her son Anas was late, so she asked him: “ What kept you? He said: The Messenger of God sent me on an errand.” She said: “What is his errand?” He said: “It is a secret.” She said: “Do not divulge the secret of the Messenger of God, may God bless him and grant him peace, to anyone.”

One day, Muawiyah (may Allah be pleased with him) confided a matter to Al-Walid ibn Utbah. Al-Walid said to his father, “O my father, the Commander of the Faithful confided in me a matter, and I do not think he would conceal from you what he disclosed to others.” He said, “Do not tell it to me, for whoever keeps a secret will have the choice, and whoever divulges it will have the choice.” Al-Walid said, “O my father, does this come between a man and his father?” He said, “No, by Allah, my son, but I do not like you to humiliate your tongue with secret conversations.” Al-Walid said, “So I went to Muawiyah (may Allah be pleased with him) and informed him. He said, “O Walid, my brother has freed you from the slavery of mistake.”

Ali ibn Abi Talib, may God be pleased with him, said: Your secret is your prisoner. If you speak about it, you become its prisoner.

Abu Sa’id Al-Khudri (may Allah be pleased with him) said: The Messenger of Allah (blessings and peace of Allah be upon him) said: “The worst of people in the sight of Allah on the Day of Resurrection will be a man who has intercourse with his wife, and she with him, then he divulges her secret.” It even reached the point where the Prophet (blessings and peace of Allah be upon him) likened him to a male devil who came to a female devil on the street while people were watching.

Amr ibn al-Aas, may God be pleased with him, said: “I never entrusted my secret to anyone and they divulged it to me, and I blamed them. I was the one who was most tight with it when I entrusted it to them.”

Al-Muhallab said the lowest moral of a noble person is to keep a secret, and the highest moral of a noble person is to forget what has been confided in him.

== Scope of validity ==
Based on the mentioned second verse and some reliable hadiths Islamic jurists including Al-Nawawi in his book Gardens of the Righteous have declared backbiting in 6 cases to be valid -

1. and seeking justice against a tyrant ruler or oppressor
2. seeking a solution to a problem from a judicial person or someone reliable,
3. exposing religious errors while propagating Islam,
4. about a person engaged in openly persistent deadly sins or Bid'ah which harm people,
5. warning someone of danger and harm in case of marriage, business and contract, and
6. defining one's characteristic with the popular negative traits without which he can not be recognised easily.

Also, in the case of people who repeatedly commit crimes openly and show no remorse, and there is no possibility of repentance, if backbiting them openly can warn them and save others from their harm, then backbiting them is permissible.

== See also ==
- Nifaq
- Taqwa
- Human cannibalism
- Aghori
- Despondence in Islam
