= Yisrael Meir Kagan =

Belarusian rabbi (1838–1933)

Rabbi Yisrael Meir Kagan
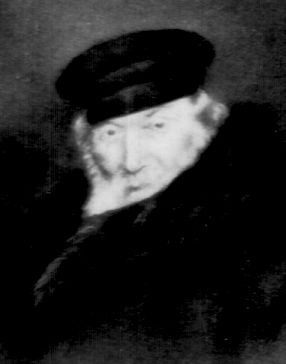
- Kagan in 1929
- Title: The Chofetz Chaim

Personal life
- Born: February 6, 1838 Dzyatlava, Grodno Governorate, Russian Empire
- Died: September 15, 1933 (aged 95) Radun, Second Polish Republic

Religious life
- Religion: Judaism

Jewish leader
- Yahrtzeit: 24 Elul 5693

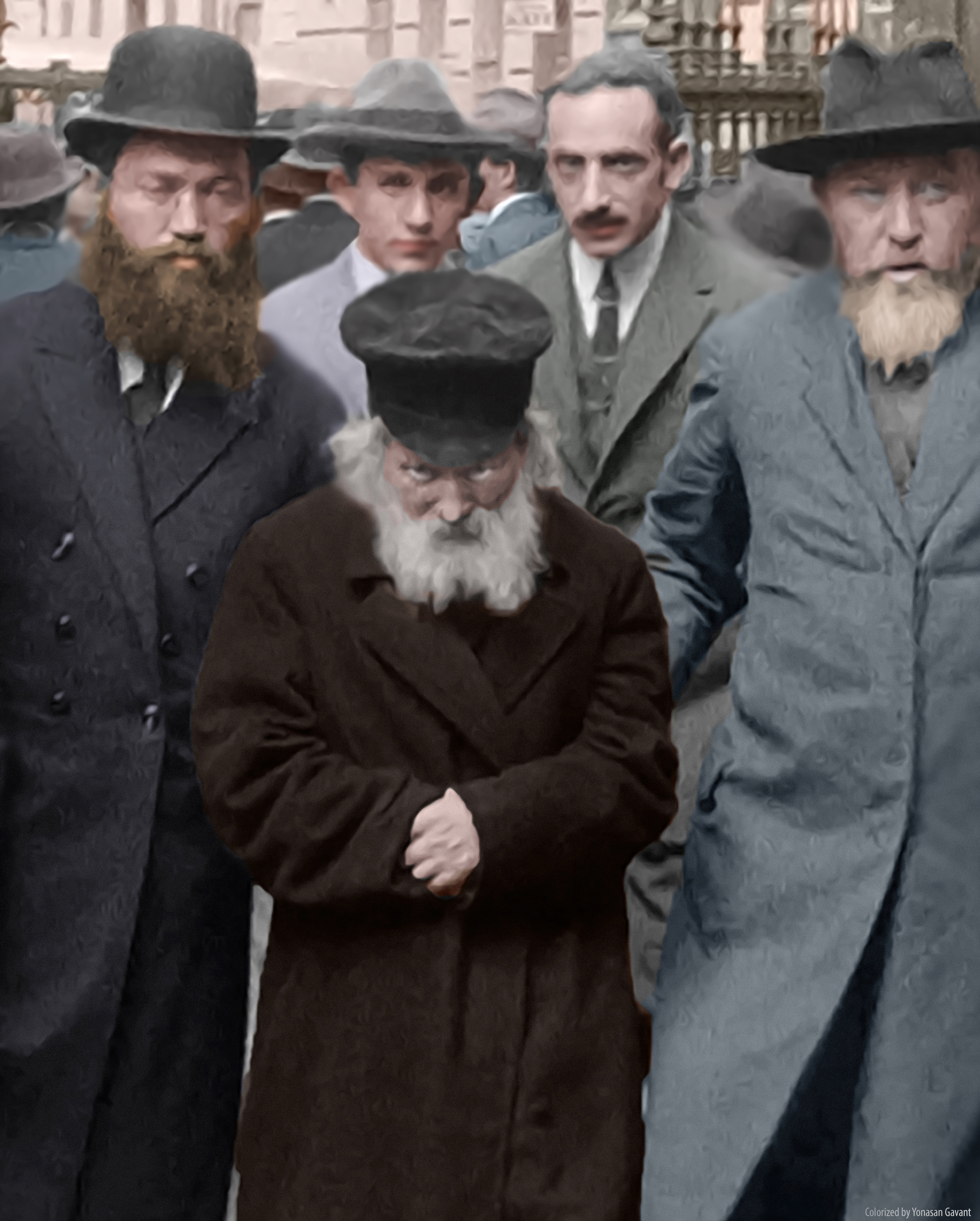
Kagan in Vienna, 1923

Yisrael Meir ha-Kohen Kagan (February 6, 1838 – September 15, 1933) was a Lithuanian rabbi, posek, and ethicist whose works are widely influential in Orthodox Jewish life. He was known popularly as the Chofetz Chaim, (Note: Hebrew: חפץ חיים, romanized: Chafetz Chaim, lit. 'Desirer of Life') after his book with that title on lashon hara, and was also well known for the Mishnah Berurah, (Note: Hebrew: משנה ברורה "Clear Teaching") his book on ritual law.

== Biography ==
Kagan was born on February 6, 1838, in Dzienciol (Yiddish: זשעטל, romanized: Zhetl), Grodno Governorate in Russian Empire (today Dzyatlava in Belarus), and died on 15 September 1933 in Raduń (Yiddish: ראַדין, romanized: Radin), Nowogródek Voivodeship in Second Polish Republic (now in Belarus). When Kagan was ten years old, his father, Aryeh Z'ev Kagan (Poupko), died during a cholera epidemic at the age of 46. His mother moved the family to Vilnius in order to continue her son's Jewish education. While in Vilnius, Kagan became a student of Jacob Barit. Kagan's mother, Dobrusha, remarried Reb Shimon Epstein, and moved to Radin.

At 17, he married Frieda Kagan (Epstein), the daughter of his stepfather, and settled in Radin. Later in life, he would revert his name back to Kagan. This is why there are a number of letters of his extant that he signed as Poupko and others as Kagan. When Kagan arrived in Vilnius, Rav Chaim Nachman Parnas, who had known Kagan's father well, was friendly to him. Reb Yisrael Gordon, a friend of Parnas, took the young Kagan into his home and paid him to learn with Gordon's son, Mordechai. He served as the town rabbi of Radin for a short period. He then resigned from this position to establish a yeshiva in the city, which eventually became world-famous first being led by the notable Naftoli Trop, followed by the esteemed son-in-law of his rabbi, Mendel Zaks. By all accounts, he was a modest and humble man, faithfully devoted to his Jewish faith. For a while, he had a shop selling household provisions, which he and his wife managed. From 1864 to 1869 he taught Talmud in Minsk and Vashilishok.

In 1869, Kagan formed a yeshiva in Radin. The yeshiva was a success and grew to prominence, later becoming known as "Yeshivas Chofetz Chaim of Radin". In addition to spreading Torah through his yeshiva, Kagan, who became known as "the Chofetz Chaim", was very active in Jewish causes. He traveled extensively to encourage the observance of Mitzvot and Shabbat amongst Jews. He became one of the most influential rabbis within Orthodox Judaism during the late 19th and early 20th century, taking a central leadership role in the World Agudath Israel movement in Eastern Europe. An author of many works of musar literature, he was sometimes associated with the Musar movement, although he did not support all aspects of that movement.

Although the anti-religious attitudes which pervaded Zionism greatly distressed him, Kagan initially refused to become personally involved in the matter and refrained from publicly denouncing the movement. When his views became known, he cautioned his students about joining the Zionists and declared its political aims as being contrary to the Torah. Kagan famously said that it would be preferable to lose a third of the amount of Torah we have throughout the world rather than join the World Zionist Organization. Elchonon Wasserman (murdered in July 1941) said that meant even if the majority of yeshivos would have to close, we would still not be allowed to join the Zionist movement. In 1903, his wife Frieda died, and two years later he remarried Miriam Frieda Kagan (Schneider), who was 37 years younger than him. She was the daughter of Reb Hillel Schneider of Lapis, the author of the book Beis Hillel. It was from this marriage that his son Aharon Kagan and his daughter Feigl Chaya Sacks were born. His son-in-law was Mendel Zaks.

In 1925, it was announced that he would be leaving Warsaw with his daughter and son-in-law to permanently settle in Petach Tikvah, in Mandatory Palestine. Upon discovering his plans, prominent rabbis and yeshiva deans persuaded him to remain in Radin and he died there on September 15, 1933, aged 95. He was interred in the nearby cemetery. Miriam Freida arrived in Montreal with her son Aharon via Siberia and Japan in 1942, and died in New York in 1946.

Many other Jewish religious institutions throughout the world also bear his name. One American yeshiva named in his honor is the Yeshivas Rabbeinu Yisrael Meir HaKohen centered in Queens, New York founded by his great nephew, Dovid Leibowitz, with several branches in the United States, Canada, and Israel. Kagan's teachings have inspired some English-speaking American Jews to establish the Chofetz Chaim Heritage Foundation, dedicated to the dissemination of his teachings to Jewish communities around the world. An Orthodox kibbutz in Israel, Hafetz Haim, was named in his honor.

During his lifetime, Kagan was venerated by Jews and non-Jews alike. Orthodox Jews across the world viewed him as one of the 36 righteous people, and Polish farmers were said to have lured him into their fields believing his feet would bring blessing to their crops.

According to some reports, despite his rabbinic leadership he did not hold semikhah until late in life, when he had to apply for a passport and needed formal semichah in order to honestly enter "rabbi" as his occupation. He then received his semikhah by telegraph from Chaim Ozer Grodzinski of Wilna. According to another report, though, he received semikhah much earlier, at age 17.

== Works ==
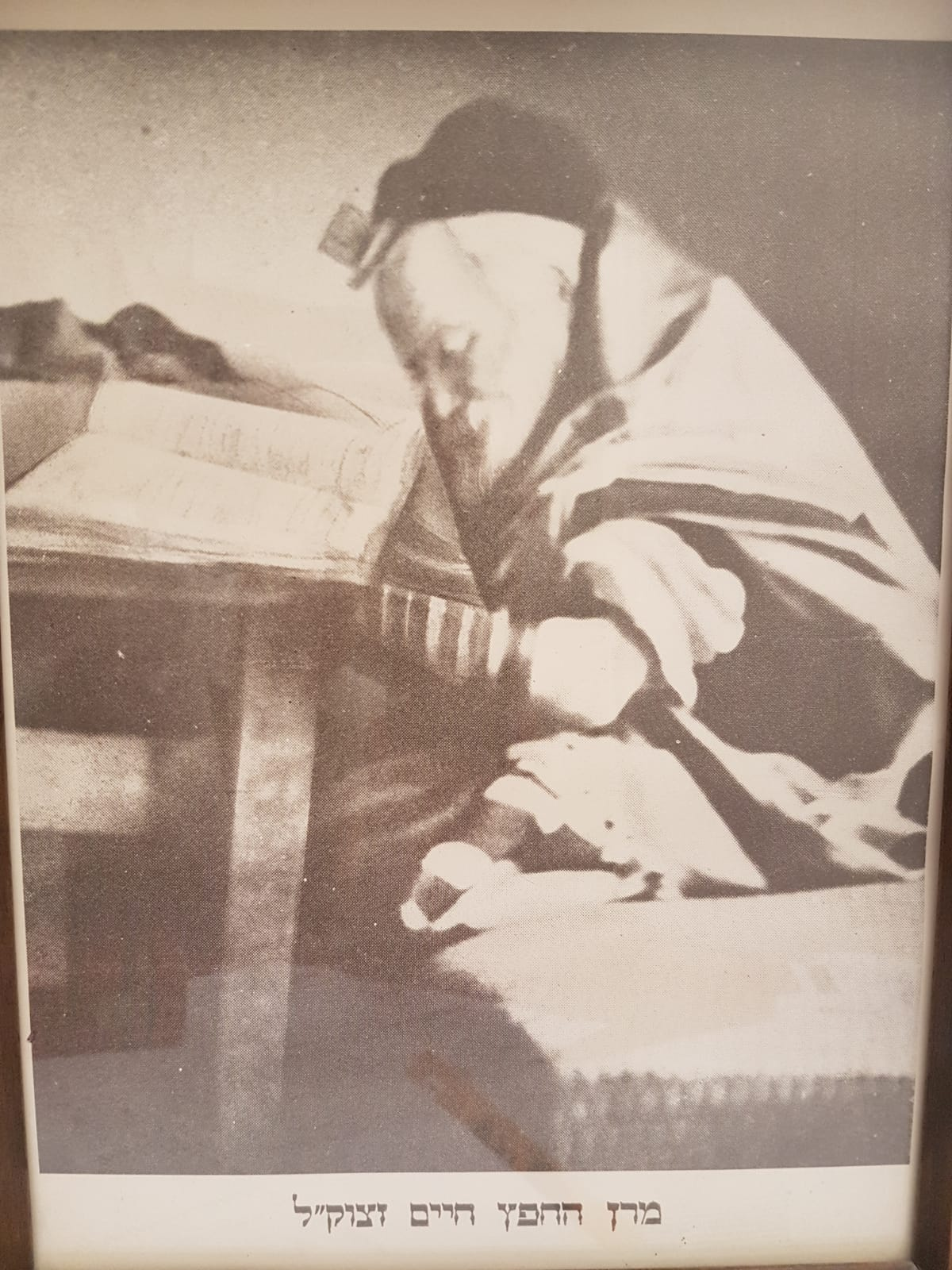
Yisrael Meir Kagan towards the end of his life.

- Chofetz Chaim (חָפֵץ חַיִּים "Seeker/Desirer [of] Life"), his first book, (published in 1873), deals with the Biblical laws of gossip and slander (known in Hebrew as Lashon Hara, meaning "Evil tongue"). View the online edition in Hebrew here
- Shemirat HaLashon ("Guarding of the Tongue"), is a comprehensive discussion of the philosophy behind the Jewish concepts of power of speech and guarding one's speech. It also serves as an inspirational work designed to motivate the reader to be vigilant in the ethical usage of his speech and avoidance of others' unethical speech. Published in 1876. View the online edition in Hebrew here
- Mishnah Berurah ("Clarified teachings") is an important and widely used commentary, consisting of six volumes, on the Orach Chayim section of Yosef Karo's digested compilation of practical Jewish Law, the Shulchan Aruch. It combines his own elucidations and differing opinions with those of other Aharonim (post-medieval authorities.) [As found in the book by Moses M. Yoshor "The Chafetz Chaim" on page 603 the 1st volume was published in 1884; 2nd volume in 1886; 3rd volume in 1891; 4th volume in 1898; 5th volume in 1902; 6th volume in 1907.]
- Biur Halacha ("Explanation of the Law") is a commentary tangential to the Mishna Berurah. It usually provides complex analysis of the legal rulings of earlier Jewish halachic authorities.
- Sha'ar HaTziyyun ("Gate of Distinction") serves primarily to document sources for laws and customs quoted in the Mishnah Berurah, but sometimes serves also to clarify ambiguous legal statements. The name Sha'ar HaTziyyun derives from the phrase sh'arim m'tzuyanim ba'halacha, translated as "gateways distinguished in (or marked in) Jewish Law," referring to the Torah study and scholarship that would distinguish Jewish homes. Kagan chose the title as a pun, hinting at the distinction of the scholarship referenced in his work, but primarily referring to (as he writes on his title page) the function of Sha'ar HaTziyyun to document (mark) sources.
- Ahavat Chesed – one volume, published in 1888. On the commandment of lending money to the needy, the value of being kind to one another and various ways to do so.
- Machaneh Yisrael – one volume, on the minimum requirements of Torah observance for soldiers in the army.
- Tiferes Odom – one volume, on the importance of a Jew having a beard and peyos (sidelocks).
- Geder Olam – one volume, published in 1890. On the importance of a married Jewish woman covering her hair.
- Nidchei Yisrael – two volumes, published in 1893.
- Shem Olam – one volume, published in 1893.
- Chomas Hadas – one volume, published in 1905. On the importance of a man to study Torah, and encourage others to learn, as well as the need to create groups in every city wherein a man could acquire Torah.
- Likutei Halachos, a halakhic digest of all sugyot on which there was no "Rif" or "Rosh"; originally intended to encourage the study of the laws of the Temple service. Five volumes: the first volume was published in 1900; 2nd volume in 1903; 3rd volume in 1913; 4th volume in 1922. There is a fifth volume called "Hashlamah" or "Completion" which was published in 1925.
- Gibores Ari – two volumes, published in 1907.
- Tohoras Yisroel – one volume, published in 1910. On the importance of women to purify themselves in the waters of a mikvah (ritual bath) in accordance with accepted halachic practice.
- Toras Kohanim – one volume, published in 1911. A commentary on Sifra (halachic midrash on the book of Leviticus).
- Asefas Zekenim – three volumes, published in 1913.
- Chovas Hashemiro – one volume, published in 1915.
- Toras Habayis – one volume, published in 1923.
- Zechor Lemiryom – one volume, published in 1925.
- Beis Yisroel – one volume, published in 1925.
- Sefer Hamitzvos Hakotzor – two volumes on those Biblical commandments that are applicable during the Exile, outside the land of Israel, and when the Temple is not in existence. Published in 1931.
- Tzipita Lishuah ("Have you yearned for the redemption") is based on a passage from tractate Shabbat, which states that after one passes away, he is asked by the heavenly court: "Have you yearned for the redemption?" This work describes the importance of actively awaiting Moshiach every day and doing everything in one's power (learning Torah and doing mitzvot) to bring the redemption. The Chofetz Chaim's expectation of the immediate redemption was so strong that he would always carry special garments to change into once the redemption began. Rabbi Daniel Glatstein posits (in his expanded edition published by Artscroll in 2025) that it was first published as a supplement to the Hamodia magazine (published by Eliyahu Akiva Rabinowitz, and forerunner to the Hamodia) circa 1913, and subsequently published with a Yiddish translation and commentary by his student Rabbi Yosef Meir Jacobson in Boston in 1921, and then published in 1929 by his son-in-law, in Tel Aviv.

== Sources ==
- Yoshor, Moses Meir (June 1986) [1937]. Chafetz Chaim, the life and works of Rabbi Yisrael Meir Kagan of Radin. rendered into English by Charles Wengrov (1st Revised ed.). New York, NY: Mesorah publications. ISBN 0-89906-462-0.
- "Chofetz Chaim, 105, is Dead in Poland". The New York Times. 16 September 1933. p. 13.
