= Gossip =

Idle talk or rumour, especially about personal or private affairs of others

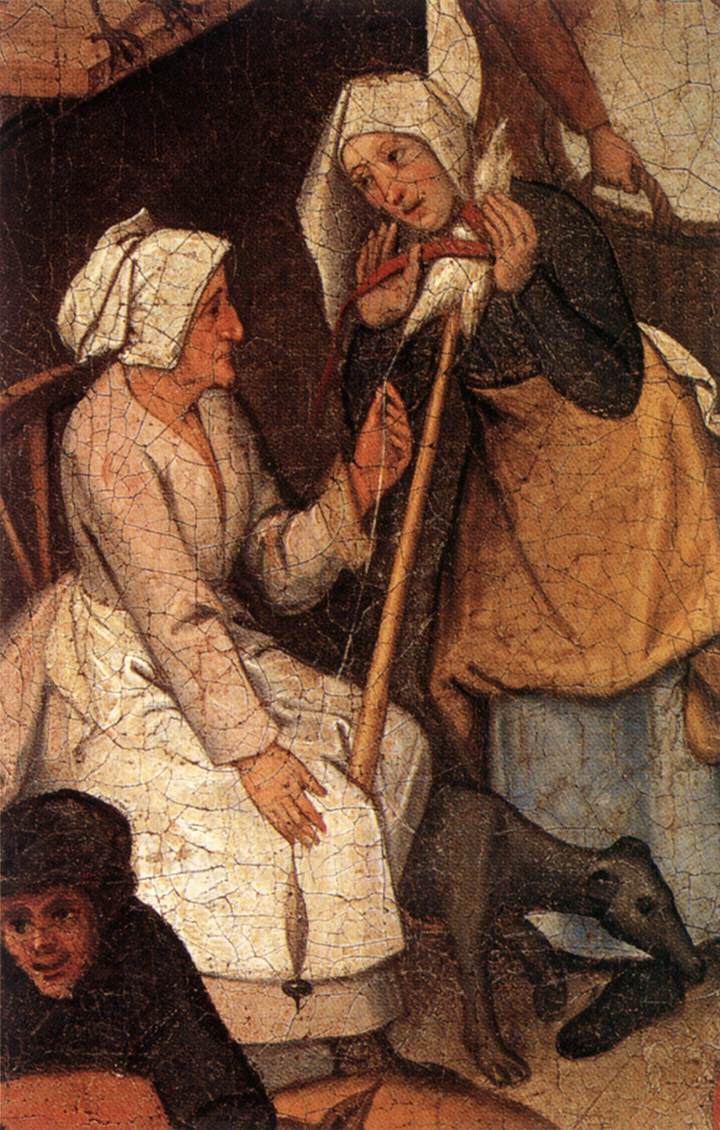
One winds on the distaff what the other spins (Both spread gossip) by Pieter Bruegel the Elder (c. 16th century)

Gossip consists of rumors or other information about the personal or private affairs of others. Gossiping is the sharing of gossip. Gossip often circulates within social groups and may serve social functions such as bonding, norm enforcement, or the sharing of reputational information. However, gossiping has often been viewed negatively by societies throughout history.

== Etymology ==
The word is from Old English godsibb, from god and sibb, the term for the godparents of one's child or the parents of one's godchild, generally very close friends. In the 16th century, the word assumed the meaning of a person, mostly a woman, one who delights in idle talk, a newsmonger, a tattler. In the early 19th century, the term was extended from the talker to the conversation of such persons. The verb to gossip, meaning "to be a gossip", first appears in the writings of Shakespeare.

The term originates from the bedroom at the time of childbirth. Giving birth used to be a social event exclusively attended by women. The pregnant woman's female relatives and neighbors would congregate and idly converse. In the Middle Ages, "a gossip" referred to a community of tight-knit friendships between women. Over time, gossip came to mean talk of others.

== Functions ==
This Soviet poster in war conveys the message: "Don't chatter! Gossiping borders on treason" (1941).

Gossip can:

- reinforce – or punish the lack of – morality and accountability
- reveal passive aggression, isolating and harming others
- build and maintain a sense of community with shared interests, information, and values
- begin a courtship that helps one find their desired mate, by counseling others
- provide a peer-to-peer mechanism for disseminating information

== Workplace gossip ==
Mary Gormandy White, a human resource expert, gives the following "signs" for identifying workplace gossip:

- Animated people become silent ("Conversations stop when you enter the room")
- People begin staring at someone
- Workers indulge in inappropriate topics of conversation.

White suggests "five tips ... [to] handle the situation with aplomb:

1. Rise above the gossip
2. Understand what causes or fuels the gossip
3. Do not participate in workplace gossip.
4. Allow for the gossip to go away on its own
5. If it persists, "gather facts and seek help."

Peter Vajda identifies gossip as a form of workplace violence, noting that it is "essentially a form of attack." Gossip is thought by many to "empower one person while disempowering another" (Hafen).Accordingly, many companies have formal policies in their employee handbooks against gossip. Sometimes there is room for disagreement on exactly what constitutes unacceptable gossip, since workplace gossip may take the form of offhand remarks about someone's tendencies such as "He always takes a long lunch," or "Don't worry, that's just how she is."

TLK Healthcare cites as examples of gossip, "tattletaling to the boss without intention of furthering a solution or speaking to co-workers about something someone else has done to upset us." Corporate email can be a particularly dangerous method of gossip delivery, as the medium is semi-permanent and messages are easily forwarded to unintended recipients; accordingly, a Mass High Tech article advised employers to instruct employees against using company email networks for gossip. Low self-esteem and a desire to "fit in" are frequently cited as motivations for workplace gossip.

There are five essential functions that gossip has in the workplace (according to DiFonzo & Bordia):

- Helps individuals learn social information about other individuals in the organization (often without even having to meet the other individual)
- Builds social networks of individuals by bonding co-workers together and affiliating people with each other.
- Breaks existing bonds by ostracizing individuals within an organization.
- Enhances one's social status/power/prestige within the organization.
- Informs individuals as to what is considered socially acceptable behavior within the organization.

According to Kurkland and Pelled, workplace gossip can be very serious depending upon the amount of power that the gossiper has over the recipient, which will in turn affect how the gossip is interpreted. There are four types of power that are influenced by gossip:

- Coercive: when a gossiper tells negative information about a person, their recipient might believe that the gossiper will also spread negative information about them. This causes the gossiper's coercive power to increase.
- Reward: when a gossiper tells positive information about a person, their recipient might believe that the gossiper will also spread positive information about them. This causes the gossiper's reward power to increase.
- Expert: when a gossiper seems to have very detailed knowledge of either the organization's values or about others in the work environment, their expert power becomes enhanced.
- Referent: this power can either be reduced OR enhanced to a point. When people view gossiping as a petty activity done to waste time, a gossiper's referent power can decrease along with their reputation. When a recipient is thought of as being invited into a social circle by being a recipient, the gossiper's referent power can increase, but only to a high point where then the recipient begins to resent the gossiper (Kurland & Pelled).

=== Negative consequences of the gossip ===
Some serious negative consequences of gossip may include:

- Lost productivity and time wasting
- Erosion of trust and morale between members of the working community
- Increased anxiety among employees as rumors circulate without any clear information as to what is fact and what is not
- Growing divisiveness among employees as people "take sides", risks of "infighting" that may further deteriorate unity
- Hurt feelings and reputations
- Jeopardized chances for the gossipers' advancement as they are perceived as unprofessional, and
- Attrition: good employees tend to leave the company due to the unhealthy work atmosphere and lack of trust

Turner and Weed theorize that among the three main types of responders to workplace conflict are attackers who cannot keep their feelings to themselves and express their feelings by attacking whatever they can. Attackers are further divided into up-front attackers and behind-the-back attackers. Turner and Weed note that the latter "are difficult to handle because the target person is not sure of the source of any criticism, nor even always sure that there is criticism."

It is possible however, that there may be illegal, unethical, or disobedient behavior happening at the workplace and this may be a case where reporting the behavior may be viewed as gossip. It is then left up to the authority in charge to fully investigate the matter and not simply look past the report and assume it to be workplace gossip.

Informal networks through which communication occurs in an organization are sometimes called the grapevine. In a study done by Harcourt, Richerson, and Wattier, it was found that middle managers in several different organizations believed that gathering information from the grapevine was a much better way of learning information than through formal communication with their subordinates (Harcourt, Richerson & Wattier).

== Various views ==
Some see gossip as trivial, hurtful and socially, spiritually and/or intellectually unproductive. Some people view gossip as a lighthearted way of spreading information. Authorities or would-be authorities may have a negative view of gossip as something undesirable or dangerous. Philosophical analysis by Emrys Westacott points to the role of gossip in (for example) cementing friendships and combatting abuses of power. A feminist definition of gossip presents it as "a way of talking between women, intimate in style, personal and domestic in scope and setting, a female cultural event which springs from and perpetuates the restrictions of the female role, but also gives the comfort of validation." (Jones, 1990:243)

=== In early modern England ===
In early modern England, the word "gossip" referred to companions in childbirth, not limited to the midwife. It also became a term for women-friends generally, with no necessary derogatory connotations. (OED n. definition 2. a. "A familiar acquaintance, friend, chum", supported by references from 1361 to 1873). It commonly referred to an informal local sorority or social group, who could enforce socially acceptable behavior through private censure or through public rituals, such as "rough music", the cucking stool and the skimmington ride.

Silvia Federici notes that, in the sixteenth century, satirical literature and mystery plays that mocked women and expressed misogynous sentiments gave way to what could be described as a "war on women".

In Thomas Harman's 1566 Caveat for Common Cursitors, a 'walking mort' relates how she was forced to agree to meet a man in his barn but informed his wife. The wife arrived with her "five furious, sturdy, muffled gossips," who caught the errant husband with "his hosen [trousers] about his legs" and gave him a sound beating. The story functions as a morality tale in which the gossips uphold the social order.

Sir Herbert Maxwell Bart, in The Chevalier of the Splendid Crest [1900] at the end of chapter three portrays the king as referring to his loyal knight "Sir Thomas de Roos" in kindly terms as "my old gossip". Whilst a historical novel of that time the reference implies a continued use of the term "Gossip" as a childhood friend as late as 1900.

=== In Judaism ===
Judaism considers gossip spoken without a constructive purpose (known in Hebrew as "evil tongue", lashon hara) to be a sin. Speaking negatively about people, even if retelling true facts, counts as sinful, as it demeans the dignity of man — both the speaker and the subject of the gossip. According to Proverbs 18:8: "The words of a gossip are like choice morsels: they go down to a man's innermost parts."

=== In Christianity ===
The Christian perspective on gossip typically aligns with modern cultural assumptions of the phenomenon, especially with the assumption that generally speaking, gossip is negative speech. However, due to the complexity of the phenomenon, biblical scholars have more precisely identified the form and function of gossip, even identifying a socially positive role for the social process as it is described in the New Testament. Of course, this does not mean that there are not numerous texts in the New Testament that see gossip as dangerous negative speech.

Thus, for example, the Epistle to the Romans associates gossips ("backbiters") with a list of sins including sexual immorality and with murder:

28: And even as they did not like to retain God in their knowledge, God gave them over to a reprobate mind, to do those things which are not convenient;
29: Being filled with all unrighteousness, fornication, wickedness, covetousness, maliciousness; full of envy, murder, debate, deceit, malignity; whisperers,
30: Backbiters, haters of God, despiteful, proud, boasters, inventors of evil things, disobedient to parents,
31: Without understanding, covenant breakers, without natural affection, implacable, unmerciful:
32: Who knowing the judgment of God, that they which commit such things are worthy of death, not only do the same, but have pleasure in them that do them. (Romans 1:28-32)

According to Matthew 18, Jesus also taught that conflict-resolution among church members ought to begin with the aggrieved party attempting to resolve their dispute with the offending party alone. Only if this did not work would the process escalate to the next step, in which another church member would become involved. After that, if the person at fault still would not "hear", the matter was to be fully investigated by the church elders, and if not resolved, it was to be then exposed publicly.

Based on texts like these that portray gossip negatively, many Christian authors generalize on the phenomenon. So, in order to gossip, writes Phil Fox Rose, we "must harden our heart towards the 'out' person. We draw a line between ourselves and them; define them as being outside the rules of Christian charity... We create a gap between ourselves and God's Love." As we harden our heart towards more people and groups, he continues, "this negativity and feeling of separateness will grow and permeate our world, and we'll find it more difficult to access God's love in any aspect of our lives."

The New Testament is also in favor of group accountability (Ephesians 5:11; 1st Tim 5:20; James 5:16; Gal 6:1-2; 1 Cor 12:26), which may be associated with gossip.

Gossip as a breach of secrecy has parallels with confession: the medieval Christian church sought to control both from its position as a powerful regulator.

=== In Islam ===
Islam calls tattling as namimah (نميمة), it is also related to ghibah (backbiting), which is the equivalent of eating the flesh of one's dead brother. According to Muslims, backbiting harms its victims without offering them any chance of defense, just as dead people cannot defend against their flesh being eaten. Muslims are expected to treat others like brothers (regardless of their beliefs, skin-color, gender, or ethnic origin), deriving from Islam's concept of brotherhood amongst its believers.

=== In the Baháʼí Faith ===
The Baháʼí Faith labels backbiting as the "worst human quality and the most great sin..." In their faith, murder would be considered less negative than backbiting. Bahá'u'lláh, the Prophet-Founder of the Baháʼí Faith stated: "Backbiting quencheth the light of the heart, and extinguished the life of the soul."

== In psychology ==
=== Evolutionary view ===
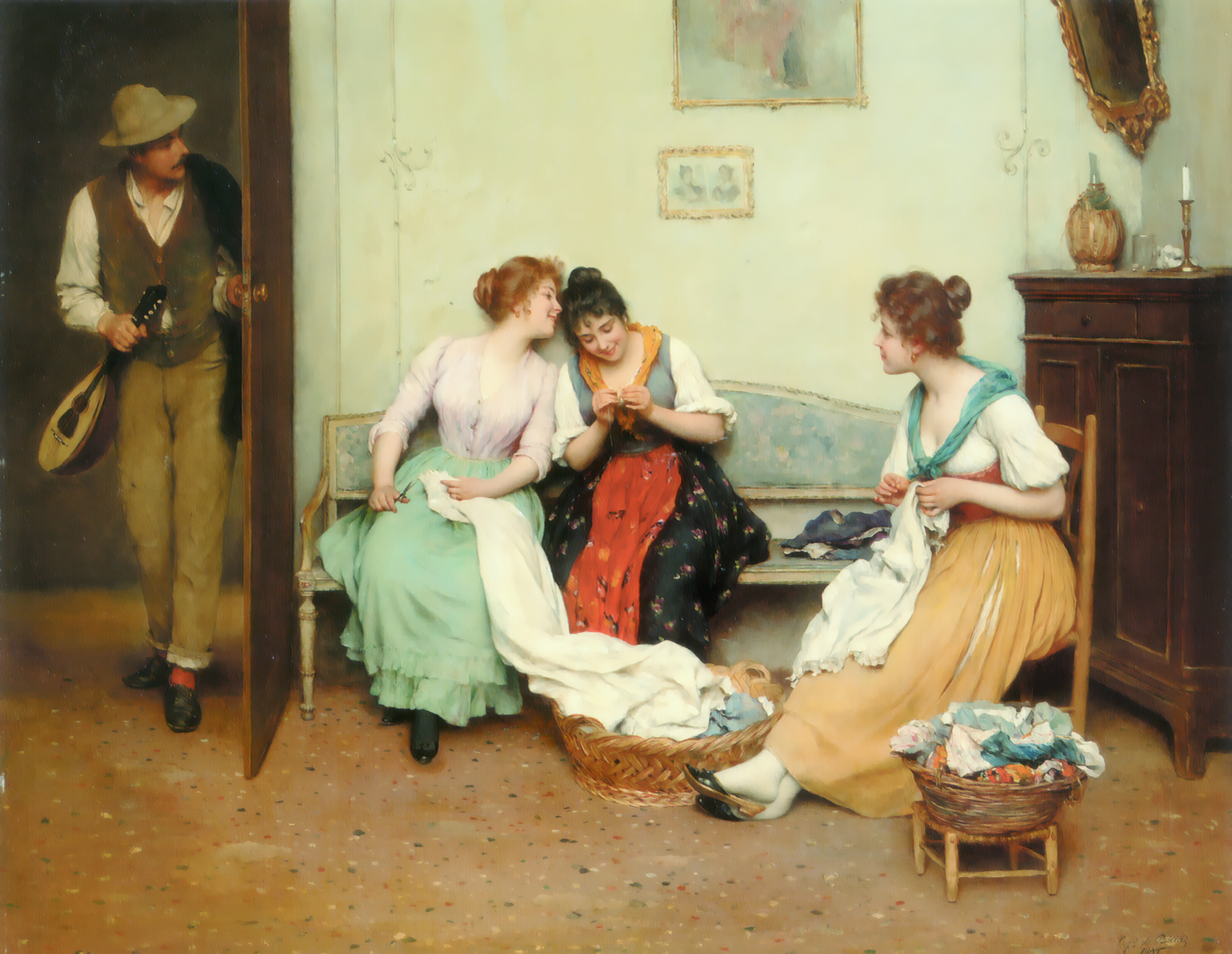
The Friendly Gossips (1901) by Eugene de Blaas

From Robin Dunbar's evolutionary theories, gossip originated to help bond the groups that were constantly growing in size. To survive, individuals need alliances; but as these alliances grew larger, it was difficult if not impossible to physically connect with everyone. Conversation and language were able to bridge this gap. Gossip became a social interaction that helped the group gain information about other individuals without personally speaking to them.

It enabled people to keep up with what was going on in their social network. It also creates a bond between the teller and the hearer, as they share information of mutual interest and spend time together. It also helps the hearer learn about another individual's behavior and helps them have a more effective approach to their relationship. Dunbar (2004) found that 65% of conversations consist of social topics.

Dunbar (1994) argues that gossip is the equivalent of social grooming often observed in other primate species. Anthropological investigations indicate that gossip is a cross-cultural phenomenon, providing evidence for evolutionary accounts of gossip.

There is very little evidence to suggest meaningful sex differences in the proportion of conversational time spent gossiping, and when there is a difference, women are only very slightly more likely to gossip compared with men. Further support for the evolutionary significance of gossip comes from a recent study published in the peer-reviewed journal, Science Anderson and colleagues (2011) found that faces paired with negative social information dominate visual consciousness to a greater extent than positive and neutral social information during a binocular rivalry task.

Binocular rivalry occurs when two different stimuli are presented to each eye simultaneously and the two percepts compete for dominance in visual consciousness. While this occurs, an individual will consciously perceive one of the percepts while the other is suppressed. After a time, the other percept will become dominant and an individual will become aware of the second percept. Finally, the two percepts will alternate back and forth in terms of visual awareness.

The study by Anderson and colleagues (2011) indicates that higher order cognitive processes, like evaluative information processing, can influence early visual processing. That only negative social information differentially affected the dominance of the faces during the task alludes to the unique importance of knowing information about an individual that should be avoided. Since the positive social information did not produce greater perceptual dominance of the matched face indicates that negative information about an individual may be more salient to our behavior than positive.

Gossip also gives information about social norms and guidelines for behavior, usually commenting on how appropriate a behavior was, and the mere act of repeating it signifies its importance. In this sense, gossip is effective regardless of whether it is positive or negative Some theorists have proposed that gossip is actually a pro-social behavior intended to allow an individual to correct their socially prohibitive behavior without direct confrontation of the individual. By gossiping about an individual's acts, other individuals can subtly indicate that said acts are inappropriate and allow the individual to correct their behavior (Schoeman 1994).

=== Perception of those who gossip ===
Individuals who are perceived to engage in gossiping regularly are seen as having less social power and being less liked than those who gossip less frequently. The type of gossip being exchanged also affects likeability, whereby those who engage in negative gossip are less liked than those who engage in positive gossip. In a study done by Turner and colleagues (2003), having a prior relationship with a gossiper was not found to protect the gossiper from less favorable personality-ratings after gossip was exchanged. In the study, pairs of individuals were brought into a research lab to participate. Either the two individuals were friends prior to the study or they were strangers scheduled to participate at the same time. One of the individuals was a confederate of the study, and they engaged in gossiping about the research assistant after she left the room. The gossip exchanged was either positive or negative. Regardless of gossip type (positive versus negative) or relationship type (friend versus stranger) the gossipers were rated as less trustworthy after sharing the gossip.

Walter Block has suggested that while gossip and blackmail both involve the disclosure of unflattering information, the blackmailer is arguably ethically superior to the gossip. Block writes: "In a sense, the gossip is much worse than the blackmailer, for the blackmailer has given the blackmailed a chance to silence him. The gossip exposes the secret without warning." The victim of a blackmailer is thus offered choices denied to the subject of gossip, such as deciding if the exposure of his or her secret is worth the cost the blackmailer demands. Moreover, in refusing a blackmailer's offer one is in no worse a position than with the gossip. Adds Block, "It is indeed difficult, then, to account for the vilification suffered by the blackmailer, at least compared to the gossip, who is usually dismissed with slight contempt and smugness."

Contemporary critiques of gossip may concentrate on or become subsumed in the discussion of social media such as Facebook.

== See also ==
- Blind item
- Bullying
- Defamation
- Gossip magazine
- Impression management
- Lashon hara
- Yenta
