= Lashon hara =

Halakhic term for derogatory speech

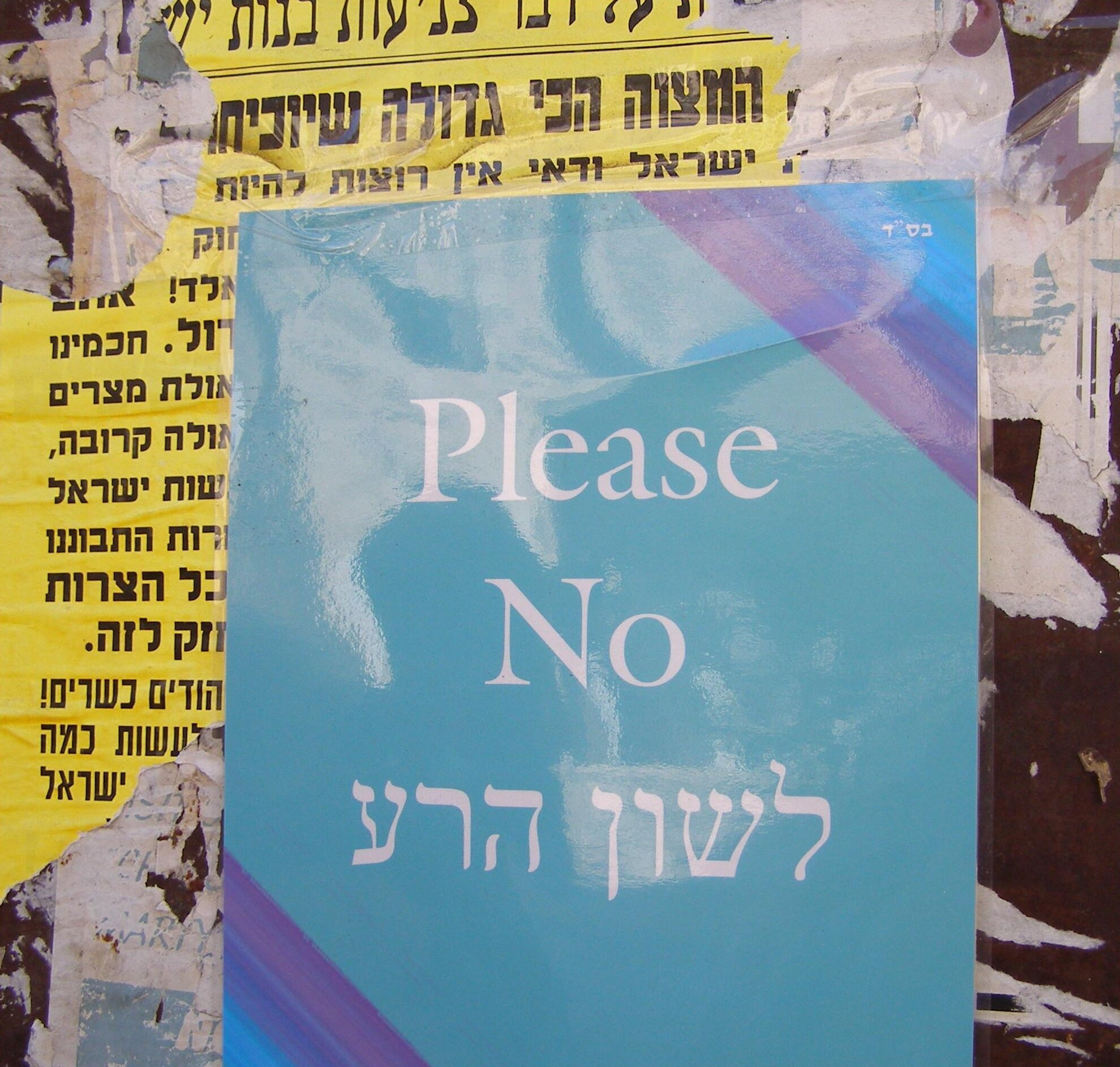
"No lashon hara" sign in the Mea Shearim quarter of Jerusalem

Lashon hara (or loshon horo, or loshon hora) (Hebrew: לשון הרע; "evil tongue") is the halakhic term for speech about a person or persons that is negative or harmful to them, even if it is true. It is speech that damages the person(s) who is talked about either emotionally or financially, or lowers them in the estimation of others. Shmiras halashon (guarding the tongue) is the positive practice to promote the quality of life and help combat and reduce lashon hara.

Lashon hara differs from the more severe prohibition of hotzaat shem ra, "making a bad name," in that hotzaat shem ra consists of untrue statements.

Lashon hara is considered to be a very serious sin in the Jewish tradition. The communicator of lashon hara (which is included in rechilut) violates the Torah prohibition of lo telech rachil b'ameicha, translating to "thou shalt not go up and down as a talebearer among thy people" (Leviticus 19:16 KJV).

== Definition ==
Speech is considered to be lashon hara (detraction) if it says something negative about a person or party, is not seriously intended to correct or improve a negative situation, and is true. Statements that fit this description are considered to be lashon hara, regardless of the method of communication that is used, whether it is through face-to-face conversation, a letter, telephone, or email, or even body language.

By contrast, hotzaat shem ra ("spreading a bad name") – also called hotzaat diba or motzi shem ra (lit. "putting out a bad name") – consists of lies, and is best translated as "slander" or "defamation" (calumny). Hotzaat shem ra is an even graver sin than lashon hara.

The act of gossiping is called rechilut, and is also forbidden by halakha.

== Etymology ==
The phrase consists of the noun lashon ("tongue"), the definite article ha, and the adjective ra ("evil"). The Hebrew noun lashon means "tongue" and – as in many languages – "speech" or "language". The phrase is generally translated as "evil speech". The term corresponds to the idea of an "evil tongue" in other cultures, such as the Latin mala lingua, the French mauvaise langue, and the Spanish mala lengua.

== Sources ==
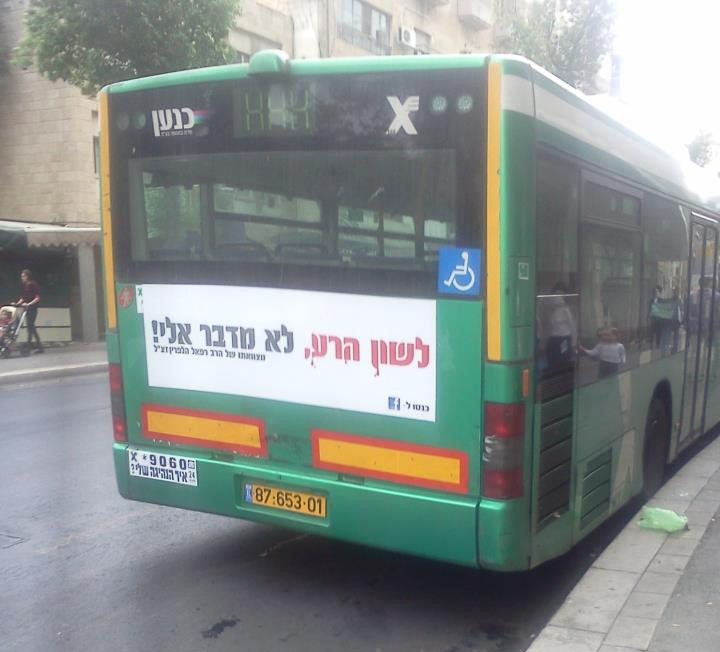
Advertisement on a bus saying "Lashon hara doesn't speak to me!" in Hebrew

The term lashon hara is not mentioned in the Tanakh, but "keep thy tongue from evil" (נְצֹר לְשֹׁונְךָ מֵרָע) occurs in Psalm 34:14. The Torah contains a general injunction against rekhilut (gossip): "Thou shalt not go up and down as a talebearer among thy people; neither shalt thou stand idly by the blood of thy neighbour: I am the LORD." The Biblical curse on one who "strikes his fellow in secret" is understood by the rabbis to refer to lashon hara, as it is a form of harming a person without their knowledge.

The Talmud lists lashon hara as one of the causes of the Biblical malady of tzaraath. Elsewhere, it declares that habitual speakers of lashon hara are not tolerated in God's presence. Similar strong denouncements can be found in various places in Jewish literature.

In Numbers chapter 12, Miriam gossips with her brother Aaron, questioning why Moses is more qualified to lead the Jewish people than anyone else. God hears and strikes her down with tzaraath. Miriam had to stay outside of the camp for a week due to the tzaraath. During this time, all of Israel waited for her.

== Chofetz Chaim ==
Rabbi Yisrael Meir Kagan wrote two major halakhic works on the evil tongue: Chofetz Chaim ("Desirer of Life", Psalms 34:13–14) and Shmirat HaLashon ("Guarding the tongue"), both 1873. The Chofetz Chaim lists 31 speech-related commandments mentioned in the Torah. An English adaptation, Guard Your Tongue (2002), anthologizes the teachings of these two books.

== Baalei lashon hara ==
The expression baalei lashon hara literally means "masters of evil tongue", and it refers to habitual speakers of lashon hara. The serious prohibition of communicating lashon harah relates foremost to somebody who incidentally did so. Someone who makes it his habit to talk lashon harah about others ("did you hear ...", "do you already know ...", etc.) is called a ba'al lashon hara. By repeatedly communicating so, lashon hara became an integral part of this person, and his/her sins are far more severe, because this person regularly creates a chillul hashem, a "desecration of the name of HaShem" (Leviticus 22:32). Lashon hara, rechilut and motzi shem ra are not accepted social tools in Judaism, because such behavior cuts the person who does in this manner off from many good things in the world around them. It is often phrased that one should stay away from people who communicate lashon hara, because any day, one will almost certainly become an object of derogatory communication by the same people.

== Exceptions ==
Reporting abuse, especially if the abuse is illegal, is not lashon hara, regardless of hashkafa.

There are times when a person is permitted or even required to disclose information whether or not the information is disparaging. For instance, if a person's intent in sharing negative information is for a to'elet, a positive, constructive, and beneficial purpose that may serve as a warning to prevent harm or injustice, the prohibition against lashon hara does not apply. Hotzaat shem ra, spouting lies and spreading disinformation, is always prohibited. Even with positive intentions, there are many important limitations regarding when it is permitted to speak lashon hara.

== Shmiras halashon ==
Shmiras halashon (guarding the tongue) is a practice in Judaism that is said to promote the quality of life and help combat and reduce lashon hara. It is a part of Jewish ethics known as mussar. King David once said, "He who loves life and would like to see good days, let him guard his tongue from evil and his lips from speaking deceit." King Solomon said, "Whoever guards his mouth and tongue guards himself from trouble."

The concepts and practice of Shmiras Halashon are found all through ancient Jewish writings, the modern practice was birthed and popularised by Rabbi Yisrael Meir Kagan (Chofetz Chaim).

=== History ===
- The first sin according to Torah is the serpent speaking evil about God and not practicing shmiras halashon, which led Eve to be deceived, bringing death.
- Joseph spoke negatively to his father, Jacob, about his brothers, causing them to hate him. This led them to sell him into slavery, and ultimately caused the Egyptian exile.
- The difficult slavery in Egypt is attributed to talebearers amongst the people and not guarding their tongues.
- The slander by Doeg, King Saul's chief shepherd and the head of the Sanhedrin, caused the massacre of nearly an entire city.
- The armies of King Saul lost their battles with the Philistines as a result of the slander that people spoke against (then future) King David.
- The armies of the notorious king Ahab were successful in their battles, despite the fact that they were idolatrous, because they guarded their tongue.
- The destruction of the Second Temple is attributed to lack of obeisance to shmiras halashon. The redemption and peace of the people is connected to being careful about shmiras halashon.

=== Torah commandments ===
Shmiras Halashon is divided into 31 Torah commandments which need to be observed.

- 17 negative commandments
- 14 positive commandments
- 4 curses

Keeping these commandments increases happiness and quality of life while carelessness causes destruction.

==== Negative commandments ====
- "You shall not go as a slanderer among your people; nor shall you stand against the blood of your neighbor; I am the Lord." (Leviticus 19:16)
- "You shall not raise a false report" (Exodus 23:1)
- "Take heed concerning the plague of leprosy. Leprosy came as a punishment for lashon hara." (Deuteronomy 24:8)
- "You shall not curse the deaf, nor put a stumbling block before the blind, but shall fear your G-d; I am the Lord. This is when you cause another one to sin as when you engage in evil talk." (Leviticus 19:14)

==== Positive commandments ====
- "Remember what the Lord your G-d did to Miriam by the way, after you came out of Egypt." (Deuteronomy 24:9)
- "And you shall love your neighbor as yourself; I am the Lord." (Leviticus 19:18)
- "You shall do no unrighteousness in judgment ... but in righteousness shall you judge your neighbor." (Leviticus 19:15)
- "And if your brother has become poor, and his means fail with you; then you shall relieve him; though he may be a stranger, or a sojourner; that he may live with you." (Leviticus 25:35)

==== Curses ====
- "Cursed be the one who hits his friend in secret. Anyone who does not watch his mouth does just this, he hits his friend behind his back, in secret." (Deuteronomy 27:24)
- "Cursed be the one who confounds the blind on the road. By making others [The innocent listeners] transgress the commandments of Shmiras Halashon you make them sin." (Deuteronomy 27:18)
- "Cursed be the one who will not establish the words of this Torah in order to do them. If a person habitually does not bother about God's commandments, he is the habit of repeating the transgression of constantly." (Deuteronomy 27:26)
- "Cursed be the one who hits his father or his mother. This forbids the speaking ill about one's father or mother." (Deuteronomy 27:16)

== Modern application ==
The concept of guarding one's tongue works in a family or corporate setting and increases peace and happiness.

== See also ==
- Detraction
- Public disclosure of private facts
