= Tefillat Tal =

Jewish prayer for dew

Tefillat Tal (Hebrew: תפילת טל, lit. 'Prayer for Dew') or Tiqqun haTal is a Jewish prayer recited on the first morning of Passover, forming the first part of the cantor's repetition of Mussaf. It marks the end of the rainy season in Israel, during which Jews pray for rain at every service.

Tal is recited using High Holiday tunes. The Torah ark remains open during the service, and the congregation stands. As on the High Holidays, the cantor wears a kittel during the service, and some congregants may as well. The Baal Shem Tov would reportedly wear a kittel, and this custom is especially common among Hasidic Jews.

== Morid hatal ==
After Tal, depending on tradition, some will recite a short prayer for dew ("morid hatal") at every service until prayers for rain resume with Tefillat Geshem on Shemini Atzeret. The Mishnah describes the geshem addition, but says nothing about tal. However, the Talmud does mention adding tal, albeit without a particular liturgy and not at any special time of year. It seems that mention of tal was seen as obligatory by early payytanim in Israel, and most Italian, British, Spanish and French medievals include it. However, no tal addition appears in the Geonic prayerbooks, and German medievals did not say tal .

== Order of the service ==
In the Ashkenazic rite, the prayer service generally consists of several distinct additions to the cantor's repetition of Mussaf. First, a stanza of piyyut by Eliezer beRabbi Qallir is added to the Avot blessing:

Hebrew Original

בְּדַעְתּוֹ אַבִּיעָה חִידוֹת.
בְּעַם זוּ בָּזוֹ בְּטַל לְהַחֲדוֹת.
טַל גֵּיא וּדְשָׁאֶיהָ לַחֲדוֹת.
דָּצִים בְּצִלּוֹ לְהֵחָדוֹת.
אוֹת יַלְדוּת טַל לְהָגֵן לְתוֹלָדוֹת:

English translation
By permission of God, I will recite hymns,

And so bring joy to this people with dew,

To refresh the land and its grasses with dew.

They dance, they who will be renewed,

[Abraham], of whose youth is dew a sign, will be shielded forever.

Then another stanza by Qallir is added to Gevurot,

Hebrew Original

תְּהוֹמוֹת הֲדוֹם לִרְסִיסוֹ כְסוּפִים.
וְכָל-נְאוֹת דֶּשֶׁא לוֹ נִכְסָפִים.
טַל זִכְרוֹ גְבוּרוֹת מוֹסִיפִים.
חָקוּק בְּגִישַׁת מוּסָפִים.
טַל לְהַחֲיוֹת בּוֹ נְקוּקֵי סְעִיפִים:

English translation
The depths of the Earth are eager for dew;

All the green pastures long for it.

We add a mention of dew to Gevurot,

Set into the Mussaf prayer.

Dew will restore life to those beneath the earth.

After this stanza an anonymous piyyut is usually recited, beginning Tal ten lirtzot artzekha. The piyyut follows a reverse-alphabetical acrostic.

| Hebrew Original | English translation |
|---|---|
| טַל תֵּן לִרְצוֹת אַרְצֶךָ. שִׁיתֵנוּ בְרָכָה בְדִיצֶךָ. רוֹב דָּגָן וְתִירוֹשׁ בְּהַפְרִיצֶךָ. קוֹמֵם עִיר בָּהּ חֶפְצֶךָ. בְּטַל: | Grant dew to favor Your land. Make us happy with blessing. Spawn masses of wine and grain. Rebuild your beloved city with dew. |
| טַל צַוֵּה שָׁנָה טוֹבָה מְעֻטֶּרֶת פְּרִי הָאָרֶץ לְגָאוֹן וּלְתִפְאֶרֶת עִיר כְּסֻּכָּה נוֹתֶרֶת שִׂימָהּ בְּיָדְךָ עֲטֶרֶת. בְּטָל: | O dew! Order a good and fruitful year, Let plants have pride and glory. The city which is left a ruin, Make her a crown in your hand with dew. |
| טַל נוֹפֵף עֲלֵי אֶרֶץ בְּרוּכָה מִמֶּגֶד שָׁמַיִם שַׂבְּעֵנוּ בְרָכָה לְהָאִיר מִתּוֹךְ חֲשֵׁכָה כַּנָּה אַחֲרֶיךָ מְשׁוּכָה. בְטָל: | Let dew fall on Your blessed land, From heavenly heights sate us with blessing, To bring light into darkness. Israel follows You with dew! |
| טַל יַעֲסִיס צוּף הָרִים טַעַם בִּמְאוֹדֶךָ מֻבְחָרִים חֲנוּנֶיךָ חַלֵּץ מִמַּסְגֵּרִים זִמְרָה נַנְעִים וְקוֹל נָרִים. בְּטָל: | Let dew sweeten the mountain honey, the taste of choice fruits, with Your might. Release your favored ones from their shackles, We will make music with dewy young voices. |
| טַל וָשׂוֹבַע מַלֵּא אֲסָמֵינוּ הֲכַעֵת תְּחַדֵּשׁ יָמֵינוּ דוֹד כְּעֶרְכְּךָ מַעֲמִיד שָׁמֵנוּ גַּן רָוֶה שִׂימֵנוּ. בְטָל: | Fill our silos with dew and plenty, Renew now our days! O Lord, set up our heavens— Like a luscious garden, make them with dew. |
| טַל בּוֹ תְבָרֵךְ מָזוֹן בְּמַשְׁמַנֵּינוּ אַל-יְהִי רָזוֹן אֲיֻּמָה אֲשֶׁר הִסַּעְתָּ כַצֹּאן אָנָּא תָפֵק לָהּ רָצוֹן. בְּטָל: | Bless our grains with dew, Let our flocks not waste away. Your people, that You lead like sheep, Please show them favor with dew! |

A wide variety of additional hymns may also be recited, depending on custom. Solomon ibn Gabirol composed several. The service ends with:

Hebrew Original
English translation

שָׁאַתָּה הוּא ה' אֱלֹהֵינוּ מַשִּׁיב הָרוּחַ וּמוֹרִיד הַטַּל:

For you are the LORD our God, who causes the wind to blow and the dew to fall!

לִבְרָכָה וְלֹא לִקְלָלָה. (אמן)
לְחַיִּים וְלֹא לַמָּוֶת. (אמן)
לְשׂוֹבַע וְלֹא לְרָזוֹן. (אמן)

For blessing and not curse (Amen),

For life and not death (Amen),

For satisfaction and not hunger (Amen).

The cantor then continues with the repetition of Mussaf.
