= Geshem (disambiguation) =

Geshem may refer to:

- Geshem (גשם), a Hebrew word for "rain," applied mostly to the rains which occur in Israel over the course of the fall and winter.
  - This half of the year is called in the Mishnah "yemot ha-geshamin" (Hebrew: ימות הגשמין, days of rains).
  - By extension, the word Geshem refers to the piyyutim for rain recited at the Musaf service of Shemini Atzeret marking the beginning of the rainy season in Israel.
- Geshem (Bible) or Gashmu, Arab leader who, along with Tobiah, opposed Nehemiah in the reconstruction of Jerusalem.
