= Piyyut =

Jewish liturgical poem

A piyyuṭ (plural piyyuṭim, Hebrew: פִּיּוּטִים / פיוטים, פִּיּוּט / פיוט pronounced [pijˈjut, pijjuˈtim]; from Koine Greek: ποιητής, romanized: poiētḗs, lit. 'poet') is a Jewish liturgical poem, usually designated to be sung, chanted, or recited during religious services. Most piyyuṭim are in Mishnaic Hebrew or Jewish Palestinian Aramaic, and most follow some poetic scheme, such as an acrostic following the order of the Hebrew alphabet or spelling out the name of the author.

Many piyyuṭim are familiar to regular attendees of synagogue services. For example, the best-known piyyuṭ may be Adon Olam "Lord of the World." Its poetic form consists of a repeated rhythmic pattern of short-long-long-long (the so-called hazaj meter). It is so beloved that it is often sung after many synagogue services after the ritual nightly recitation of the Shema and during the morning ritual of putting on tefillin. Another beloved piyyuṭ is Yigdal "May God be Hallowed," which is based upon the thirteen principles of faith set forth by Maimonides.

Scholars of piyyuṭ today include Shulamit Elizur and Joseph Yahalom, both of whom formerly taught at Hebrew University and are now retired.

The author of a piyyuṭ is known as a pay(e)ṭān (פיטן); the plural is pay(e)ṭanim (פיטנים).

== History ==
=== The Eretz Yisrael school ===
The earliest piyyuṭim date from classical antiquity but date as late as the Middle Ages: from the Talmudic (c. 70 – c. 500 CE) and Geonic periods (c. 600 – c. 1040). They were "overwhelmingly from the Land of Israel or its neighbor Syria, because only there was the Hebrew language sufficiently cultivated that it could be managed with stylistic correctness, and only there could it be made to speak so expressively." The earliest Jewish prayer manuscripts, which were found in the Cairo Geniza, often consist of piyyuṭim, as these were the parts of the liturgy that required to be written down: the wording of the basic prayers was generally known by heart, and there was supposed to be a prohibition of writing them down. It is not always clear from the manuscripts whether these piyyuṭim, which often elaborated the themes of the basic prayers, were intended to supplement or replace them or, indeed, whether they originated before the basic prayers had become fixed. The piyyuṭim, in particular those of Eleazar birabbi Qallir, were often in very cryptic and allusive language, with copious reference to midrash.

Initially, the word piyyuṭ designated every type of sacred poetry, but as usage developed, the term came to designate only poems of hymn character around the fourth or fifth centuries CE. The piyyuṭim were usually composed by a talented rabbinic poet, and depending on the piyyuṭ’s reception by the community determined whether it would pass the test of time. Looking at the composers of the piyyuṭim, one can see which family names were part of the Middle Eastern community and which hakhamim were prominent and well established. The composers of various piyyuṭim usually used acrostic forms to hint their identity in the piyyuṭ itself. Since siddurim were limited then, many piyyuṭim had repeating stanzas that the congregation would respond to, followed by the hazzan’s recitations.

The additions of piyyuṭim to the services were primarily used to embellish them and make them more enjoyable to the congregation. As to the origin of the piyyuṭ's implementation, there is a theory that this had to do with restrictions on Jewish prayer. Al-Samawal al-Maghribi, a Jewish convert to Islam in the twelfth century, wrote that the Persians prohibited Jews from holding prayer services. "When the Jews saw that the Persians persisted in obstructing their prayer, they invented invocations into which they admixed passages from their prayers (the piyyuṭ) … and set numerous tunes to them". They would assemble to read and chant the piyyuṭim at prayer time. The difference between that and prayer is that the prayer is without melody and is read only by the person conducting the service. In the recitation of the piyyuṭ, the cantor is assisted by the congregation in chanting melodies. "When the Persians rebuked them for this, the Jews sometimes asserted that they were singing, and sometimes [mourning over their situations]." When the Muslims took over and allowed Jews dhimmi status, prayer became permissible for the Jews. The piyyuṭ had become a commendable tradition for holidays and other joyous occasions. The use of piyyuṭ was always considered a Jewish specialty in Palestine: the Babylonian geonim made every effort to discourage it and restore what they regarded as the statutory wording of the prayers, holding that "any [hazzan] who uses piyyuṭ thereby gives evidence that he is no scholar". It is not always clear whether their main objection was to any use of piyyuṭim at all or only to their intruding into the heart of the statutory prayers.

For these reasons, scholars classifying the liturgies of later periods usually hold that the more a given liturgy uses piyyuṭim, the more likely it is to reflect Land of Israel influence as opposed to Babylonian (Lower Mesopotamian) influence. Sephardic liturgical framers took Geonic strictures seriously. For this reason, the early Jewish piyyuṭim, such as those of Yannai and Eleazar birabbi Qallir, do not survive in the Sephardic rite. However, they do in the Ashkenazi and Italian rites.

=== Middle Ages and early modernity ===
In the later Middle Ages, however, Andalusi Jewish poets such as Judah Halevi, Solomon ibn Gabirol, Abraham ibn Ezra and Moses ibn Ezra composed quantities of religious poetry, in correct Biblical Hebrew and strict Arabic metres. Many of these poems have been incorporated into the Sephardic rites, and to a lesser extent, the others, and may be regarded as a second generation of piyyuṭ.

Lurianic Kabbalah, which originated in the early modern Kabbalistic circle of Isaac Luria and his followers, used an adapted Sephardic liturgy but disapproved of Andalusi piyyuṭim, regarding them as spiritually inauthentic. They invoked the Geonic strictures to eliminate them from the service or move away from its core. Their disapproval did not extend to piyyuṭim of the early Jewish liturgical tradition of the Land of Israel, which they regarded as an authentic part of the Talmudic-rabbinic tradition. Luria himself went to Ashkenazi communities to recite piyyuṭim from the Eretz Yisrael school. Lurianists and their successors also wrote piyyuṭim of their own, such as Ya Ribon by Israel ben Moses Najara, the grandchild of an Andalusi emigrant.

No Sephardic community reinstituted the Eretz Yisrael piyyuṭim under the influence of the Sephardic-rite Kabbalists. Some Andalusi piyyuṭim survive in the Western Sephardic rite but were eliminated or moved in Sephardic Syrian and in rites from the Muslim world. Syrian Jews preserve some of them for extra-liturgical use as pizmonim.

== Well-known piyyuṭim ==
A chart of some of the best-known and most beloved piyyuṭim follows. This is by no means an exhaustive list, but it tries to provide a flavor of the variety of poetic schemes and occasions for which these poems were written. Many of the piyyuṭim marked as being recited on Shabbat are songs traditionally sung as part of the home ritual observance of Shabbat and also known as zemirot ("Songs/Melodies").

Name	Hebrew	English name	Poetic scheme	Recited on
Adir Bimlukha	אַדִּיר בִּמְלוּכָה	Strong In His Reign	Alphabetic acrostic	Passover
Adir Hu	אַדִּיר הוּא	Mighty is He	Alphabetic acrostic	Passover
Adir VeNa'or	אַדִּיר וְנָאוֹר	Mighty and Glorious	Alphabetic acrostic, each line ends with מִי אֵ-ל כָּמוֹךָ	Yom Kippur
Adon Haselichot	אֲדוֹן הַסְּלִיחוֹת	Lord of Forgiveness	Alphabetic acrostic	Every day during the month of Elul and during the Ten Days of Repentance
Adon Olam	אֲדוֹן עוֹלָם	Lord of the World	Hazaj metre (based on short-long-long-long foot)	Daily
Akdamut	אַקְדָּמוּת מִלִּין	Introduction	Double alphabetic acrostic, then spells out "Meir, son of Rabbi Yitzchak, may he grow in Torah and in good deeds. Amen, and may he be strong and have courage." The author was Rabbi Meir bar Yitzchak "Shatz"	Shavuot
Anim Zemirot/Shir haKavod	אַנְעִים זְמִירוֹת	I Shall Sing Sweet Songs	Double alphabetic acrostic	Shabbat and Festivals
Barukh El Elyon	בָּרוּךְ אֵל עֶלְיוֹן	Blessed Be God Most High	Acrostic spells "Baruch Chazak", or "Blessed be he, with strength", written by Baruch ben Samuel	Shabbat
Berah Dodi	בְּרַח דּוֹדִי		Every stanza begins with the word "Berah"	Passover
Devai Haser	דוי הסר		Acrostic spells "Dunash," the name of author Dunash ben Labrat.	Weddings and Sheva Brachot
D'ror Yikra	דְּרוֹר יִקְרָא	Freedom	Acrostic spells "Dunash," the name of author Dunash ben Labrat.	Shabbat
Ein Keloheinu	אֵין כֵּאלֹהֵינו		First letters of first 3 stanzas spell "Amen"	Shabbat and Festivals (Daily in the Sephardic tradition)
El Adon	אֵל אָדון		Alphabetic acrostic	Shabbat and Festivals as part of first blessing before the Shema
Eliyahu HaNavi	אֵלִיָּהוּ הַנָּבִיא		Alphabetic acrostic	Motza'ei Shabbat and Passover
El Nora Alila	אֵל נוֹרָא עֲלִילָה		Refrain: "At this hour of Ne'ilah". Acrostic spells Moshe chazak, referring to Moses ibn Ezra	Ne'ilah (conclusion of Yom Kippur)
Eli Tziyon	אֱלִי צִיּוֹן		Hazaj metre; alphabetic acrostic; each stanza begins with the word alei; each line ends with the suffix -eiha (meaning "her" or "of hers", referring to Jerusalem)	Tisha B'av
Geshem	תְּפִלַּת גֶּשֶׁם		Alphabetic acrostic; each stanza ends with standard alternating line	Sh'mini Atzeret
Hakafot	הקפות		Alphabetic acrostic	Simchat Torah
Hayom T'am'tzenu	היום תאמצנו also called הַיּוֹם הַיּוֹם		Alphabetic acrostic, each line ends "Amen"	Rosh Hashanah and Yom Kippur
Hoshanot	הוֹשַׁעְנוֹת		Alphabetic acrostic	Sukkot
Ki Hineh Kachomer	כִּי הִנֵּה כַּחֹמֶר		Refrain: "Recall the Covenant, and do not turn towards the Evil Inclination"	Yom Kippur
Ki Lo Na'eh	כִּי לוֹ נָאֶה		Alphabetic acrostic	Passover
Kol Meqadesh Shevi'i	כל מקדש שביעי			Shabbat
Lekha Dodi	לְכָה דּוֹדִי		Acrostic spells name of author, Solomon Alkabetz.	Shabbat evening
Mah Y'didut	מַה יְּדִידוּת		Acrostic spells Menucha ("rest"); refrain	Shabbat
Ma'oz Tzur	מָעוֹז צוּר		Acrostic spells name of author, "Mordechai"	Hanukkah
Mipi El	מִפִּי אֵל		Alphabetic acrostic	Shabbat and Simchat Torah
Menucha veSimcha	מְנוּחָה וְשִׂמְחָה		Acrostic spells name of author, "Moshe", likely Moses ben Kalonymus	Shabbat
Ohila la-El	אוֹחִילָה לָאֵל		Unrhymed; each line begins with aleph	High Holy Days
Shir El Nelam	שִׁיר אֵל נֶעְלָּם		Alphabetic acrostic spells name of author, Shmuel.	Purim Only recited by Polish Jews.
Shoshanat Ya'akov	שׁוֹשַׁנַּת יַעֲקֹב		Alphabetic acrostic	Purim
Tal			Reverse alphabetic acrostic; each stanza ends with "Tal"	Passover
Tzur Mishelo	צוּר מִשֶּׁלּוֹ		First stanza is the refrain	Shabbat
Unetanneh Tokef	וּנְתַנֶּה תּקֶף		Silluq of Mussaf for these days	Rosh Hashanah and Yom Kippur (in the Eastern Ashkenazic and Italian rites). In some Italian communities, also on Hoshana Rabbah. In the Western Ashkenazic rite, Rosh Hashanah only.
Ya Ribon	יָהּ רִבּוֹן		Acrostic spells "Israel", the author's (Israel ben Moses Najara) first name	Shabbat
Yedid Nefesh	יְדִיד נֶפֶש	Beloved of My Soul	Acrostic spells Tetragrammaton	Shabbat
Yigdal	יִגְדַּל		Metre	Daily
Yom Shabbaton	יוֹם שַבָּתוֹן		Acrostic spells "Yehudah", written by Yehudah Halevi	Shabbat
Yom Ze L'Yisra'el	יוֹם זֶה לְיִשְׂרַאֵל		Acrostic spells "Yitzhak", written by Yitzhak Salmah Hazan, although commonly misattributed to Rabbi Isaac Luria	Shabbat
Yom Ze Mekhubad	יוֹם זֶה מְכֻבָּד		Acrostic spells "Israel"	Shabbat

== Genres ==
Piyyutim have been written in many different genres and subgenres. Most of these are defined by the function that the given poem fulfills in the context of Jewish prayer service; but a few are defined by other criteria, such as content.

Yotzer sequence—a series of poems, which adorn the blessings surrounding the morning recitation of the Shema. Note that the Shema itself is always kept in its statutory form, and not adorned with poetry, because it is made up of passages taken straight from the Bible.

1. Guf yotzer (or just yotzer)—the first poem of the sequence, coming at the very beginning of the blessing Yotzer ohr. In a sequence written for a weekday, this is a very short poem, of one stanza, and leads straight to the conclusion of the blessing; parts 1a, 2, 3, and 4 are skipped. In a sequence written for a Sabbath or festival, this poem can be anywhere from about 12 lines to several hundred lines.
1b. Silluq le-yotzer. A "conclusion" to the guf yotzer, forming a bridge to the Qedusha in the middle of the blessing on the heavenly luminaries.
2. Ofan. A poem bridging between the first and second verses of the Qedusha.
3. Me'ora. A poem forming the bridge between the second verse of the Qedusha and the conclusion of the blessing on the luminaries.
4. Ahava. A poem leading into the conclusion of the blessing regarding God's love for the Jewish people.
(The Shema itself is recited here.)
5. Zulath. A poem leading from the beginning of the blessing after the Shema (about the truth of the Shema‘ and God's redemption of the Israelites from Egypt) to the verse "Mi Khamokha" ("Who is like unto Thee?"), Exodus 15:11.
6. Mi Khamokha. A poem leading from the verse "Mi Khamokha" (Ex. 15:11) to the verse "Adonai Yimlokh" (Ex. 15:18).
7. Ge'ulla. A poem leading from "Adonai Yimlokh" (Ex. 15:18) to the conclusion of the benediction about the truth of the Shema‘ and the redemption from Egypt. In 9th-11th century Middle Eastern yotzer sequences, the Ge'ulla is usually split into two smaller poems, the "Adonai Malkenu" and the "Ve‘ad Matai".

Qerova—a series of piyyuṭim, which adorn the blessings of the Amidah. There are a few types of these:

Shiv‘ata: A series of seven poems, of even length, to adorn the Amidah of a Sabbath or festival. Such Amidot have seven blessings, so there is one poem per blessing. (Note that these were written only for the amidot of Musaf and Minhah and Maariv; for the Shacharit service of a Sabbath or festival, the Amida would be adorned with a Qedushta. See below.)
Shemone Esreh: A series of eighteen poems, of even length, to adorn the Amidah of a weekday. Such Amidot have eighteen blessings, so there is one poem per blessing.
Qedushta: A series of poems adorning the first three blessings of the Shaharit) Amidah of a sabbath or festival. (Or Musaf of Rosh Hashana, or any of the four Amidot of the daytime of Yom Kippur. The Qedushta consists of several parts, each with their own names.

1. Magen
2. Mehayye
3. Meshallesh
4. "Piyyut 4" ("El Na")
5. "Piyyut 5"
6. Qiqlar
7. Rahit. (There may be several rahitim, in which case they are numbered 7a, 7b, 7c, et cetera.)
8. Silluq. A long piyyuṭ, often closer to rhyming prose than to any kind of metrical poetry. The silluq, at its conclusion, leads into the first verse of the Kedushah prayer.
9: Qedusha-piyyuṭim. These poems, often absent from Qedushta'ot, were written to be recited between the verses of the Kedushah.

Qedushat Shiv‘ata
Qedushat Shemone Esreh

Some Shiv‘atot, almost exclusively for great festivals, have expansions:

Guf -- an expansion in the fourth blessing of a festival Amidah. This is the central blessing of the festival Amidah, and the only one whose theme is the festival itself.
Dew (Tal) or Rain (Geshem) expansion: inserted into the second blessing of the mussaf Amidah of the first day of Passover or of Shemini Atzeret, which are the first days that prayers for dew and rain are recited in the summer and winter respectively.

Other types:

Purim expansions
Qinot
Selihot (many later communities moved these out of the qerova, or out of the Amida entirely, and recited them in less formal liturgical contexts)
Zemer (usually for the Sabbath).
Sukkot#Hoshanot
Nishmat
Azharot
Avoda
Ketubba for Shavuot
Targum piyyuṭim
Maarivim - Piyyuṭim recited for the Shema at Maariv. Although in the classical era of piyyuṭ, these were recited on many occasions, in European communities, they are recited exclusively on Jewish holidays.
Bikkur (also known as Tosefet Le-ma‘ariv -- an expansion at the end of a sequence of ma‘ariv piyyuṭim; found only in Ashkenaz and Romania.)
Elohekhem
Magen Avot piyyuṭim
Piyyutified blessing
Piyyutified Birkat Hamazon
Siyyum Le-hallel
El Adon and Shevaḥ Notnim

== See also ==
- David Hakohen
- Jewish prayer
- Scholars of Piyyut
