= Elohekhem =

Elohekhem (Hebrew: אלהיכם) is a genre of piyyut, which arose among Jews in 12th-century Germany, to be inserted in the Qedusha of the Musaf prayer. Several dozen poems of this genre were written over the course of the twelfth and thirteenth centuries.

This name of this genre, meaning “your God”, comes from the closing word of Numbers 15:41: “...to be your God; I am the Lord your God.” A quote from the end of this verse appears in the Qedusha liturgy of Musaf in most Jewish prayer rites, including the Ashkenazic Rite. The poets of Medieval Western Ashkenaz composed the Elohekhem piyyutim to be inserted in the liturgy immediately after this Biblical quote. These poems all begin with the word “Elohekhem”, thus creating an anadiplosis with the last word of the Biblical quote. The Elohekhem genre is miniaturistic; the poems average a length of six to seven lines (though some are as short as four, and some as long as eighteen).

== Liturgical use in printed rites ==
Of the several dozen piyyutim of this genre that were written in the Middle Ages, eight of them survived into the printed Western Ashkenazic rite, and most or all of them are still recited in synagogues of that rite even today. These are: "Elohekhem Shofeṭ Ẓedeq" (אלהיכם שופט צדק), for Shabbat Shuva; "Elohekhem Yashiv Be-shalem" (אלהיכם ישיב בשלם), for the Sabbath in the middle of Sukkoth; "Elohekhem Yazriaḥ Shimsho" (אלהיכם יזריח שמשו), for a Sabbath that falls on Rosh Ḥodesh; "Elohekhem Yaskil `Avdo" (אלהיכם ישכיל עבדו), for Shabbat Bereshit (the Sabbath on which the annual reading of the Torah is begun, with the Torah-portion Bereshit); "Elohekhem Yishlaḥ Meshiḥo" (אלהיכם יזרח משיחו), for the Sabbath that falls during Hanukkah; "Elohekhem Yosif Yado" (אלהיכם יוסיף ידו), for Shabbat Naḥamu; "Elohekhem Shikhno Sam" (אלהיכם שכנו שם), for the Sabbath on which a wedding is being celebrated in the community; and "Elohekhem Ani Zokher Ha-berit" (אלהיכם אני זוכר הברית), for the Sabbath on which a berit mila, circumcision, is performed. Except for the piyyut for Berit Milah, each of these poems is signed either Judah (יהודה) or Samuel (שמואל) in the acrostic, presumably the names of the authors, but it is unclear who these authors are, for both of these names were popular in medieval Ashkenaz.
