= Adir Bimlukha =

Jewish liturgical poem

"Adir Bimlukha" (Hebrew: אַדִּיר בִּמְלוּכָה, romanized: ʾAddīr Bimlūxā, lit. 'Mighty in Kingship'), also known as Ki Lo Naʾeh (Hebrew: כִּי לוֹ נָאֶה, romanized: Kī Lō Nāʾē, lit. 'For to Him it is Fitting'), is a Hebrew Jewish piyyut (liturgical poem), usually recited near the end of the Passover Seder. The piyyut is an acrostic following the Hebrew alphabet, with a fixed verse structure, and a chorus after each verse. Adir Bimlukha is written as a hymn of praise to God, and is based on numerous Biblical verses. The refrain is based on a midrash from Genesis Rabbah 6:2.

== History ==
The earliest sources for Adir Bimlukha are 13th century manuscripts from Germany, which is the milieu in which this piyyut was likely composed. The composer is unknown.

The book Etz Chaim of Jacob ben Judah of London has a version of Adir Bimlukha with four extra verses, acrostically spelling out the name Jacob (Hebrew: יעקב).

== Recitation ==
Most Jewish communities sing Adir Bimlukha on both nights of Passover shortly before drinking the fourth cup of wine. Tunisian Jews sing this poem on Simchat Torah.
