= Ohila la-El =

Medieval Jewish liturgical poem

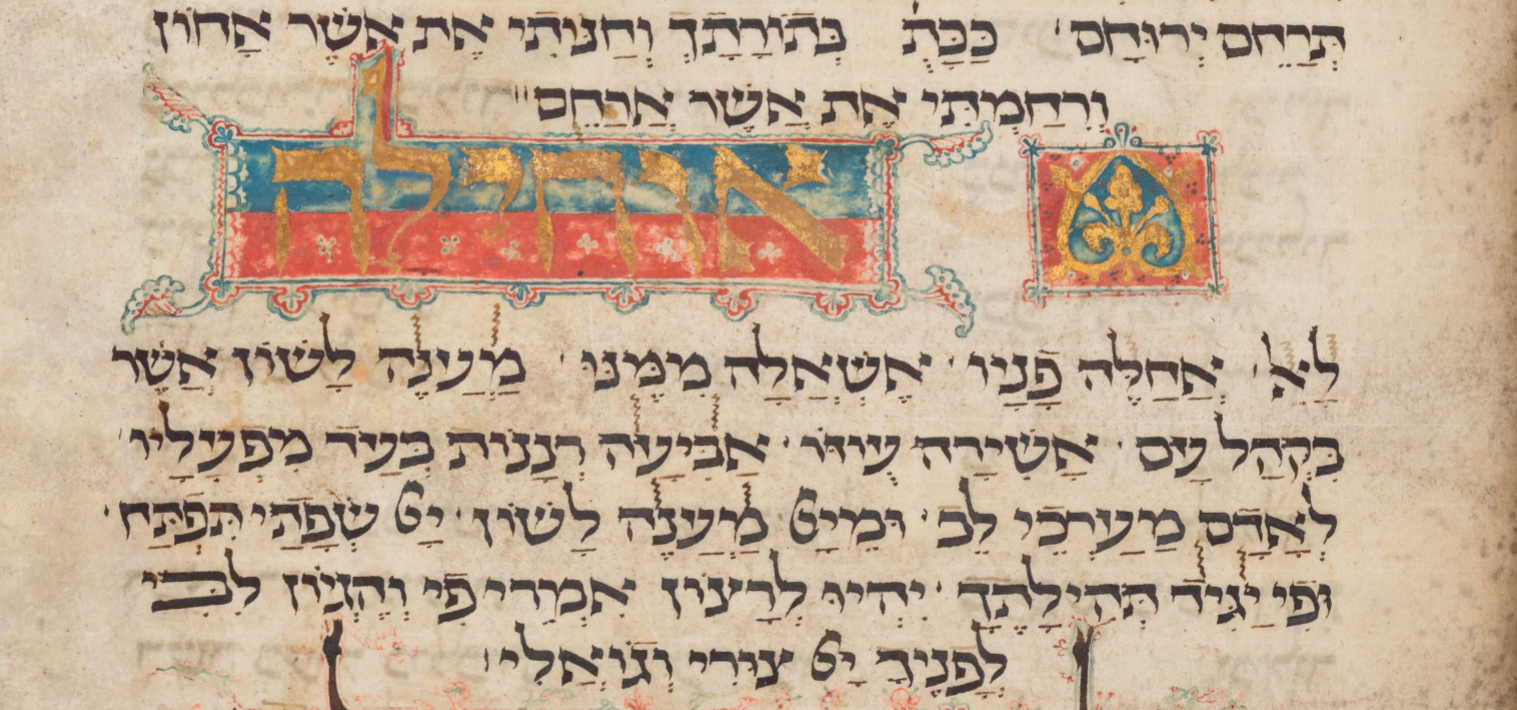
Ohila la-El in the Amsterdam Machzor (1250s)

Ohila la-El (Note: Also Ochila, Ochilah, Ohilah; lael, lakel, la-kel.) (I will wait to god) is a medieval piyyut of unknown authorship, recited on Rosh Hashanah and Yom Kippur during Mussaf.

== Background ==
The piyyut comprises four unrhymed lines, each beginning with the letter aleph. After the piyyut various Biblical verses are recited, including (depending on the liturgical tradition) Proverbs 16:1, Psalm 51:17, Psalm 19:15, and Psalm 119:12.

The identity of the payytan is unknown, but from the piyyut's wide propagation and lack of rhyme, common to the earliest piyyutim, we may conclude that it dates to the pre-Classical period. It is similar in style to the piyyutim of Yose ben Yose (4th-5th century CE). Accordingly, the Academy of the Hebrew Language assigns it a date before 600 CE.

== Liturgical placement ==
Similar to other piyyutim recited by the cantor on the High Holy Days, such as Misod Hakhamim uNvonim and Hineni heAni meMa'as, the piyyut asks God for permission to pray on behalf of the congregation. It is only said by the cantor, and not by a lone congregant. According to Yom Tov of Seville, "they established that the cantor should include Ohila la-El in his prayers, which the individual does not say, and that he should do so at the beginning of Malkhiot in order that he not release informed congregants from any obligation except that of Malkhiot, Shofrot, and Zikhronot". According to David Abudarham, "Internal evidence proves that Ohila la-El is not to be said by individuals, for it says "in this great assembly I will praise His strength.

According to the custom of Ashkenazi Jews, the piyyut is recited during the cantor's repetition of Mussaf—on Rosh haShanah before the teqiot piyyutim, and on Yom Kippur before the Seder haAvodah. Sephardic Jews used to do the same, but over the last few centuries they have begun instead to recite it as an introduction to the cantor's repetition as part of an effort to avoid piyyutim in the interior of the repetition.

== Text of the Piyyut ==
Hebrew Original

אוֹחִילָה לָאֵל אֲחַלֶּה פָנָיו
אֶשְׁאֲלָה מִמֶּנּוּ מַעֲנֵה לָשׁוֹן
אֲשֶׁר בִּקְהַל עָם אָשִׁירָה עֻזּוֹ
אַבִּיעָה רְנָנוֹת בְּעַד מִפְעָלָיו

English translation
I put my faith in the Lord, I implore Him

I ask Him for eloquent speech

For in this great assembly (Note: According to Abudarham, cf. Ps. 40:10. Or "For in this assembly of [His] nation" cf. Judges 20:2, following Goldschmidt. David b. Judah (Or Zarua II, c. 1300 CE) gives a Qabbalistic explanation f. 80b, "The attribute of wisdom among the many levels".) I will praise His strength

I will set His works to song.

== Musical settings ==
In addition to the traditional melodies, the piyyut has been set to modern tunes, including one by Hillel Paley. It has been performed with original music by Lipa Schmeltzer, Yitzchak Meir, and Ishay Ribo.
