= Mipi El =

Jewish liturgical poem

"Mipi El" (Hebrew: מִפִּי אֵל, romanized: Mippī ʾĒl, lit. 'From the Mouth of God'), also known as "Mipi Kel", is an anonymous Hebrew Jewish piyyut (liturgical poem), sung during the Hakafot of Simchat Torah. The song is sung in Ashkenazi communities during the fourth hakkafafah.

== Poetic Structure ==
The poem is an acrostic, following a specific structure of each verse:

אֵין אַדִּיר כַּה' וְאֵין בָּרוּךְ כְּבֶן עַמְרָם.
אֵין גְּדוֹלָה כַּתּוֹרָה וְאֵין דּוֹרְשָׁהּ כְּיִשְׂרָאֵל (There is none more awesome than Adonai and there is none more blessed than the Son of Amram. There is none greater than the Torah, and none more righteous than Israel)

After each verse, a refrain is sung: מִפִּי אֵל יְבֹרַךְ כָּל יִשְׂרָאֵל. (From God’s mouth, from God’s mouth, all of Israel shall be blessed)
