= Ki Hine KaKhomer =

Jewish liturgical poem

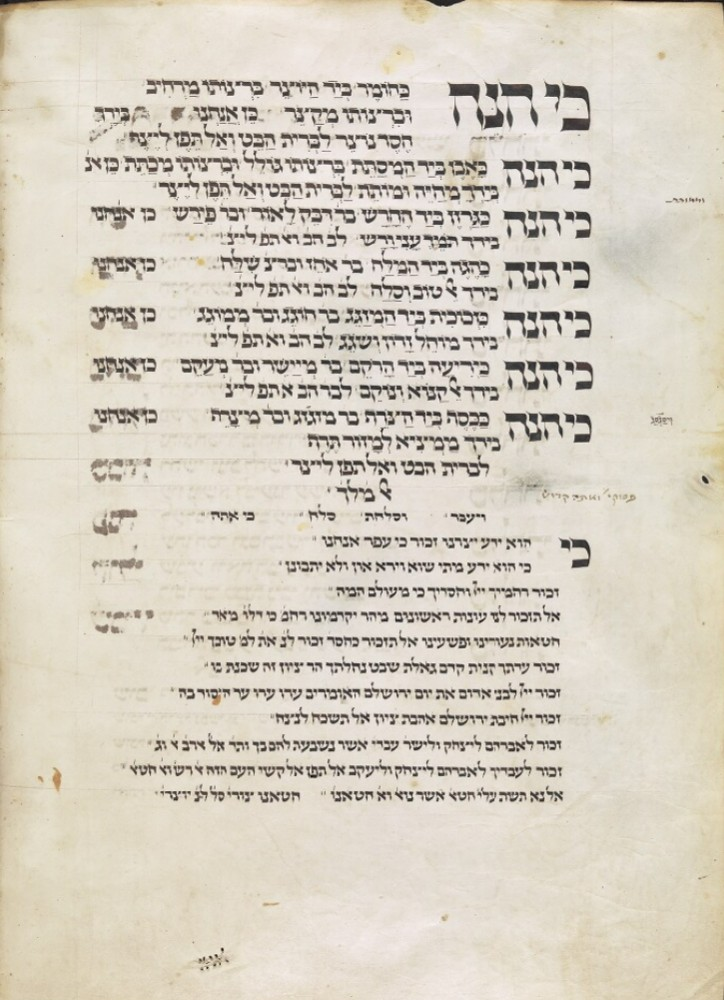
Page from the Lod cycle

Ki Hine KaKhomer (Hebrew: כִּי הִנֵּה כַּחֹמֶר, romanized: kī hinnē kāḥōmer, lit. 'Like clay'), is a Hebrew piyyut (liturgical poem) which is recited in Ashkenazi communities. Eastern Ashkenazim recite the prayer in the Ma'ariv service of Yom Kippur, while Western Ashkenazim recite it during the Ten Days of Repentance, between Rosh HaShannah and Yom Kippur. Gratz College professor Saul P. Wachs calls Ki Hine KaKhomer "one of the most beloved" of all the Piyyutim. The origin and author of Ki Hine KaKhomer are unknown. The piyyut is first found in Ashkenazi machzorim dating back to the twelfth century. The name of the piyyut comes from the verse in Jeremiah where the Jews are compared to clay in the hands of the potter.

== Structure ==
The piyyut is an acrostic beginning with the second verse. Today, the acrostic is missing several verses (...כִּי הִנֵּה כָּאֶבֶן... כִּי הִנֵּה כַּגַּרְזֶן), and continues only until the letter mem (מ).

Each verse compares the relationship between God and the Jews to the relationship between professionals and their tools (clay to a potter, a stone to a stonemason, etc.).

Each verse follows the same poetic structure, and finishes with the refrain "Heed the covenant and not the accuser!" (Hebrew: לַבְּרִית הַבֵּט וְאַל תֵּֽפֶן לַיֵּֽצֶר), which refers to the covenant of the Thirteen Attributes of Mercy.

The poem is the first use of the word הגה for rudder or helmsman's wheel in the Hebrew language.
