= Eliyahu HaNavi (piyyut) =

Jewish liturgical poem

"Eliyahu HaNavi" (Hebrew: אֵלִיָּהוּ הַנָּבִיא, romanized: ʾĒliyyāhū Hannāvī, lit. 'Elijah the Prophet') is a Hebrew Jewish piyyut sung by Ashkenazi (and some Sefardi) communities on Motza'ei Shabbat. The author of the piyyut is unknown, but it was likely written before the 11th century.

== Content ==
The refrain of the piyyut is an entreaty for Elijah the Prophet to return with the Messiah. This is based on an interpretation of Malachi 3:23, suggesting that Elijah would return before the coming of the Messiah. Each verse describes and praises the prophet.

== Tunes ==
The most common tune used today first appeared in print in the Braunschweig-Tempel Hymnbook published in Germany. A similar tune is found in Arno Nadel's Sabbatgesange published in Berlin in 1937. Despite the early appearance of this tune in Germany, the rhythmic pattern suggests a Polish-Lithuanian provenance. Other tunes are found in ethnomusicological publications and Yizkor books, but are seldom heard today.

== Sitz im Leben ==
The piyyut is sung on Motza'ei Shabbat once Shabbat has ended.

It is also sung in Ashkenazi communities during the opening of the door for Elijah during the Passover seder.

== Poetic structure ==
The first word of every verse is אִישׁ (a man), referring to Elijah the Prophet. The second word of each verse forms an alphabetical acrostic. A refrain is sung in between triplets of verses.
