= Ya Ribon =

Jewish music

Ya Ribon (Note: Also: Yah Ribbon, Kah Ribbon, Ya Ribbon, Yah Ribon, Kah Ribon, Ka Ribbon, Ka Ribon.) (Imperial Aramaic: יָהּ רִבּוֹן עַלַם, romanized: yāh ribbôn ʿalam, lit. 'Yah, eternal lord') is an Aramaic piyyut by the 16th-century payytan Israel ben Moses Najara of Gaza, first published in his 1586 work זמירות ישראל "Songs of Israel". Ashkenazi Jews traditionally sing it at table after the Friday night meal and Sephardi Jews sing it (sometimes in Ladino) among the Baqashot. The piyyut, originally sung to an Arab melody, has been set to dozens of tunes, both ancient and modern. "The 21st century Shabbat table", says one modern writer, "is incomplete without the singing of the universal Yah Ribon."

== Form and content ==
Najara's best-known work, this piyyut was written in Aramaic, and the first letters of the verses form the author's name ISRAEL by acrostic. An example of the strophic model known in Arabic as muwashshah, the piyyut is composed of equal metrical units and the refrain "Yah, lord for ever and ever/O King, you are king of kings" is repeated after every verse. The piyyut is largely formed from the language of Daniel and incorporates quotes from the Zohar. Unusually for a Sabbath table song, it makes no mention of the Sabbath or its rituals, because it was not originally intended for the Sabbath. Apparently it entered the Sabbath repertoire because of similarity in language to the Sabbath zemirot of Isaac Luria. Max D. Klein's Seder Avodah prayerbook substitutes "who served Thee, Lord, in every age" for the literal "whom Thou chosest from all nations" in what Theodor Gaster understood as a "romantic idealization of the past.

== Words ==
| Aramaic Original | Translation |
|---|---|
| יָהּ רִבּון עַלַּם וְעַלְמַיָּא // אַנְתְּה מַלְכָּא מֶלֶךְ מַלְכַיָּא (Note: cf. Dan. 2:37; here as there the pronoun is pronounced ʾant.) עוֹבָדֵי גִיבַרְתָּךְ וְתִמְהַיָּא // שְׁפַר קָדָמַי לְהַחֲוָיָּא (Note: cf. Dan. 3:32) | Yah, lord for ever and ever // O King, you are king of kings. Your mighty deeds and wonders // are pleasant for me to relate. |
| שְׁבָחִין אֲסַדֵּר צַפְרָא וְרַמְשָׁא // לָךְ אֱלָהּ קַדִּישָׁא בָּרֵא כָּל נַפְשָׁא עִירִין קַדִּישִׁין וּבְנֵי נַשָׁא // חֵיוַת בָּרָא וְעוֹף שְׁמַיָּא (Note: cf. Dan. 2:38) | I will order praises to you day and night // To you, holy God, Creator of all life -- The holy angels and the humans // The beasts of the field and the fowl of the heavens. |
| רַבְרְבִין עוֹבָדָךְ וְתַקִּיפִין (Note: cf. Dan. 3:33) // מַכִּיךְ רַמַיָּא זְקִיף כְּפִיפִין לוּ יְיחֵי גְבַר שְׁנִין אַלְפִין // לָא יֵעוּל גִיבַרְתָּךְ בְּחוּשְׁבְּנַיָּא | Many are your deeds and powerful // Humbling the lofty, straightening the bent. Were a man to live a thousand years // He could not envision your might. |
| אֱלָהָא דִילֵהּ (Note: cf. Dan. 5:18)יְקַר וּרְבוּתָא // פְּרוֹק יַת עָנָךְ (Note: cf. Dan. 6:23) מִפּוּם אַרְיְוָתָא וְאַפֵּיק עַמָּךְ מִגּוֹ גָּלוּתָא // עַמָּא דִי בְחַרְתָּ מִכָּל אוּמַיָּא | O God who has greatness and glory // Rescue your flock from the mouth of the lion! And free your people from exile // The people whom you selected above all the nations. |
| לְמַקְדְּשָׁךְ תּוּב וּלְקֹדֶשׁ קוּדְשִׁין // אֲתַר דִּי בֵּיהּ יִיחְדוּן רוּחִין וְנַפְשִׁין יְזַמְּרוּן לָךְ שִׁירִין וְרַחֲשִׁין // בִּירוּשְׁלֵם קַרְתָּא דְשׁוּפְרַיָּא | Return to your sanctum, and your Holy of Holies // The place where spirits and souls rejoice. They will sing you songs and hymns // In Jerusalem, the city of beauties. |
