= Adir VeNa'or =

Jewish liturgical poem

"Adir VeNa'or" (Hebrew: אַדִּיר וְנָאוֹר, romanized: ʾAddīr VeNā'ōr, lit. 'Mighty and Enlightened') is an anonymous Hebrew Jewish piyyut (liturgical poem), recited in many Jewish communities as part of the Amidah prayer on Yom Kippur. The title is an epithet for God, and is based on Psalms 76:5.

According Edwin Seroussi, the piyyut Adir VeNa'or originated as part of the Sefardi liturgy, and entered the Ashkenazi rite through contact between Portuguese Jews in Germany with Ashkenazim. Geoffrey Goldberg, however, argues that the piyyut existed in the Ashkenazi liturgy, but a Sefardi tune was adopted later adopted in Ashkenazi Europe through contact.

== Poetic structure ==
The first and third words of each verse form an acrostic. After each verse, a refrain "who is a God like You?" (מִי אֵ-ל כָּמוֹךָ) from Micah 7:18 is recited.

Eastern European Jewish communities traditionally skip the 6th (כובש) through 10th (קרוב) verses.

The piyyut does not rhyme, and therefore apparently should be dated to the early classical period of piyyutim (before the 6th century CE). As further testimony to the antiquity of the poem, it appears in Machzorim of various Jewish communities throughout the world. The piyyut is found in the Seder R. Amram of the ninth century CE. Despite this, few copies have been identified in the Cairo Geniza.
