= Adon HaSelikhot =

Jewish liturgical poem

"Adon HaSelikhot" (Hebrew: אֲדוֹן הַסְּלִיחוֹת, romanized: ʾĂdōn Has-Sĕlīḥōṯ, lit. 'Master of Forgiving') is an anonymous Hebrew Jewish piyyut (liturgical poem), recited in many Sefardi and Mizrahi Jewish communities during the Selichot service of Ten Days of Repentance between Rosh HaShanah and Yom Kippur.

Sephardic recitation of Adon HaSelichot
Sephardic recitation of Adon HaSelichot (in the Maqam Nahawand Mode). Recorded during Selichot services in the Ades Synagogue of Jerusalem of the Jews of Aleppo in 1982.

== Poetic structure ==
Every second word of each verse form an alphabetic acrostic (אֲדוֹן הַסְּלִיחוֹת בּוֹחֵן לְבָבוֹת...). After each verse, a refrain "We have sinned before you, have mercy on us" (חָטָאנוּ לְפָנֶיךָ רַחֵם עָלֵינוּ) is recited.
