= Yotzer ohr =

Jewish morning prayer

Yotzer ohr (Creator of light), also known as Birkat yotzer (the yotzer blessing) or Birkat Yotzer Or, is the first of the two blessings recited before the Shema during Shacharit, the morning religious services of Judaism.

.בָּרוּךְ אַתָּה יְיָ אֱלֹהֵנוּ מֶלֶךְ הָעוֹלָם, יוֹצֵר אוֹר וּבוֹרֵא חשֶׁךְ, עֹשֶֹה שָׁלוֹם וּבוֹרֵא אֶת הַכֹּל... בָּרוּךְ אַתָּה, יְיָ, יוֹצֵר הַמְּאוֹרוֹת

Translation:

Blessed are you, LORD our God, King of the universe, who forms light and creates darkness, who makes peace and creates all things... Blessed are you, LORD, who forms light.

According to a Midrash, Adam and Eve were the first people to recite this blessing when they were in the Garden of Eden.

Judaism recognizes that the sun is central to life. It is the sun that provides light that is needed for all life on earth, and Birkat Yotzer Or is a blessing thanking God for the sun.

== Themes ==
The first verse comes from the Book of Isaiah 45:7. It is said to correspond with the first paragraph of the Shema.

The blessing has two themes. The first is the spiritual one, in which God's Divine Wisdom expressing itself in a cosmic order. The second is that of the angels, in which the praises of the angels are expressed. It is during the part that kedusha is included. Unlike the kedusha during the Amidah, which is only recited in the presence of a minyan, this kedusha is recited even when praying in private.

The main theme of the blessing pertains to light. Light was the first thing that God created, according to the Book of Genesis, and it is light that provides life to all. The difference between light and darkness is compared to the difference between good and evil.

== Shabbat and weekday versions ==
A somewhat expanded version is recited on Shabbat as opposed to other days.

The weekday version (Hameir la'aretz (He Who illuminates)) contains a single paragraph with an acrostic in which each of 22 consecutive words begin with a letter of the Hebrew alphabet, covering all 22 letters in order. In the Ashkenazic rite, the weekday version is recited on Yom Tov, and all other special days which do not fall on the sabbath.

On Shabbat (and holidays as well in the Sephardic tradition), a longer version of the blessing is recited, with the same beginning followed by the paragraph Hakol yodukha. This paragraph is followed by an acrostic song called El Adon in which each verse begins with a different letter of the Hebrew alphabet. The third and final paragraph (la-el asher shavat) is a reminder that God is the creator of rest and peace on Shabbat.

In the Ashkenazic rite, on Festivals and many special Sabbaths, a piyyut (Yotzer) is recited following the opening line of the Blessing. These piyyutim are omitted today in most - but not all - communities.
