= Kittel =

Jewish religious men's garment

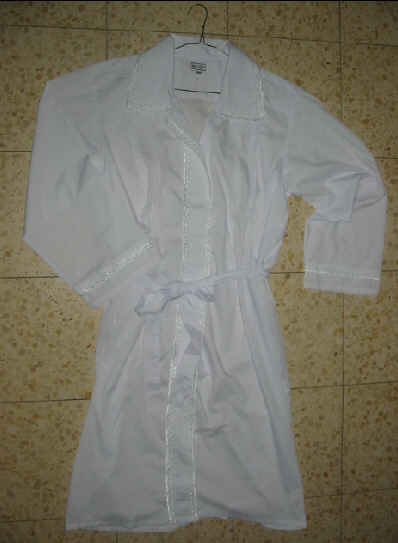
A kittel

A kittel (Yiddish: קיטל, romanized: kitl) is a white linen or cotton robe worn by some religious Ashkenazi Jews on holidays, in the synagogue or at home when leading the Passover seder. Bridegrooms sometimes wear kittels. It is also customary for Jews to be buried in a kittel, at which time it is referred to as a tachrichim.

== History ==
In Ashkenazic tradition, married men wear a kittel in the synagogue on Yom Kippur. In less-traditional synagogues, religious Jews—both men and women—wear a kittel. Some wear a kittel when leading the Passover Seder.

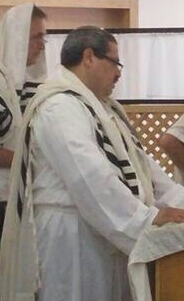

In some communities, the hazzan wears a kittel on the first night of Selichot, on Hoshana Rabbah or the seventh day of the Jewish holiday of Sukkot, the musaf prayers of Shemini Atzeret and the first day of Passover, where the Geshem (prayers for rain or dew) are recited.

In some communities, a bridegroom wears a kittel on his wedding day.

In some communities, it is known by the Western Yiddish term sargenes, related to the Old French serge as well as Latin sericum. The sargenes is worn like a tachrichim, covering the head and face.

== Symbolism ==
As a tachrichim or burial shroud, the kittel signifies simple attire that assures equality for all in death. Because Jewish law dictates that the dead are buried without anything else in the coffin other than simple linen clothes, a kittel has no pockets.

The wearing of a kittel on the High Holidays is symbolically linked to its use as tachrichim and to the verse "our sins shall be made as white as snow" (Isaiah 1:18). The white color is said to symbolize purity, which partly explains its use during weddings. It is also felt to signify unity with the bride (who also wears white) and the beginning of a new life together. Another reason it is worn at the wedding is because it has no pockets, showing that the couple is marrying for love, not for what they possess.
