= Geshem =

Geshem (גשם) is a Hebrew word for "rain," and is the name of a prayer for rain recited on the Jewish holiday of Shemini Atzeret.

== Overview ==
In Israel, rain falls mostly in the fall and winter; this half of the year is called in the Mishnah "yemot ha-geshamim" (days of rains). On Shemini Atzeret, which is the last holiday before the beginning of this rainy season, traditional Jews begin mentioning rain in their prayers (adding the phrase "He causeth the wind to blow and the rain to descend").

"Geshem" is the name of a set of piyyutim recited by religious Jews in the Mussaf (additional) prayer for Shemini Atzeret, which is read and sung as an introduction to the first mention of rain in the prayers. In the Eastern Ashkenazic rite, these piyyuṭim end with an invocation in six stanzas, each of which closes either with "for his sake do not withhold water!" or with "through his merit favor the outflow of water!" the merits of the Patriarchs, of Moses, of Aaron, and of the twelve tribes crossing the Red Sea being successively referred to. Following this invocation, the prayer leader proceeds: "For thou, O Lord our God, causest the wind to blow ... For a blessing and not for a curse, For plenty and not for famine, For life and not for death!" and the congregation thrice answers, "Amen!"

"Geshem" corresponds to the "Tal" (Dew) prayer recited on the first day of Passover, after which the above-quoted mention of rain is omitted as being inapplicable to the summer dry season, and is replaced by mention of dew.

In some communities, it is customary for the reader of the Musaf on the days on which "Geshem" or "Tal" is inserted, to put on the kittel, as on Yom Kippur, and before Mussaf to sing Kaddish in the tune of that solemn day; in some Western Ashkenazic communities, the words "le'eila le'eila" are repeated like on the High Holidays.

== History ==
From an early date, it has been customary to begin recital of the phrase "He causeth the wind to blow and the rain to descend" in the Musaf of Shemini Atzeret in the fall of the year, and it is recited for the last time on the first day of Passover, in the spring. The Talmudists had decided that the actual prayer for rain, "Give dew and rain for a blessing upon the face of the earth," in the ninth benediction of the Shemoneh Esreh, should be introduced only at the actual inception of the rainy season.

When Abudirham wrote his book on the liturgy, the Sephardim were still faithful to the Talmudic rule that "a man must not ask for his worldly necessities" in the first three benedictions; hence Abudirham distinguishes the additional service for Shemini Atzeret only by having the reader proclaim "He causeth the wind," etc., before the silent prayer. Nevertheless, the announcements in "Geshem" and "Tal" spread on the basis that they are affirmations of God's control of the seasons, rather than requests of God. Indeed, this view led to the rabbinical instruction that no private individual should utter the formula either within or without the synagogue until it had been proclaimed by the officiant, or, according to a later view, by the beadle, before the commencement of the Amidah. For a similar reason, the custom arose of displaying in the synagogue on Shemini Atzeret a board inscribed with the formula, and of publicly and formally removing it before the Musaf commenced on the first day of Passover.

In addition to the well-known sixfold invocation, Ashkenazic festival prayer-books also contain a number of other compositions. Foremost among these is one which sketches the agricultural work in each of the 12 months, and parallels therewith the influence of each of the 12 signs of the zodiac, setting Aries against Nisan, and so on through the year. Old machzorim often have the text illustrated with twelve rude woodcuts.

In Sephardic communities the piyyutim of Solomon ibn Gabirol are recited. However, the vast majority of contemporary Sephardic communities recite the piyyutim before Musaf, with only the Spanish and Portuguese Jews maintaining the recitation inside the repetition of the Amida.

== Ashkenazic melody ==
Ashkenazic melody for the Jewish prayer of Geshem, from the 1906 Jewish Encyclopedia

So much being held to depend on the proper proclamation of the "Geshem" and "Tal," a special melody was naturally adopted for each, for the sections of the Amidah, and for the piyyuṭim therein introduced and associated with them. Hence, in each European ritual melodies arose of much quaint charm, which are already of some antiquity and are well worthy of perpetuation.

The melody thus used by the Ashkenazim is the most Oriental in style, but this is due only to the utilization, for the "Geshem" service originally, of two characteristic phrases reminiscent of services performed on the two important occasions of the Jewish year immediately preceding the Shemini Atzeret, when it is sung. These phrases are taken, the one from the introduction to the "Ne'ilah" at the close of Yom Kippur, the other from the chant sung during the lulav-waving during the Hallel of Sukkot, and they are developed with new phrases into the combination here transcribed.

As, according to the system in which so many of the traditional intonations are utilized (see Hebrew cantillation, Synagogue Music, Nusach (Jewish music)), it is the particular occasion and service rather than the particular text which determines the tonality and outline of the officiant's chant, there is no need to present independently the Kaddish, the opening benedictions of the Musaf, or the following medieval verses, with all of which the motive is employed; but it will suffice to summarize the underlying thought for which the chant is generally appropriated. The preceding melody is used by the Ashkenazim as the traditional intonation for both "Geshem" and "Tal".

== Sephardic Melody ==
Sephardic melody for the Jewish prayer of Geshem, from the 1906 Jewish Encyclopedia

With the Sephardim the most representative melody of the "Geshem" and "Tal" is that reserved for the beautiful poem by Solomon ibn Gabirol commencing "Leshoni bonanta," which occurs in both services. This melody is of Spanish origin, and bears evidence of having been originally set to words of a different rhythm. It is probably one of those numerous folk-songs which, according to the repeated testimony of contemporaries, were constantly being adapted for synagogal use from the 10th to the 15th century. The close in the major at the end is of course the inspiration of some ḥazzan after the adaptation of the tune.

== Levant Melody ==
Levantine melody for the Jewish prayer of Geshem, from the 1906 Jewish Encyclopedia

The version preserved in the Levant appears to be a mutilated fragment of the Sephardic melody. But in place of the other hymns of Gabirol in these services the Turkish Jews preserve a chant of far more Eastern character, the tonality and construction of which brand it as a more recent offshoot of the Perso-Arab musical system. The Levantine tradition attributes to Israel Najara (d. 1581) the selection of the non-Jewish melodies which are utilized in their rendering of the service. Among the 650 which he adapted to Hebrew words this melody may well have found a place, especially as the modes of the Perso-Arab musical system were most favored by him in his selection of tunes.
