= David Hakohen =

Late 13th century Hebrew liturgical poet

David Hakohen (also haKohen or Ha-Kohen) was a late thirteenth-century Hebrew liturgical poet from Avignon, who wrote from a Jewish perspective in the troubadouresque tradition. His most published work, "Silence and Praise" (Hishtaḥavi u-birkhi), is in the form of a muwashshah, a prelude to prayer. Ironically, the ode pledges that the prayer will be silent. It has been translated into English. It opens like this:

Bow down, my soul, and kneel before my rock of refuge;
Praise the Lord and bless Him!
My lips are too low to sing his high praises.
My years are too few to recite his glorious works.
All my days would not suffice to tell his mighty deeds.
