= Kedushah (prayer) =

Jewish prayer

Kedushah (Jewish Babylonian Aramaic: קידושה, romanized: qiddúšā, lit. 'sanctification > holiness') is the name of several prayers recited during Jewish prayer. They have in common the recitation of two Biblical verses, Isaiah 6:3 and Ezekiel 3:12. These verses come from prophetic visions in which angels sing praises to God.

There exist several variations of the kedushah, which appear in different contexts and have different laws. The best-known Kedushah is recited in the Amidah. Another is recited in the Yotzer ohr blessing and a third, the qiddusha de sedra (Jewish Babylonian Aramaic: קידושה דסדראַ, romanized: qiddúšā ḏ séḏrā, lit. 'sanctification of the order') is recited on various occasions including the conclusion of weekday Shacharit. In some versions of the kedushah, additional Biblical verses are added in the same format as the verses from Isaiah and Ezekiel.

== Kedushah in the Amidah ==
The Kedushah is traditionally the third section of all Amidah recitations. In the silent Amidah, it is a short prayer; in the repetition, which requires a minyan, it is considerably lengthier. The recitation of Kedushah daily is a Babylonian custom; in the Palestinian tradition, the repetition of the Amidah would usually not include the Kedushah, with it added only on special occasions according to Soferim § 20. The liturgy varies among different communities and during different services, but they all hold in common three Bible verses (though translations vary):

Holy, Holy, Holy, The Lord of Hosts, The entire world is filled with His Glory. (Isaiah 6:3)

Blessed is the Glory of the Lord in Its Place (Ezekiel 3:12)

The Lord shall reign forever, Your God, O Zion, from generation to generation, Hallelujah (Psalms 146:10)

All three of the verses cited above are recited as part of the congregational response to the hazzan. For the first verse, Isaiah 6:3, it is traditional for everyone to rise to their toes with each recitation of the word qaddosh (Hebrew: קָדוֹשׁ, lit. 'holy').

In the Mussaf services of Shabbat, Jewish festivals, and in some communities, the Shacharit service as well, an enhanced version of the Kedushah is recited, with additional praises in between the biblical verses. In the Mussaf service of Shabbat and festivals, a fourth verse is added: the opening line of the Shema. The opening line of the Shema is included in the Kedushah on Ne'ilah of Yom Kippur, and in the Ashkenazic rite (including the Chasidic rite) in all of the Kedushahs of Yom Kippur. Many sources describe the recitation of the Shema during Mussaf as a response to historical anti-Jewish decrees prohibiting reciting the Shema at the proper point of Jews’ religious service, but contemporary scholars have proposed a variety of other explanations, as well.

During the Kedushah of the Amidah, petitioners are expected to stand, if able.

Kedushah is recited whenever the Amidah is repeated—that is to say, during Shacharit, Mincha, Mussaf, and Ne'ilah, but not Maariv.

== Kedushah in Yotzer Ohr ==
A second Kedushah is recited as part of the Yotzer ohr blessing, before the Shema. The only two verses recited here are Isaiah 6:3 and Ezekiel 3:12.

Early sources dispute whether this kedushah may be recited by individuals praying without a minyan. The Shulchan Aruch records this dispute, and permits individuals to recite it even alone, but recommends that they recite it in the Torah reading chant, so that it is akin to Torah study rather than a kedushah recitation. Moses Isserlis, recording the Ashkenazic practice, permits individuals to recite the kedushah without the Shulchan Aruch's recommendation in Orach Chaim 59:3.

== Qiddusha de sedra ==
The qiddusha de sedra is recited after weekday morning services, at the beginning of the afternoon services of Shabbat and festivals, the conclusion of the evening service of Saturday night, and in the Nusach Ashkenaz (including Nusach Sefard) at the beginning of the Ne'ilah service at the end of Yom Kippur.

This Kedushah contains three Hebrew Bible verses. The first two are the usual Isaiah 6:3 and Ezekiel 3:12. The third verse is Exodus 15:18, which is similar but not identical to Psalm 146:10, recited in the Amidah Kedushah. After each Biblical verse is recited in Hebrew, its Aramaic translation is recited. The qiddusha de sedra does not require a minyan.

== Sources and history ==
Kedushah is mentioned in several sources from the Talmudic period. The earliest source is the Tosefta, which says:

Judah bar Ilai would answer with the blesser: "Holy, holy, holy is the Lord of Hosts; the entire world is full of His honor" and "Blessed is the honor of the Lord from His place".

The Talmud states that the Great Assembly established "blessings, prayers, kedushot, and havdalot", but Rashi argues that the word "kedushot" here refers to kiddush rather than to Kedushah. Hekhalot Rabbati describes the angels praising God using the verses Isaiah 6:3, Ezekiel 3:12, Psalms 146:10; and the Jewish people reciting the verses "in Shacharit and Mincha". Similarly, the Talmud describes the angels reciting Isaiah 6:3 and Ezekiel 3:12, and Jews reciting at least the first of those verses:

Three groups of ministering angels say song each day; one says "Holy", one says "Holy", one says "Holy is the Lord of hosts". ... The ministering angels do not say song above until Israel says it below ... But there is [also the verse] "Blessed"! – It is [a different group of angels, the] ofanim, who say [that verse] ...

The accepted custom was to recite Kedushah in every Shacharit and Mincha Amidah repetition. However, Jews of the Land of Israel in this period only recited the Kedushah of the Amidah on special days – either Shabbat, or on any day Mussaf is recited as well as Hanukkah. Similarly, they recited the Kedushah of Yotzer Ohr only on such special occasions, and some communities may not have recited it at all.

== In other religions ==
The first Biblical verse in the Kedushah, Isaiah 6:3, is also found in the Sanctus of some Christian liturgical ordinaries.
