= Shemini Atzeret =

Jewish holiday

- Official name: שְׁמִינִי עֲצֶֽרֶת Translation: "The eighth [day] of Assembly"
- Observed by: Jews and Samaritans
- Type: Jewish, Samaritan
- Celebrations: Prayer for rain; includes, in Israel, the celebration of Simchat Torah
- Date: 22nd day of Tishrei
- 2025 date: Sunset, 13 October – nightfall, 14 October
- 2026 date: Sunset, 2 October – nightfall, 3 October
- 2027 date: Sunset, 22 October – nightfall, 23 October
- 2028 date: Sunset, 11 October – nightfall, 12 October
- Related to: Culmination of Sukkot (Tabernacles), the Geshem prayer

Shemini Atzeret (שְׁמִינִי עֲצֶרֶת—"Eighth [day] of Assembly") is a Jewish holiday. It is celebrated on the 22nd day of the Hebrew month of Tishrei, which usually coincides with late September or early October. It directly follows the festival of Sukkot, which is celebrated for seven days; thus, Shemini Atzeret is literally the eighth day [of assembly]. It is a separate—yet connected—holy day devoted to the spiritual aspects of the festival of Sukkot. Part of its duality as a holy day is that it is simultaneously considered connected to Sukkot and a separate festival in its own right.

Outside of Israel, this is further complicated by the additional day added to all biblical holidays except Rosh Hashanah and Yom Kippur. Shemini Atzeret is thus sometimes wrongly regarded as the eighth day of Sukkot outside the Land of Israel, leading to sometimes involved analysis as to which practices of each holiday are to apply.

The celebration of Simchat Torah is the most distinctive feature of the holiday, but it is a later rabbinical innovation. In the State of Israel, the celebrations of Shemini Atzeret and Simchat Torah are combined on a single day, and the names are used interchangeably. In the Diaspora, the celebration of Simchat Torah is deferred to the second day of the holiday. Commonly, only the first day is referred to as Shemini Atzeret, while the second is called Simchat Torah.

Karaite Jews and Samaritans also observe Shemini Atzeret, as they do all biblical holidays. However, due to differences in calendar calculations, it may occur on a different day from the conventional Jewish celebration. Karaites and Samaritans do not include the rabbinical innovation of Simchat Torah in their observance of the day and do not observe a second day—of any holiday—in the Diaspora.

== Biblical origins ==
According to The Jewish Encyclopedia, atzeret (Biblical Hebrew: עצרת, romanized: ʿaṣereṯ, lit. 'assembly') is the name given to this day in four different locations in the Hebrew Bible. It is not mentioned in Deuteronomy 16, and is found only in those parts of the Bible known as the Priestly Code. Like atzarah, atzeret denotes "day of assembly", from atzar ("to hold back" or "keep in"); hence the name atzeret given to the seventh day of Pesaḥ. Owing, however, to the fact that both Shemini Atzeret and the seventh day of Pesaḥ are described as atzeret, the name was taken to mean "the closing festival".

== Significance ==
=== Shemini: "Eighth Day" of Sukkot ===
When Shemini Atzeret is mentioned in the Torah (known in Greek as the Pentateuch), it is always mentioned in the context of the seven-day festival of Sukkot: the holiday Shemini Atzeret immediately follows. For example, Sukkot is described in detail in Leviticus 23:33–43. Shemini Atzeret is mentioned in only verses 36 and 39.

The Hebrew word shemini means eighth. This refers to the date of Shemini Atzeret relative to Sukkot; it falls on the latter's eighth day. (Note: In the terminology of the modern Hebrew calendar, Sukkot occurs on 15–21 Tishrei and Shemini Atzeret on 22 Tishrei.) It is often assumed that Shemini Atzeret is simply the eighth day of Sukkot. That characterization, however, is only partly accurate.

The celebration of Sukkot is characterized by the use of the sukkah (booth or tabernacle) and the Four Species (tree branches and fruit used in the celebration). (Note: These are known as the lulav (branches of the palm, myrtle and willow trees) and etrog (fruit of the citron).) However, the Torah specifies using those objects for only seven days, not eight. The observance of Shemini Atzeret, therefore, differs in substantial ways from that of Sukkot. The Talmud describes Shemini Atzeret with the words "a holiday in its own right" (regel bifnei atzmo).

The Talmud describes six ways in which Shemini Atzeret differs from Sukkot. Four of these relate principally to the Temple service, but two others remain relevant to the modern celebration of the holiday. First, the blessing known as Shehecheyanu is recited on the night of Shemini Atzeret just as it is on the first night of all other major Jewish holidays. Second, the holiday is referred to distinctively as "Shemini Atzeret" and not as "Sukkot" in the prayer service.

Immediately following that discussion, however, the Talmud describes Shemini Atzeret as the "end holiday of the festival [of Sukkot]". The context here is that the Sukkot obligations of joy and recitation of Hallel (Psalms 113–118) last eight days. This is also why one of Sukkot's liturgical aliases, "Time of Our Happiness" (zman simḥatenu), continues to be used to describe Shemini Atzeret—and, by extension, Simchat Torah—in the liturgy.

Shemini Atzeret is, in conclusion, simultaneously "a holiday in its own right" and the "end holiday of [Sukkot]".

=== Atzeret: A day for assembly—or pause ===
Spiritually, Shemini Atzeret can also be seen to "guard the seven days of Sukkot". The Hebrew word atzeret is generally translated as "assembly", but shares a linguistic root with the word atzor, meaning "stop" or "tarry". Shemini Atzeret is characterized as a day when the Jewish People "tarries" to spend an additional day with God at the end of Sukkot. Rashi cites the parable of a king who invites his sons to dine with him for a number of days, but when the time comes for them to leave, he asks them to stay for another day, since it is difficult for him to part from them. According to this idea, Sukkot is a universal holiday, but Shemini Atzeret is for only the Jewish People. Moreover, Shemini Atzeret is a modest holiday intended to honor [God's] special relationship with his beloved nation. (Note: Variants are quoted in Isaacs (2000, p. 88) and in The Jewish Encyclopedia)

A different but related interpretation is offered by Yaakov Tzvi Mecklenburg, who translates atzeret as "retain": "During the holiday season, we have experienced a heightened religious fervor and a most devout spirit. This last day is devoted to a recapitulation of the message of these days, with the hope that it will be retained the rest of the year".

=== Connections to the prior Jewish holy days ===
The day before Shemini Atzeret is the last day of Sukkot. It is called Hoshana Rabbah and is unique and different from the other days of Sukkot. While it is part of the "intermediate" days of Sukkot known as Chol HaMoed, Hoshana Rabbah has extra prayers and rituals and is treated and practised much more seriously and festively than are the previous days of Chol HaMoed. In particular, during the morning prayer service of Hoshana Rabbah, there are seven hoshanot with their own seven hakafot or "seven processions". That sets the stage for the ritual, mood, tenor, and heightened sense of festivity for the days that follow it—namely, of Shemini Atzeret when seven hakafot are again performed. The hakafot of Shemini Atzeret are the same as those used in the Simchat Torah celebration, which is observed in Israel in tandem with Shemini Atzeret. Outside the Land of Israel, the hakafot are performed by some congregations on the evening preceding Shemini Atzeret, and then by all on both the night and during the day of Simchat Torah.

The Jewish Encyclopedia states that during the time of the Second Temple, the festival of Shavuot received the specific name of "'Atzarta" as cited by Josephus in Antiquities of the Jews (iii. 10, § 6) and in the Talmud's tractate Pesahim (42b, 68b), signifying "the closing feast" of Passover. Commenting on this, the Rabbis in Tractate Pesahim say that:

The closing feast of Sukkot (i.e., Shemini Atzeret) ought rightly to have been, like that of Passover (i.e., Shavuot) on the fiftieth day, but, in order not to force the people to make another journey to Jerusalem in the rainy season, God fixed it as early as the eighth day.

Shemini Atzeret thus concludes the process of judgment, repentance, and atonement begun on Rosh Hashanah: the Jewish New Year. Four days after the conclusion of Yom Kippur, the Day of Atonement, Sukkot begins and is regarded as the celebration of the anticipated Divine "good judgment" that was, religious Jews hope, granted while observing the High Holy Days. (Rosh Hashanah, Yom Kippur, and the week between them are known as the Ten Days of Repentance.) Hoshana Rabbah, Shemini Atzeret, and Simchat Torah then culminate the process with open celebration and festivity with joyous prayers, festive meals, and dancing, with the Torah scrolls held as the center of attention during the hakafot in the synagogue.

== Evolution of observances and customs ==
The Torah explicitly mentions Shemini Atzeret three times, all in the context of Sukkot. Only two observances are specified for Shemini Atzeret. One relates to the Temple service, and is not relevant to modern observance. The other is the avoidance of "servile labor" (melechet avodah), as on other major Jewish holidays. (See also Jewish holidays — "Work" on Sabbath and biblical holidays.) No other specific rituals or ritual objects are specified, making Shemini Atzeret unique in that regard among the festivals mentioned in the Torah.

Two observances of Shemini Atzeret are mentioned in the Prophets and Writings portions of the Tanakh (Hebrew Bible). The first occurred at the time of the dedication of the First Temple by Solomon. The second came at the time of the Jews' return from the Babylonian exile. In both cases, however, the mention is limited to the observation that an "assembly [atzeret] was held on the eighth day".

According to the Apocryphal Second Book of Maccabees, the first celebration of Hanukkah mimicked that of Sukkot, which the Maccabees and their followers had been unable to celebrate earlier that year. However, the only allusion to Shemini Atzeret in that narrative is that the Hanukkah celebration was fixed for eight days—in remembrance of both the seven days of Sukkot and the additional day of Shemini Atzeret.

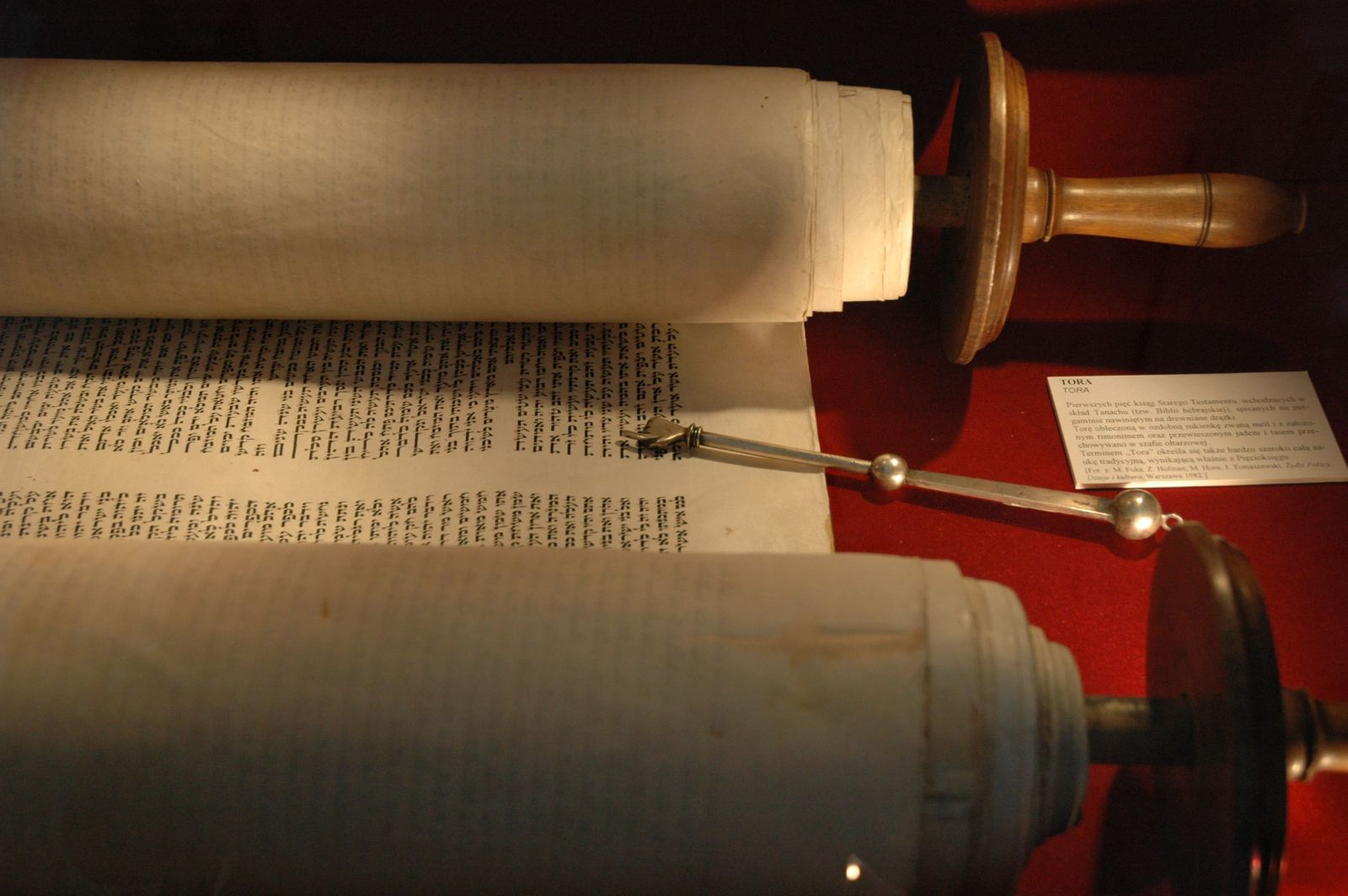
Torah and Yad

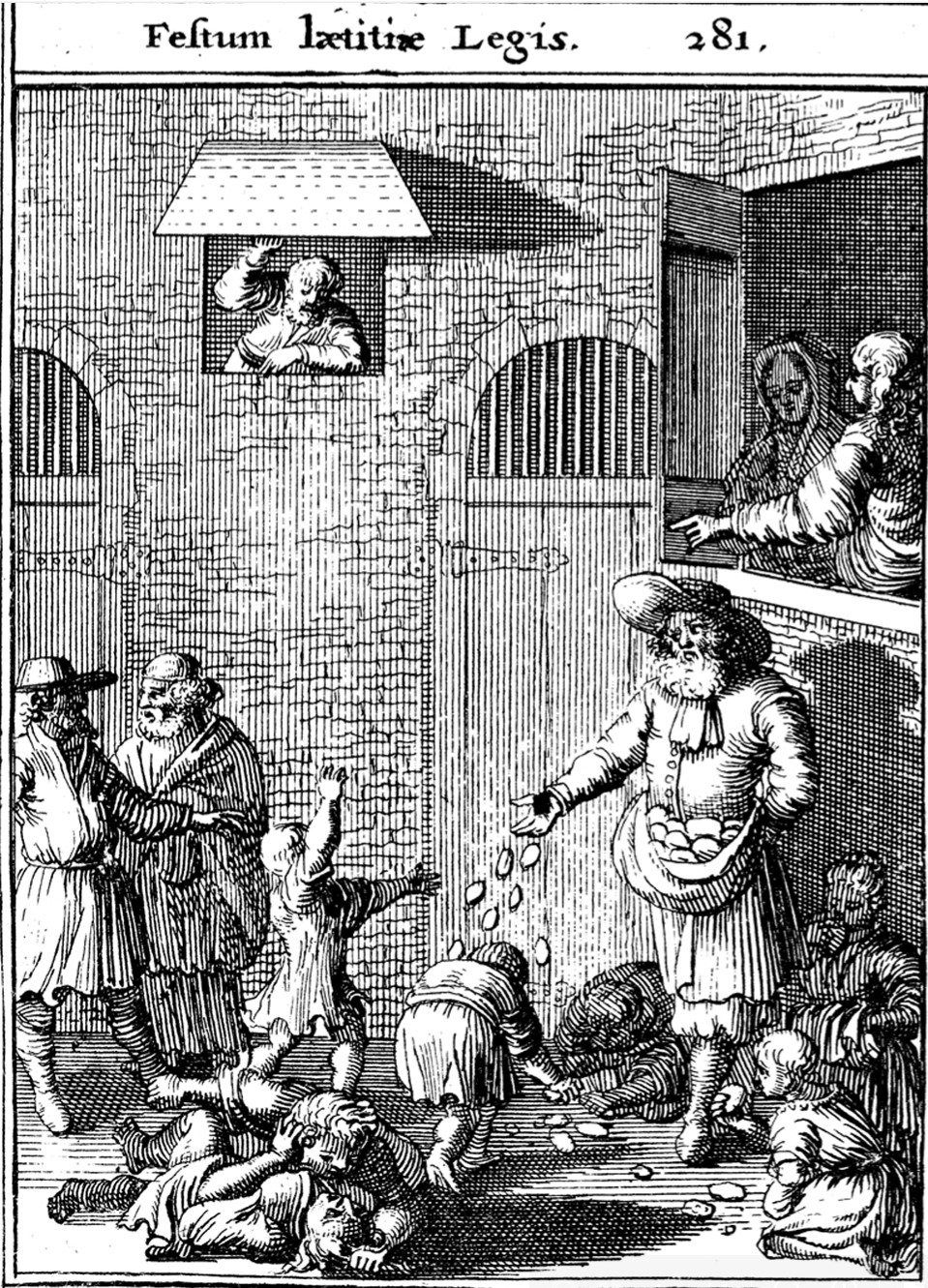
Throwing cakes to children on Simḥat Torah, by Johann Leusden in Philologus Hebræo-Mixtus, Utrecht, 1657

Like most Jewish holidays of Biblical origin, Shemini Atzeret is observed for one day within the Land of Israel, and traditionally for two days outside Israel. Reform and Reconstructionist communities generally celebrate this and most Biblical holidays for one day, even outside Israel. The second day observed outside Israel is called Simchat Torah (see next section).

=== Simchat Torah ===
The practice of reading the Ve-zot ha-berakhah, the last of the weekly Torah portions on Shemini Atzeret is documented in the Talmud. That Talmudic source does not refer to the occasion as "Simchat Torah", but simply as [the second day of] Shemini Atzeret, and it is also not clear from that source if it is read as the last Torah portion (as is our custom) or as a special Festival reading.

The Simchat Torah celebration of today is of later rabbinic and customary origin. The day (but not the name) is mentioned in the siddur of Rav Amram Gaon (9th century CE); the assignment of the first chapter of Joshua as the haftarah of the day is mentioned there. The reading of the first section of Genesis immediately upon the conclusion of the last section of Deuteronomy—as well as the name "Simchat Torah"—can be found in the 14th century halachic work Arba'ah Turim. By the 16th century CE, most of the features of the modern celebration of Simchat Torah were in place in some form. The Simchat Torah celebration is now the most distinctive feature of this festival—so much so that in the Land of Israel, where Shemini Atzeret lasts only one day, it is more common to refer to the day as "Simchat Torah" than as "Shemini Atzeret".

In the 20th century, Simchat Torah came to symbolize the public assertion of Jewish identity. The Jews of the Soviet Union, in particular, would celebrate the festival en masse in the streets of Moscow. On October 14, 1973, more than 100,000 Jews took part in a post-Simchat Torah rally in New York city on behalf of refuseniks and Soviet Jewry. Dancing in the street with the Torah has become part of the holiday's ritual in various Jewish congregations in the United States as well. In Israel, many communities conduct Hakafot shniyot, or "Second hakafot", on the day after Shemini Atzeret. In part, this shows solidarity with Jewish communities outside Israel, which are still celebrating Simchat Torah (on the second day of the festival). At the same time, it allows for a Simchat Torah celebration unconstrained by festival work restrictions, since the festival is over in Israel according to Jewish law.

Outside Israel, where Shemini Atzeret is observed for two days, Simchat Torah is deferred to the second day, when all agree there is no obligation of sukkah.

=== Carryover of Sukkot observances outside the Land of Israel ===
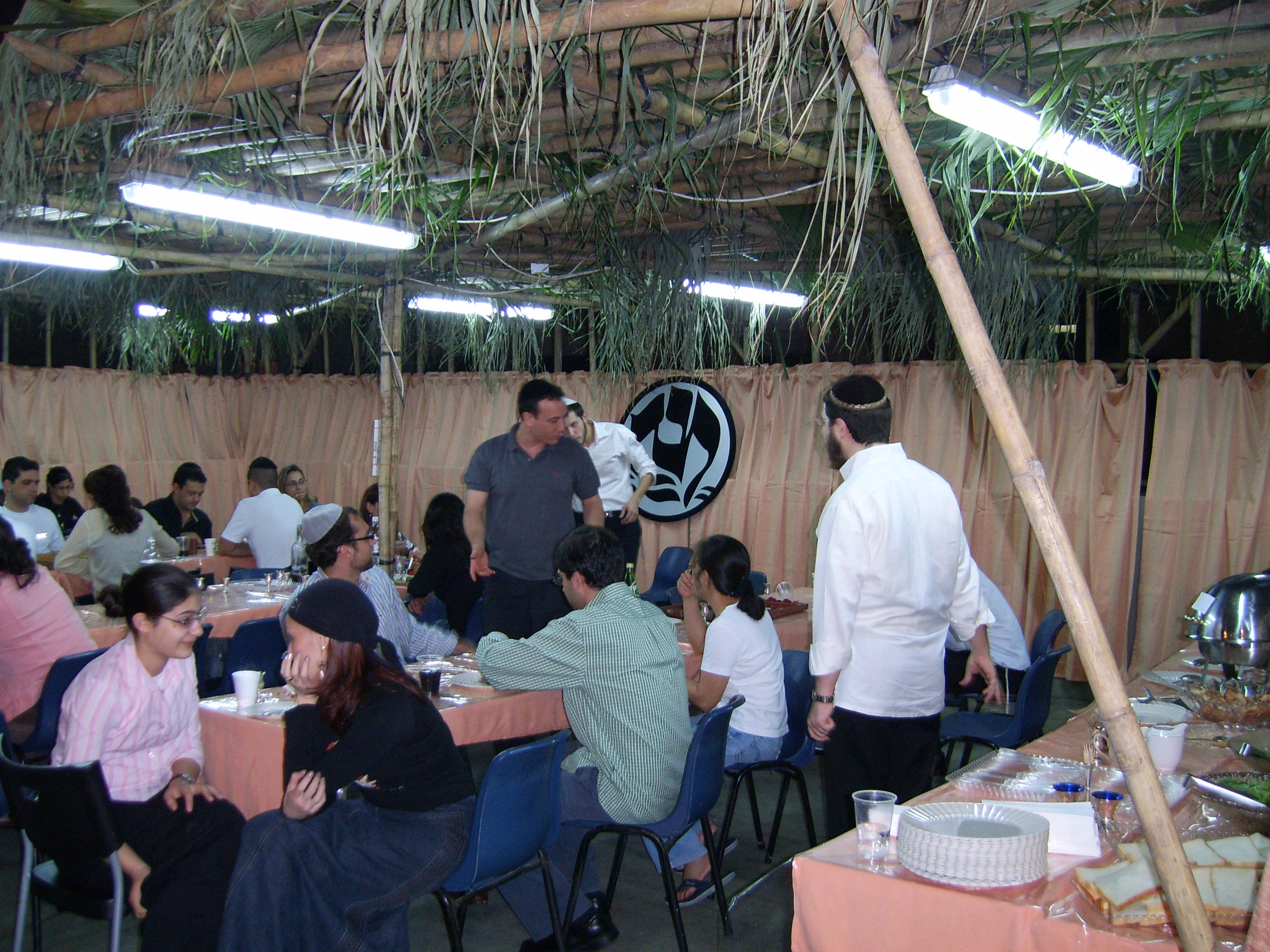
Sukkot celebration

In Israel—and for different reasons in Reform and Reconstructionist Judaism—none of the unique observances of Sukkot (sukkah, lulav and etrog) carry over to Shemini Atzeret. Shemini Atzeret is a holiday in its own right, without sukkah, lulav and etrog. At the same time, by the rabbinic decree to add one day to all holidays outside the Land of Israel, both Passover and Sukkot, although described in the Torah as seven-day holidays, are observed outside the Land of Israel for eight days. Accordingly, the "eighth day of Sukkot" outside Israel coincides with the separate holiday of Shemini Atzeret.

Psalm 27, which is recited in most communities twice daily starting at the beginning of Elul, continues to be recited on Shemini Atzeret outside the Land of Israel. When Shemini Atzeret falls on the Shabbat, the Scroll of Ecclesiastes, or Kohelet (קהלת, otherwise read in Ashkenazi synagogues on the Shabbat of Sukkot), is read on that day outside the Land of Israel. In the Land of Israel, it would have been read on the first day of Sukkot, which would also have been on Shabbat. The Torah reading (Deuteronomy 14:22–16:17) is the same as on the Final Day of Passover and Second Day of Shavuot. However, in the Eastern Ashkenazic rite, unlike Passover and Shavuot, the longer version of the Torah reading is included on Shemini Atzeret even when the day does not fall on the Shabbat because the reading refers to separation of agricultural gifts (like tithes and terumah), which are due at this time of the year; in the Western Ashkenazic rite, as well as in most Sephardic communities, the short reading is read on Shemini Atzeret when it falls on a weekday. The Haftarah describes the people's blessing of King Solomon at the end of the dedication of the First Temple.

==== Taking the lulav and etrog and sleeping in the sukkah ====
The prevalent practice is that one eats in the sukkah on the eighth day, but without reciting the blessing (berakhah) for sitting in a sukkah. However, one does not take the lulav and etrog (nor does one sleep in the sukkah according to most opinions) on the eighth day. If someone sees a neighbor on the street with a lulav and etrog on the eighth day, the rabbis reason, they might mistakenly assume that it is still the seventh day (ḥol hamoed), when the lulav and etrog are still needed. They might then violate prohibitions of the yom tov of the eighth day. For that reason, the rabbis ruled that one should not take the lulav and etrog on the eighth day, even outside the Land of Israel. They are therefore muktzah; that is, one may not even move them on a holiday where they are not needed. Sleeping in the sukkah brings a similar discussion. Additionally, most people would prefer to sleep indoors at this point in the year due to the weather, so sleeping in the sukkah may impinge on one's own joy during the festival. This is why many rabbis ruled that one does not sleep in the sukkah on Shemini Atzeret, even outside the Land of Israel. Other rabbis, such as the Vilna Gaon, ruled that one should sleep in the sukkah on Shemini Atzeret outside the Land of Israel.

==== Eating in the sukkah ====
Eating in the sukkah does not cause a parallel problem because many people simply enjoy eating outdoors in the shade of a sukkah. Hence, seeing someone eating in a sukkah does not per se lead one to assume it is still ḥol hamoed. Likewise, eating in the sukkah does not per se impinge on one's own celebration of Shemini Atzeret. Therefore, the prevalent practice is to eat in the sukkah on Shemini Azeret outside the Land of Israel, but not to recite the berakhah for sitting in a sukkah, as reciting it would "impinge" on the unique status of Shemini Atzeret.

There are, however, those who have different minhagim (customs). Many Hasidic groups have a tradition to recite the morning kiddush and then have refreshments (such as cake) in the sukkah, but to eat both the evening and morning main meals inside, notwithstanding the Talmudic ruling to the contrary. Others eat the evening meal of Shemini Atzeret indoors but the day meal in the sukkah. Each of these approaches addresses aspects of the dual nature of Shemini Atzeret.

=== Other customs ===
The Land of Israel's agriculture depends heavily on rains that come only seasonally, so Jewish prayers for rain, such as Tefillat Geshem or Tikun Geshem (Rain Prayer) are prominent during the Land of Israel's rainy (winter) half of the year. The rainy season starts just after the fall Jewish holidays. Because of that, and because the sukkah (and, by extension, pleasant weather) is no longer required on Shemini Atzeret, Jews begin to praise God for making rain starting with the Musaf amidah prayer of Shemini Atzeret. In the Ashkenazic tradition, this prayer is recited in a traditional, distinctive, plaintive melody during the cantor's repetition of the amidah; according to the original custom, there are also many silent piyyutim, which today are omitted in most communities but still maintained in some communities. In some Ashkenazi synagogues, the cantor is clad in a white kittel, a symbol of piety, owing to the vitality of a positive judgment for rain. A brief mention of rain continues to be inserted in the amidah until Passover. The Yizkor memorial service is also recited in the Eastern Ashkenazic rite on this day, and it was adopted in some Western Ashkenazic communities. Recital of the Yizkor prayer is said to bring the person "closer to the cold and brittle part of mourning", and is necessary to promote the healing of a broken heart.

== Observance in non-rabbinical Jewish traditions ==
As a biblically-mentioned holiday, Shemini Atzeret is also observed by Karaites and Samaritans:

=== In Karaite Judaism ===
For Karaites, followers of a branch of Judaism that accepts the Written Law, but not the Oral Law, Shemini Atzeret is observed as a single day of rest, not associated with the practices of Simchat Torah, which are a rabbinic innovation. Nevertheless, the Karaite cycle of weekly Torah reading, like the Rabbinic cycle, reaches its conclusion on Shemini Atzeret. Accordingly, in at least some Karaite circles, this day is referred to by the name of Simchat Torah. Additionally, calculation of the Karaite calendar is not based on astronomical calculations, but only on direct observation of the New Moon and the ripening of barley. Because of that, the 22nd day of the 7th month does not necessarily fall on the same date as 22 Tishrei in the (conventional, Rabbinic) Jewish calendar. In 2015, Shemini Atzeret fell on October 7 for Karaites, two days later than in the conventional Jewish calendar. In 2016, Shemini Atzeret fell on the same day according to both calendars.

=== In the Samaritan tradition ===
Samaritans, i.e. the northern Israelites who split from Jews during the reign of King Rehoboam, recognise only the first five (or six) books of the Bible as canonical, and thus celebrate only one day of Shemini Aṣereth.

Shortly after midnight, prayers are made in the synagogue for more than ten hours. No work is permitted on this day. At the end of the holiday, the succahs are dismantled. Their poles and nets will be stored until the next Harvest Festival. The fruits will be squeezed into sweetened juice and some will be eaten by the children.

== 2023 Hamas-led attack ==
On October 7, 2023, 06:29, on the morning of Shemini Atzeret, Hamas launched an attack on Israeli army installations and civilian communities near the Gaza border. Around 1,140 Israelis were killed and over 250 were kidnapped and taken to Gaza as hostages, most of them unarmed civilians. This event marked the starting point of the Gaza war.

== See also ==
- Christian observances of Jewish holidays (Shemini Atzeret)

== Bibliography ==
- Bank, Richard; Wiggins, Jane (2012). 101 Things Everyone Should Know about Judaism: Beliefs, Practices, Customs, and Traditions. Adams Media. ISBN 978-1440518645.
- Brener, Anne (2001). Mourning & Mitzvah: A Guided Journal for Walking the Mourner's Path Through Grief to Healing: With Over 60 Guided Exercises. Jewish Lights Publishing. p. 221. ISBN 978-1-58023-113-8.
- Cogan, Lainie Blum; Weiss, Judy (2002). Teaching Haftarah: Background, Insights, & Strategies. Behrman House, Inc. ISBN 978-0-86705-054-7.
- Eisenberg, Ronald L. (2010). Jewish Traditions: A JPS Guide. Jewish Publication Society. ISBN 978-0-8276-1039-2.
- Gurary, Guraryeh; Kaplan, Binyomin (2000). The Jewish Holy Days in Chasidic Philosophy. J. Aronson. ISBN 978-0-7657-6120-0.
- Hoffman, C. M. (2011). Judaism Made Simple: Flash. Hodder & Stoughton. ISBN 978-1-4441-4144-3.
- Isaacs, Ronald H. (2000). Every Person's Guide to Sukkot, Shemini Atzeret, and Simchat Torah. Every Person's Guide Series. Jason Aronson. ISBN 978-0-7657-6045-6.
- Kunin, Seth Daniel (2000). Themes and Issues in Judaism. Continuum. ISBN 978-0-304-33758-3.
- Nulman, Macy (1996). The Encyclopedia of Jewish Prayer: The Ashkenazic and Sephardic Rites. Jason Aronson, Incorporated. ISBN 978-1-4616-3124-8.
- Ribiat, Rabbi Dovid (1999). ספר ל״ט מלאכות [The 39 Melochos]. Jerusalem: Feldheim Publishers. ISBN 978-1-58330-368-9.
- Sacks, Lord Jonathan (2009). The Koren Siddur (Nusaḥ Ashkenaz, 1st Hebrew/English ed.). Jerusalem: Koren Publishers. ISBN 9789653010673.
- Wylen, Stephen M. (2000). Settings of Silver: An Introduction to Judaism. Paulist Press. ISBN 978-0-8091-3960-6.
