= Simchat Torah =

Jewish holiday marking the conclusion of public Torah readings

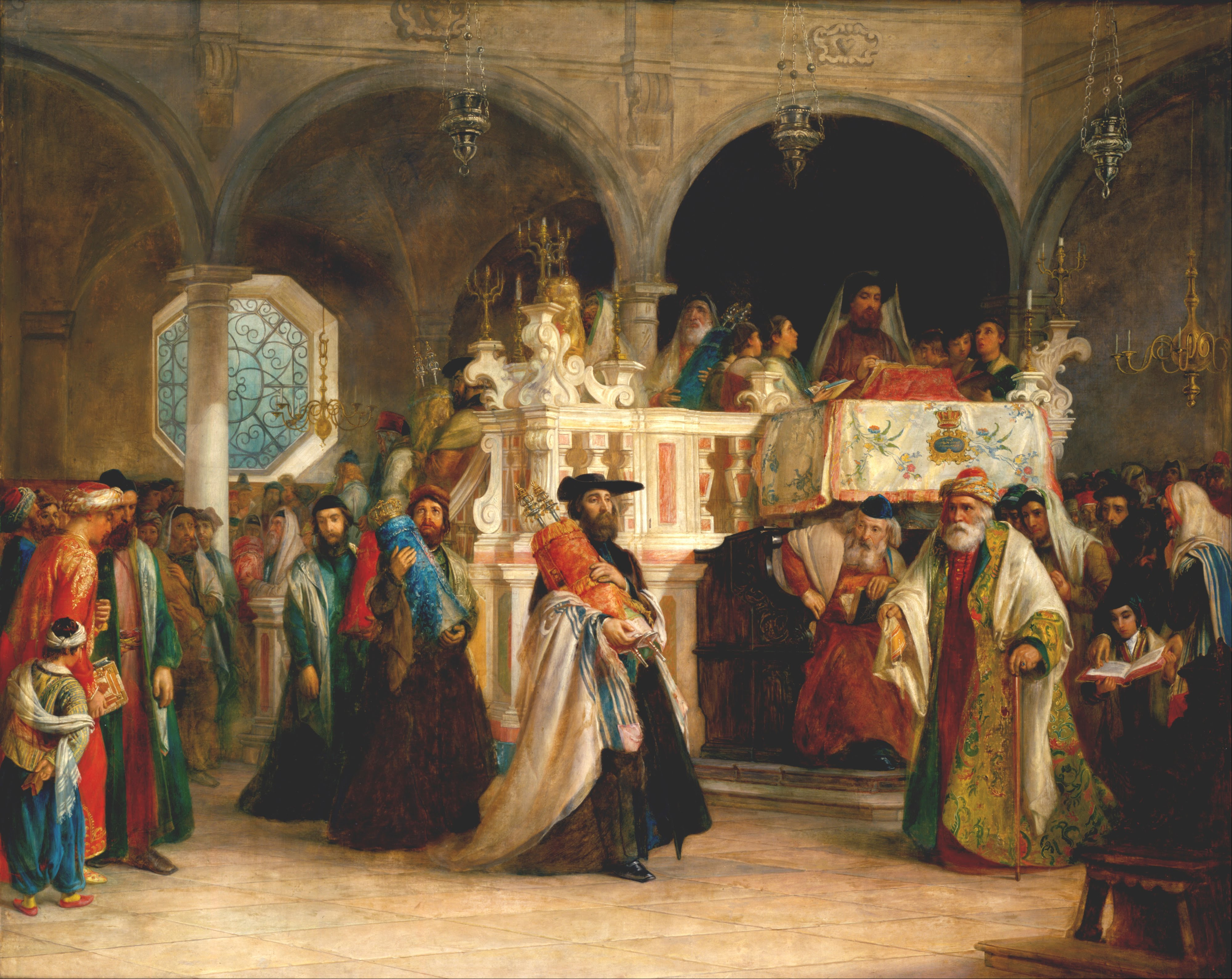
- The Feast of the Rejoicing of the Law at the Synagogue in Livorno by Solomon Hart, 1850. Jewish Museum, New York
- Official name: שמחת תורה
- Type: Jewish
- Significance: Culmination of Sukkot and Shemini Atzeret; conclusion and restart of the annual Torah reading cycle
- Celebrations: Dancing in synagogue as all the Torah scrolls are carried around in seven circuits (hakafot); melakha (work) is prohibited
- Date: 22nd of Tishrei (23rd outside of Israel)
- 2026 date: Sunset, 2 October – nightfall, 3 October (4 October outside of Israel)
- 2027 date: Sunset, 22 October – nightfall, 23 October (24 October outside of Israel)

Simchat Torah (Hebrew: שִׂמְחַת תּוֹרָה, lit. 'celebration of Torah'; Ashkenazi: Simchas Torah), also spelled Simhat Torah, is a major Jewish holiday that celebrates and marks the conclusion of the annual cycle of public Torah readings, and the beginning of a new cycle. It is the final celebration of the autumn festival season of the Hebrew month of Tishrei, spanning September and October, which begins with the High Holy Days. Simchat Torah is a component of the Biblical Jewish holiday of Shemini Atzeret ("Eighth Day of Assembly"), which follows immediately after the festival of Sukkot.

Simchat Torah's main celebration occurs in the synagogue during evening services. In many Orthodox as well as many Conservative congregations, this is the only time of year at which the Torah scrolls are taken out of the ark at night and are also read at night. In the morning, the last parashah of Deuteronomy and the first parashah of Genesis are read in the synagogue. On each occasion, when the ark is opened, the worshippers leave their seats to dance and sing with the Torah scrolls in a joyous celebration that lasts several hours.

The morning service is also uniquely characterized by each member of the congregation being called up for an aliyah. There is also a special aliyah for children.

== Duration of holiday ==
On the Hebrew calendar, the seven-day holiday of Sukkot in the autumn (late mid-September to late mid-October) is immediately followed by the holiday of Shemini Atzeret. In Orthodox and Conservative communities outside Israel, Shemini Atzeret is a two-day holiday, and the Simchat Torah festivities are observed on the second day. The first day is called "Shemini Atzeret", and the second day as "Simchat Torah". However, according to Halakha, both days are officially Shemini Atzeret, reflected in the liturgy. Many Hasidic communities have hakafot on the eve of the first day of Shemini Atzeret. However, in all communities outside Israel, no hakafot is done on the first morning.

In Israel, Shemini Atzeret and Simchat Torah are celebrated on the same day. Reform congregations, even outside Israel, may do likewise. Many communities in Israel have Hakafot Shniyot ("Second Hakafot") on the evening following the holiday, which is the same day as Simchat Torah evening in the diaspora. The custom was started by the former Chief Rabbi of Tel Aviv, Rabbi Yedidya Frankel.

== Evening festivities ==
The Simchat Torah festivities begin with the evening service. All the synagogue's Torah scrolls are removed from the ark and are carried around the sanctuary in a series of seven hakafot (circuits). Although each hakafa needs to encompass only one circuit around the synagogue, the dancing and singing with the Torah often continues much longer and may overflow onto the streets.

In Orthodox and Conservative Jewish synagogues, each circuit is announced by a few melodious invocations imploring God to Hoshiah Na ("Save us") and ending with the refrain, Aneinu v'Yom Kor'einu ("[God] answer us on the day we call"). In Orthodox and Conservative synagogues, the hakafot are accompanied by traditional chants, including biblical and liturgical verses and songs about the Torah, the goodness of God (Mipi El is an example), Messianic yearnings, and prayers for the restoration of the House of David and of the Temple in Jerusalem. Congregations may also sing other popular songs during the dancing. Children often receive flags, candies, and other treats. The vigor of the dancing and degree of festive merriment varies with congregational temperament.

In Orthodox synagogues, men and boys predominate in the dancing; children (even young girls) may also dance with their fathers. Women and older girls often have dancing circles (sometimes with the Torah scrolls) or look on from the other side of a mechitza (partition), in accordance with the value of tzniut (modesty). In Conservative and Progressive congregations, men and women dance together. In some congregations, the Torah scrolls are carried out into the streets, and the dancing may continue far into the evening.

After the hakafot, many congregations recite a portion of the last parashah of the Torah, V'Zot HaBerakhah ("This is the Blessing ...") in Deuteronomy. The part read is usually 33:1–34:12, but this may vary by individual synagogue custom, although Deuteronomy is never read to the end of the evening.

== Morning festivities ==
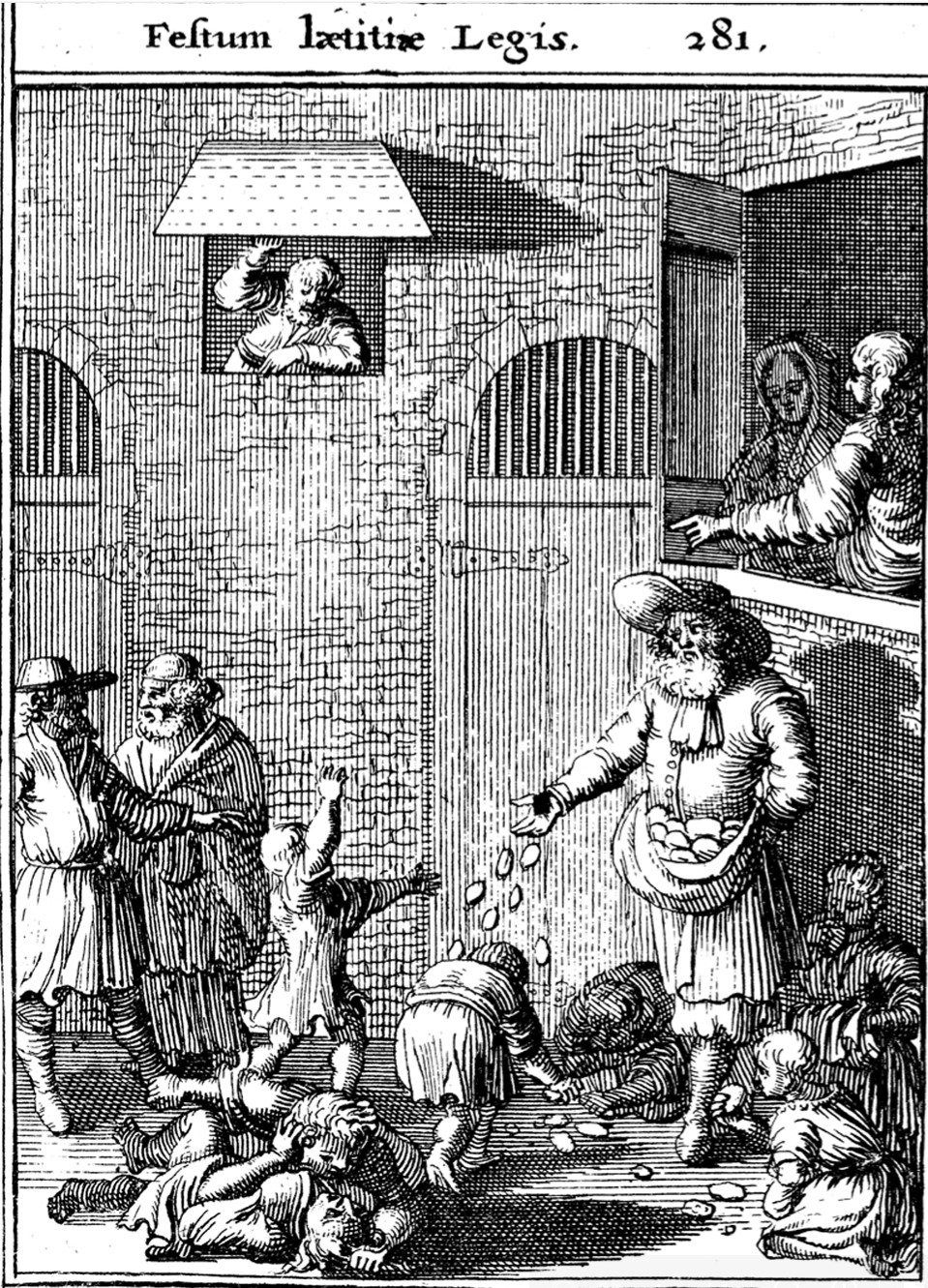
Throwing cakes to children on Simḥat Torah, by Johann Leusden in Philologus Hebræo-Mixtus, Utrecht, 1657

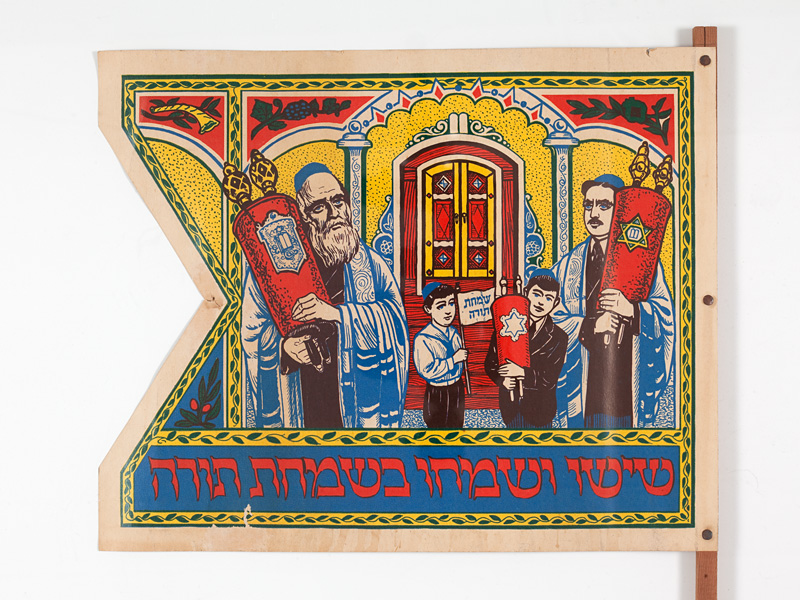
Paper flag for Simchat Torah, 1900, in the collection of the Jewish Museum of Switzerland

The morning service, like that of other Jewish holidays, includes a special holiday Amidah, the saying of Hallel, and a holiday Mussaf service. When the ark is opened to take out the Torah for the Torah reading, all the scrolls are removed from the ark, and the congregation starts the seven hakafot just like in the evening.

=== Early priestly blessing ===
In most Eastern Ashkenazic communities, one deviation from an otherwise ordinary holiday morning service is the performance of the Priestly Blessing as part of the Shacharit service before the celebrations connected with the Torah reading begin, rather than as part of the Musaf service that follows. This practice hearkens back to an old custom for the kiddush sponsored by the Hatan Torah (see below) to be held during the Simchat Torah service itself, where hard liquor (along with other refreshments) may be served. Since the Bible prohibits Kohanim (descendants of Aaron) from performing the priestly blessing while intoxicated, and there is concern that Kohanim may imbibe alcoholic beverages during the Simchat Torah festivities, the blessing was moved to before the time when alcohol would be served. In some congregations, the Kohanim deliver their blessing as usual during the Musaf service of Simchat Torah. In some Western Ashkenazic communities and many communities in Israel, the Kohanim deliver their blessing at Shacharit and Musaf services, as at every festival.

=== Torah reading and customs ===
After the hakafot and the dancing, three scrolls of the Torah are read. The last parashah of the Torah, V'Zot HaBerakhah, at the end of Deuteronomy (33:1–34:12), is read from the first scroll, followed immediately by the first chapter (and part of the second) of the Book of Genesis (1:1–2:3), which is read from the second scroll. It is a Jewish custom that a new beginning must immediately follow a completion; therefore, reading Gen. 1 immediately after finishing Deuteronomy is logical.

It is a special honor to receive the last aliyah of the Book of Deuteronomy; the person receiving that aliyah is called the Hatan Torah (Torah Groom). Initially, Hotem Torah (Torah Completer), the term shifted in the medieval period and now signifies a titled honoree. By extension of this shift, the person who is called to begin Genesis is known as the Hatan Bereishit (Genesis Groom) and, in synagogues that allow women to receive an aliyah, the honorees are known as Kallat Torah (Torah Bride) and Kallat Bereishit (Genesis Bride). According to historical custom, still practiced in many congregations, these "grooms" are wealthy patrons of the synagogue who recognize the honor with special largesse; Modern Orthodox congregations generally choose Torah scholars instead.

In many congregations, it is customary to call all eligible congregation members for an aliyah to the Torah on Simchat Torah. To accommodate this, the first five aliyot are reread so that everyone has an opportunity to recite the blessing. To save time, some congregations call people up in groups. Others hold a series of separate minyanim for the Torah reading. In a minority of Orthodox congregations, women receive aliyot in single-gender tefillah groups (prayer groups consisting only of women who pray together), and only men are called to the Torah in front of the whole congregation.

Another custom is to call all the children (in Orthodox congregations, boys only) to a special aliyah called Kol HaNe'arim ("all the children"). In many congregations, a large tallit is spread out over the heads of all the children as the blessing over the Torah is pronounced. The congregation blesses the children by reciting (in Hebrew) a verse from Jacob's blessing to Ephraim and Manasseh, Genesis 48:16.

May the angel who redeems me from all evil bless the children, and may my name be declared among them, and the names of my fathers Abraham and Isaac, and may they teem like fish for multitude within the land.

Although the blessing of the children is omitted from the 1985 edition of Conservative Judaism's Siddur Sim Shalom prayer book, it was reinstated in later versions. Most Conservative congregations still perform it.

After the portion of Genesis is read, the Maftir, Numbers 29:35–30:1, is read from a third Torah scroll. The passage describes the prescribed offerings performed for the holiday. The haftarah (reading from the prophets) is the first section of the Book of Joshua.

== History ==
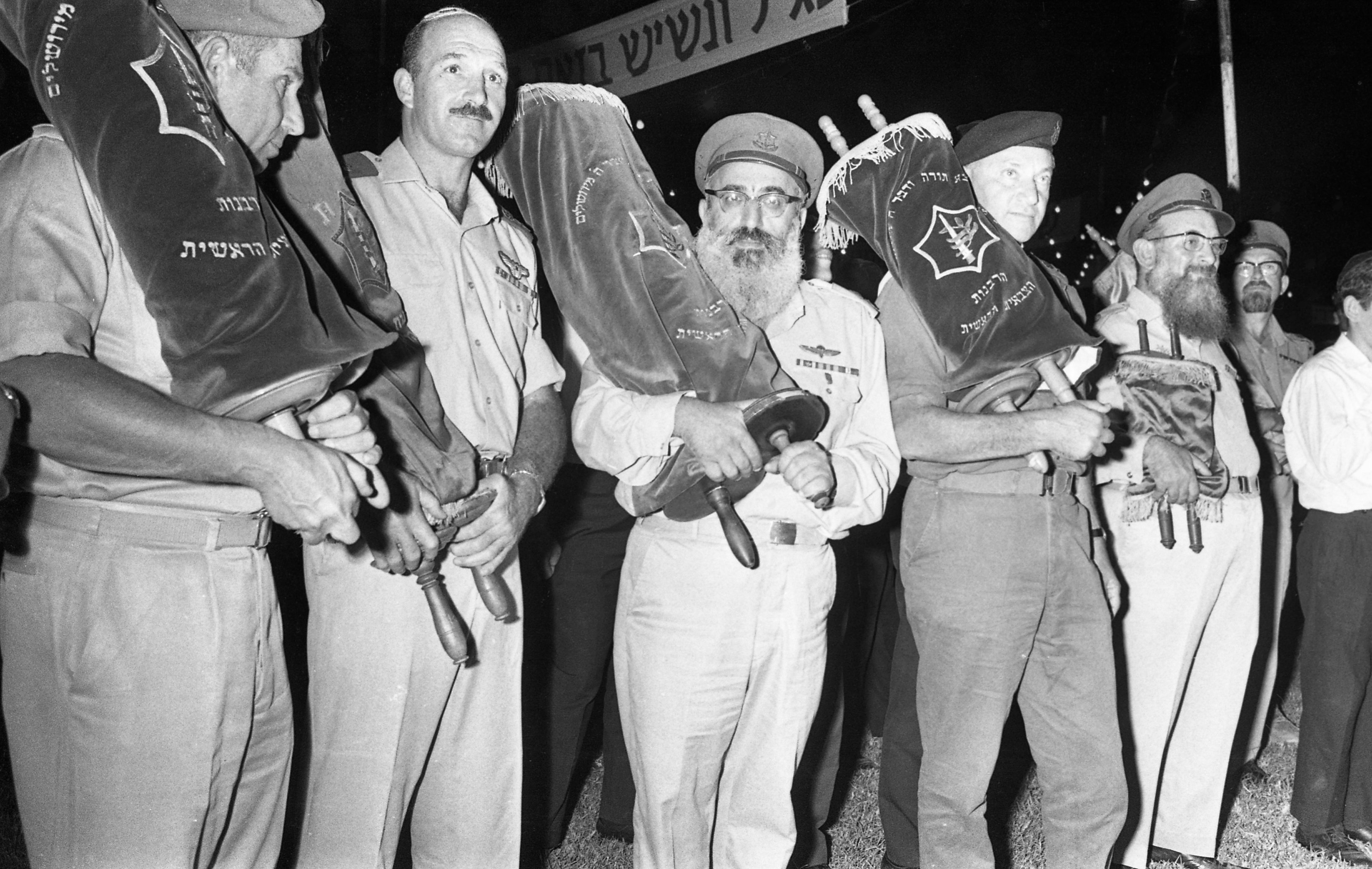
Simchat Torah celebrated in the Israeli army with Shlomo Goren, 1969

The name Simhat Torah was not used until relatively recently. In the Talmud (Meg. 31b), it is called Shemini Atzeret.

=== Celebration and dancing ===
Modern customs of celebration and dancing arose in the early Rishonic period. Isaac ibn Ghayyat (1030–1089) writes in his Me'ah She'arim that he asked Hayy ben Sherira "about those whose wont is to remove the sefer Torah from its ark at the close of the holiday, and [Hayy] responded that this is not our practice ... but that local customs should not change." Joseph Colon Trabotto adds in his Responsa that in his edition (ours is lacunose), ibn Ghayyat added that Hayy had also written, "Our habit is to dance [on the day after Sh'mini Atzeret] specifically, even many of the elders, when they make eulogies of the Torah, and this is permitted because it glorifies the Torah", a ruling affirmed by Moses Isserles (Darkhei Moshe). This places the custom of removing the scrolls from the ark and dancing in some locales into the 11th century. Abraham ben Isaac of Narbonne (1080–1158) writes in haEshkol that "this teaches that we make a feast to complete the Torah. Therefore we make great feasts and ample delicacies on the day of Simchat Torah, to honor the Torah's completion". Abraham ben Nathan (12th century) writes in haManhig that "the French rite is ... they make large celebrations, the entire community in the homes of the honorees, because it is the Simchat Torah." Zedekiah ben Abraham Anaw (13th century) writes in Shibbolei haLeqet that "It is called Simchat Torah ... the custom is for the Chatan Torah to make a feast and to distribute sweets and candies".

=== Readings ===
As early as the 9th century, perhaps earlier, some Jewish communities assigned a special reading from the Prophets to be read on this day. In the 13th century, the reading of Genesis was added in some communities immediately upon the completion of Deuteronomy, and the Shulhan Arukh (written about 1565) codifies this. There is presumably a later custom of southern European countries to remove all the Torah scrolls from the ark and to sing a separate hymn for each one. In northern European countries, those who had finished the reading of Deuteronomy donated to the synagogue, after which the wealthier members of the community would give a dinner for friends and acquaintances. By the end of the 15th century, it was a common though not universal practice for the children to tear down and burn the sukkahs on Simchat Torah.

In the 16th century, taking out the scrolls and filing solemnly around the bimah on the night of the 23rd of Tishri became customary. On the same evening, several passages from the Torah were read after the procession.

In the 17th century, Rebecca bat Meir Tiktiner of Prague composed a poem about Simchat Torah.

In Poland, it was the custom to sell to the members of the congregation, on the 23rd of Tishri, the privilege of executing various functions during the services on Shabbat and Jewish festivals; i.e., the synagogue used this occasion as a fund-raiser. People who made these donations were called to the Torah and given a congregational blessing.

== Symbolism ==
=== "Feet" of the Torah ===
In Chabad Hasidic thought, the traditional dancing with the Torah allows the Jew to act as the "feet" of the Torah, taking the Torah where it wishes to go, as feet transport the head. This is considered an act of submission to the will of God as expressed in the dictates of the Torah. It is an act that causes the Jew to inherently and naturally observe the Jewish faith. And just as the head benefits from the mobility of the feet, so does the Torah become exalted by the commitment of the Jew.

=== Symbol of Jewish identity ===
In the 20th century, Simhat Torah symbolized the public assertion of Jewish identity. The Jews of the Soviet Union, in particular, would celebrate the festival en masse in the streets of Moscow. On October 14, 1973, more than 100,000 Jews took part in a post–Simhat Torah rally in New York City on behalf of refuseniks and Soviet Jewry. Dancing in the street with the Torah has become part of the holiday's ritual in various Jewish congregations in the United States as well.

=== Rejoicing under adversity ===
Holocaust survivor Elie Wiesel said:

The Gaon of Vilna said that ve-samachta be-chagekha (You shall rejoice in your festival; Deuteronomy 16:14) is the most difficult commandment in the Torah. I could never understand this puzzling remark. Only during the war did I understand. Those Jews who, in the course of their journey to the end of hope, managed to dance on Simhat Torah, those Jews who studied Talmud by heart while carrying stones on their back, those Jews who went on whispering Zemirot shel Shabbat (Hymns of Sabbath) while performing hard labor ... ve-samachta be-chagekha was one commandment that was impossible to observe—yet they observed it.

After the October 7 attacks, which occurred on Simhat Torah, Israeli communities have sought to balance their traditional celebrations with their grieving and commemorations for those who were killed.

== Commemoration ==
In 1996, the Israel Postal Authority issued a postage stamp to honor the holiday.

== See also ==
- October 7 attacks

== Bibliography ==
- Goodman, Philip. Sukkot and Simchat Torah Anthology JPS, 1988. ISBN 0-8276-0010-0
- Yaari, A. Toldot Hag Simchat Torah. Jerusalem: Mosad Harav Kook, 1964.
- Zinberg, Israel. Old Yiddish Literature from Its Origins to the Haskalah Period KTAV, 1975. ISBN 0-87068-465-5. On Rebecca batMeir Tikitiner's Simchat Torah poem, see p. 51ff.
