= Anim Zemirot =

Jewish prayer poem

An'im Zemirot (Hebrew: אנעים זמירות, lit. "I shall sweeten songs") IPA: [anʕiːm zǝmiːˈroːt] is a Jewish liturgical poem recited in most Ashkenazic synagogues during Shabbat and holiday morning services; in most communities, it is said at the end of services, and in a small number of communities it is recited at the beginning of services or before the Torah reading. Formally, it is known as Shir Hakavod (שיר הכבוד, lit. "Song of Glory") IPA: [ˈʃiːr hakkɔːˈvoːd], but it is often referred to as Anim Zemirot, after the first two words of the poem.

Anim Zemirot is recited responsively, with the first verse read aloud by the Shaliach Tzibbur (שליח ציבור, lit. messenger of the congregation), the second verse recited by the congregation in unison, and so on. The poem is believed to have been written by Judah ben Samuel of Regensburg, the 12th-century German scholar and pietist.

== Structure ==
The main body of Anim Zemirot consists of 31 original verses, followed by two verses from Tanach: the first from Chronicles 29:11 and the second from Psalms 106:2. From the fifth to the twenty-eighth verse, the verses each begin with the successive letter in the Hebrew alphabet, except for the letter reish (ר) and tav (ת), both of which appear twice. As there are an odd number of verses within the main body, the congregation traditionally recites the last verse of the main body along with the shaliach tzibbur. In later editions, there are an additional three verses; usually, the first two are then recited alone by the members of the congregation and the shaliach tzibbur recites the verse from Psalms aloud to indicate the completion of Anim Zemirot and in many communities this is followed by a kaddish yatom (קדיש יתום, Mourners' kaddish).

The Holy Ark is opened for the recital of Anim Zemirot, befitting its formal title of "The Song of Glory." There is an account that this name originated because of an old tradition to recite the last four verses of Psalm 24 prior to reciting Anim Zemirot. According to the Levush, the recital of Anim Zemirot has been restricted so that it not become overly familiar and mundane. While most congregations recite it on Shabbat and Jewish holidays, the Vilna Gaon was of the opinion that it should be recited only on holidays. A small minority of congregations recite it only on Rosh Hashanah and Yom Kippur.

In many synagogues, it has become the custom for Anim Zemirot to be recited by a child.

== Bibliography ==
- Adler, Elchanan (2017). Sefer Tsevi tifʼarah : beʼurim ṿe-heʻarot le-fiyuṭ Anʻim zemirot (in Hebrew). Passaic, NJ. OCLC 1032335100.
