= Mussaf =

Jewish Shabbat and holiday prayer service

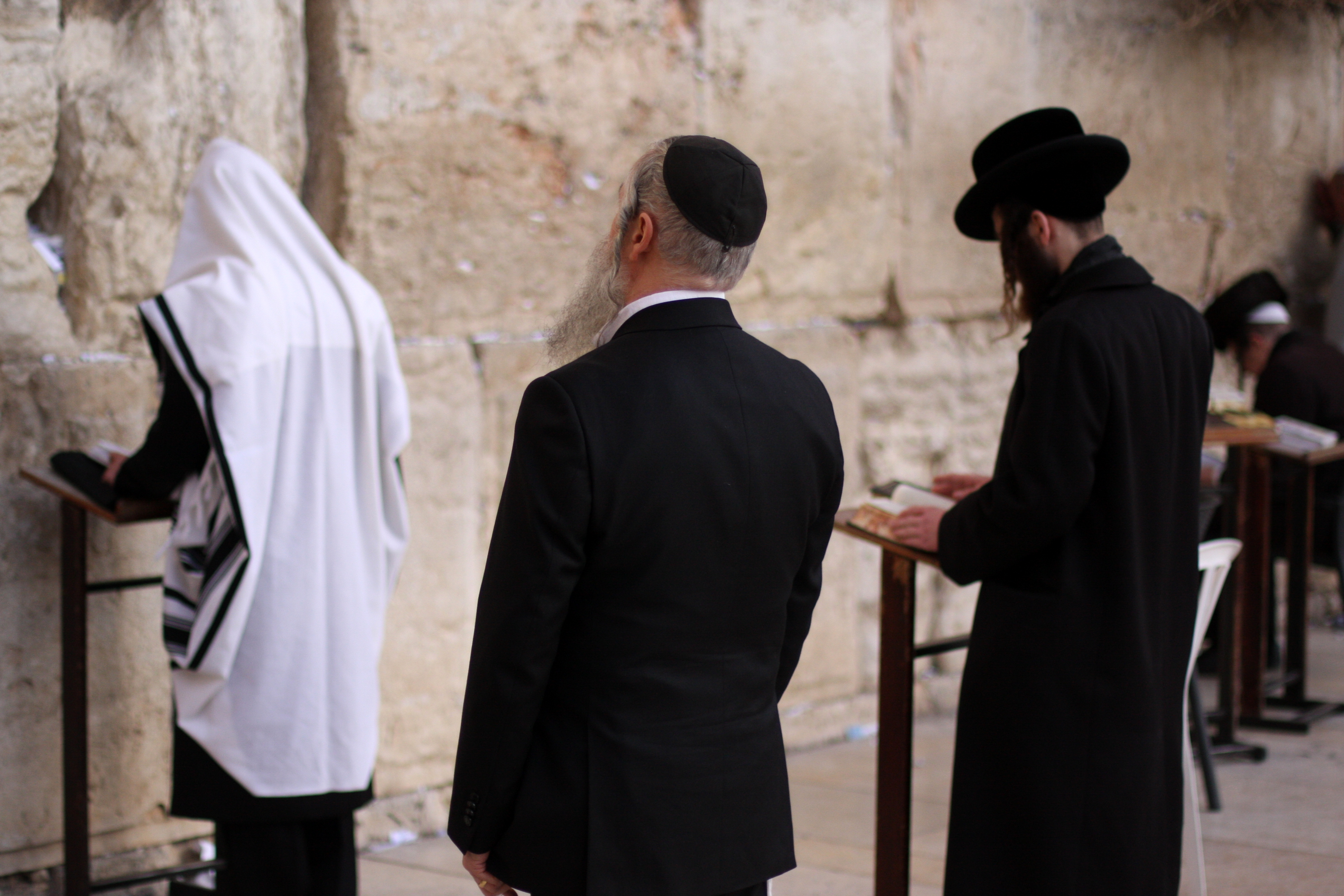
Western Wall, Jerusalem

Mussaf (Hebrew: מוּסָף, also spelled Musaf or Musof) is a Jewish prayer service that is recited on Shabbat, Jewish holidays, Chol Hamoed, and Rosh Chodesh in addition to the three other services religious Jews recite daily: Shacharit (morning), Mincha (afternoon), and Maariv (evening). It is traditionally combined with Shacharit when recited. In contemporary Hebrew, the word may also signify a newspaper supplement.

During the days of the Temple in Jerusalem, additional sacrificial offerings were given on Shabbat, festival, days Rosh Chodesh, and Chol Hamoed; in the absence of sacrifices, Mussaf were likely instituted between the destruction of the Second Temple in 70 CE and the end of the Mishnaic period.

Mussaf refers to both the complete service—which includes the Amidah and all other Jewish prayers recited following Shacharit —and the Amidah that is recited in Mussaf itself. The main addition is a fourth blessing of the Amidah, especially for the noted days. The time permitted for the recitation of Mussaf extends until the seventh halakhic hour of the day, which divides the day into twelve-hour segments. It is recommended to begin Mussaf before 6.5 halakhic hours, as doing so helps to avoid uncertainty regarding whether to recite Mussaf or Mincha first. If Mussaf is not recited by this time, it remains permissible to recite it for the remainder of the day; however, a person who intentionally delays this is referred to as a "sinner" by Rabbis in tractate Berakhot 28a of the Talmud.

The Priestly Blessing is said during a congregational hazzan's repetition of the Amidah. In the Eastern Ashkenazic rite outside the land of Israel, the Mussaf Amidah of major Jewish holidays is the only time the Priestly Blessing is said.

== Etymology ==
The name "Musaf" refers to addition, since it is an additional prayer service recited on festive days that is taking the place of additional offerings that were once made on these days. It is related to the name Joseph (Yosef).

== Beliefs of movements ==
=== Orthodox ===
Orthodox Judaism considers the recitation of the traditional Mussaf normative and includes it as part of the regular prayer service on the days it is recited.

=== Conservative ===
In Conservative Judaism, an adapted Mussaf is recited: The liturgy identifies the State of Israel as the Jewish homeland, but recognizes the Temple as a historical institution without explicitly calling for its future reconstruction. The Rabbinical Assembly of Conservative Judaism has devised two forms of the Mussaf Amidah with varying degrees of difference from the Orthodox form. One version refers to the prescribed sacrifices, but in the past tense ("there our ancestors offered" rather than "there we shall offer"). A newer version omits references to sacrifices entirely.

=== Reform ===
Reform and Reconstructionist Judaism generally omit the Mussaf Amidah on Shabbat, though it is retained on some festivals.

There are two reasons why: One is that it Mussaf involves the recitation of some prayers for what is the fourth time of the day; the other is Reform Judaism's rejection of sacrifice (as it appears in the Torah) as a necessary way to draw close to God.

== Mussaf by day ==
=== Rosh Chodesh ===
During Shabbat and Yom Tov, Tefillin are not worn at all. But on Rosh Chodesh, they are worn during Shacharit, and in most communities they are removed prior to Mussaf. This is because both tefillin and the Mussaf prayer are called ot (sign), and there is no need to have two signs at the same time. Alternatively, tefillin are likened to a crown, and when reciting the text of Mussaf Kedushah Keter yitnu lecha ("they will give You [God] a crown") it is improper to wear a crown on one's own head. In some German communities, it is optional to remove the Tefillin before mussaf, and some keep them on.

Near the end of the central Mussaf blessing, one requests 12 things from God ("goodness, blessing, rejoicing, happiness, redemption..."), corresponding to the 12 months of the year. During Hebrew calendar leap years, a 13th request is made ("atonement of willful sin"). In the Western Ashkenazic rite, the 13th request is recited only on Rosh Chodesh of Second Adar, the 13th month of the year.

=== Rosh Hashanah ===
On most days Mussaf is recited, the Amidah contains seven blessings - the three at the beginning and three at the end of every Amidah, and one in the middle in regards to the particular day. But on Rosh Hashanah, the Amidah contains nine blessings. The three middle blessings are in reference to Kingship, Remembrance, and the Shofar blowings.

The shofar is blown during Musaf as well as before musaf.

=== Simchat Torah ===
In the Eastern Ashkenazic rite in the Diaspora, Birkat Kohanim is recited on most Jewish holidays during the chazzan's repetition only during Mussaf. But on Simchat Torah, it is recited during Shacharit. This is because there is a tradition to drink prior to Mussaf, and Birkat Kohanim cannot be performed by drunk Kohanim. In the Western Ashkenazic rite, Birkat Kohanim is recited at Shacharit and Musaf, just like every other Festival. In most communities in Israel, it is recited at this Musaf just as it is every day; however, some communities in Israel omit it specifically on this occasion because of the concern of drunkenness.

== Prayers included on the Sabbath ==
The Mussaf service starts with the silent recitation of the Amidah. After the first three blessings included in every Amidah, the service continues Tikanta Shabbat reading on the holiness of Shabbat (in some communities, le-Moshe tsivita is recited instead of Tikanta Shabbat), and then by a reading from the biblical Book of Numbers about the sacrifices that used to be performed in the Temple in Jerusalem. Next comes Yismechu, "They shall rejoice in Your sovereignty"; Eloheynu, "Our God and God of our Ancestors, may you be pleased with our rest". The service then continues Retzei, "Be favorable, our God, toward your people Israel and their prayer, and restore services to your Temple" and concludes like any other Amidah.

This is followed by the Chazzan's repetition of the Amidah that includes an additional reading known as the Kedushah, as well as Birkat Kohanim (either the full one or the Chazzan's recitation of Birkat Kohanim).

After the Amidah comes the full Kaddish, followed by Ein ke'eloheinu. In Orthodox Judaism this is followed by a reading from the Talmud on the incense offering called Pittum Haketoreth and daily psalms that used to be recited in the Temple in Jerusalem. These readings are usually omitted by Conservative Jews, and are always omitted by Reform Jews.

Pittum ha-ketoret is followed by the Rabbi's Kaddish (in the Western Ashkenazic rite, a Mourner's Kaddish is recited instead), the Aleinu, followed in most communities by a Mourner's Kaddish. Some communities conclude with the reading of Anim Zemirot, Shir Hayichud, the psalm of the Day, and/or either Adon Olam or Yigdal.

== Women ==
There is a debate, in Orthodox Judaism, whether women are required to recite Mussaf, being that it is a time-bound commandment (from which women are generally exempt), and based on the opinion that they are only obligated to pray once a day. The Mussaf service contains only a commemorative mention of the sacrifices, and does not contain any personal requests, thereby making there be no special reason for women to recite it.

In any case, Ashkenazi women are permitted to recite Mussaf. On Rosh Hashanah, it is recommended that a woman who does not wish to remain in the synagogue for the Mussaf to still listen to the shofar blowing (even though strictly speaking, women are not obligated in shofar), but if she will not stay in shul, it is preferable for her to hear the shofar blowing before mussaf rather than the blowing in the middle of Mussaf.

Rabbi Ovadiah Yosef ruled that women should come to the synagogue and listen to Mussaf, but not recite it, as the prayer might be considered a "blessing in vain" as they are not required to recite it. However, other Sephardi authorities permitted women to recite Mussaf.

On High Holidays, women are required to recite Mussaf and Ne'ila.

== Offerings ==
The verses recited during the Mussaf Amidah (which are also read for the Maftir on the corresponding days) are all derived from the Book of Numbers chapters 28 and 29 (Parshat Pinchas). In the Nusach Ashkenaz and Nusach Sefard as well as in the Italian Nusach, the following additional offerings are recited as part of musaf on each day Mussaf is recited; in the Sephardic rite, they are recited only on the Sabbath and Rosh Chodesh, but omitted on Festivals. Due to the fact that Jewish holidays are observed two days in the Diaspora rather than the one day commanded in the Torah, the schedule for recitation is modified.

Day	Animal offerings	Biblical verses	Other notes
Shabbat	Two lambs	Numbers 28:9-10	When Shabbat coincides with Yom Tov or Chol Hamoed, the Yom Tov Mussaf Amidah is recited with Shabbat verses inserted.; When Shabbat coincides with Rosh Chodesh, a special Shabbat-Rosh Chodesh Amidah is recited, beginning with the verse "Ata Yatzarta" and containing verses for the offerings of both.
Rosh Chodesh	Elevation offering Two young bulls One ram Seven lambs	Numbers 28:9-11	
Passover; Day 1	Fire offering Elevation offering Two young bulls One ram Seven male lambs	Numbers 28:16-19	Recited days 1–2 in Diaspora (Nisan 15–16)
Passover; Days 2-7	Fire offering Elevation offering Two young bulls One ram Seven male lambs	Numbers 28:19	Recited on days 3–8 in Diaspora (Nisan 17–22)
Shavuot	Elevation offering Two young bulls One ram Seven male lambs	Numbers 28:26-27	Recited two days in Diaspora (Sivan 6–7)
Rosh Hashanah			
Yom Kippur	1 bull 1 ram 7 male lambs 1 male goat	Numbers 29:7-11	
Sukkot; Day 1	Elevation offering Fire offering 13 young bulls 2 rams 14 lambs	Numbers 29:12-13	Recited on first two days of Sukkot in Diaspora (Tishrei 15–16)
Sukkot; Day 2	12 young bulls 2 rams 14 lambs	Numbers 29:17	Recited on the first day of Chol Hamoed (third day of Sukkot) in the Diaspora
Sukkot; Day 3	11 young bulls 2 rams 14 lambs	Numbers 29:20	Recited on the first and second days of Chol Hamoed (third and fourth days of Sukkot) in the Diaspora
Sukkot; Day 4	10 young bulls 2 rams 14 lambs	Numbers 29:23	Recited on the second and third days of Chol Hamoed (fourth and fifth days of Sukkot) in the Diaspora
Sukkot; Day 5	9 young bulls 2 rams 14 lambs	Numbers 29:26	Recited on the third and fourth days of Chol Hamoed (fifth and sixth days of Sukkot) in the Diaspora
Sukkot; Day 6	8 young bulls 2 rams 14 lambs	Numbers 29:29	Recited on the fourth and fifth days of Chol Hamoed (sixth and seventh days of Sukkot) in the Diaspora
Sukkot; Day 7 (Hoshana Rabbah)	7 young bulls 2 rams 14 lambs	Numbers 29:32	
Shemini Atzeret/ Simchat Torah	Elevation offering Fire offering one bull one ram 7 lambs	Numbers 29:35-36	

== See also ==
- Shacharit
- Mincha
- Maariv
- Ne'ila
