= Lee Zeldin =

American politician (born 1980)

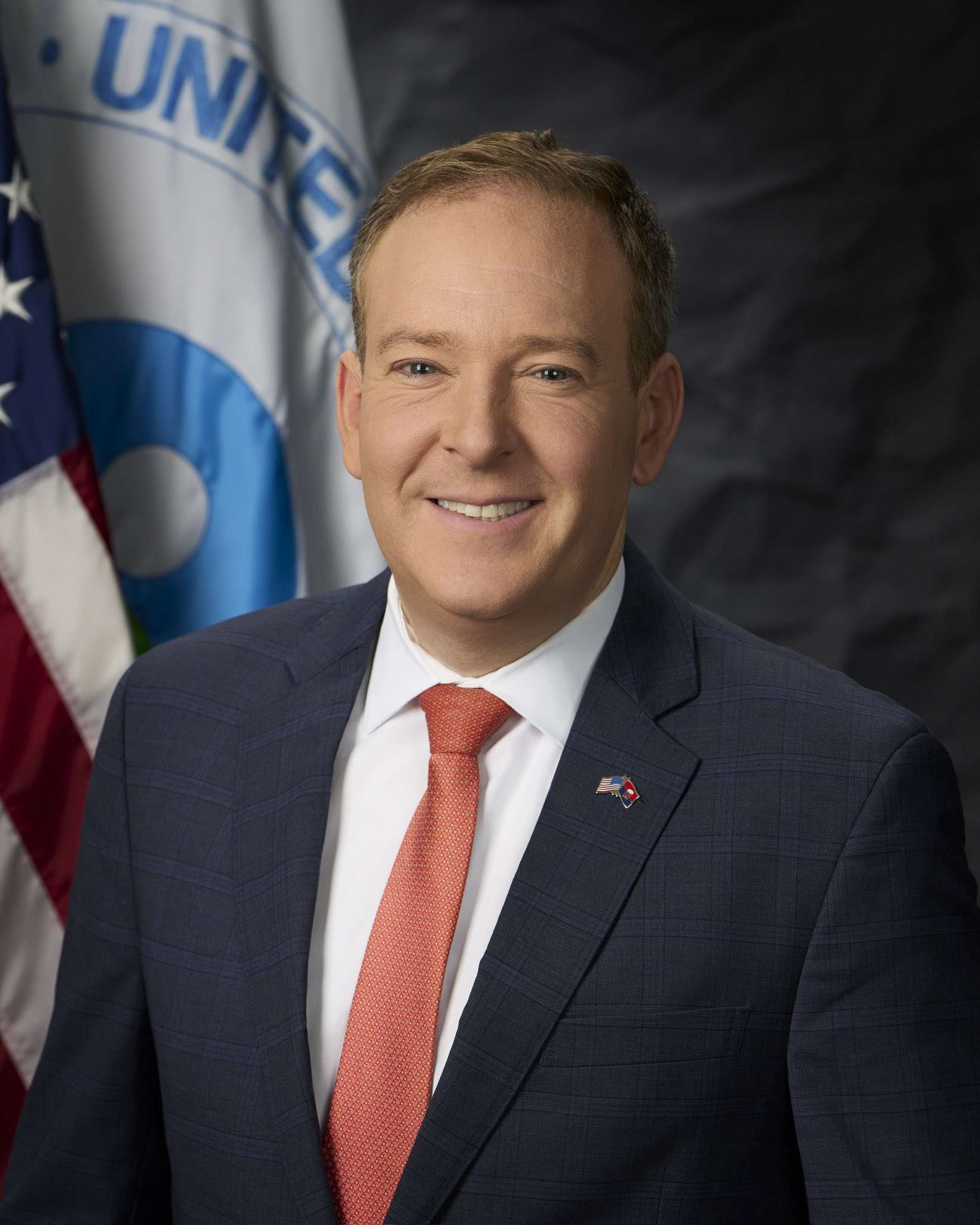
- Official portrait, 2025

17th Administrator of the Environmental Protection Agency
- Incumbent
- Assumed office January 29, 2025
- President: Donald Trump
- Deputy: David Fotouhi
- Preceded by: Michael S. Regan

Member of the U.S. House of Representatives from New York's 1st district
- In office January 3, 2015 – January 3, 2023
- Preceded by: Tim Bishop
- Succeeded by: Nick LaLota

Member of the New York State Senate from the 3rd district
- In office January 1, 2011 – December 31, 2014
- Preceded by: Brian X. Foley
- Succeeded by: Thomas Croci

Personal details
- Born: Lee Michael Zeldin; January 30, 1980 (age 46) East Meadow, New York, U.S.
- Party: Republican
- Spouse: Diana Gidish
- Children: 2
- Relatives: Isaiah Zeldin (uncle)
- Education: University at Albany (BA); Albany Law School (JD)

Military service
- Allegiance: United States
- Branch/service: United States Army; Army Reserve
- Years of service: 2003–2007 (active); 2007–2025 (reserve)
- Rank: Lieutenant Colonel
- Unit: Military Intelligence Corps
- Battles/wars: Global War on Terrorism

Lee Michael Zeldin (born January 30, 1980) is an American politician and lawyer serving as the 17th administrator of the Environmental Protection Agency (EPA) since January 2025. Previously, he served in the United States House of Representatives, representing New York's 1st congressional district from 2015 to 2023, as well as in the New York State Senate, representing the 3rd Senate district from 2011 to 2014. He is a member of the Republican Party.

A close ally of President Donald Trump, Zeldin prominently defended Trump during his first impeachment. Zeldin was the Republican nominee for Governor of New York in 2022; he lost the election to incumbent governor Kathy Hochul.

In 2025, Zeldin became the administrator of the EPA as part of the second administration of President Trump and proposed major deregulation actions at the agency.

== Early life and education ==
Zeldin was born on January 30, 1980, in East Meadow, New York, the son of Merrill Schwartz and David Zeldin. His father was a private investigator and his mother was a fourth-grade teacher. They divorced when Zeldin was young. He was raised in Shirley in Long Island, New York, and graduated from William Floyd High School in Mastic Beach, New York, in 1998. Zeldin's family is Jewish and he attended Hebrew school. His uncle Isaiah Zeldin was a rabbi who founded Stephen Wise Temple, a Reform synagogue in Los Angeles.

Zeldin graduated from SUNY University at Albany in 2001 with a Bachelor of Arts in political science and from Albany Law School in 2003 with a Juris Doctor. He passed the bar exam and was admitted to the New York State Bar in 2004, becoming the youngest lawyer in New York at the time.

=== Military service and legal practice ===
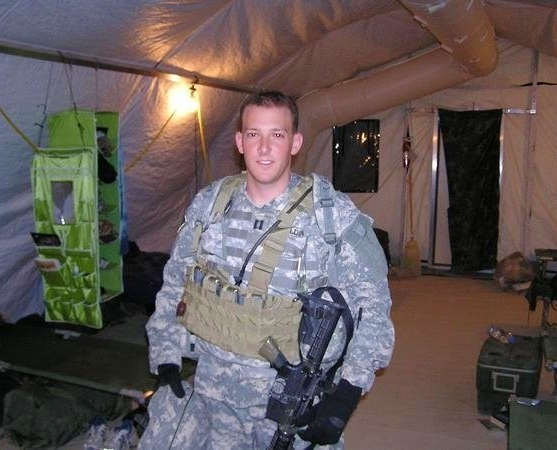
Zeldin on deployment to Iraq, 2006

Zeldin received an Army ROTC commission as a second lieutenant, and served in the United States Army from 2003 to 2007, where he initially joined the Military Intelligence Corps. In 2007, he transitioned from active duty to the Army Reserve, where he achieved the rank of lieutenant colonel before his retirement on April 30, 2025.

In 2007, Zeldin became an attorney for the Port Authority of New York and New Jersey. In 2008, he started a general-practice law firm in Smithtown, New York that he ran until his election to New York's 3rd State Senate district in 2010.

== New York State Senate (2011–2014) ==
In 2010, Zeldin ran in the New York State Senate's 3rd District, challenging Democratic incumbent Brian X. Foley. Zeldin defeated Foley with 57% of the vote. Zeldin was reelected in 2012, defeating Democrat Francis Genco with 56% of the vote.

In January 2011, a bill co-sponsored by Zeldin provided for a 2% property tax cap to become law.

In June 2011, Zeldin voted against the Marriage Equality Act, which the Senate passed 33–29. Governor Andrew Cuomo signed the bill into law. In a statement after the bill passed, Zeldin said: "It is my belief that marriage should be defined as between a man and a woman."

In December 2011, Zeldin supported a $250 million cut to the MTA payroll tax.

In March 2012, Zeldin helped to create the PFC Joseph Dwyer PTSD Peer-to-Peer Veterans Support program; funding for the program was included in the 2012–13 New York State Budget.

In February 2014, Zeldin introduced a bill that sought to halt implementation of the Common Core curriculum for three years.

In March 2014, Zeldin voted against the New York Dream Act, which would allow undocumented students who meet in-state tuition requirements to obtain financial aid to study at the university level.

== U.S. House of Representatives (2015–2023) ==
=== Elections ===
==== 2008 ====
In 2008, Zeldin challenged incumbent representative Tim Bishop in New York's 1st congressional district. Bishop defeated Zeldin 58%–42%.

==== 2014 ====
On October 6, 2013, Zeldin announced he would again seek the Republican nomination to run against Bishop. His state senate district included much of the congressional district's western portion.

Zeldin defeated George Demos in the Republican primary and ran unopposed for the Conservative Party nomination in the June 24 primary. On November 4, he defeated Bishop with 54% of the vote.

==== 2016 ====
In February 2015, the National Republican Congressional Committee announced that Zeldin was one of 12 members in the Patriot Program, a program designed to help protect vulnerable Republican incumbents in the 2016 election.

In the 2016 Republican primary, Zeldin faced no opposition. In the November 8 general election, he faced Democratic nominee Anna Throne-Holst, a member of the Southampton Town Board. Zeldin won with 58% of the vote.

==== 2018 ====
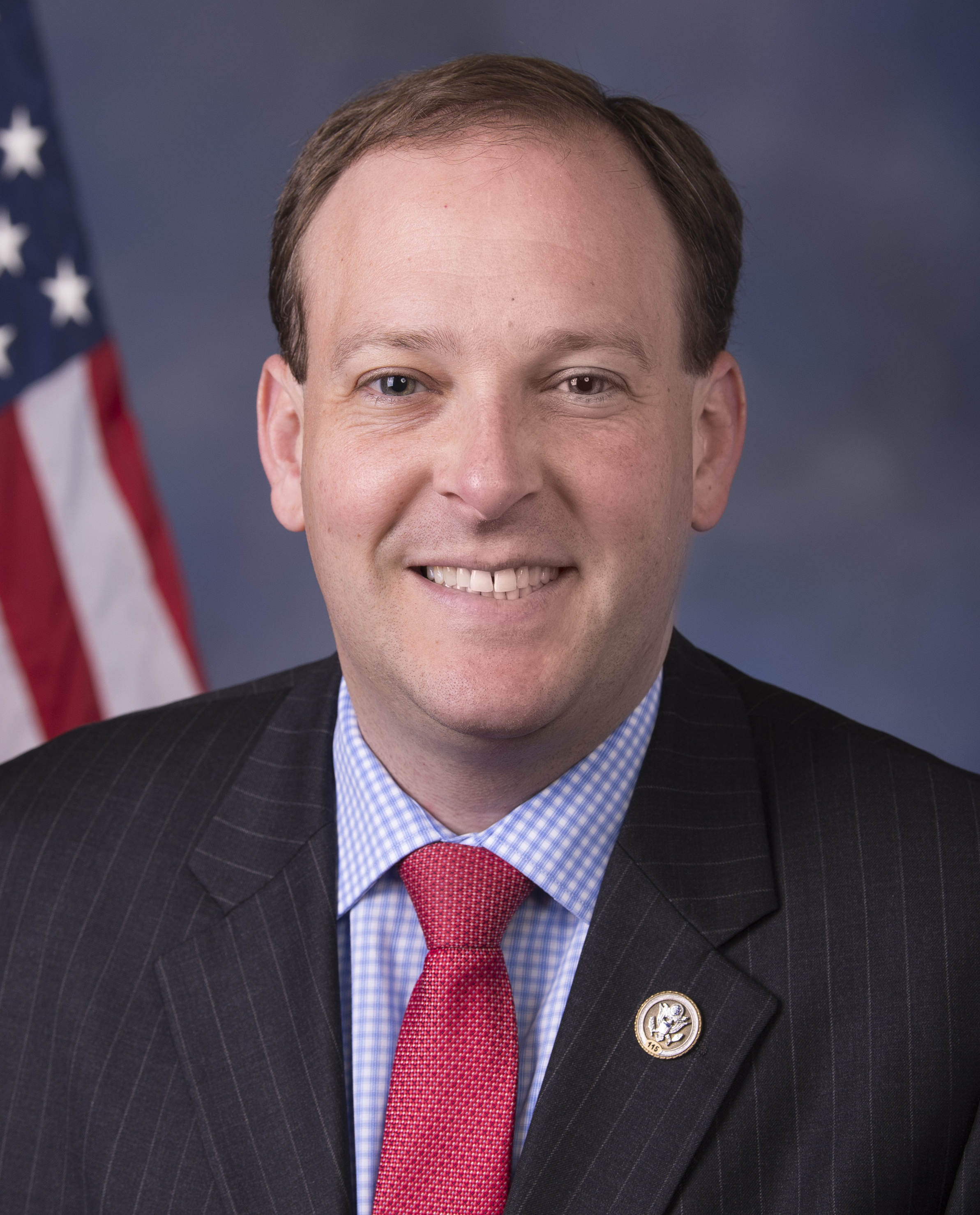
Zeldin during the 115th Congress

Zeldin ran unopposed in the 2018 Republican primary. In the November general election his chief opponent was Democratic nominee Perry Gershon, who also had the endorsement of the Working Families Party.

Zeldin's 2018 campaign featured fundraisers with Breitbart News founder Steve Bannon and Sebastian Gorka. At the Gorka event, reporters from local news outlets were removed.

Zeldin defeated Gershon, 51.5%–47.4%.

==== 2020 ====
Zeldin ran unopposed in the Republican primary. In the November 3 general election, he defeated Democratic nominee Nancy Goroff, 54.9%–45.1%.

=== Committee assignments ===
- Committee on Foreign Affairs
  - Subcommittee on the Middle East and North Africa
  - Subcommittee on Terrorism, Nonproliferation, and Trade
- Committee on Financial Services
  - Subcommittee on Housing and Insurance
  - Subcommittee on Oversight and Investigations
  - Subcommittee on Terrorism and Illicit Finance

=== Caucus memberships ===
- Bipartisan Heroin and Opioids Task Force
- Congressional Addiction, Treatment and Recovery Caucus
- Congressional Estuary Caucus
- Conservative Climate Caucus
- Climate Solutions Caucus
- House Republican Israel Caucus (co-chair)
- Long Island Sound Caucus (co-chair)
- Republican Main Street Partnership

== New York 2022 gubernatorial campaign ==
In April 2021, Zeldin announced he would run for governor of New York in 2022. On April 30, 2021, Zeldin announced that Erie and Niagara counties' Republican Party chairs had endorsed his campaign, giving him the necessary 50% of state committee support to gain the Republican nomination. In June 2021, Republican state chair Nick Langworthy named Zeldin the party's "presumed nominee" after he earned 85% of a straw poll vote of county leaders. Conservative state chair Gerard Kassar also called Zeldin the "presumptive nominee" of the Conservative Party of New York State. By August 2021, Zeldin had been endorsed by 49 of New York's 62 county Republican party chairs.

Zeldin's campaign raised $4 million during the first half of 2021 and $4.3 million in the second half. 90% of his donations were small-dollar donations. Zeldin visited every county in New York State twice during his campaign. In November 2021, he declined to commit to campaigning with Donald Trump, saying, "There are plenty of New Yorkers who love him, there are plenty of New Yorkers out there who don't."

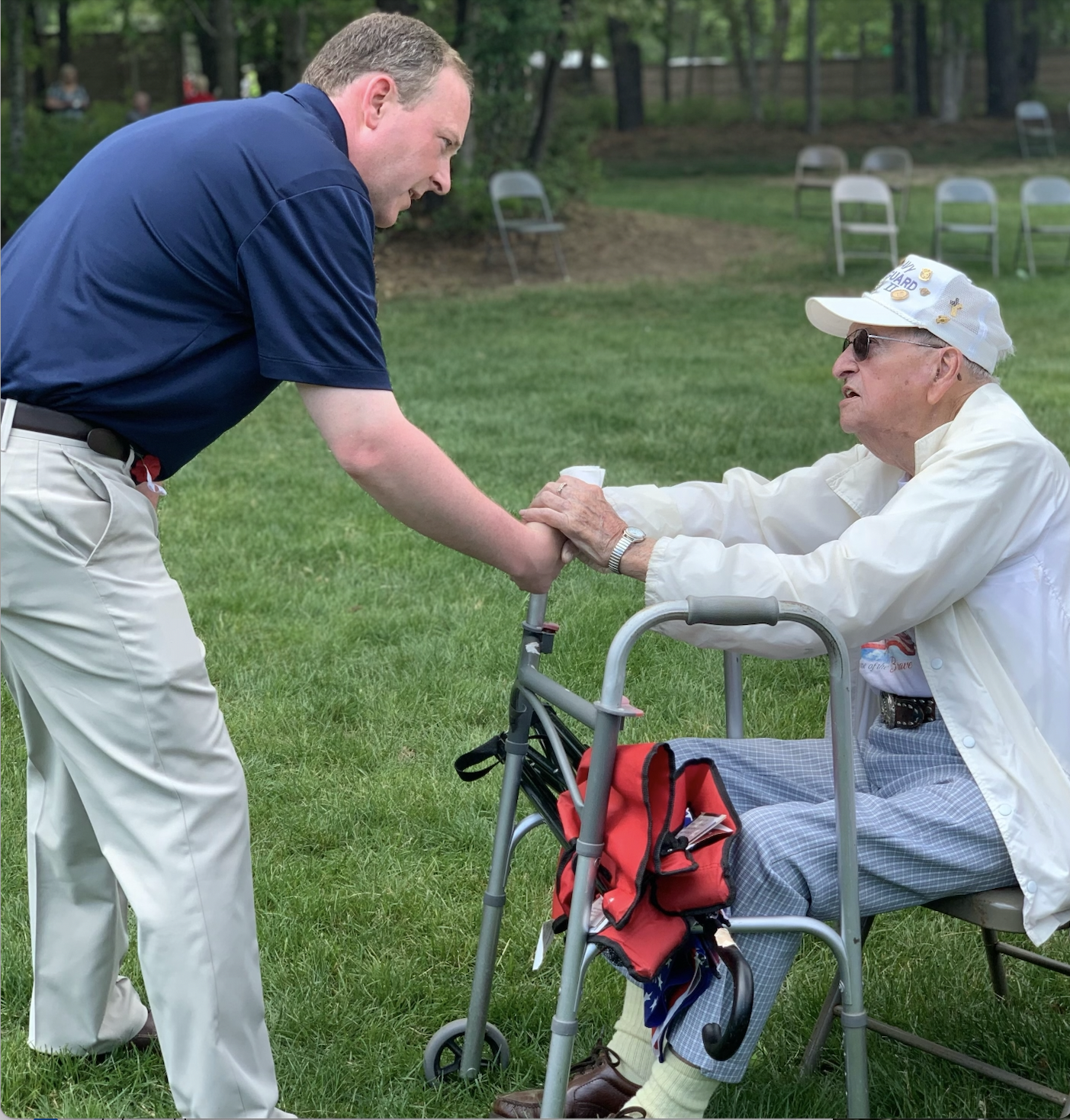
Zeldin campaigning in 2022

On March 1, 2022, Zeldin received the New York Republican State Committee's designation for governor of New York; 85% of the committee voted to back him. He also received the Conservative Party's designation. Zeldin's preferred pick for lieutenant governor, retired NYPD Deputy Inspector Alison Esposito, ran unopposed and also received the state party's designation.

Zeldin faced Rob Astorino, Andrew Giuliani, and Harry Wilson in the 2022 Republican gubernatorial primary and was declared the winner on June 29, 2022. He faced incumbent governor Kathy Hochul in the November general election.

Two additional petitions were circulated for the Republican slate. The Independence Party of New York, which had previously ran Cuomo, filed with the New York State Board of Elections, with the Republican slate seeking to restore the Independence Party line. The party had lost ballot status in 2020. On July 14, 2022, the Board of Elections denied the petitions submitted by the Zeldin campaign, due to contested signatures. A petition for the Parent Party was also filed with the New York State Board of Elections, with the Republican slate seeking to create the Parent Party line. The Parent Party endorsed Lee Zeldin and the Republican slate in May 2022. In July 2022, the Board of Elections rejected the party's petitions for ballot access. Zeldin only appeared on two lines, the Republican and Conservative Party lines, the first time since the 2006 election.

Although the election was closer than most gubernatorial contests since 2002, Zeldin lost to Hochul, 53.2% to 46.8%. He received the highest percentage of the vote for a Republican gubernatorial nominee since 2002 and the highest raw vote total for a Republican gubernatorial nominee since 1970. Conservative policy magazine City Journal wrote that Zeldin's "strong showing helped flip four congressional seats red", contributing to the GOP's narrow House majority that year.

=== Attack ===
On July 21, 2022, Zeldin was attacked at a campaign event in Perinton, New York. A man, later identified as David Jakubonis, got on the stage while Zeldin was giving a speech and attacked him with a pointed plastic key chain intended to be used for self-defense. AMVETS national director Joe Chenelly stopped the attacker. The Monroe County Sheriff's Department detained the man before releasing him the next day without bail. Monroe County district attorney Sandra Doorley, who was also a co-chair of Zeldin's campaign, recused herself from the case because she was at the event. After his initial release, Jakubonis was arrested on federal assault charges. After being indicted, he said he had been drinking on the day of the attack and "did not know who" Zeldin was. In December 2023, Jakubonis was sentenced to three years of probation.

=== Campaign positions ===
During his gubernatorial campaign, Zeldin pledged to reverse New York state's 2015 ban on hydraulic fracturing.

Zeldin opposes abortion but has said that regardless of what the Supreme Court decides on Roe v. Wade, "nothing changes in the state of New York", where abortion is legal. When the court overturned Roe v. Wade in June 2022, Zeldin said it was "a victory for life, for family, for the Constitution, and for federalism". In April 2022, Zeldin said it would be "a great idea" to appoint a health commissioner who opposed abortion. In October 2022, Zeldin said that as governor, he would not change New York's abortion laws.

Zeldin has opposed New York's bail reform, which went into effect on January 1, 2020, eliminating cash bail for most misdemeanor and nonviolent felony charges, repeatedly calling for its repeal.

== Political action committee ==
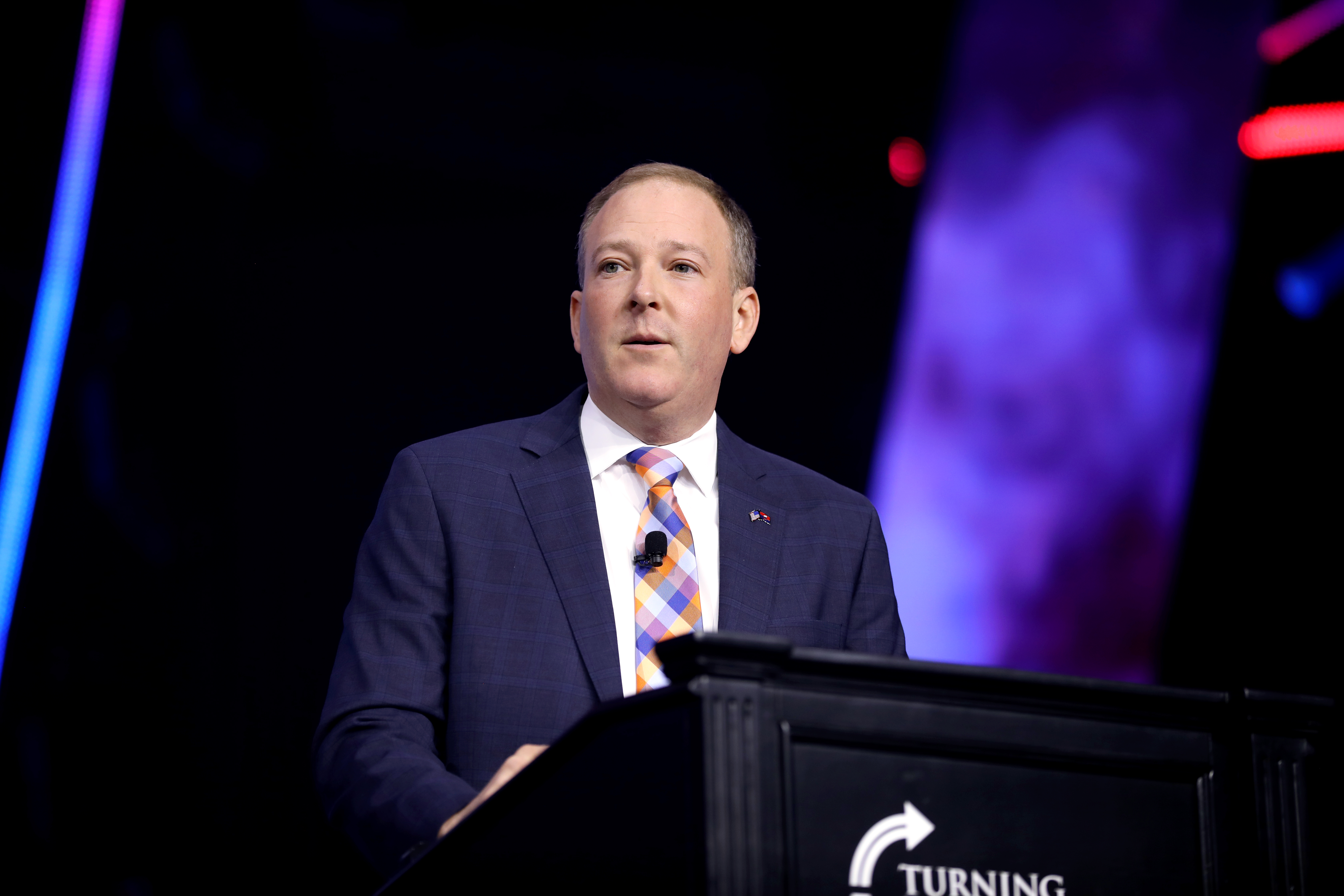
Zeldin in 2024

In 2023, Zeldin launched Leadership America Needs, a PAC aimed at increasing Republican turnout among the young and voters of color.

== Administrator of the Environmental Protection Agency (2025–present) ==
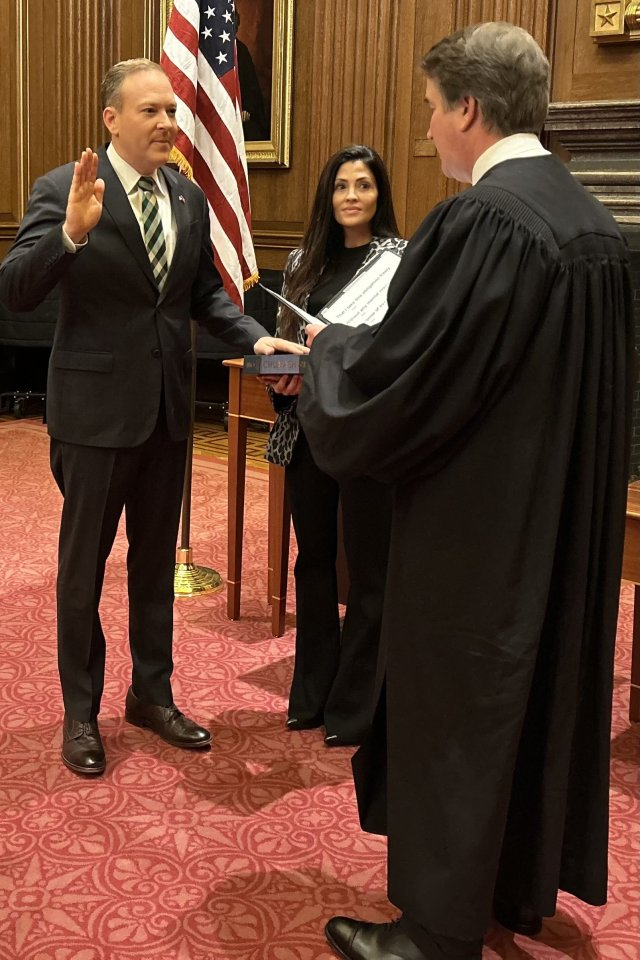
Zeldin being sworn in by Associate Justice Brett Kavanaugh on January 29, 2025

=== Nomination and confirmation ===
In November 2024, CNN reported that Zeldin was Trump's nominee for Administrator of the Environmental Protection Agency. His confirmation hearing was held on January 16, 2025. The committee advanced his nomination in a 11–8 vote on January 23.

During his confirmation hearing for EPA Director, Zeldin stated that climate change is a real issue and needs to be addressed.

He was confirmed by the Senate on January 29, in a 56–42 vote. Democratic Senators John Fetterman, Mark Kelly, and Ruben Gallego joined all Republicans in voting for Zeldin.

=== Tenure ===
On January 29, Supreme Court Justice Brett Kavanaugh swore Zeldin into office as the 17th administrator of the Environmental Protection Agency. In March 2025, Zeldin presented what he described as the "largest deregulatory announcement in U.S. history" for the agency to do "its part to usher in a golden age of American success" by halting and rolling back actions of the previous administration. Staffing the senior leadership with former industry lobbyists, the agency announced plans to cut agency jobs, eliminate its scientific research arm, and reduce the EPA's budget by 65%.

In February 2025, the administration terminated the Environmental and Climate Justice Block Grant Program. In June 2026, district judge Richard Gergel ruled that the terminations were unlawful and in July 2026 a federal judge ordered the program's remaining $2.8 billion in funds be distributed.

During his tenure at the EPA, Zeldin has pushed for substantial environmental deregulation, including going after rules aimed at cutting emissions from power plants, preventing pollution of waterways, and Biden-era restrictions on chemicals.

In March 2025, the Climate United Fund, a nonprofit that was awarded nearly $7 billion by the Biden administration to finance energy and climate projects, sued the EPA, accusing it of improperly freezing a grant.

In March 2025, the EPA informed coal and oil-burning power plants that they could potentially bypass environmental restrictions by sending an email to the agency requesting an exemption. By April 15, nearly 70 coal power plants were exempted. Zeldin also said that he would allow coal-burning power plants to apply for exemptions for coal ash pollution. The New Yorker wrote that the EPA under Zeldin "has come out officially, if astonishingly, as pro-coal".

In May 2025, the EPA rolled back limits on forever chemicals in drinking water. Zeldin stated that the EPA was dedicated to protecting Americans from forever chemicals in drinking water, but that the agency also wanted "common-sense flexibility in the form of additional time for compliance". In July 2025, Zeldin announced the closure of the EPA's Office of Research and Development.

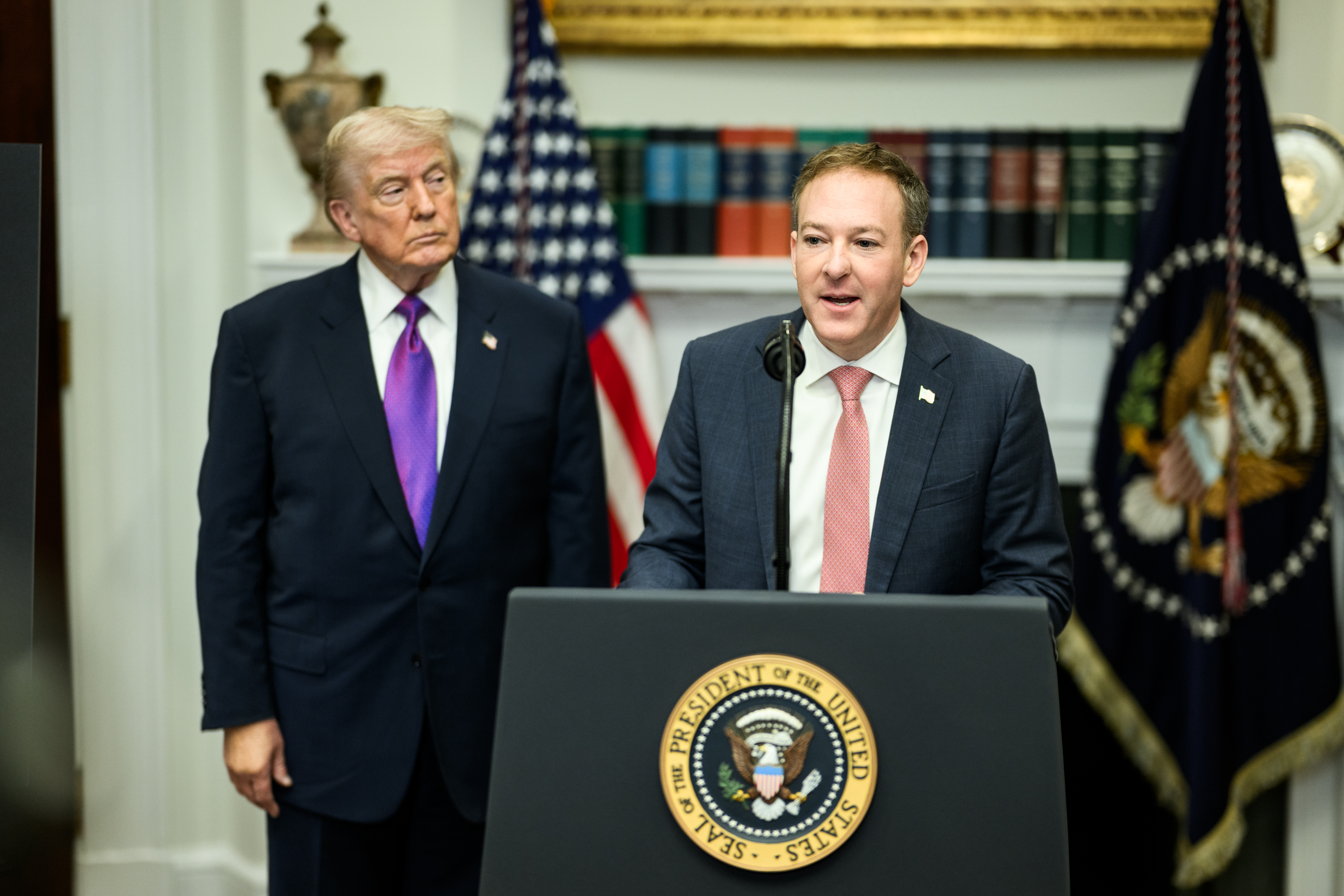
Zeldin and President Donald Trump make an announcement rescinding the 2009 Environmental Protection Agency endangerment finding, 2026

As EPA head, Zeldin has described concerns about global warming as a "religion" and efforts to combat it as a "scam." In July 2025, Zeldin announced a repeal of the endangerment finding, which declares greenhouse gases a public health threat and which forms the basis of the government's legal authority to act on climate change. Zeldin described this as "the largest act of deregulation in the history of the United States". The formal process of repealing the endangerment finding was finalized by President Donald Trump on February 12, 2026.

In July 2025, Zeldin and Mexican Environment Minister Alicia Barcena announced an agreement aimed at a permanent solution to the problem of sewage entering the Tijuana River from Mexico and contaminating the Pacific Ocean across the border near San Diego.

In April 2026, he was reportedly being considered as the next nominee for United States attorney general.

== Personal life ==
Zeldin was raised within a mix of Conservative Judaism and Reform Judaism, the grandson of Reform and Conservative rabbis, while his wife Diana is Mormon. The couple have identical twin daughters. They live in Shirley, New York. In 2024, the Zeldins purchased a home in Washington, D.C. on a primary residence mortgage while maintaining a primary residence mortgage received in 2007 on their home in Shirley. Zeldin is a member of B'nai Israel Reform Temple in Oakdale. His grandfather, Rabbi Abraham Jacob "Jack" Zeldin, founded Farmingdale Jewish Center, a Conservative synagogue. His great-uncle Isaiah Zeldin was a prominent rabbi who founded the Stephen S. Wise Temple in Los Angeles, and his great-grandfather Morris A. Zeldin cofounded the UJA-Federation of New York. As of August 2020, Zeldin was one of two Jewish Republicans in Congress.

On September 18, 2021, Zeldin announced that he had been diagnosed with leukemia in November 2020 but had achieved disease remission following treatment.

== Political positions ==
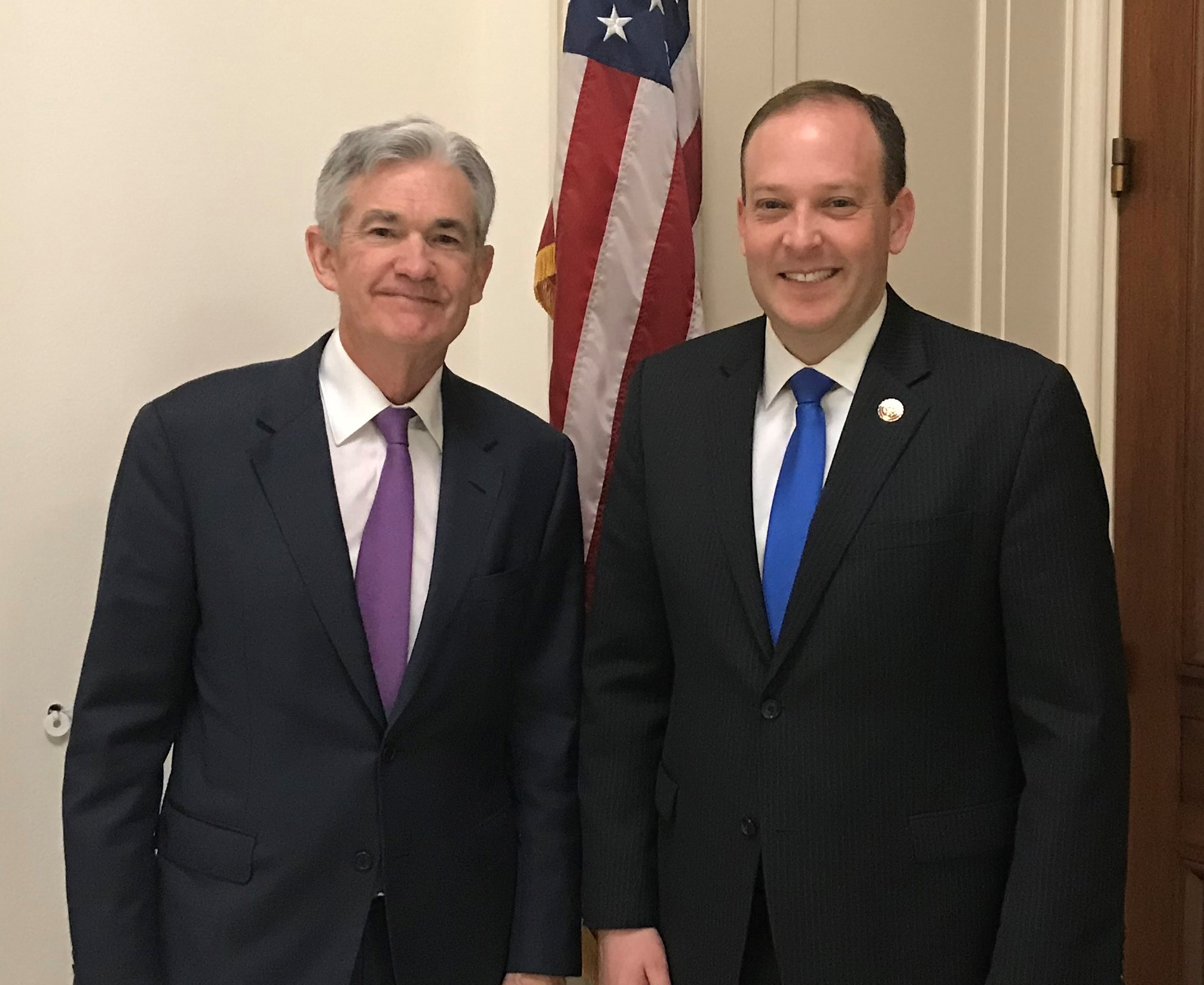
Zeldin with Federal Reserve Chair Jerome Powell in 2019

During his time in Congress, he voted mostly along party lines.

=== Abortion ===
In May 2015, Zeldin voted for the Pain-Capable Unborn Child Protection Act, a bill he co-sponsored, which would prohibit abortions in cases where the fetus's probable age is 20 weeks or more, with exceptions in cases of rape, incest, or if the mother's life was in danger. The act would also impose criminal penalties on doctors who violated the ban. It did not pass.

On September 18, 2015, Zeldin voted for the Defund Planned Parenthood Act of 2015, a bill that would defund the nonprofit organization Planned Parenthood for one year unless the organization agreed not to provide abortion services.

In January 2020, Zeldin joined an amicus curiae brief encouraging the U.S. Supreme Court to overturn Roe v. Wade.

=== Education ===
In July 2015, Zeldin attached an amendment to the Student Success Act to allow states to opt out of Common Core without penalty. The amendment was passed and signed into law.

=== Environment ===
In 2014, Zeldin "expressed doubts about the severity" of climate change. While some sources have since stated that Zeldin denies the scientific consensus on climate change, in 2025, Zeldin said that climate change is a real issue and needs to be addressed.

In April 2015, Zeldin and Senator Chuck Schumer introduced the Fluke Fairness Act. The bill would have changed the current system for managing fluke fishing quotas by creating a regional approach to updating quotas and standards based on geographic, scientific, and economic data. It did not pass.

On July 15, 2015, Zeldin introduced the Exclusive Economic Zone Clarification Act. The bill proposed to amend the boundary in part of the federal Exclusive Economic Zone (EEZ). It would give fisheries management of Block Island Sound exclusively to New York and Rhode Island. (Some Connecticut fishermen alleged that the bill could put them out of business.) The bill died in committee.

In September 2015, Zeldin and Citizens Campaign for the Environment executive director Adrienne Esposito condemned a proposed federal plan for dumping dredged materials, saying, "We can't just assume that dumping these waste spoils in the Long Island Sound is environmentally benign."

In April 2018, Zeldin said he did not support the Paris Agreement. He expressed concern about "other countries that are contributing to very adverse impacts on our climate but not having the level of responsibility that they need to have in stepping up and making a positive change in their own countries".

=== Foreign affairs ===
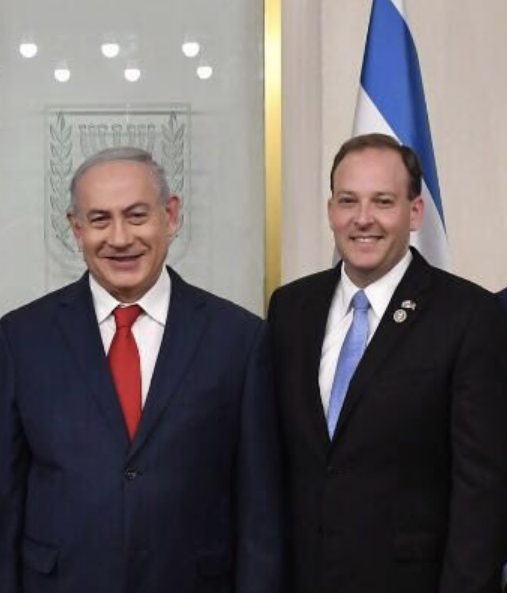
Zeldin with Israeli prime minister Benjamin Netanyahu, 2018

In January 2016, the New York Post reported that Zeldin was a no-show in 2015 at 12 of 18 House Committee on Foreign Affairs hearings that dealt specifically with ISIL and with Syria.

In February 2016, Zeldin and representatives Mike Pompeo and Frank LoBiondo sought visas to travel to Iran to check the country's compliance with the Iran nuclear deal framework. In June 2016, Iran called the request a "publicity stunt" and said it would deny the visas.

Zeldin has said that Israel is "America's strongest ally" and that Congress must "protect Israel's right to self-defense". In 2016, he spoke in support of the anti-Boycott, Divestment and Sanctions (BDS) legislation that passed the New York State Senate. In March 2017, he co-sponsored a bipartisan bill in the House, the Israel Anti-Boycott Act, to oppose boycotts of Israel and "further combat the anti-Israel boycott, divestment and sanctions (BDS) movement". He supported the Trump administration's decision to relocate the U.S. Embassy in Israel from Tel Aviv to Jerusalem in May 2018 as part of the United States recognition of Jerusalem as capital of Israel.

Zeldin spoke highly of the Abraham Accords and nominated Jared Kushner and Avi Berkowitz for a Nobel Peace Prize for their work on the agreement.

Amid the 2022 Russian invasion of Ukraine, Zeldin was one of 963 Americans the Russian Foreign Ministry banned from entering Russia.

=== Health care ===
In 2015, Zeldin co-sponsored two bills in Congress to combat Lyme disease, the Tick-Borne Disease Research and Accountability and Transparency Act of 2015 and the 21st Century Cures Act.

On May 4, 2017, Zeldin voted to repeal the Affordable Care Act (Obamacare) and pass the American Health Care Act.

According to an April 2020 announcement by Zeldin, he helped Suffolk County obtain more than 1.2 million pieces of personal protective equipment from the White House for Suffolk County to aid workers against the COVID-19 pandemic, after conversations with Jared Kushner.

After Governor Kathy Hochul imposed a vaccination mandate on healthcare workers, Zeldin criticized Stony Brook University Hospital for firing employees who declined to be vaccinated against COVID-19 and for using incendiary language in termination letters to those employees. He opposed mask mandates and COVID-19 vaccine mandates for schoolchildren.

=== Infrastructure ===
Zeldin voted against both the bipartisan Infrastructure Investment and Jobs Act on July 1, 2021, and the Senate amendment to it on November 5, 2021.

=== Land management ===
In April 2016, Zeldin introduced legislation to prevent the federal government's sale of Plum Island to the highest bidder and his bill unanimously passed in May.

=== LGBT rights ===
In June 2015, after the United States Supreme Court ruled in Obergefell v. Hodges that state-level bans on same-sex marriage are unconstitutional, Zeldin would not comment about his view of same-sex marriage, but indicated he believed the issue should have been decided at the state level. A month later, he co-sponsored the First Amendment Defense Act, a bill "to protect individuals and institutions from punitive action by the government – such as revoking tax exempt status or withholding federal grants or benefits – for believing that marriage is between one man and one woman and for opposing sex outside of marriage". Critics of the measure said it would enable people to violate same-sex couples' and their children's legal rights by discriminating against them.

In May 2019, Zeldin voted against the Equality Act.

In July 2022, Zeldin was one of 47 Republican representatives who voted in favor of the Respect for Marriage Act, which would codify the right to same-sex marriage in federal law.

=== Taxes and economic issues ===
In November 2017, Zeldin said he was unsatisfied with the proposed Republican tax bill. He cited his concerns with eliminating the state and local tax deduction (SALT). The same month, House Speaker Paul Ryan canceled plans to attend a fundraiser for Zeldin after Zeldin voted against the House version of the bill. In December, Zeldin called the tax bill "a geographic redistribution of wealth" that takes money from some states while providing tax relief to others. He suggested that the removal of the state tax deduction could have been implemented gradually.

Zeldin voted against the Tax Cuts and Jobs Act of 2017, passed in December 2017. He supported the corporate tax cuts in the bill but did not approve of the limit for property tax deductions, preferring a cap of $20,000 or $25,000 to the $10,000 cap in the bill.

In 2022, he voted against the Inflation Reduction Act.

=== Trump administration ===
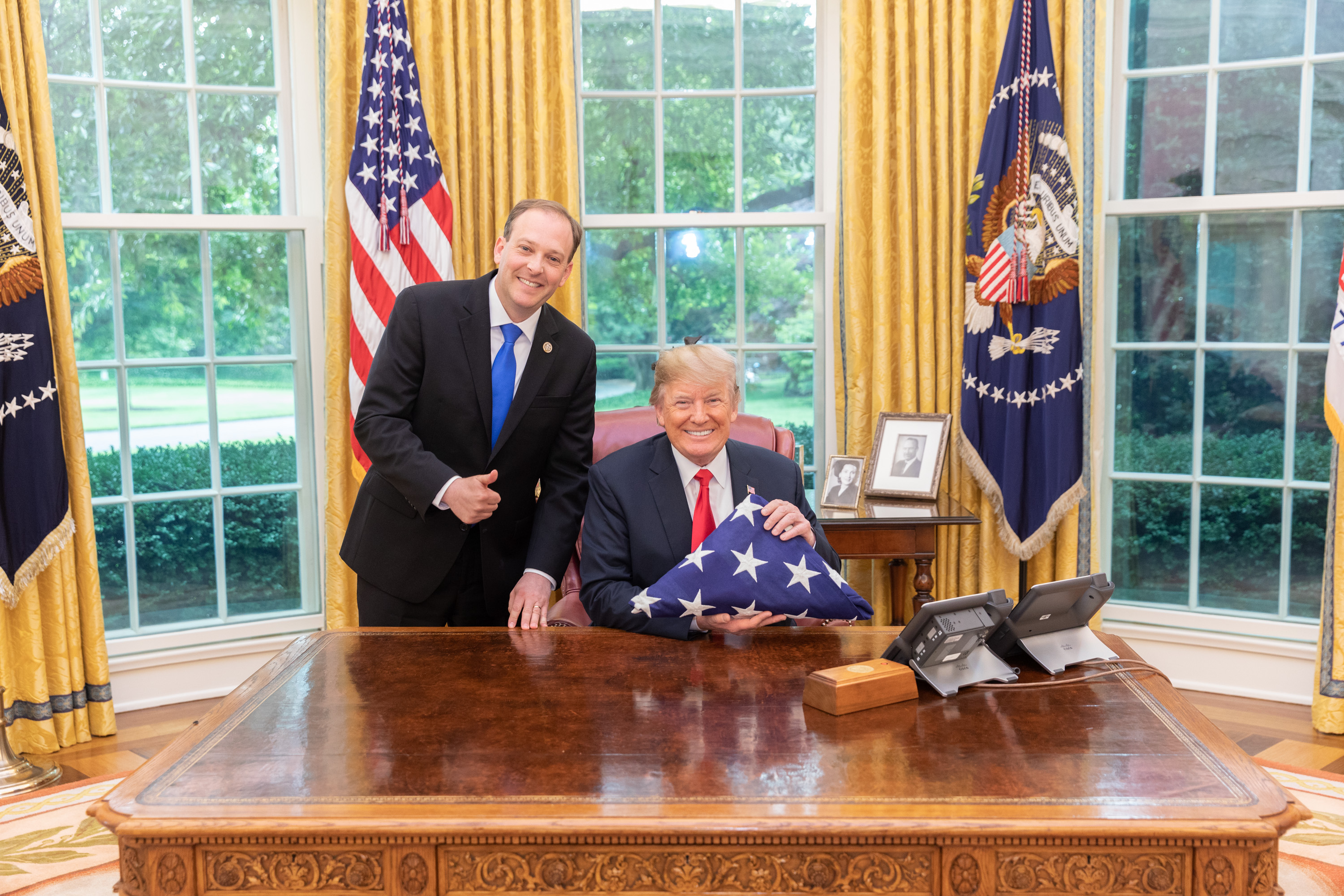
Zeldin with President Donald Trump, 2018

On May 3, 2016, Zeldin endorsed Donald Trump as the Republican presidential nominee. Zeldin had previously indicated that he would support whoever won the Republican nomination. During the campaign, Zeldin faulted Trump for a comment about Khizr and Ghazala Khan, a Gold Star family whose son Humayun, a captain in the Army, was killed during the Iraq War, but said he would continue to support Trump's candidacy.

Zeldin is considered a close Trump ally. In 2017, Zeldin supported Trump's firing of FBI Director James Comey, saying it offered the FBI a chance at a "fresh start" to rebuild trust. In May 2018, Zeldin called for the criminal prosecution of former FBI deputy director Andrew McCabe. Also that month Zeldin called for creating a special counsel investigation into the FBI and the Department of Justice regarding their investigations into Russian interference in the 2016 United States elections. Zeldin said the investigations were launched with "insufficient intelligence and biased motivations", with surveillance warrants for Trump campaign staffers obtained in "deeply flawed and questionable" ways. He called for an investigation into the FBI's decision to conclude its investigation into the Hillary Clinton email controversy.

During the 2018-19 U.S. government shutdown, Zeldin voted with the Republican caucus against the appropriations measure to fund the federal government. He instructed the House to withhold his pay until the shutdown ended, saying: "It's crazy to me that members of Congress get paid while other federal employees do not."

Zeldin prominently defended Trump during his first impeachment hearings concerning the Trump–Ukraine scandal, where Trump requested that Ukrainian president Volodymyr Zelenskyy investigate Democratic presidential candidate Joe Biden and his son Hunter. Zeldin said in October 2019, "It is crystal clear... that any allegation that President Trump was trying to get President Zelensky [sic] to manufacture dirt on the Bidens is just not true." In the seven impeachment deposition transcripts released as of November 2019, no Republican had spoken more than Zeldin, referenced more than 550 times. On February 1, 2020, days before the conclusion of Trump's first impeachment trial, Zeldin opined that Republicans should expunge the impeachment if they won a House majority in the upcoming 2020 House elections, tweeting, "The House of Representatives should EXPUNGE this sham impeachment in January 2021!"

After Trump lost the 2020 presidential election and made false claims of fraud, Zeldin was one of 126 Republican members of the House of Representatives to sign an amicus curiae in support of Texas v. Pennsylvania, a lawsuit filed at the United States Supreme Court contesting the results of the election, in which Biden defeated Trump. The Supreme Court declined to hear the case on the basis that Texas lacked standing under Article III of the Constitution to challenge the results of an election held by another state. When asked in January 2021 to respond to the release of an audio recording of a phone call in which Trump pressured Georgia secretary of state Brad Raffensperger to overturn the 2020 election and "find" enough votes for him to win, Zeldin said "I wish the reporting on it was a full and honest discussion – as opposed to the one-sided, biased take."

After the 2021 United States Capitol attack, Zeldin voted against certification of Arizona's and Pennsylvania's electoral votes. He disavowed the violence and argued with protesters at his Patchogue office who linked his espousal of election fraud conspiracy theories to the Capitol attack and called on him to resign. On January 7, he publicly acknowledged for the first time that Biden would be the next president.

=== Veterans affairs ===
In February 2015, Zeldin introduced his first bill to eliminate the dollar limit for loans that the United States Department of Veterans Affairs can guarantee for a veteran. In February 2016 he proposed federal legislation to fund a three-year, $25-million nationwide veterans' peer-support program modeled on one he helped establish while in the New York State Senate.

== Electoral history ==
2008 New York's 1st congressional district election
Party	Candidate	Votes	%
Democratic	Tim Bishop	141,727	51.0
Working Families	Tim Bishop	7,437	2.7
Independence	Tim Bishop	12,919	4.7
Total	Tim Bishop (incumbent)	162,083	58.4
Republican	Lee Zeldin	100,036	36.0
Conservative	Lee Zeldin	14,470	5.6
Total	Lee Zeldin	115,545	41.6
Total votes		372,642	100.0
Democratic hold			

2010 New York's 3rd State Senate district election
Party	Candidate	Votes	%
Republican	Lee Zeldin	41,063	57.1
Democratic	Brian X. Foley (incumbent)	30,876	42.9
Total votes		71,939	100.0
Republican gain from Democratic			

2012 New York's 3rd State Senate district election
Party	Candidate	Votes	%
Republican	Lee Zeldin (incumbent)	52,057	55.7
Democratic	Francis T. Genco	41,372	44.3
Total votes		93,429	100.0
Republican hold			

2014 New York's Republican 1st congressional district primary
Party	Candidate	Votes	%
Republican	Lee Zeldin	10,283	61.3
Republican	George Demos	6,482	38.7
Total votes		16,765	100.0

2014 New York's 1st congressional district election
Party	Candidate	Votes	%
Republican	Lee Zeldin	77,062	44.6
Conservative	Lee Zeldin	16,973	9.8
Total	Lee Zeldin	94,035	54.4
Democratic	Tim Bishop	68,387	39.6
Working Families	Tim Bishop	5,457	3.2
Independence	Tim Bishop	4,878	2.8
Total	Tim Bishop (incumbent)	78,722	45.6
Total votes		172,757	100.0
Republican gain from Democratic			

2016 New York's 1st congressional district election
Party	Candidate	Votes	%
Republican	Lee Zeldin	158,409	48.9
Conservative	Lee Zeldin	23,327	7.2
Independence	Lee Zeldin	5,920	1.8
Reform	Lee Zeldin	843	0.3
Total	Lee Zeldin (incumbent)	188,499	58.2
Democratic	Anna Throne-Holst	126,635	39.1
Working Families	Anna Throne-Holst	6,147	1.9
Women's Equality	Anna Throne-Holst	2,496	0.8
Total	Anna Throne-Holst	135,278	41.8
Total votes		323,777	100.0
Republican hold			

2018 New York's 1st congressional district election
Party	Candidate	Votes	%
Republican	Lee Zeldin	121,562	45.0
Conservative	Lee Zeldin	14,284	5.3
Independence	Lee Zeldin	2,693	1.0
Reform	Lee Zeldin	488	0.2
Total	Lee Zeldin (incumbent)	139,027	51.5
Democratic	Perry Gershon	124,213	46.0
Working Families	Perry Gershon	3,778	1.4
Total	Perry Gershon	127,991	47.4
Women's Equality	Kate Browning	2,988	1.1
Total votes		270,006	100.0
Republican hold			

2020 New York's 1st congressional district election
Party	Candidate	Votes	%
Republican	Lee Zeldin	180,855	48.2
Conservative	Lee Zeldin	21,611	5.8
Independence	Lee Zeldin	3,249	0.9
Total	Lee Zeldin (incumbent)	205,715	54.9
Democratic	Nancy Goroff	160,978	42.9
Working Families	Nancy Goroff	8,316	2.2
Total	Nancy Goroff	169,294	45.1
Total votes		375,009	100.0
Republican hold			

2022 New York Republican gubernatorial primary
Party	Candidate	Votes	%
Republican	Lee Zeldin	193,184	43.6
Republican	Andrew Giuliani	100,372	22.9
Republican	Rob Astorino	80,223	18.7
Republican	Harry Wilson	64,594	14.8
Total votes		438,373	100

2022 New York gubernatorial election
Party	Candidate	Votes	%	±%
Democratic	Kathy Hochul; Antonio Delgado	2,879,092	48.77%	−7.39%
Working Families	Kathy Hochul; Antonio Delgado	261,323	4.43%	+2.55%
Total	Kathy Hochul (incumbent); Antonio Delgado (incumbent)	3,140,415	53.20%	−6.42%
Republican	Lee Zeldin; Alison Esposito	2,449,394	41.49%	+9.89%
Conservative	Lee Zeldin; Alison Esposito	313,187	5.31%	+1.15%
Total	Lee Zeldin; Alison Esposito	2,762,581	46.80%	+10.59%
Total votes		5,788,802	100.0%	
Turnout		5,902,996	47.74%	
Registered electors		12,124,242		
Democratic hold				

118th Congress Election for the 56th Speaker of the House, Roll Call 521
Party	Candidate	Votes	%
Republican	Jim Jordan	200	46.30%
Republican	Steve Scalise	7	1.62%
Republican	Kevin McCarthy	6	1.39%
Republican	Lee Zeldin	3	0.70%
Republican	Other	4	0.93%
Democratic	Hakeem Jeffries	212	49.07%
Total votes		432	100%

118th Congress Election for the 56th Speaker of the House, Roll Call 523
Party	Candidate	Votes	%
Republican	Jim Jordan	199	46.00%
Republican	Steve Scalise	7	1.62%
Republican	Kevin McCarthy	5	1.15%
Republican	Lee Zeldin	3	0.69%
Republican	Other	7	1.62%
Democratic	Hakeem Jeffries	212	48.96%
Total votes		433	100%

118th Congress Election for the 56th Speaker of the House, Roll Call 525
Party	Candidate	Votes	%
Republican	Jim Jordan	194	45.54%
Republican	Steve Scalise	8	1.87%
Republican	Patrick McHenry	6	1.41%
Republican	Lee Zeldin	4	0.94%
Republican	Other	7	1.64%
Democratic	Hakeem Jeffries	210	49.18%
Total votes		427	100%

== See also ==
- List of Jewish members of the United States Congress

U.S. House of Representatives
Preceded by Tim Bishop	Member of the U.S. House of Representatives from New York's 1st congressional district 2015–2023	Succeeded by Nick LaLota
Party political offices
Preceded by Marc Molinaro	Republican nominee for Governor of New York; 2022	Succeeded by Bruce Blakeman
Political offices
Preceded by Michael S. Regan	Administrator of the Environmental Protection Agency; 2025–present	Incumbent
Order of precedence
Preceded by Stephen Miller as White House Chief of Staff	Order of precedence of the United States as Administrator of the Environmental Protection Agency	Succeeded by Russell Vought as Director of the Office of Management and Budget
