= Women Against Gun Violence =

Women Against Gun Violence (WAGV) was an American non-profit organization based in Los Angeles, California, whose stated goals were “advancing legislation, promoting public awareness, and designing educational programs to help prevent gun violence and to keep all our communities safe.” Their multi-tier approach to reducing gun violence included legislation like background checks for all gun and ammunition sales, and programs on safe gun storage, voting, and divestment.

== History ==
In 1993, brought together by Rabbi Laura Geller — now Rabbi Emerita of Temple Emanuel of Beverly Hills, and with the support and backing of the American Jewish Congress, where the Rabbi was the director of the Pacific Southwest Region — former Los Angeles Police Commissioner Ann Reiss Lane and The Feminine Mystique author and founder of the National Organization for Women, Betty Friedan, joined to found Women Against Gun Violence.

A call from Friedan to Lane inspired the latter to hold a seminar in 1993. Lane was encouraged by Friedan's vision of women “moving beyond the victim stage,” and her viewpoint that the easiest course to end gun violence was to organize women.

Women Against Gun Violence became an official organization in 1994.

Using the model of Mothers Against Drunk Driving and working on a local level to counter both an increase in gun violence and the marketing of guns to women, WAGV connected with small Southern California community groups that had been formed as a direct reaction to gun violence. WAGV held rallies in Downtown Los Angeles and participated in national events, including the first Silent Victims March, held in 1995. The impact installation featured 40,000 pairs of shoes, representing 40,000 annual gun deaths, placed around the fountain in front of the Capitol in Washington, D.C. The shoes came from across the country, and every pair had a note that explained the circumstances of the shooting. WAGV helped send California's 15,000 pairs, including shoes from babies and children. To complement the inaugural Million Mom March in 2000, WAGV organized a support march rally in Downtown Los Angeles.

WAGV and their compatriots picketed, then sued Davis Industries, which specialized in so-called “junk guns,” colloquially known as “Saturday night specials,” which were cheaply made, easy to buy, and easy to use. The guns also malfunctioned, one basis of the multiple suits. The groups’ efforts drove the manufacturer out of California and have been utilized since throughout the United States. As Women Against Gun Violence joined with national coalition partners to support changes in gun laws across the United States, their efforts produced legislative changes in Los Angeles, California. A former commissioner for the Los Angeles Police Department and the first woman president of the Los Angeles Fire Commission, Ann Reiss Lane had strong relationships with members of the city council and government officials, as well as the police and fire departments. In 2015, the Los Angeles City Council strengthened the city's restrictions on firearms, banning the possession of gun magazines that hold more than 10 bullets, and a separate law requiring the safe storage of handguns in residences by using locked containers or trigger locks. WAGV worked for these laws and others, including banning assault weapons in Los Angeles. Understanding the economic and legal realities of weapon bans, WAGV supported gun buyback programs.

While WAGV and their coalition's effort to ban assault weapons in California suffered a setback in October 2023 when U.S. District Judge Roger Benitez of San Diego struck down California's 34-year-old ban on semiautomatic guns, WAGV successfully supported and encouraged the efforts of Senator Anthony J. Portantino (D – Burbank).

Elected in 2016, Portantino authored or co-authored pieces of multiple gun control and gun safety regulations that passed into laws before Benitez's ruling on firearms, and mandated robust investigations of imminent violent school threats, mirroring WAGV's goals in the TALK program.

Keeping guns out of the hands of children was always a focus of Women Against Gun Violence, and their TALK Project provided “lifesaving information about safe gun storage and critical strategies that help prevent the death of children by guns improperly stored and secured.” Portantino's 2022 bill legislated what had become an unfortunate necessity.

Passed in October 2023, SB 368, authored by Portantino, requires a licensed firearms dealer to “accept for storage a firearm transferred by an individual to prevent it from being used during periods of crisis,” while adding restrictions for those who violate 10-year firearms prohibitions. “So far this year alone, there have been almost 18,000 suicides by firearms in the United States, and the suicide rate continues to increase among young people and is at a 10-year high,” said WAGV's executive director Margot Bennett. In 2023, Los Angeles County Supervisors Janice Hahn and Hilda Solis proposed a plan that would allow doctors and nurses at county-operated medical facilities to give out gun locks as part of a harm reduction strategy. WAGV's executive director Margot Bennett called the practice of locking firearms and keeping ammunition stored separately one of the “easiest ways to prevent gun violence.” As of 2023, California had the strictest gun laws in the United States, according to the Giffords Law Center to Prevent Gun Violence, with a firearm homicide rate lower than the national average. After thirty years of social and legislative change, Women Against Gun Violence closed in 2024.
