= Brandeis-Bardin Institute =

Jewish retreat in California

Coordinates: 34.25954°N 118.713166°W

The Brandeis-Bardin Campus of American Jewish University is a Jewish retreat located since 1947 in the northeastern Simi Hills, in the city of Simi Valley, California. Formerly known as the Brandeis-Bardin Institute, it is used for nondenominational summer programs for children, teens, and young adults.

== History ==
The Brandeis-Bardin Institute was founded in 1941 by Shlomo Bardin (Bardinstein), inspired by the ideals of the early Zionist movement and the ideas and financial support of Justice Louis Brandeis. In the 1950s, BBI was known as Brandeis Camp Institute (BCI), with Shlomo Bardin as the Director. The institute branched out into a program for college-aged Jews, now called Brandeis Collegiate Institute, and a summer and winter camp for young people named Alonim.

In 1968 actor James Arness (of Gunsmoke) donated his entire Simi Hills ranch to the adjacent Brandeis Bardin Institute, making it, at 2,200 acres (890 ha), the largest parcel of land owned by a Jewish institution outside the State of Israel.

Founder Dr. Shlomo Bardin ran the Institute until 1976. He is buried on the grounds of the Brandeis Bardin Institute. Dennis Prager ran it from 1976 to 1983. Joseph Wapner sat on the board.

In March 2007, officials from both the Brandeis-Bardin Institute and the University of Judaism, a non-denominational institution of higher education offering undergraduate and graduate degrees along with a rabbinical studies program located in Bel Air, announced they would merge into a new organization called American Jewish University.

In February 2022, American Jewish University planned to sell its 15600 Mulholland Drive, Bel Air location, keeping the 1101 Peppertree Lane, Simi Valley location. The Milken Community School made a bid for the campus of approximately $60 million, but was outbid by a Swiss learning company. That deal fell through amid community opposition. On December 26, 2023, Milken announced that it had successfully reached a deal to buy the campus.

== Alumni ==
Notable people who got their start at the Brandeis-Bardin Institute include Rabbi Zalman Schachter-Shalomi, the founder of Renewal Judaism; and Rabbi Shlomo Carlebach.

Rabbi Zvi Dershowitz directed the Brandeis-Bardin Institute in the early 1960s, before becoming director of Camp Ramah in California and rabbi at Sinai Temple. In the 1970s Rabbis Abraham Joshua Heschel and Mordecai Kaplan frequented the institute. Later Rabbi Joseph Telushkin would lead a weekly Torah discussion at the House of the Book on the campus, and Dennis Prager would be among the many leaders of the institute.

Journalist Daniel Pearl, who was beheaded by Al Qaeda in Pakistan in 2002 (and about whom the Angelina Jolie film A Mighty Heart was made), and his family were long-time supporters of (and campers at) Brandeis.

Actor Skyler Gisondo attended Alonim as a camper before going on to work in several projects including the films Licorice Pizza, Booksmart, and Vacation, as well as the television programs The Righteous Gemstones and Santa Clarita Diet.

== Architecture ==
The campus includes the House of the Book, a performance hall which was designed by architect Sidney Eisenshtat.

Its futuristic-looking brutalist design has made it attractive as a filming location, and it has appeared in numerous film and television projects.

=== Use as filming location ===
The building has featured in the following productions:

- The Autrey School and Weiss Jewish Community Center in S.W.A.T. S04 E08
- Camp Khitomer in Star Trek VI: The Undiscovered Country
- Lore's Borg compound in the Star Trek: The Next Generation episode "Descent"
- The Command Center, later known as the Power Chamber, for Mighty Morphin Power Rangers to Power Rangers Turbo.
- The Lawnmower Man
- Marilyn Manson's video for "The Dope Show"
- Chris Brown's video for "Wall to Wall"
- Kelly Price's video for "As We Lay"
- The Rock & Roll History Museum in Tenacious D in The Pick of Destiny
- The rear of the building (and surrounding vegetation) was featured in a recent Lexus commercial.
- Exterior and outside (around the grounds) of the House of Book and the institute were used for Mystery Woman: Vision of a Murder.
- The prison Camp Holliday in the movie Wedlock with Rutger Hauer.
- In the mid-'80s revival of The Twilight Zone, the episode "Dead Run", a scene between the Administrator of Hell and a new truck driver takes place here.
- The Wrenwood Center in Todd Haynes' Safe (1995) uses the House of the Book's interior and the camp's buildings and wilderness.
- The Atmospheric Research Institute exteriors in The Storm (2009) mini-series.
- The museum in the 7th episode of the 3rd season of Chuck titled "Chuck Versus the Mask"
- The compound of the "Visualize" cult in the CBS show The Mentalist, a season 2 episode titled "Red All Over", season 3 episode 3 title "The Blood on His Hands", season 4 episode titled "His Thoughts Were Red Thoughts", a season 5 episode 13 title "The Red Barn."
- Earthonomy Headquarters in the Diagnosis: Murder episode "Dance of Danger"
- Several buildings, interior and exterior, of the cult on HBO's series "Big Love"
- In episode six of V.I.P., "Diamonds are a Val's Best Friend", in an exterior scene with Tasha, played by Molly Culver, taking photos. The name of the building was Protocon International.
- In Season 4 Episode 7 of Station 19 (Learning to fly) as the location of a cult.
- Reality
- In the film "Secret Agent Club" starring Hulk Hogan
- The building served as the inspiration for Outpost 3 in "American Horror Story: Apocalypse"
- The house of Jordan, played by Maria Bello, in the Netflix series Beef (2023).
- In the music video for the song "Young Metro" by Future (rapper), The Weeknd and Metro Boomin (2024).
- In the short film and teaser trailer for Kendrick Lamar's album GNX (2024).
- In the music video for the song "Luther" by Kendrick Lamar and SZA (2025).

== See also ==
- Jews and Judaism in Los Angeles
- Simi Hills topics
