= Wise Temple =

Wise Temple may refer to:

- Isaac M. Wise Temple, Cincinnati, Ohio
- Stephen S. Wise Temple, Los Angeles, California
  - Stephen S. Wise Temple Elementary School
