= Zvi Dershowitz =

Czech–born American rabbi (1928–2023)

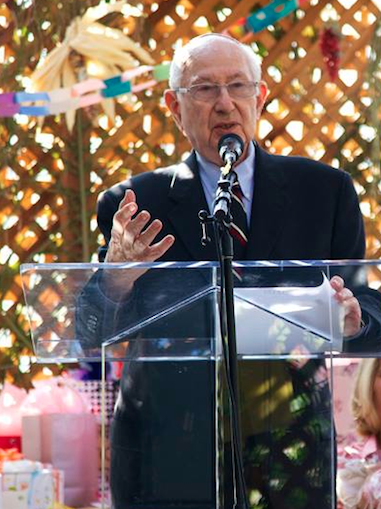
- 2014
- Born: Hugo Zvi Dershowitz; May 4, 1928; Brno, Czechoslovakia
- Died: March 26, 2023 (aged 94); Los Angeles, California, U.S.
- Occupation: Rabbi at Sinai Temple
- Spouse: Tova
- Children: 4

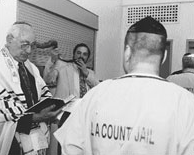
Leading services at the Twin Towers Correctional Facility and the Men's Central Jail in Los Angeles on September 21, 2000, shortly before Rosh Hashanah (the Jewish New Year)

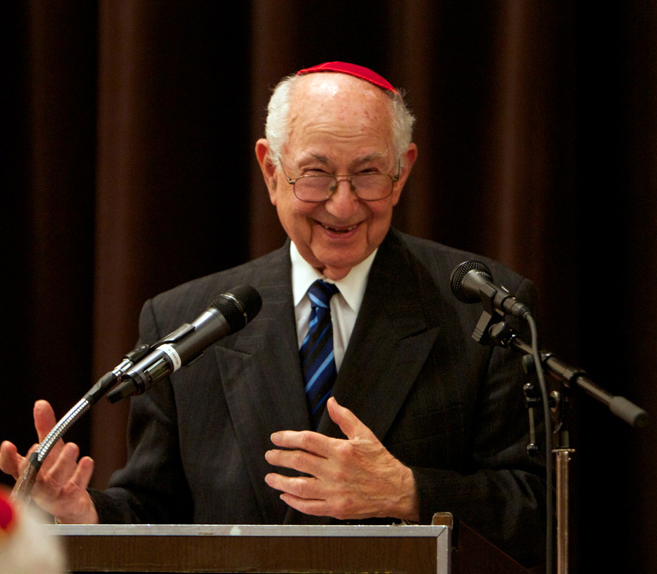
Speech to Sinai Temple's Men's Club in 2012

Zvi Dershowitz (May 4, 1928 – March 26, 2023) was a Czech-born American rabbi whose tenure included 50 years serving Sinai Temple in Los Angeles.

== Early life ==
Dershowitz was born in Brno, Czechoslovakia in 1928. In 1938, just 33 days before the Nazis invaded, Dershowitz fled the country with his family (when he was just 10 years old). On February 2, 1939, Zvi emigrated to New York City along with his parents, Aaron and Ruth, and sister Lili. They settled in Brooklyn, in the Williamsburg neighborhood. There, he learned English, attended Mesivta Torah Vodaath, and became ordained as a rabbi in Orthodox Judaism in 1953. However, throughout his life, Dershowitz affiliated with Conservative Judaism, and considered himself a Conservative rabbi.

In 1949, Dershowitz spent a year studying in Jerusalem, where he helped Jewish refugees from Yemen and elsewhere in the newly established State of Israel. Dershowitz met his wife Tova while recruiting in Ithaca, New York for Camp Soleil. They married in 1953.

== Career ==
Dershowitz later became rabbi at Temple Beth Shalom in Kansas City, Missouri before moving to St. Paul, Minnesota where he became a rabbi at the Temple of Aaron. He later went on to direct many Jewish summer camps, including Herzl Camp in Wisconsin from 1954 to 1961, Camp Alonim/Brandeis-Bardin Institute (BCI) in Simi Valley, CA, from 1961 to 1963, and directed Camp Ramah in California for 10 years, from 1963 to 1973, making him the longest serving director in that camp's history.

In 1973, Dershowitz became associate rabbi at Sinai Temple. He would remain in that role for 25 years before becoming the synagogue's Rabbi Emeritus in 1998. He also served as the synagogue's interim head rabbi on many occasions, including the year before Rabbi David Wolpe was hired. In his tenure at Sinai, he helped Iranian Jews who were fleeing their country get entry to the United States in 1979. Dershowitz is credited with welcoming them to the community and helping them adjust to life in America. An immigrant himself, Dershowitz said, "I believe every Jew is responsible for every other Jew." Dershowitz is also credited with serving the congregation well in times of crisis. He retired after 25 years of serving on the pulpit, and continued to serve as the congregation's Rabbi Emeritus, thereby making him the longest serving rabbi in Sinai Temple's history. Dershowitz continued to work with bar/bat Mitzvah students at the synagogue for many years, and also conducted life cycle events including baby namings, weddings, and funerals.

For many years, Dershowitz also served as the chaplain from the local Board of Rabbis of Southern California to the Los Angeles jail system.

== Personal life ==
Dershowitz was related to Harvard Law professor Alan Dershowitz. Dershowitz and his late wife Tova had four children, nine grandchildren, and seven great-grandchildren.

Dershowitz died on March 26, 2023, at the age of 94.
