= Isaiah Zeldin =

American rabbi (1920–2018)

- ישעיהו זלדין
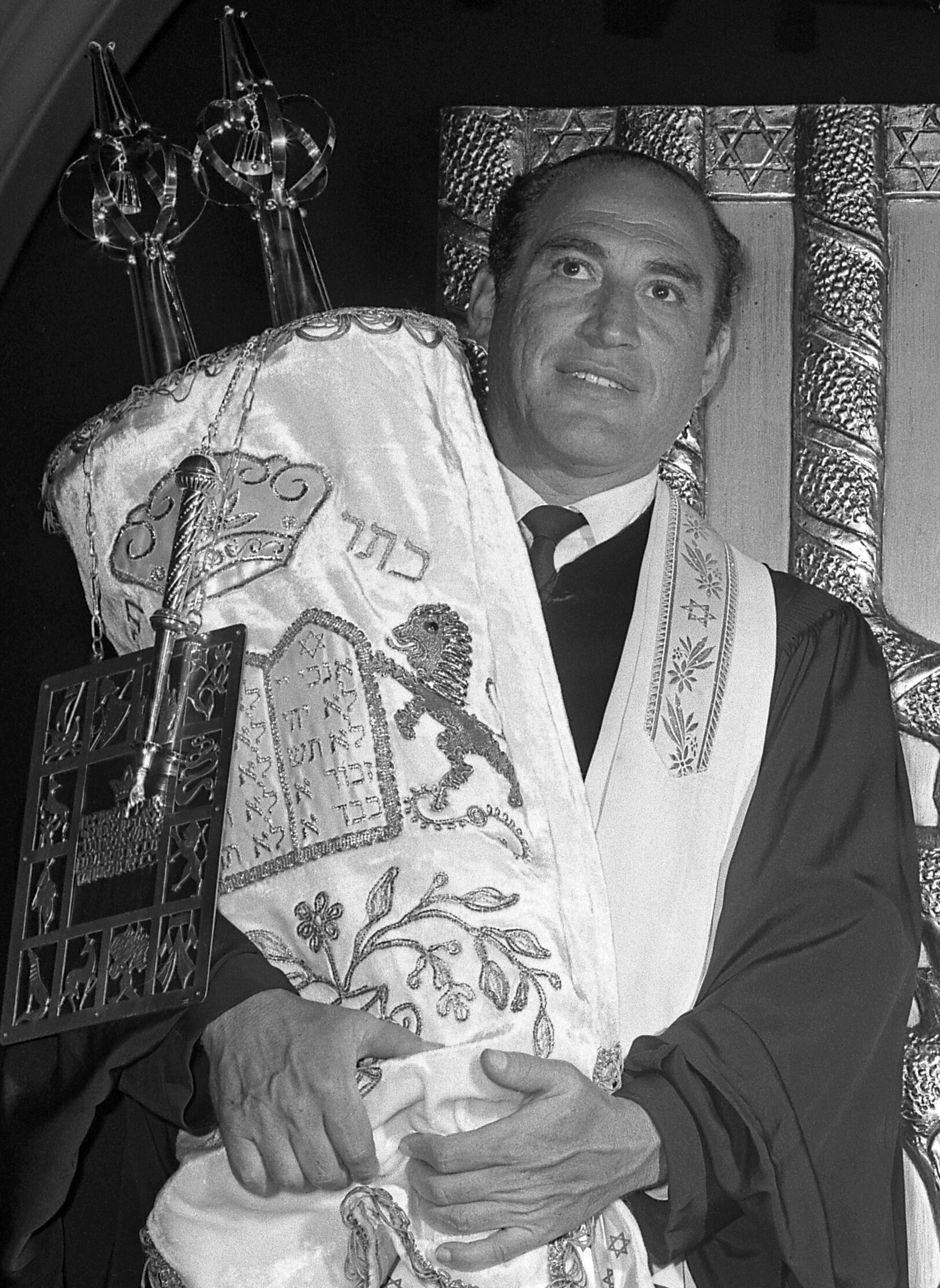
- Zeldin in 1964
- Born: July 11, 1920; Brooklyn, New York City, US
- Died: January 26, 2018 (aged 97); Palm Desert, California, US
- Resting place: Eden Memorial Park Cemetery
- Occupation: Rabbi
- Spouse: Florence Karp Zeldin (m. 1943–2012)
- Children: 2
- Relatives: Lee Zeldin (grandnephew)

Isaiah Zeldin (Hebrew: ישעיהו זלדין, romanized: Yeshayahu Zeldin, July 11, 1920 – January 26, 2018) was an American rabbi. He was the founder of the Stephen Wise Temple, a Reform synagogue in Bel Air, Los Angeles, California.

== Early years, family and education ==
He was born in Brooklyn, New York City, the second of three sons born to Movsha Froim "Morris" Zeldin, a pioneer in the Zionist movement and one of the organizers of the United Jewish Appeal of New York, and Esther née Shlyapochnik, both immigrants from Petrikov (in what is now Belarus). Yiddish was his first language.

Isaiah Zeldin graduated from Brooklyn College in 1941 and worked for the Jewish Education Committee in New York City. He was ordained at Hebrew Union College in Cincinnati, Ohio, which awarded him its Simon Lazarus Prize for attaining highest academic standing in his graduating class.

== Career ==
Before he was ordained, he served as rabbi of Temple Israel in Stockton, California. He was appointed assistant rabbi at Temple B'nai Jeshurin, Newark, New Jersey and subsequently the first rabbi of Temple Beth Shalom in Flushing, New York, in June 1951. In 1953 he became director of the Southern California region of the Union of American Hebrew Congregations and Dean of the Los Angeles College of Jewish Studies. In 1958, he assumed the pulpit at Temple Emanuel upon the sudden death of Rabbi Bernard Harrison.

=== Forming new synagogue ===
In 1964 Zeldin and 35 families broke away from Temple Emanuel to establish a new synagogue in Westwood in Los Angeles. The new congregation was named for the influential Reform rabbi Stephen Samuel Wise, under whom Zeldin had studied. The new congregation faced immediate controversy as the Union for Reform Judaism (then called the Union of American Hebrew Congregations or UAHC) felt that some of its members had failed to honor existing commitments to Temple Emanuel, and the UAHC did not accept it for membership for the first five years of its existence. The new congregation was intended to have a membership limited in size to maintain intimacy between the rabbi and the member families, and it met at St. Alban's Episcopal Church in Westwood. A year later, the congregation acquired a site for a permanent home; the size limit policy was changed in 1969; and in 1970, Stephen Wise Temple absorbed the existing Westwood Temple, whose membership had been declining, in part due to disruption from the construction of the San Diego Freeway. As of 2010, the congregational database of the Union for Reform Judaism (as the UAHC is now known) stated that Stephen S. Wise Temple had 2,886 members, which was more than any other congregation in the database. The database in 2020 stated the synagogue had 1700 membership families and stated in 2026 it had 1570 membership families.

=== Later years ===
In 1990, Zeldin retired from his duties as Senior Rabbi and was succeeded by Eli Herscher. In 1999, Rabbi Zeldin delivered a prayer at the inauguration of California Gov. Gray Davis.

== Personal life and demise ==
Zeldin died in 2018 at age 97.

== Books ==
- Zeldin, Isaiah (1946). The Mumar in the Talmud and Medieval Rabbinic Literature. Hebrew Union College - Jewish Institute of Religion.
- Zeldin, Isaiah (1961). Sources of Faith in Times of Crisis as Reflected in Talmudic Literature. Department of Adult Jewish Education, Union of American Hebrew Congregations.
- Zeldin, Isaiah (1996). What this modern Jew believes. Isaac Nathan Publishing Co.
- Zeldin, Isaiah (2005). Zeldin's Way: Eighty-Five Stories for Eighty-Five Years. Isaac Nathan Publishing Co.
