= Meir Finkelstein =

Israel musical artist

Meir Finkelstein מאיר פינקלשטיין
- Born: Meir Finkelstein; 1951 (age 73–74); Israel
- Genres: Contemporary Jewish Liturgical Music
- Occupation: Hazzan
- Years active: 1969–present
- Website: meirmusic.com

Meir Finkelstein (Hebrew: מאיר פינקלשטיין; born 1951) is a cantor and composer of contemporary Jewish liturgical music. He has composed more than 200 settings for the liturgy, as well as scored numerous television programs, made-for-TV movies, and documentary films. His tunes are sung in many Conservative, Reform, and Reconstructionist congregations. He is considered one of the most popular contemporary Jewish liturgical composers in the United States.

== Early life ==
Finkelstein was born in Israel in 1951. His father, the late Zvi Finkelstein, accepted a cantorial position in London, England, and the family moved there in 1955.

Young Meir displayed outstanding musical talent at an early age. Together with his older brother, Aryeh, he was soon accompanying their father in concert and on radio and television. At age 14, Meir became the cantor for a small synagogue in Glasgow, Scotland, thereby becoming the youngest cantor in Europe. The Finkelsteins went on to record two albums of original Israeli and cantorial songs.

At age 18, Meir became the cantor for one of London's most prestigious congregations, Golders Green Synagogue. While working at this congregation, he graduated from the Royal College of Music with an ARCM degree in voice, composition and piano.

== Move to the USA ==
A few years later he moved to the United States to become the cantor at Beth Hillel Congregation of Wilmette, Illinois. In 1982 he was appointed cantor of Sinai Temple in Los Angeles, a congregation he served for eighteen years.

During his tenure with Sinai Temple, Finkelstein composed more than 100 settings for the liturgy while simultaneously enjoying a successful career as a Hollywood composer/arranger. He scored numerous television shows, including episodes of Dallas and Falcon's Crest, as well as many made-for-TV movies. He collaborated with Steven Spielberg, composing music for the Visual History Foundation's award-winning documentary, "Survivors of the Holocaust".

Finkelstein's next cantorial position was at Congregation Beth Tzedec of Toronto, where he worked for three years before moving to Congregation Shaarey Zedek in Southfield, Michigan. On 1 July 2013, he became the cantor at Congregation Beth Yeshurun in Houston, Texas.

Finkelstein also works as a producer and arranger, and has collaborated on many of his colleagues' albums. He was one of the "Three Cantors," along with Alberto Mizrahi and David Propis, performing in sold-out cantorial symphonic concerts in Houston, Texas in 1995 and 1996. He also lectures on the history of Jewish liturgy as a scholar-in-residence at synagogues in the United States.

== Musical style ==
According to Nick Strimple, Finkelstein's work is influenced both by his British musical training and American musical theater.

Finkelstein's contemporary Jewish music is sung in synagogues throughout the world. His song L'dor Vador (From Generation to Generation) is one of his most popular. In 1993 he composed a Jewish requiem for victims of terror, Nishmat Tzedek (Soul of Righteousness). In 1995 he premiered an oratorio, "Liberation: A Choral Symphony", commemorating the 50th anniversary of the liberation of the Nazi death camps, at the Dorothy Chandler Pavilion in Los Angeles. The performance featured the Los Angeles Philharmonic Orchestra, the Los Angeles Master Chorale, and soloists.

== Family ==
Finkelstein's wife, Monica, was a practicing attorney for ten years and now focuses on real estate development in Texas and South Florida. They have two children, Noah and Emily. Noah currently attends law school and Emily studies classical voice at conservatory. Finkelstein also has two grown children in Los Angeles, Nadia and Adam by his first wife, Leba Nemeth.

Cantor Meir Finkelstein is now at Temple Emanu-El of Palm Beach, living in Palm Beach Gardens.

== Compositions/Albums ==
https://web.archive.org/web/20160304053200/http://faujsa.fau.edu/jsa/collection_music.php?jsa_num=100447&queryWhere=jsa_num&queryValue=100447&select=&return=collection_album

== Bibliography ==
- Finkelstein, Meir; Frenkel, Chayim; Chicago, Judy (2003). Nishmat Tzedek. Kehillat Israel.
