= Friars Club of Beverly Hills =

Defunct private show business club

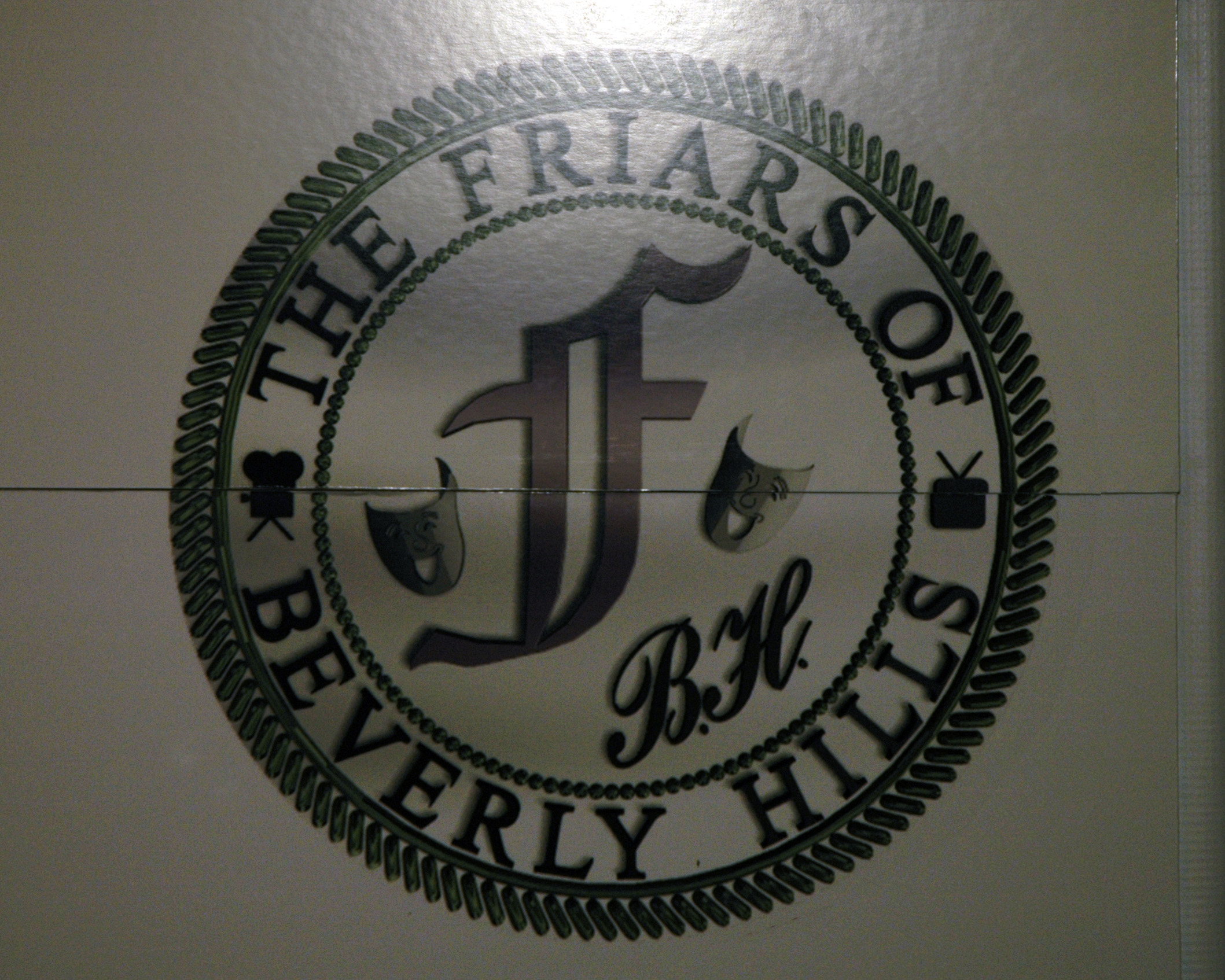
The Friars Club logo

The Friars Club of Beverly Hills (also known as the Friars Club of California) was a private show business club started in 1947 by comedian/actor Milton Berle, among other celebrities who had moved from New York. It was forced to change its name in 2007 after losing a lawsuit with the New York Friars' Club, and later closed. Its building, designed by modernist architect Sidney Eisenshtat, was demolished in 2011. The address was 9900 Santa Monica Blvd. Beverly Hills CA 90212

== History ==
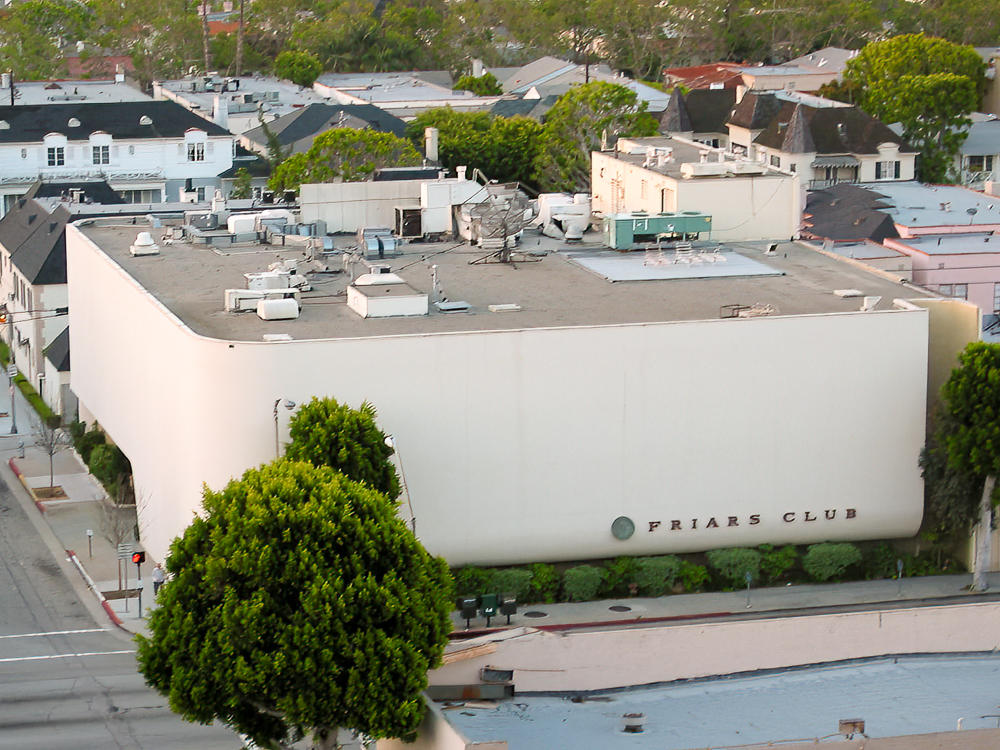
Friars Club of Beverly Hills building in 2003

The modern history of the club began in 1947, when Milton Berle got a group together at the old Savoy Hotel on Sunset Boulevard in Los Angeles, including actors Bing Crosby, Eddie Cantor, Jimmy Durante, George Jessel, Ronald Reagan, and Robert Taylor. The Friars Club of California was originally established as a spinoff from the New York Friars' Club as a non-profit, membership only club. In 1961, the California club moved into a distinctive, almost windowless building at 9900 South Santa Monica Boulevard in Beverly Hills designed by architect Sidney Eisenshtat.

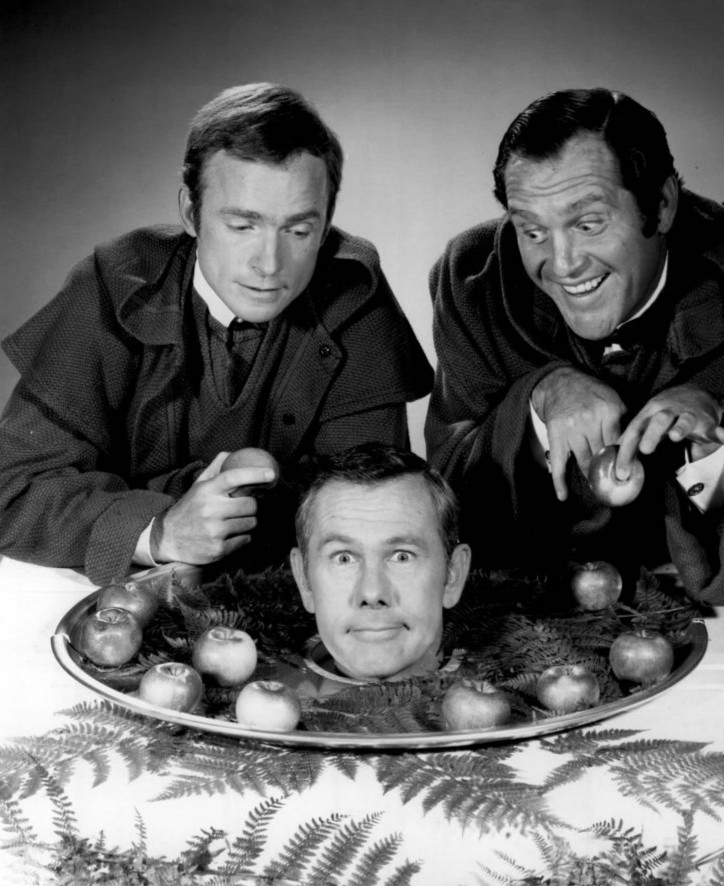
Publicity photo for the 1968 roast of Johnny Carson. Dick Cavett and Alan King are ready to start the honors.

Past members included Lucille Ball, Jack Benny, George Burns, Carol Burnett, Johnny Carson, Billy Crystal, Sammy Davis Jr., Judy Garland, Bob Hope, Al Jolson, Jerry Lewis, Dean Martin, Sid Caesar, Stan Lee, the Marx Brothers, and Frank Sinatra, Barbra Streisand, Elizabeth Taylor, among many others. Like the New York club, for many years the Friars Club of Beverly Hills was known for its celebrity members and "roasts".

From the summer of 1962 to the summer of 1966, John Roselli, Maurice Friedman, Manuel Jacobs, and others rigged high stake gin rummy games at the Friars Club. Over that period, the conspirators earned an estimated $2,000,000 in profits, and six defendants were ultimately convicted on various charges. In the wake of the resulting scandal, the Friars Club formed an ethics committee and removed some members, while others resigned.

In 1987, under court order, the club voted to admit women.

== Later years ==
In 1992, Irwin Schaeffer became president of the Friars Club of California. By 2004, after years of declining membership, the club's assets were sold to a for-profit corporation owned by Schaeffer's son, Darren Schaeffer. After the sale, the club was renamed "The Friars of Beverly Hills" and continued to operate under that name until 2007. However, in 2005, the New York Friars' Club commenced a lawsuit claiming trademark infringement under the Lanham Act, among other claims; in September 2007, the federal district court granted substantial portions of the New York Friars Club's motion for summary judgment, which effectively forced the California club to cease operations under the "Friars Club" name.

The California club changed its name to "Club 9900" for a few months, but as of June 2008, the club was closed, and its landmark building was listed as available for lease. In late January 2011, the building was demolished, despite objections from the Los Angeles Conservancy.

== See also ==
- Membership discrimination in California social clubs
