= Sidney Eisenshtat =

American architect (1914–2005)

- Born: June 6, 1914; New Haven, Connecticut
- Died: March 1, 2005 (aged 90); Los Angeles, California
- Occupation: Architect
- Buildings: Sinai Temple, Los Angeles, California Temple Mount Sinai, El Paso, Texas House of the Book, Simi Valley, California
- Projects: Master Plan for the University of Judaism, Los Angeles, California

Sidney Eisenshtat (June 6, 1914 – March 1, 2005) was an American architect who was best known for his synagogues and Jewish academic buildings.

== Biography ==
Sidney Eisenshtat was born in New Haven, Connecticut, and his family later lived in Detroit, Michigan. The family moved to Los Angeles, California in 1926, reportedly in search of a less anti-Semitic atmosphere than they perceived in Detroit. He graduated from the University of Southern California architecture school in 1935.

=== Works ===
Early in his career he designed large projects for the United States Department of Defense, tract houses, and retail stores.

It was not until 1951 that he designed his first major religious structure, Temple Emanuel of Beverly Hills, California. In 1954 Eisenshtat designed the Westside Jewish Community Center known today as Jewish Los Angeles, which at the time was called "the most magnificent JCC west of the Mississippi." Five years later he designed the landmark Sinai Temple on Wilshire Boulevard in the Westwood district of Los Angeles, a building that has been compared to the work of Frank Lloyd Wright and which is distinguished by its use of stained glass windows.

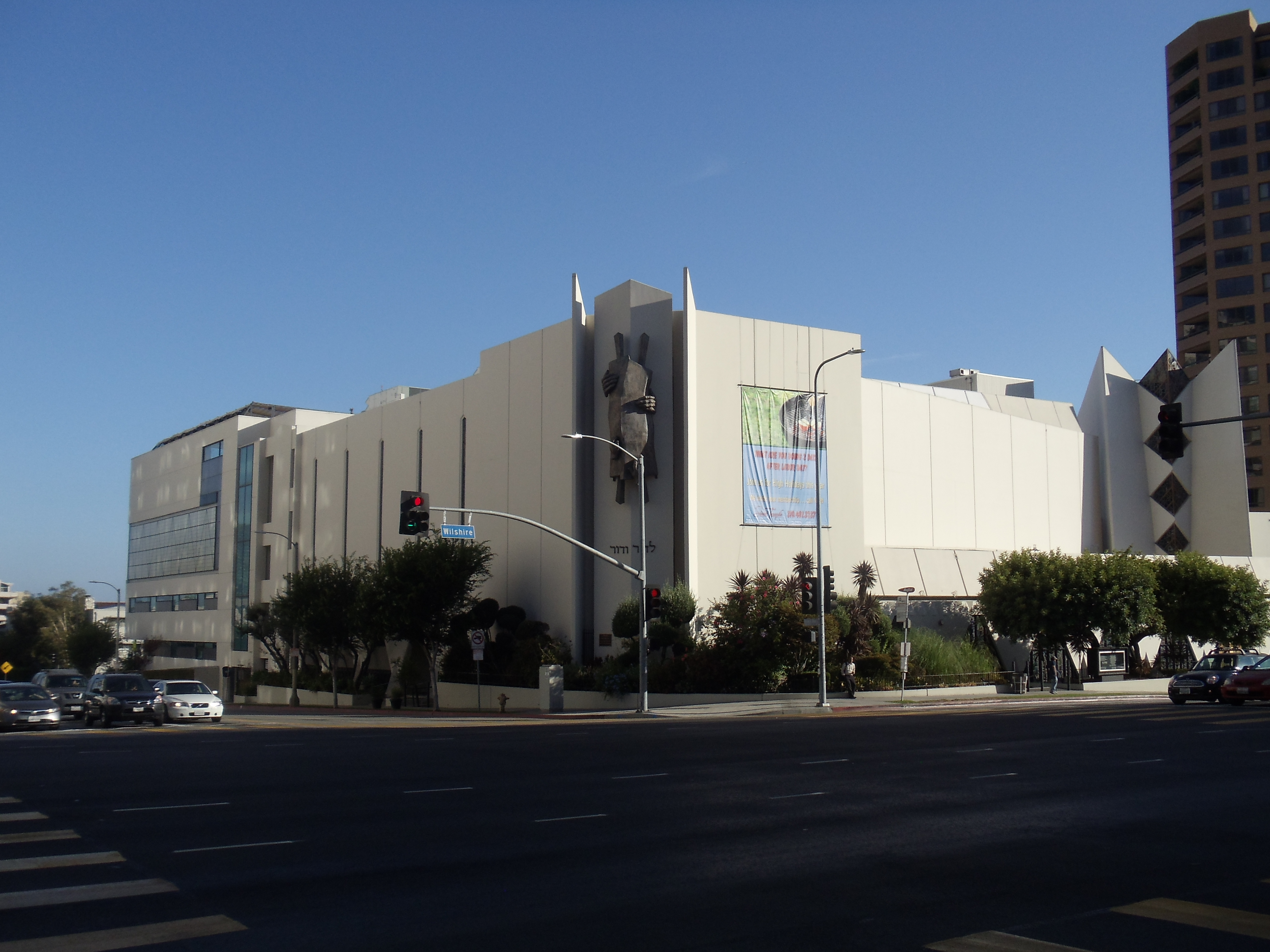
The Sinai Temple in Westwood, Los Angeles, California.

Eisenshtat said that his concept of synagogue design was based on his perception that, unlike in some religions, "in Judaism there is no intermediary. Therefore, I see the structure for synagogues not as pyramidal but as horizontal." Influenced by other modernist architects, notably Erich Mendelsohn, Eisenshat was noted for a use of expressive forms in thin shell concrete, white walls, simple materials, and natural light. Two of his most representative and distinguished buildings are set in arid desert environments.

At Temple Mount Sinai in El Paso, Texas (1962) the Ark is a giant open tripod inside a soaring, tent-like concrete sanctuary; one writer has commented that this building "with its soaring arched shell seems to spring out of the rocky Texas soil" and gives the congregants a view of the mountains "through the high glazed arch behind the Ark." This building is also featured in the book American Synagogues by noted architecture critic Samuel D. Gruber, where it is described as "a dramatically sculptural building perfect for its austere setting."

The Futurist and Brutalist style concrete House of the Book, built in the early 1970s as the synagogue for the Brandeis-Bardin Institute, is located in the Simi Hills near Simi Valley, California. It has been used as a filming location for science-fiction and other productions, notably including Star Trek VI: The Undiscovered Country, as well as the Command Center for the first few seasons of the American Power Rangers television show.

Eisenshtat's design for the Hillel House at the University of Southern California was described as one of his best buildings by USC architecture professor James Steele, who said it was representative of "his personality and his attitude toward Judaism," with a building that is "very open, free, full of light," but surrounded by a "bunker"-like "defensive wall."

Eisenshtat also designed the master plan for the campus of the University of Judaism (now American Jewish University) in Bel-Air, Los Angeles, California, completed in 1977.

His notable secular buildings include the Friars Club and Union Bank buildings in Beverly Hills and the Sven Lokrantz School for disabled children in Reseda.

For many years during the 1950s, 1960s, and 1970s, Eisenshtat's lead designer was Maxwell Rex Raymer (June 4, 1922 – February 27, 2010).

=== Legacy ===
An observant Orthodox Jew, Eisenshtat reportedly did not accept fees for his synagogue projects. He was honored as a Fellow of the American Institute of Architects in 1986. He died in 2005 at age 90.

His papers are collected at USC's architecture library. In 2012, USC's Architectural Guild Press published a monograph about Eisenshtat's work, edited by USC professor James Steele.

== Selected buildings ==
- Temple Emanuel, Beverly Hills, California (1951, opened 1953, remodeled 2011 by Rios Clementi Hale Studios)
- Sinai Temple, Westwood, Los Angeles, California (1960)
- Friars Club of Beverly Hills, Beverly Hills, California (1961) (demolished 2011)
- Temple Mount Sinai, El Paso, Texas (1962)
- House of the Book, Brandeis-Bardin Institute, Simi Valley, California (c. 1970)
- Hillel House, University of Southern California, Los Angeles, California
- Knox Presbyterian Church, Los Angeles, California
