= Sherre Hirsch =

American rabbi

Sherre Hirsch received her Rabbinic ordination and Master's degree from the Jewish Theological Seminary in New York City. She also received a Master's degree in Hebrew Letters from the University of Judaism (now the American Jewish University) in California, as well as a BA from Northwestern University. She served as a rabbi at Sinai Temple in Los Angeles from 1998 to 2006. Currently, she works as the Spiritual Life Consultant at Canyon Ranch.

Hirsch has recently ventured into electronic media to engage in discussions on spirituality – including serving as a Spiritual Commentator for the Today show, relationship advisor for The Tyra Banks Show, conversing on interfaith issues on Naomi Judd’s weekly New Morning show on the Hallmark Channel, and as a featured guest on Thirty Good Minutes on PBS. She was also a contributor for Momlogic.com. In addition to authoring many articles, Hirsch published her first book, We Plan, God Laughs: What to do When Life Hits You Over the Head in April 2008 (Doubleday). Her second book Thresholds: How to Thrive Through Life's Transitions arrived in bookstores in August 2015 (Random House).

She lives in Los Angeles with her husband and four children.

== Books ==
- We Plan, God Laughs: 10 Steps to Finding Your Divine Plan When Life is Not Turning Out Like You Wanted, Doubleday, 2008. ISBN 978-0-385-52361-5
- Thresholds: How to Thrive Through Life's Transitions, Random House, 2015. ISBN 978-0-307-59083-1
