= Citizens Campaign for the Environment =

Nonprofit organization in northeastern United States

- Abbreviation: CCE
- Formation: 1985
- Type: 501(c)(4) nonprofit organization
- Purpose: Environmental advocacy and public policy
- Headquarters: Farmingdale, New York, U.S.
- Region served: New York and Connecticut
- Members: 120,000

Citizens Campaign for the Environment (CCE) was founded in 1985 by a small group of Long Island citizens. CCE is as a not-for-profit organization. Its offices can be found in Farmingdale, White Plains, Albany, Syracuse and Buffalo in New York and in Hamden, Connecticut. CCE has 120,000 members and is a non-partisan environmental advocacy organization classified as a 501(c)4 non-profit organization.

CCE advocates for local, state and federal environmental policy. One of its goals is to help citizens increase their political influence and participation in important environmental campaigns and issues, particularly across New York State and Connecticut. CCE is best known regionally for its work on the Long Island Sound and Great Lakes protection. CCE works in five main campaign areas: water protection; public health, toxins and recycling; open space and wildlife habitat; climate change and energy policy; and legislative campaigns.

CCE's mission states, "Citizens Campaign for the Environment (CCE) works to build widespread citizen understanding and advocacy for policies and actions designed to manage and protect our natural resources and public health."

== Projects and accomplishments ==
=== Water protection ===
==== Long Island Sound ====
CCE works to protect and restore the Long Island Sound, an Estuary of National Significance, which has been vulnerable to pollution, habitat destruction and invasive species. Due to the CCE's dedication, there has been a significant reduction in nitrogen levels and protection of critical habitat in New York and Connecticut.

The Total Maximum Daily Load plan (TMDL) was created by the states of New York and Connecticut, as well as the EPA. The TMDL adopted a nitrogen reduction target of 58.5% by 2017 from early 1990s baseline levels. In 2016, both the New York and Connecticut nitrogen loads were below the Waste Load Allocations permitted by the TMDL for the first time, thus achieving this major goal. As a result there has been a significant reduction of the hypoxic area in Long Island Sound.

In addition, 1,045 acres (423 ha) of ecologically important habitat have been restored and 158 miles (254 km) of fish passage have been created.

==== Great Lakes ====
CCE is a member of the Healing Our Waters - Great Lakes Coalition, whose goal is to restore and protect the Great Lakes with a sustainable restoration plan and federal funding to implement it. CCE continues to advocate that Congress provide robust funding to ensure that the GLRI Action Plan III - developed by federal agencies - reaches its goals so that the Great Lakes are protected and restored.

The Great Lakes-St. Lawrence River Basin Water Resources Compact has been law in New York and the United States since 2008. CCE is now working to ensure that the Compact is implemented effectively in New York.

Highlights of the Compact include:

- Sets environmental standards for managing new or increased water withdrawal proposals
- Prohibits water diversions out of the basin, with limited exceptions
- Establishes protection for all the waters of the Great Lakes Basin, including tributary streams, rivers and groundwater
- Requires states to establish water conservation measures
- Ensures public participation opportunities
- Preserves the rights of states to enact stronger protections.

==== Drinking water protection ====
CCE works to protect the drinking water for all New York and Connecticut residents, from its source all the way to the tap. A main threat to safe drinking water that concerns the CCE is 1,4-Dioxane, a hidden carcinogen in everyday products. When the CCE independently tested 80 household products such as shampoos, baby products, laundry detergents and soaps, 65 out of 80 products contained 1,4-dioxane. 1,4-Dioxane is a possible human carcinogen, according to the EPA. Sewage and septic systems are not designed to filter out this contaminant, making water resources very susceptible to contamination. Although manufacturers can easily remove 1,4-dioxane from products, many do not despite FDA recommendations. CCE is working to establish strong, health-based drinking water standards for 1,4-dioxane, as well as banning the dangerous chemical from consumer products.

Due to efforts of groups including CCE, Governor Andrew Cuomo signed a bill into law in 2019 that prohibits the sale of products containing 1,4-dioxane (down to trace amounts) in New York State, effective December 31, 2022.
