= Camp Ramah in California =

Jewish summer camp in Ojai, California

Coordinates: 34°27′42.80″N 119°15′58.04″W

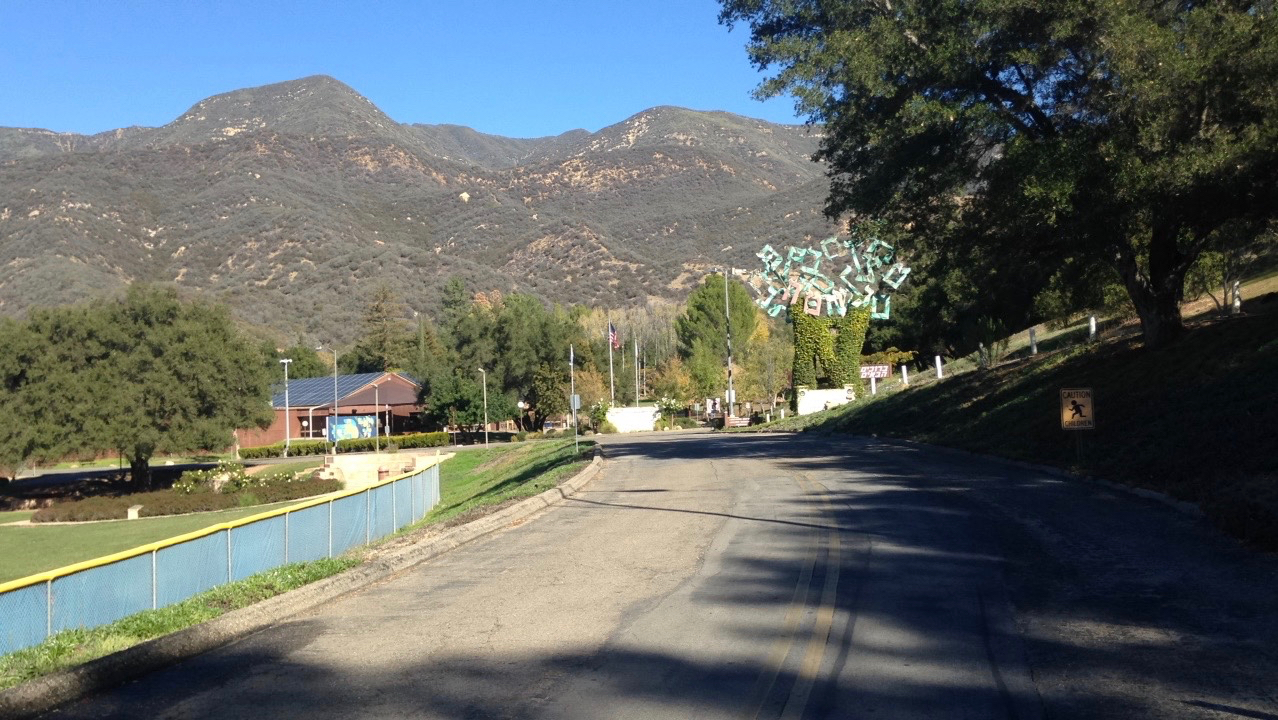
Entrance to Camp Ramah in California, located on 385 Fairview Rd. in Ojai, California.

Camp Ramah in California is a Jewish summer camp located in Ojai, California. The camp is affiliated with the Conservative Movement and observes the laws of Judaism, Shabbat, and the laws of Kashrut.

== History ==
The camp was founded in 1956 by Rabbi Jacob Pressman. In 2007, the camp installed the largest private non-profit solar power generator system in the state of California, a 270 kW system. Population-wise, it is the largest of the Ramah summer camps, and it caters to the communities of the west coasts of the United States, Canada, Mexico, as well as the non-contiguous states of Hawaii and Alaska. It has also hosted campers from the United Kingdom. It is one of the only Ramah camps that operates a winter camp and holds winter weekends owing to the favorable winter climate. The summer season is split up into two four-week sessions attended by over 1,350 campers. Prayers are held in a synagogue in the round.

== Administration ==
The current executive director is Rabbi Joe Menashe. He follows Rabbi Daniel Greyber, Brian Greene and Rabbi Edward Feinstein.

Chaim Potok, author of The Chosen, The Promise, and My Name is Asher Lev, was director of the camp in 1957-59 before embarking on his career as a writer. Brian Greene and Rabbi Daniel Greyber have been executive directors of the camp.

Following Chaim Potok, the camp was led by Tzvili Yardeni, Dr. Walter Ackerman, Rabbi Zvi Dershowitz, Rabbi Ronald Levine, Rabbi Stuart Kelman and then Asher Meltzer.

Rabbi Zvi Dershowitz directed the winter camp program and was the administrative director during the summer program from 1963 until 1973 (during which Dr. Walter Ackerman was the director of the summer camping program). Rabbi Dershowitz helped to start the winter weekends and helped to create what is now the current campus on 385 Fairview Road.

== Divisions ==
The campers are split up into age groups, called Edot (Plural) or "Edah" (Singular):

- Gesher ("bridge") is a special 2-week program for younger campers entering 3rd to 5th grade who want to be acclimated to camp-life in shorter sessions.
- Nitzanim ("sprouts"), entering 4th and 5th grade
- Giborei Yisrael ("heroes of Israel"), entering 6th grade
- Adat Shalom ("the tribe of peace"), entering 7th grade
- Sollelim ("trail blazers"), entering 8th grade
- Tzophim ("scouts"), entering 9th grade
- Kochavim ("stars") entering 10th grade
- Machon ("foundation") entering 11th grade
- Amitzim ("the strong ones") is an edah for special needs children of camp-age.
- Abirim ("knights") entering 5th grade when Nitzanim is too large to be one edah

Machon is the oldest age group for campers. The following summer, former campers (or "Ramahniks") are eligible for a six-week tour of Israel called the Ramah Seminar. Mador is a program for first-time counselors and Madrega is a program for first-time specialists, those entering 12th grade.

For special-needs adults, there is a program known as "Ezra" ("help"), for them to be on staff in preparation for careers.

The "Tzevet" ("staff") is divided into "Madrichim" (counselors) and "Moomchim ("specialists"), while each Edah is led by a "Rosh Edah" ("head of the age group").

== Special programs ==
The camp holds a family Memorial Day weekend, as well as a week-long program in August for families with children with special needs.

In addition, Camp Ramah is rented out by Rotary clubs in order to host RYLA, a student leadership camp. The event lasts about four days and invites students from all over California.

== Notable staff and alumni ==
- Ben Platt attended as a camper and counselor and starred in camp musicals.
- Max Bemis of the band "Say Anything".

== See also ==
- Camp Ramah
- American Jewish University
- Zvi Dershowitz
- Joel Grover
- David Lieber
