= Temple Emanuel (Beverly Hills, California) =

Reform Judaism synagogue in Beverly Hills, California, US

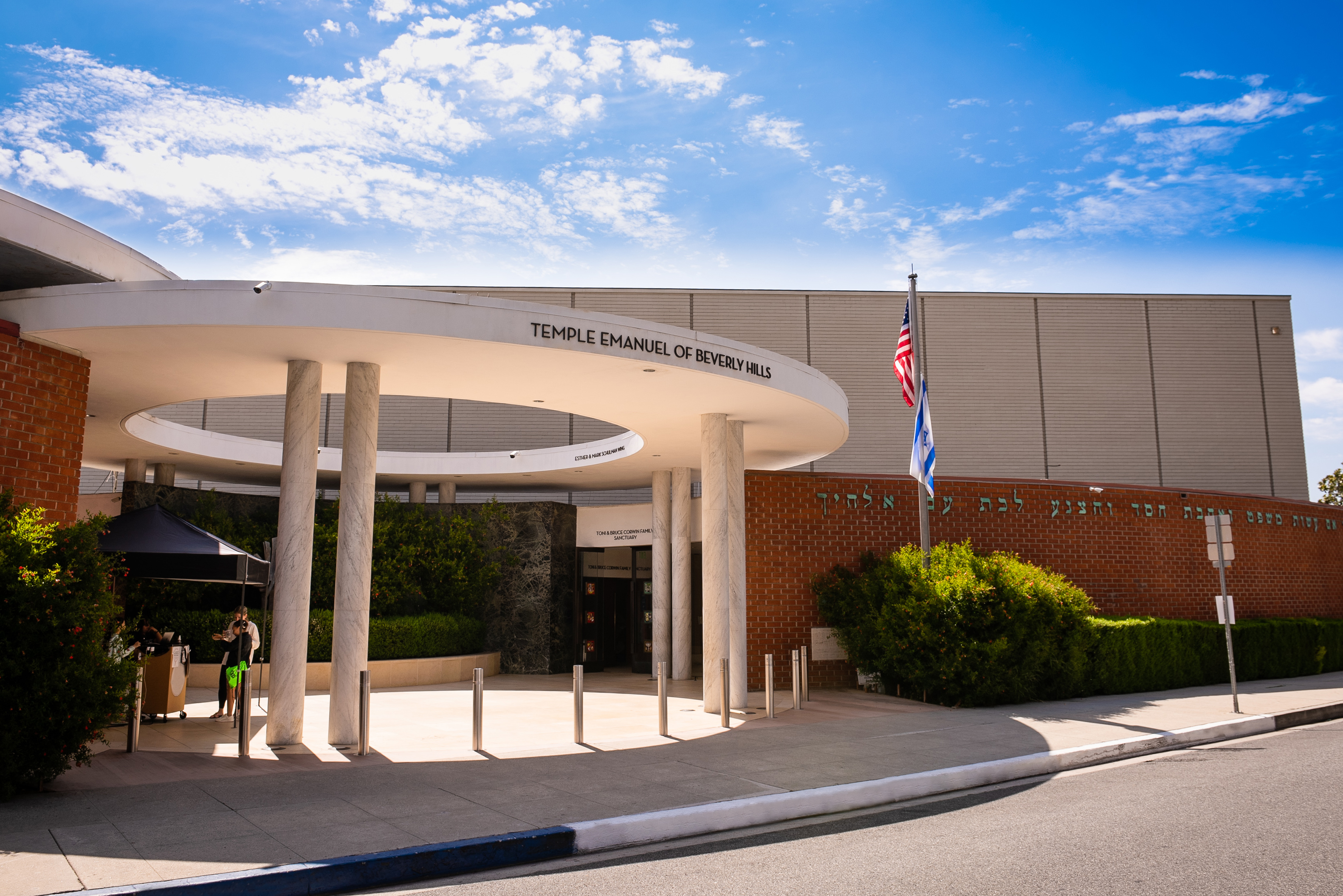
- The synagogue building, in 2019

- Location in Los Angeles, California

Religion
- Affiliation: Reform Judaism
- Ecclesiastical or organisational status: Synagogue
- Status: Active

Location
- Location: 300 North Clark Drive, Beverly Hills, California
- Country: United States
- Coordinates: 34°04′18″N 118°23′06″W

Architecture
- Architect: Sidney Eisenshtat
- Type: Synagogue architecture
- Style: Modernist
- Established: 1938 (as a congregation)
- Completed: 1953

Website
- tebh.org

Temple Emanuel is a Reform Jewish congregation and synagogue, located at 300 North Clark Drive, in Beverly Hills, California, in the United States.

== History ==
=== 1938 until 1990s ===
The congregation was founded in 1938. The first rabbi, Ernest Trattner, served until 1947.

The current building, completed in 1953, was the first religious building designed by architect Sidney Eisenshtat, who went on to become a noted designer of synagogues and Jewish academic buildings. Built with red brick and concrete, it is considered an important example of Modernist synagogue architecture.

Inside, the Belle Chapel presents a permanent memorial to the victims of the Holocaust. The sculpture inside the chapel was designed by Dr Eric May and donated by Nicolai Joffe.

Isaiah Zeldin served as one of its rabbis from 1958 until 1964, when he left to found Stephen S. Wise Temple in Bel Air in 1964. Rabbi Zeldin was preceded by Bernard Harrison; after Rabbi Harrison's death, a chapel was dedicated in his honor. Edward Krawll was cantor for many years. Meanwhile, comedian Groucho Marx was a congregant.

By 1993, the synagogue faced financial challenges but successfully stabilized its finances through donations and a capital campaign, which eventually raised approximately $10 million. The building underwent a substantial renovation in 2011, under the supervision of Rios Clementi Hale Studios.

=== Since 1994 ===
From 1994 to 2015, Laura Geller had served as senior rabbi. This made her the first female rabbi to lead a major metropolitan congregation. Rabbi Jonathan Aaron has served as senior rabbi since 2015. The clergy team who work alongside Rabbi Aaron are Cantor Lizzie Weiss (senior cantor) and Rabbi Liora Alban (associate rabbi).

In 2019, the school and community building, located across the street, was sold to a developer; and, in 2021, they were demolished to make way for a residential apartment project.
