= Sinai Temple (Los Angeles) =

Conservative Jewish congregation and synagogue

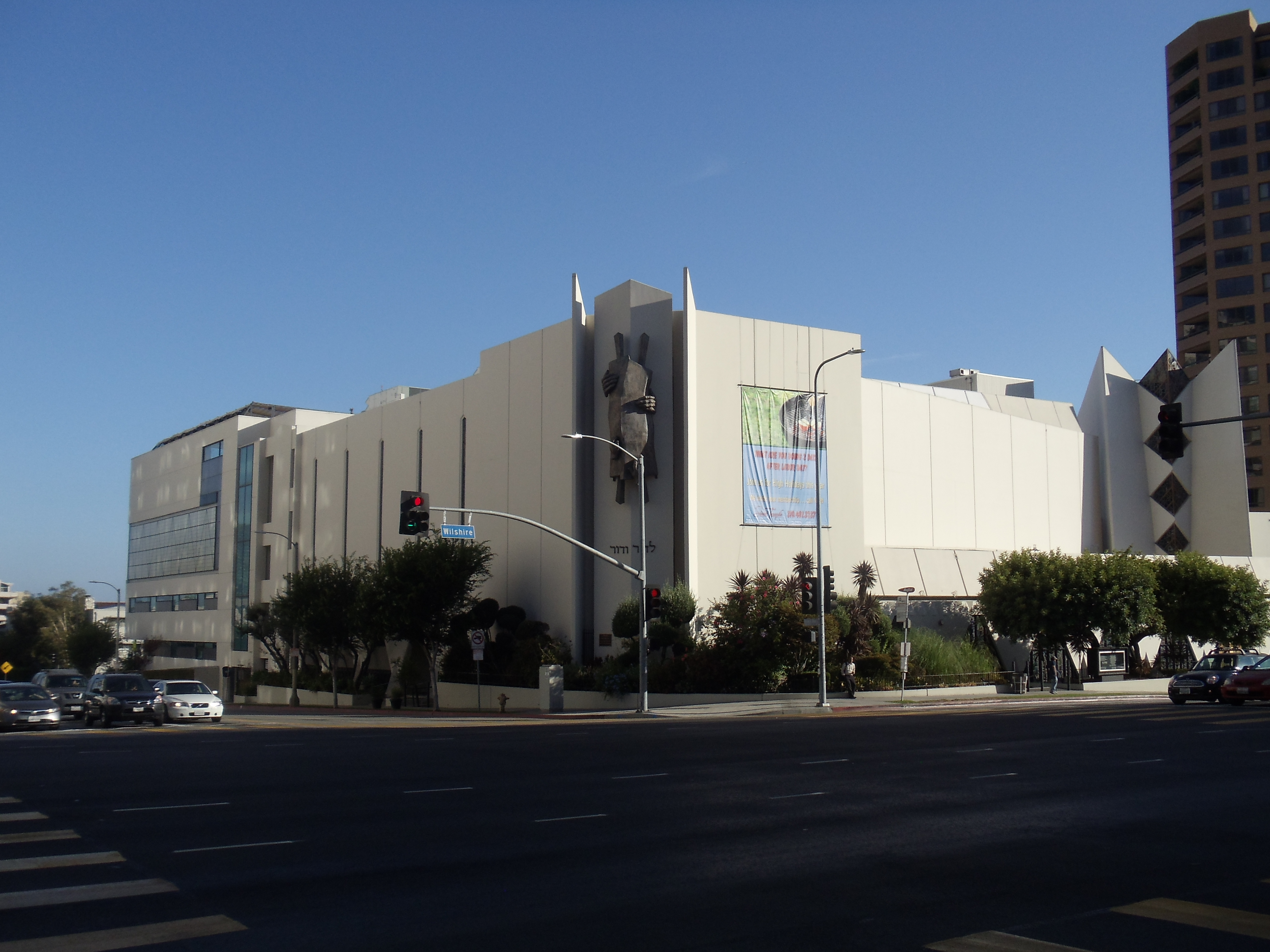
- Sinai Temple, in Westwood, Los Angeles

- Location in Los Angeles

Religion
- Affiliation: Conservative Judaism
- Rite: Ashkenazic
- Ecclesiastical or organizational status: Synagogue
- Leadership: Rabbi Nicole Guzik; Rabbi Erez Sherman; Cantor Marcus Feldman (Cantor); Rabbi David Wolpe (Emeritus)
- Status: Active

Location
- Location: 10400 Wilshire Boulevard, Westwood, Los Angeles, California 90024
- Country: United States
- Interactive map of Sinai Temple
- Coordinates: 34°03′59″N 118°25′45″W

Architecture
- Architects: Sidney Eisenshtat (1956); Mehrdad Yazdani and Dworsky Associates (1998)
- Type: Synagogue
- Style: Modernist
- Established: 1906 (as a congregation)
- Completed: 1956; 1998

Website
- sinaitemple.org

The Sinai Temple is a Conservative synagogue located at 10400 Wilshire Boulevard, Westwood, Los Angeles, California, in the United States. Sinai Temple is the oldest and largest Conservative congregation in the greater Los Angeles area.

Architect Sidney Eisenshtat designed the current synagogue building, constructed in 1956 and expanded in 1998. Since June 2023, the co-senior rabbis are Rabbi Nicole Guzik and Rabbi Erez Sherman, and the Rabbi Emeritus is David Wolpe. The current Head of School at Sinai Akiba Academy, the affiliated Educational Institution is Dr. Lauren Plant.

== History ==
Begun in 1906, Sinai Temple was established as the first Conservative congregation in Southern California. Its founders saw it as a venue for the practice of traditional Judaism in an environment of assimilation. The congregation first met in a B'nai B'rith hall on Figueroa Street in downtown Los Angeles, then from 1909 to 1925 in a building at 12th and Valencia, just west of what is now the Los Angeles Convention Center. That building then became the Welsh Presbyterian Church, and was named a Los Angeles Historic-Cultural Monument in 1977. In 2013, Jewish music impresario Craig Taubman bought the building and announced plans to convert it into "a multicultural and interfaith performing arts center and house of worship."

Having outgrown this facility, the congregation relocated to the mid-Wilshire district in 1925. This second building, located at 4th and New Hampshire, is now a Korean Presbyterian church.

Following the trend of its congregants, who were moving in significant numbers to Beverly Hills and the Westside of Los Angeles, in 1960, Sinai Temple constructed its third facility at its current location at the corner of Wilshire Boulevard and Beverly Glen Boulevard in Westwood. The building has a striking interior marked by the use of stained glass; Eisenshtat's design has been compared to the work of Frank Lloyd Wright. The building was expanded in 1998, under the supervision of architect Mehrdad Yazdani and Dworsky Associates.

In 1986, Akiba Academy, which had rented facilities for its kindergarten through eighth grade program at Sinai Temple since its inception in 1968, merged with Sinai Temple and became known as Sinai Akiba Academy. The school is affiliated with the Solomon Schechter Day School Association and is the longest-accredited Jewish day school in the California Association of Independent School. Now merged with the Early Childhood Center, it runs Preschool-8th grade.

Sinai Temple owns and operates Mount Sinai Memorial Parks and Mortuaries, a large Jewish cemetery in the Hollywood Hills, which the temple acquired in 1967 from the neighboring Forest Lawn Memorial Park. In 1997 Mount Sinai dedicated a second cemetery location in Simi Valley.

== Notable people and events ==
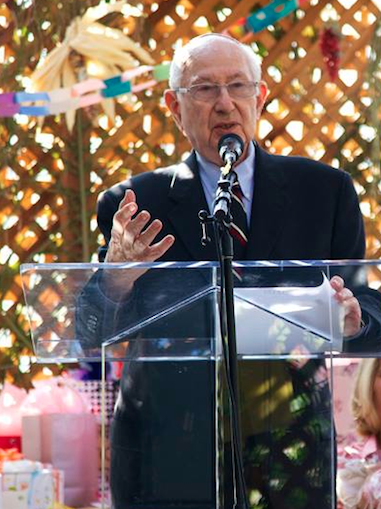
Rabbi Zvi Dershowitz delivers a speech at a baby-naming ceremony at Sinai Temple in 2014.

David Wolpe, Sinai Temple's former senior rabbi, is an author and leader of the Conservative movement. In 2008, a Newsweek article named him the most influential pulpit rabbi in the United States. Other notable clergy of Sinai Temple have included Rabbi David Lieber, who later headed the University of Judaism; cantor and composer Meir Finkelstein; Rabbi Sherre Hirsch, and emeritus Rabbi Zvi Dershowitz.

Rabbi Laurence Scheindlin, former headmaster of Sinai Akiba Academy, came to the school in 1977, when it had 170 students. As of 2010 the school had 560 students. He has published a number of articles on emotions and spiritual education. In 2009 Rabbi Scheindlin became the first school head to be elected president of the Solomon Schechter Day School Association, the national association of day schools that identify with Conservative Judaism.

"Friday Night Live", a lively, music-driven Shabbat service intended to attract younger congregants, was initially developed by Rabbi Wolpe and musician Craig Taubman at Sinai Temple; the concept is now replicated in other synagogues around the world. In June 2006, a Friday Night Live service at Sinai Temple saw an appearance by evangelical Christian minister and author Rick Warren, Warren's first appearance as featured speaker in a synagogue.

Sinai Temple has been notably impacted by the wave of Persian Jews who immigrated to the United States after the 1979 Islamic Revolution in Iran. Prior to this event, the congregation had been overwhelmingly composed of Ashkenazi Jews of Eastern European heritage. As many Persian Jews emigrated to Los Angeles, a substantial number joined Sinai Temple; over time the Persian Jews became more fully integrated into the congregation, which is now made up of about even proportions of Ashkenazim and Persians. Jimmy Delshad became the first Persian Jew to become president of Sinai Temple in 1990; in 2007 he was elected as mayor of Beverly Hills.

In 1999, Sinai Temple was the site of a "second bar mitzvah" for actor Kirk Douglas, then age 83. Also in 1999, the 14th Dalai Lama spoke to an overflow audience as part of the World Festival of Sacred Music.

== In popular culture ==
Sinai Temple was a filming location for the 2024 Netflix romantic comedy TV series Nobody Wants This, in which it doubled for the synagogue where main character Noah Roklov (Adam Brody) serves as a rabbi.

Sinai Temple is mentioned in dialogue during the 2024 movie Thelma, starring June Squibb in the title role. When Thelma is trying to place how she knows another older lady she meets at a gas station, the other woman asks, "did you go to Sinai?" and Thelma replies, "no, we were at Beth Am."
