= Student Success Act =

- Long title: To support State and local accountability for public education, protect State and local authority, inform parents of the performance of their children’s schools, and for other purposes.
- Announced in: the 113th United States Congress
- Sponsored by: Rep. John Kline (R, MN-2)
- Number of co-sponsors: 11

Codification
- Acts affected: Elementary and Secondary Education Act of 1965, McKinney-Vento Homeless Assistance Act, Individuals with Disabilities Education Act, General Education Provisions Act, and others
- U.S.C. sections affected: 20 U.S.C. § 6301 et seq., 20 U.S.C. § 7701 et seq., 20 U.S.C. § 6311 et seq., 42 U.S.C. § 11431, 42 U.S.C. § 5701 et seq., and others
- Agencies affected: United States Congress, Executive Office of the President, Office of Management and Budget, United States Department of Commerce, United States Department of the Interior, Bureau of Indian Affairs, Department of Health and Human Services, Department of Housing and Urban Development, United States Department of Education, National Center for Education Statistics, United States Department of Defense
- Authorizations of appropriations: $22,854,120,000

Legislative history
- Introduced in the House as H.R. 5 by Rep. John Kline (R, MN-2) on June 6, 2013; Committee consideration by United States House Committee on Education and the Workforce, United States House Committee on Financial Services; Passed the House on July 19, 2013 (Roll Call 374: 221-207)

The Student Success Act (H.R. 5) is a bill that was introduced into the United States House of Representatives during the 113th Congress. The bill deals with education policy and would alter parts of both the Elementary and Secondary Education Act and the No Child Left Behind Act. The Student Success Act passed in a House vote of 221–207 on July 19, 2013.

== Background ==
The No Child Left Behind Act of 2001 had specific requirements for schools to pass increasingly high standards on state tests. The Obama administration waived some of the requirements of the NCLB. Republicans argued that waivers are only a temporary fix, thus the necessity of a reform bill. They also criticized these waivers, arguing that the Obama administration was using them to control the states. It was sponsored by House Education and the Workforce Committee Chairman John Kline (R-Minn.) and Subcommittee on Early Childhood, Elementary and Secondary Education Chairman Todd Rokita (R-Ind.).

== Provisions of the bill ==
The Student Success Act would "end more than 70 federal education programs and the federal government's metrics for measuring school performance."

- The bill gives individual states more control over their own education systems.
- The bill promotes charter schools.
- An amendment to the bill, adopted on July 18, 2013, by a vote of 239–187, would forbid the federal government from imposing additional requirements on the states unless those requirements are specifically authorized by law.
- Elimination of federal mandated actions and interventions currently required of poor performing schools.
- Allow Title I schools to receive funds to promote the academic achievement of students in need.
- The bill waives State rights for any state approving the grant program. The state must comply with any requirement.

This nullifies school board and parental rights as well.

== Procedural history ==
=== House ===
The Student Success Act was introduced into the House of Representatives on June 6, 2013, by Rep. John Kline (R-MN). It was referred to both the United States House Committee on Education and the Workforce and the United States House Committee on Financial Services. On June 19, 2013, the House Committee on Education and the Workforce ordered the bill to be reported (amended) by a vote of 23–16. Both committees discharged the bill on July 11, 2013, and it was placed on the Union Calendar, Calendar No. 108.

A rule about the bill from the United States House Committee on Rules allows 26 different amendments to be discussed – 15 are from Republicans, seven are from Democrats, and the remaining four are considered to be bipartisan. The House passed this bill 230–190, with only three Democrats voting in favor of the rule.

On July 19, 2013, the House voted to pass the Student Success Act in Roll Call 374 221–207. All of the Democrats and 12 of the Republicans voted against the bill.

==== House Report 113-150 part 1 ====
The Student Success Act was reported on July 11, 2013, alongside House Report 113-150 pt 1. This 973 page long report contains the full text of the bill (the first 133 pages), followed by information about the purpose of the bill, a history of committee hearings on the subject (dating back to September 2003), information about amendments that were adopted, and so forth. According to the report, the purpose of the bill is: "H.R. 5, the Student Success Act, amends the Elementary and Secondary Education Act of 1965 to support state and local accountability for public education, provide important information to parents on their schools’ and students’ performance, enhance local flexibility, protect taxpayers’ investments in education, strengthen state and local autonomy, support more effective teachers in the classroom, and provide state and local leaders with the freedom to direct federal resources to the programs that best serve their student populations. The Student Success Act reflects the four principles for reform outlined by the Committee on Education and the Workforce: reducing the federal footprint, restoring local control, supporting effective teachers, and empowering parents." A summary of the bill is found from page 169 to page 1798.

=== Senate ===
The United States Senate was expected to ignore the bill, instead working on its own bill about education reform.

=== Presidential reaction ===
The White House said that President of the United States Barack Obama would veto the bill.

== Congressional Budget office report ==
This summary is primarily taken from a report published by the Congressional Budget Office on July 19, 2013, a public domain source.

H.R. 5 would amend and reauthorize the Elementary and Secondary Education Act of 1965 (the ESEA, commonly referred to, in its most recently reauthorized form, as No Child Left Behind). The underlying authorizations for those programs have expired, although most have received appropriations since their authorizations have expired. This bill would authorize funding through fiscal year 2019 for various grant programs; those authorizations would automatically be extended one year, through 2020, under the General Education Provisions Act. The bill also would amend and reauthorize the McKinney–Vento Homeless Assistance Act, which authorizes grants to assist in the education of homeless children.

CBO estimates that H.R. 5 would authorize the appropriation of $22.9 billion in 2014 and $114.3 billion over the 2014–2018 period. Implementing the bill would have discretionary costs of $85.6 billion over the 2014–2018 period, assuming appropriation of the estimated amounts.

== Debate and discussion ==
The Student Success Act was primarily supported by Republicans. The Republicans argued that the reduction of federal programs and government metrics are necessary to give the states more control over their own education systems. Republicans contended that state and local officials are in a better position than the federal government to decide what their students need. They also argued that parents would take better care of their children than bureaucrats from the United States Department of Education.

The Student Success Act did not receive very much support from Democrats. Although many Democrats concurred with Republicans that the No Child Left Behind Act needed to be reformed, they thought that the Student Success Act loosen the standards too much. Rep. Jared Polis (D-CO) argued against the bill, because if the Student Success Act becomes law, "state's wouldn't even be required to set performance targets based on student growth, proficiency or graduation rates... Effectively, it would allow states to define success down simply to make themselves of their districts look good. Some Democrats also argued against the bill because they feared it would give the states freedom to ignore students in special education, as well as those just starting to learn English.

The bill is opposed by some teachers unions because it promotes charter schools.

It is also opposed by some conservatives who fear that the bill will ultimately reduce parental control of their children's education and will impair religious freedom by giving states more control over private schools.

== See also ==
- List of bills in the 113th United States Congress
- Elementary and Secondary Education Act
- No Child Left Behind Act
