= Laura Geller =

American rabbi (born 1950)

- Born: 1950 (age 75–76)
- Education: Brown University
- Occupation: Rabbi
- Title: Rabbi

Laura Geller (born 1950) is an American rabbi. She serves as the rabbi emerita of Temple Emanuel in Beverly Hills, California.

== Early life and education ==
Geller was raised in Brookline, Massachusetts until she was 15, when her family moved to New York City. She attended the Dalton School, then graduated from Brown University in 1971. Geller was ordained by the Hebrew Union College-Jewish Institute of Religion in 1976. In 2000, she was part of the first group of rabbis to attend the Jewish meditation training program of the Institute for Jewish Spirituality.

== Career ==
Prior to her current position, she was the director of the American Jewish Congress branch in Los Angeles from 1990 until 1994. She was also the founding Chair of the City of Beverly Hills Human Relations Commission.

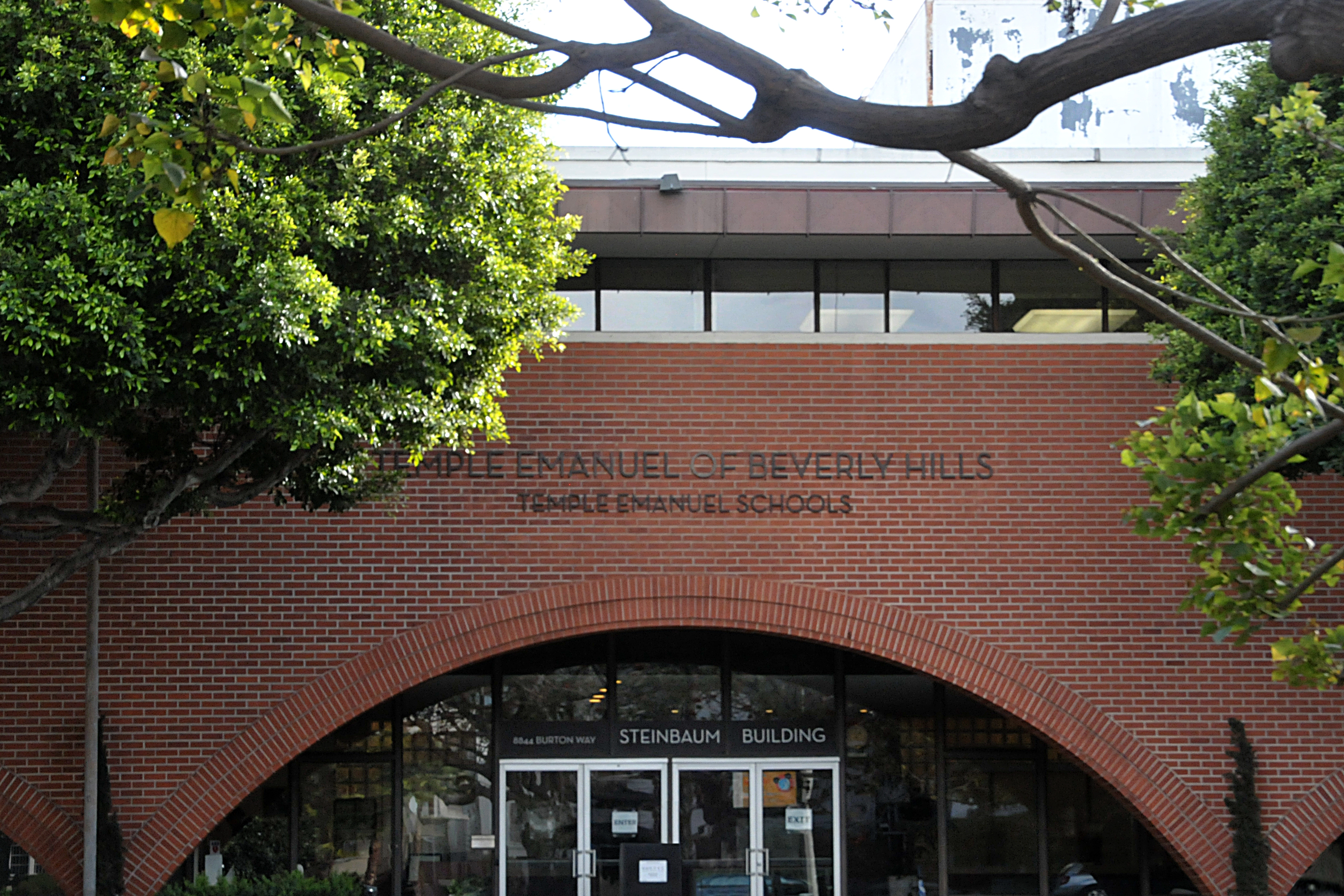
Temple Emanuel.

In 1994, she became the first female rabbi to lead a major metropolitan congregation, Temple Emanuel in Beverly Hills, California. She was also the first female rabbi to become Hillel director at the University of Southern California in Los Angeles, a job she held for fourteen years. While at Hillel, she co-organized the national conference "Illuminating the Unwritten Scroll: Women's Spirituality and Jewish Tradition."

She has been awarded the A.C.L.U. of Southern California Award for Fostering Racial and Cultural Harmony, the Alan J. Kassin Award for Outstanding Professional Achievement, the Los Angeles County Commission on the Status of Women Recognition Award, and the Woman of the Year Award from the California state legislature. In 2000, she was declared one of the "Hundred Most Distinguished Brown University Alumni of the Past Century," and in 2007 The Forward named her one of the "Forward 50 Individuals who are doing or saying things that are making a difference in the way American Jews view themselves (and who) have left a mark." The Forward also named her one of the “50 Most Influential Woman Rabbis in America," and the PBS documentary The Jewish Americans featured her. She served on the Board of Governors of the Hebrew Union College from 2001 until 2008. She is a Rabbinic Fellow at the Hartman Institute in Jerusalem.

In 2010 she was featured in the documentary film Kol Ishah: The Rabbi is a Woman, directed by Hannah Heer.

She wrote the pieces "Rediscovering Regina Jonas: The First Woman Rabbi" and "Women Rabbis and Feminism: On Our Way to the Promised Land", which appear in the book The Sacred Calling: Four Decades of Women in the Rabbinate, published in 2016.

== Other ==
The 2022 art exhibit “Holy Sparks”, shown among other places at the Dr. Bernard Heller Museum, featured art about twenty-four female rabbis who were firsts in some way; Ruth Weisberg created the artwork about Geller that was in that exhibit.

== See also ==
- Timeline of women rabbis
