= Stephen Wise Temple =

Synagogue in Los Angeles, California, USA

- Location in Los Angeles, California

Religion
- Affiliation: Reform Judaism
- Ecclesiastical or organizational status: Synagogue
- Leadership: Rabbi Yoshi Zweiback
- Status: Active

Location
- Location: 15500 Stephen S. Wise Drive, Bel Air, Los Angeles, California
- Country: United States
- Interactive map of Stephen Wise Temple
- Coordinates: 34°07′42″N 118°28′10″W

Architecture
- Type: Synagogue architecture
- Founder: Rabbi Isaiah Zeldin
- Established: 1964 (as a congregation)
- Completed: 1965
- Site area: 18 acres (7.3 ha)

Website
- wisela.org

Stephen Wise Temple is a large Reform Jewish congregation in the Bel Air neighborhood of Los Angeles, California, in the United States. Founded in 1964 by Rabbi Isaiah Zeldin, with 35 families, the congregation grew rapidly. At various times in its history it has been stated to be the largest, or one of the largest, Jewish congregations in the world, at one time having a membership of approximately 3,000 families, six rabbis, two cantors and two cantorial interns, and four schools on three campuses. As of 1994, it was the second-largest synagogue in the United States. The congregation was founded as the Stephen S. Wise Temple, in honor of Stephen Samuel Wise; and 2014 it was renamed as the Stephen Wise Temple.

== History ==
Zeldin was raised in New York City, the son of an Orthodox rabbi. Ordained at the Reform movement's Hebrew Union College in Cincinnati in 1946, he went to Los Angeles in 1953 as western regional director for the Union of American Hebrew Congregations (UAHC) and as dean of the College of Jewish Studies in Los Angeles, a UAHC program that was absorbed into Hebrew Union College in 1954. In 1958 he became rabbi at Temple Emanuel in Beverly Hills.

In 1964 Zeldin and 35 families broke away from Temple Emanuel to establish a new synagogue in Westwood. The new congregation was named for the influential Reform rabbi Stephen Samuel Wise, under whom Zeldin had studied. The new congregation faced immediate controversy as the UAHC felt that some of its members had failed to honor existing commitments to Temple Emanuel, and the UAHC did not accept it for membership for the first five years of its existence. The new congregation was intended to have a membership limited in size to maintain intimacy between the rabbi and the member families, and it met at St. Alban's Episcopal Church in Westwood. A year later, the congregation acquired a site for a permanent home; the size limit policy was changed in 1969; and in 1970, Stephen Wise Temple absorbed the existing Westwood Temple, whose membership had been declining, in part due to disruption from the construction of the San Diego Freeway.

The temple's location, on a 18-acre (7.3 ha) site in Bel Air, near Mulholland Drive and Sepulveda Boulevard, contributed to its continuing growth and success. The location, in the Santa Monica Mountains between the Westside and the San Fernando Valley, meant that the temple attracted members from the growing Jewish population on both sides of the mountains. In order to develop the property, the temple was required to remove 50 feet (15 m) of the existing mountain; the resulting dirt was then used to level the adjoining property, which was acquired for the new campus of the University of Judaism, then located on Sunset Boulevard. The wild area around the Sepulveda Pass eventually developed into an "institutional corridor" with a number of schools and cultural facilities, including the temple's expanding educational ventures, which came to include Stephen S. Wise Temple Elementary School and a pre-school (now collectively called Wise School), and Milken Community High School. (Note: On March 25, 2011, Milken Community High School and Stephen S. Wise Temple announced that the school would become independent from the temple, effective July 1, 2012.)

The congregation became known for its extensive educational and service programs, parenting center, library, swimming pool, bus service, and other services designed for families at all stages. Under Zeldin and its education director, Metuka Benjamin, the temple was an influential proponent of the concept of the Jewish day school in the Reform movement The temple and its cantor, Nathan Lam, also maintained an extensive program of commissioning new musical works.

The religious practice at Stephen S. Wise Temple has been described as more traditional than at many Reform temples, as it uses its own prayer books rather than the official books of the Reform movement. In 1995 the temple again faced controversy in its relationship with the UAHC: a dispute over dues obligations resulted in its expulsion from the organization for a time. As of 2010, the congregational database of the Union for Reform Judaism (as the UAHC is now known) stated that Stephen Wise Temple had 2,886 members, which was more than any other congregation in the database; as of February 2012, the database reported Wise had 2,312 members, still among the largest congregations but smaller than several others. (Note: As of 2012, the same database reported that Temple Israel (West Bloomfield, Michigan) had 3,383 members, Washington Hebrew Congregation had 2,781, and Temple Emanu-El (Dallas, Texas) had 2,546.)

In 1990, Zeldin retired from his duties as Senior Rabbi and was succeeded by Eli Herscher, who remained Senior Rabbi until 2015. At that time, Herscher became Senior Rabbi Emeritus and was succeeded by Yoshi Zweiback. Zeldin died in 2018 at age 97. Rabbi Herscher remains on staff.

In March 2025, Stephen Wise Temple and Schools opened the Aaron Milken Center for Early Childhood Education, a $35 million facility named in honor of Aaron Milken, the deceased son of lead donors Lowell Milken and Sandra Salka Milken. It was built in collaboration of Abramson Architects.
