= Jewish music =

Music and melodies of the Jewish people

Jewish music is the music and melodies of the Jewish people. There exist both traditions of religious music, as sung at the synagogue and in domestic prayers, and of secular music, such as klezmer. While some elements of Jewish music may originate in biblical times (Biblical music), differences of rhythm and sound can be found among later Jewish communities that have been musically influenced by location. In the nineteenth century, religious reform led to composition of ecclesiastic music in the styles of classical music. At the same period, academics began to treat the topic in the light of ethnomusicology. Edwin Seroussi has written, "What is known as 'Jewish music' today is thus the result of complex historical processes". A number of modern Jewish composers have been aware of and influenced by the different traditions of Jewish music.

== Religious Jewish music ==
=== Religious Jewish music in the biblical period ===
The history of religious Jewish music spans the evolution of cantorial, synagogal, and Temple melodies since Biblical times.

The earliest synagogal music of which we have any account was based on the system used in the Temple in Jerusalem. The Mishnah gives several accounts of Temple music. According to the Mishnah, the regular Temple orchestra consisted of twelve instruments, and a choir of twelve male singers. The instruments included the kinnor (lyre), nevel (harp), tof (tambourine), shofar (ram's horn), ḥatzotzᵊrot (trumpet) and three varieties of pipe, the chalil, alamoth and the uggav. The Temple orchestra also included a cymbal (tziltzal) made of copper. The Talmud also mentions use in the Temple of a pipe organ (magrepha), and states that the water organ was not used in the Temple as its sounds were too distracting. No provable examples of the music played at the Temple have survived. However, there is an oral tradition that the tune used for Kol Nidrei was sung in the temple.

After the destruction of the Temple in 70 AD and the subsequent dispersion of the Jews to Babylon and Persia, versions of the public singing of the Temple were continued in the new institution of the synagogue. Three musical forms were identified by scholars of the period, involving different modes of antiphonal response between cantor and congregation: the cantor singing a half-verse at a time, with the congregation making a constant refrain; the cantor singing a half-verse, with the congregation repeating exactly what he had sung; and the cantor and congregation singing alternate verses. All of these forms can be discerned in parts of the modern synagogue service.

=== Jewish prayer modes ===
Jewish liturgical music is characterized by a set of musical modes. These modes make up musical nusach, which serves to both identify different types of prayer, as well as to link those prayers to the time of year, or even time of day in which they are set. There are three main modes, as well as a number of combined or compound modes. The three main modes are called Ahavah Rabbah, Magein Avot and Adonai Malach. Traditionally, the cantor (chazzan) improvised sung prayers within the designated mode, while following a general structure of how each prayer should sound. There was no standard form of musical notation utilised by the Jews and these modes and synagogue melodies derived from them were therefore handed down directly, typically from a chazzan to his apprentice meshorrer (descant). Since the late eighteenth century, many of these chants have been written down and standardized, yet the practice of improvisation still exists to this day.

The synagogal reading of the parashah (the weekly extract from the Torah) and the haftarah (section from the Prophets), may recall the melodic tropes of the actual Temple service. Ashkenazic Jews named this official cantillation 'neginot' and it is represented in printed Hebrew versions of the Bible by a system of cantillation marks (sometimes referred to as neumes). In practice the cantillation often echoes the tones and rhythms of the countries and ages in which Jews lived, notably as regards the modality in which the local music was based.

=== Traditional religious music ===
Synagogues following traditional Jewish rites do not employ musical instruments as part of the synagogue service. Traditional synagogal music is therefore purely vocal. The principal melodic role in the service is that of the hazzan (cantor). Responses of the congregation are typically monophonic—the introduction of a choir singing in harmony was largely a nineteenth-century innovation. However, during the medieval period among Ashkenazi Jews there developed the tradition of the hazzan being accompanied for certain prayers by a bass voice (known in Yiddish as singer) and a descant (in Yiddish, meshorrer). This combination was known in Yiddish as keleichomos.

"Emet El Shmeha", traditional Jewish 17th century song.

There are many forms of song which are used in Jewish religious services and ceremonies. The following are notable examples.

With the piyyutim (liturgical poems—singular: piyut), dating from the first millennium after the destruction of the Temple, one stream of Jewish synagogal music began to crystallize into definite form. The hazzan sang the piyyutim to melodies either selected by themselves or drawn from tradition. Piyyutim have been written since Mishnaic times. Most piyyutim are in Hebrew or Aramaic, and most follow some poetic scheme, such as an acrostic following the order of the Hebrew alphabet or spelling out the name of the author. A well-known piyyut is Adon Olam ("Master of the World"), sometimes attributed to Solomon ibn Gabirol in 11th century Spain.

Pizmonim are traditional Jewish songs and melodies praising God and describing certain aspects of traditional religious teachings. Pizmonim are traditionally associated with Middle Eastern Sephardic Jews, although they are related to Ashkenazi Jews' zemirot (see below). One tradition is associated with Jews descended from Aleppo, though similar traditions exist among Iraqi Jews (where the songs are known as shbaִhoth, praises) and in North African countries. Jews of Greek, Turkish and Balkan origin have songs of the same kind in Ladino, associated with the festivals: these are known as coplas. Some melodies are quite old, while others may be based on popular Middle Eastern music, with the words composed specially to fit the tune.

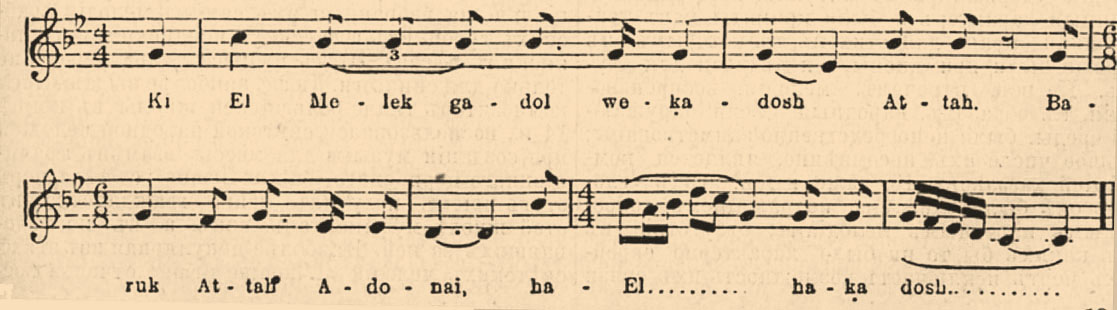

Zemirot are hymns, usually sung in the Hebrew or Aramaic languages, but sometimes also in Yiddish or Ladino. The words to many zemirot are taken from poems written by various rabbis and sages during the Middle Ages. Others are anonymous folk songs.

The baqashot are a collection of supplications, songs, and prayers that have been sung for centuries by the Sephardic Aleppian Jewish community and other congregations every Sabbath eve from midnight until dawn. The custom of singing baqashot originated in Spain towards the time of the expulsion, but took on increased momentum in the Kabbalistic circle in Safed in the 16th century, and were spread from Safed by the followers of Isaac Luria (16th century). Baqashot reached countries all round the Mediterranean and even became customary for a time in Sephardic communities in western Europe, such as Amsterdam and London.

Nigun (pl. nigunim) refers to religious songs and tunes that are sung either by individuals or groups; they are associated with the Hassidic movement. Nigunim are generally wordless.

=== Eighteenth- and nineteenth-century synagogue music ===
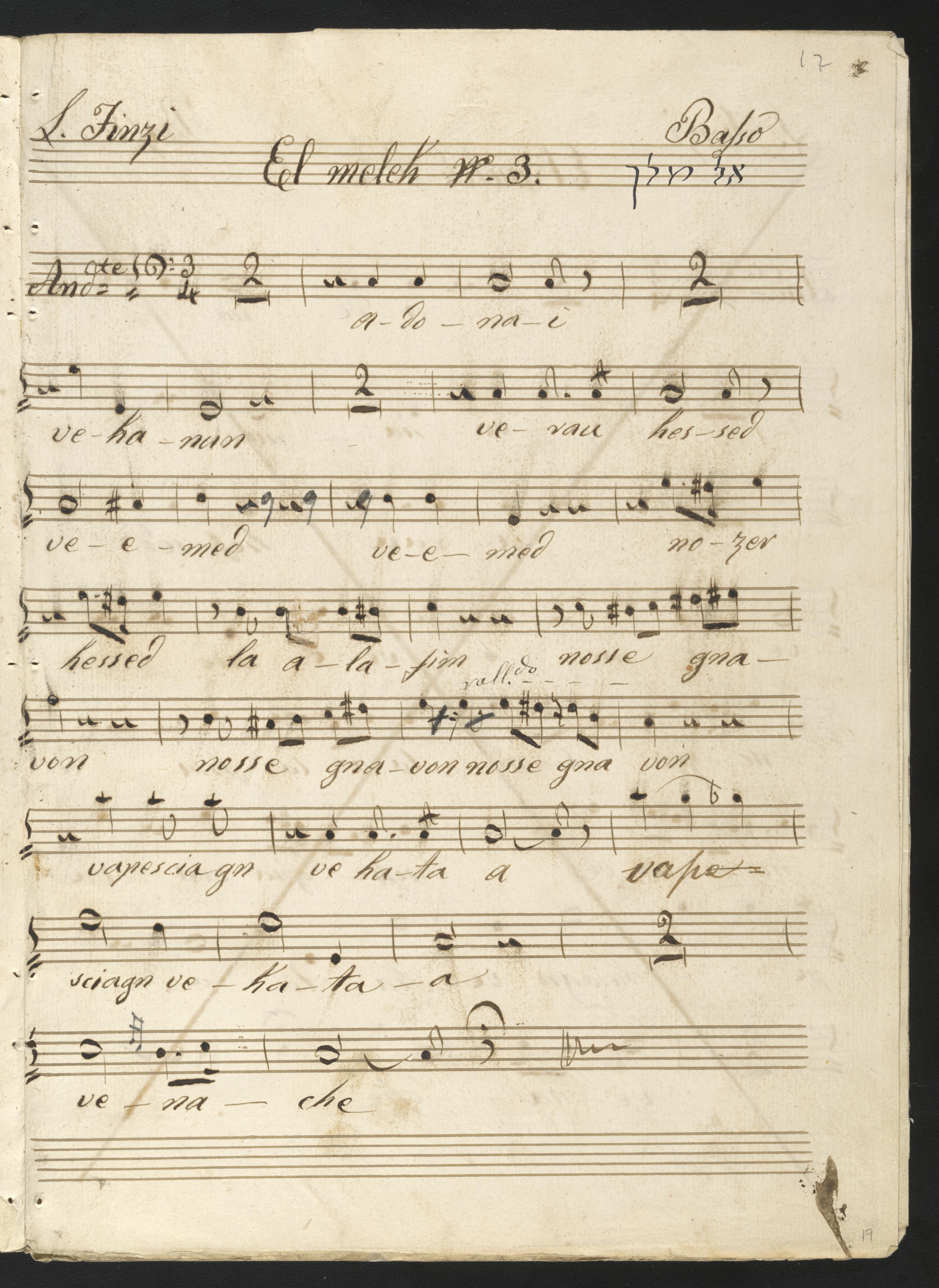
L. Finzi synagogue music 19th c

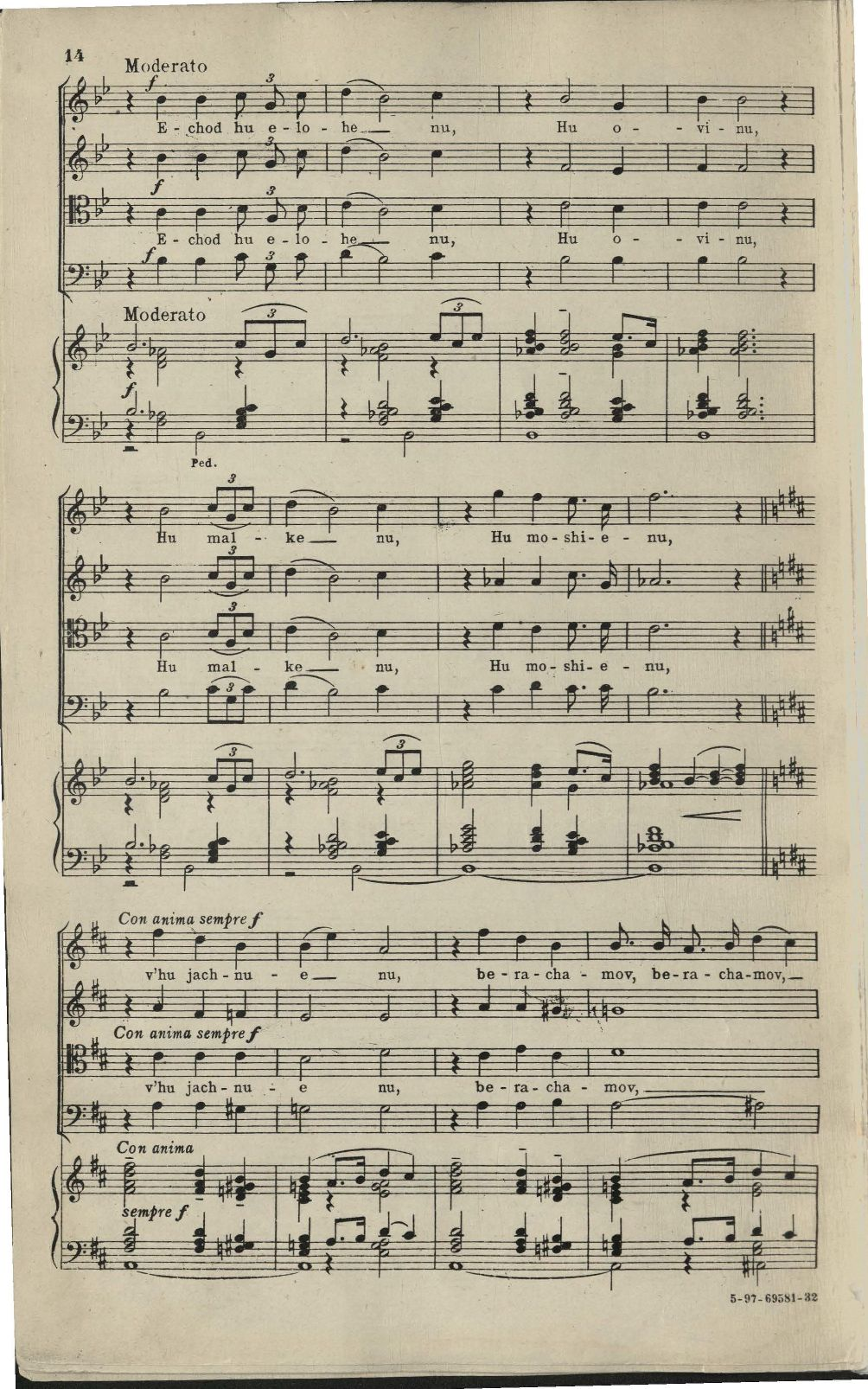
Sabbath morning service for the synagogue : according to the Union Prayer Book, Rogers, 1913

Changes in European Jewish communities, including increasing political emancipation and some elements of religious reform, had their effects on music of the synagogue. By the late eighteenth century, music in European synagogues had sunk to a low standard. The Jewish scholar Eric Werner notes that among the European Ashkenazi communities of Europe "between 1660 and 1720 the musical tradition was waning, and the second half of the eighteenth century witnessed its worst decay". The historian of Jewish music Abraham Zevi Idelsohn considers that "Eighteenth-century manuscripts of Synagogue song display a striking monotony of style and texts". In this context the English music historian Charles Burney visiting the Ashkenazi synagogue of Amsterdam in 1772, gave the opinion of one who was clearly ignorant of synagogue music (but did not regard that as a disqualification for comment) that the service resembled "a kind of tol- de rol, instead of words, which to me, seemed very farcical". (Note: The extent of Burney's lack of understanding, and his possible anti-Jewish sentiments, may be construed from his more detailed comments: "At my first entrance, one of the priests [i.e. the hazzan] was chanting part of the service in a kind of ancient canto fermo, and responses were made by the congregation, in a manner which resembled the hum of bees. After this three of the sweet singers of Israel [...] began singing a kind of jolly modern melody, sometimes in unison and sometimes in parts, to a kind of tol de rol, instead of words, which to me, seemed very farcical ... At the end of each strain, the whole congregation set up such a kind of cry, as a pack of hounds when a fox breaks cover ... It is impossible for me to divine what idea the Jews themselves annex to this vociferation." The historian David Conway notes: " We have in the account of the 'trio' a description of the 'keleichomos', literally [in Hebrew] 'instruments of robbery', an acronym of 'chazan, meshorrer, singer' and a sort of pun on klezmer (= klei zmir, 'instruments of song'); this denoted the accompaniment of the chazan by bass and descant (meshorrer), which became a common practice in European synagogues in the early eighteenth century and had been introduced to Amsterdam [...] between 1700 and 1712. The epithet 'sweet singer of Israel', by the way, derived from the description of King David in 2 Samuel 23.1, was to be used ad nauseam by writers about Jewish musicians in the eighteenth and nineteenth centuries, both in praise and, by their detractors, sarcastically.")

Others in England were more sympathetic to the synagogue service. The singing of the chazan Myer Lyon inspired the Methodist minister Thomas Olivers in 1770 to adapt the melody of the hymn "Yigdal" for a Christian hymn, "The God of Abraham Praise". Many synagogue melodies were used by Isaac Nathan in his 1815 settings of Lord Byron's Hebrew Melodies, and the popularity of this work drew the attention of gentiles for the first time to this music (although in fact many of Nathan's melodies were not Jewish in origin, but contrafacta adapted from European folk melodies).

Franz Schubert around 1828 made a choral setting of Psalm 92 in Hebrew for the Vienna chazan Salomon Sulzer. German congregations commissioned works from other gentile composers, including Albert Methfessel (1785–1869).

Later in the century, as synagogues began to utilize choirs singing in Western harmony, a number of hazzanim, who had received formal training in Western music, began to compose works for the synagogue, many of which are still in use today in the congregations of their countries. These included Salomon Sulzer in Vienna, Samuel Naumbourg in Paris, Louis Lewandowski in Berlin, and Julius Mombach in London.

=== Contemporary Jewish religious music ===
Antisemitism and Modern Jewish Music

According to an article published by James Loeffler, Jewish Music actually played a significant role within modern Jewish music. After Wagner's death in 1883 up until 1933, some people began to think that the Jewish people must abandon ideas of assimilation into European culture. Essentially, Wagner's essay created a necessity for the Jewish people to create their own identity through modern music and remove the fingerprints of antisemitism. Two modern Jewish musicians are Abraham Tzvi Idelsohn and Lazare Saminsky, both musicians who were considered the prime intellectuals of modern Jewish music.

Loeffler, James. 2009. Richard wagner's "jewish music": Antisemitism and aesthetics in modern jewish culture. Jewish Social Studies 15, (2) (Winter): 2-36,167, https://www.proquest.com/docview/195508667 (accessed May 4, 2025).

== Secular Jewish music ==
Secular Jewish music (and dances) have been influenced both by surrounding Gentile traditions and Jewish sources preserved over time.

=== Klezmer ===
Around the 15th century, a tradition of secular (non-liturgical) Jewish music was developed by musicians called kleyzmorim or kleyzmerim by Ashkenazi Jews in Eastern Europe. The repertoire is largely dance songs for weddings and other celebrations. They are typically in Yiddish.

=== Sephardic/Ladino ===
Sephardic music was born in medieval Spain, with canciones being performed at the royal courts. Since then, it has picked up influences from across Spain, Morocco, Argentina, Turkey, Greece and various popular tunes from Spain and further abroad. There are three types of Sephardic songs—topical and entertainment songs, romance songs and spiritual or ceremonial songs. Lyrics can be in several languages, including Hebrew for religious songs, and Ladino.

These song traditions spread from Spain to Morocco (the Western Tradition) and several parts of the Ottoman Empire (the Eastern Tradition) including Greece, Jerusalem, the Balkans and Egypt. Sephardic music adapted to each of these locals, assimilating North African high-pitched, extended ululations; Balkan rhythms, for instance in 9/8 time; and the Turkish maqam mode.

== Jewish art music ==
=== Preclassical, classical, romantic and 20th-century composers ===
Salamone Rossi (1570 – c. 1630) of Mantua composed a series of choral settings titled "the Songs of Solomon", based on Jewish liturgical and biblical texts.

Most 19th-century art musicians of Jewish origin composed music that cannot be considered Jewish in any sense. In the words of Peter Gradenwitz, from this period onwards, the issue is "no longer the story of Jewish music, but the story of music by Jewish masters." Jacques Offenbach (1819–1880), a leading operetta composer in the 19th century, was the son of a hazzan (Hebrew: חַזָּן, romanized: ḥazzān, lit. 'cantor'), and grew up steeped in traditional Jewish music. Yet there is nothing in his music that could be characterized as Jewish in style, and he himself did not consider his work to be Jewish. Felix Mendelssohn, the grandson of the Jewish philosopher Moses Mendelssohn, continued to acknowledge his Jewish origins despite being baptized as a Reformed Christian at the age of seven. He occasionally drew inspiration from Christian sources, but there is nothing characteristically Jewish about any of his music.

=== The Jewish national revival in art music ===
At the end of the 19th and beginning of the 20th centuries, many Jewish composers sought to create a distinctly Jewish national sound in their music. Notable among these were the composers of the St. Petersburg Society for Jewish Folk Music. Led by composer and music critic Joel Engel, graduates of the St. Petersburg and Moscow Conservatories rediscovered their Jewish national roots and created a new genre of Jewish art music. Inspired by the nationalist movement in Russian music, exemplified by Rimsky-Korsakov, Cui and others, these Jewish composers set out to the "shtetls" (Yiddish: שטעטלן)—the Jewish villages of Russia—and meticulously recorded and transcribed thousands of Yiddish folksongs. They then set these songs to both vocal and instrumental ensembles. The resulting music is a marriage between the often melancholy and krekhtsen (קרעכצן, 'to moan') melodies of the shtetl and the late Russian romantic harmonies of Scriabin and Rachmaninoff.

The trend toward Romantic nationalism in late-19th- and early-20th-century Jewish music was not limited to Russia. A number of Western European composers took an interest in their Jewish musical roots and tried to create a unique Jewish art style. Ernest Bloch (1880–1959), a Swiss composer who emigrated to the United States, composed Schelomo for cello and orchestra, Suite Hebraique for viola and piano, and Sacred Service, the first attempt to set the Jewish prayer service in a form similar to the Requiem, for full orchestra, choir and soloists. Bloch described his connection to Jewish music as intensely personal:

It is not my purpose, nor my desire, to attempt a 'reconstitution' of Jewish music, or to base my work on melodies more or less authentic. I am not an archeologist.... It is the Jewish soul that interests me ... the freshness and naiveté of the Patriarchs; the violence of the Prophetic books; the Jewish savage love of justice...

As a child in Aix-en-Provence, Darius Milhaud (1892–1974) was exposed to the music of the Jews of Provence. "I have been greatly influenced by the character" of this music, he wrote. His opera Esther de Carpentras draws on this rich musical heritage. Mario Castelnuovo-Tedesco (1895–1968), an Italian composer who immigrated to America on the eve of World War II, was strongly influenced by his Sephardic Jewish upbringing. His second violin concerto draws on Jewish themes, as do many of his songs and choral works: these include a number of songs in Judeo-Spanish (גֿודֿיאו־איספאנייול), a language used by Sephardic Jews more commonly known as Ladino (Ladino: לאדינו, lit. 'Latin') in the contemporary era.

== Israeli music ==
=== Art music in Mandatory Palestine and Israel ===
The 1930s saw an influx of Jewish composers to British Mandatory Palestine, later Israel, among them musicians of stature in Europe. These composers included Paul Ben-Haim, Erich Walter Sternberg, Marc Lavry, Ödön Pártos, and Alexander Uriah Boskovich. These composers were all concerned with forging a new Jewish identity in music, an identity which would suit the new, emerging identity of Israel. While the response of each of these composers to this challenge was intensely personal, there was one distinct trend to which many of them adhered: many of these and other composers sought to distance themselves from the musical style of the Klezmer, which they viewed as weak and unsuitable for the new national ethos. Many of the stylistic features of Klezmer were abhorrent to them. "Its character is depressing and sentimental", wrote music critic and composer Menashe Ravina in 1943. "The healthy desire to free ourselves of this sentimentalism causes many to avoid this...".

From these early experiments a large corpus of original Israeli art music has been developed. Modern Israeli composers include Betty Olivero, Tsippi Fleischer, Mark Kopytman and Yitzhak Yedid.

=== Israeli folk ===
From the earliest days of Zionist settlement, Jewish immigrants wrote popular folk music. At first, songs were based on borrowed melodies from German, Russian, or traditional Jewish folk music with new lyrics written in Hebrew. Starting in the early 1920s, however, Jewish immigrants made a conscious effort to create a new Hebrew style of music, a style that would tie them to their earliest Hebrew origins and that would differentiate them from the style of the Jewish diaspora of Eastern Europe, which they viewed as weak. This new style borrowed elements from Arabic and, to a lesser extent, traditional Yemenite and eastern Jewish styles: the songs were often homophonic (that is, without clear harmonic character), modal, and limited in range. "The huge change in our lives demands new modes of expression", wrote composer and music critic Menashe Ravina in 1943. "... and, just as in our language we returned to our historical past, so has our ear turned to the music of the east ... as an expression of our innermost feelings."

Your Land, a Hebrew song adapted to a traditional Bedouin Melody.

The youth, labor and kibbutz movements played a major role in musical development before and after the establishment of Israeli statehood in 1948, and in the popularization of these songs. The Zionist establishment saw music as a way of establishing a new national identity, and, on a purely pragmatic level, of teaching Hebrew to new immigrants. The national labor organization, the Histadrut, set up a music publishing house that disseminated songbooks and encouraged public sing-alongs (שירה בציבור). This tradition of public sing-alongs continues to the present day, and is a characteristic of modern Israeli culture.

=== Mizrahi ===
Mizrahi music usually refers to the new wave of music in Israel which combines Israeli music with the flavor of Arabic and Mediterranean (especially Greek) music. Typical Mizrahi songs will have a dominant violin or string sound as well as Middle Eastern percussion elements. Mizrahi music is usually high pitched. Zohar Argov is a popular singer whose music typifies the Mizrahi music style.

== Non-Jewish composers using Jewish music ==
Sergei Prokofiev: Overture on Hebrew Themes
Performed by members of the Advent Chamber Orchestra

A number of non-Jewish composers have adapted Jewish music to their compositions. They include:

- Maurice Ravel wrote Mélodies hébraïques for violin and piano.
- Max Bruch, a German Protestant, (but a student of the German Jewish composer Ferdinand Hiller) made an arrangement, Kol Nidrei, of the Jewish Yom Kippur prayer Kol Nidre for cello and orchestra.
- Sergei Prokofiev wrote Overture on Hebrew Themes, an arrangement of traditional Jewish folksongs for clarinet, string quartet, and piano.
- Dmitri Shostakovich incorporated elements of Jewish music in some of his compositions. Most notable are the song cycle From Jewish Folk Poetry, and the 13th symphony, titled Babi Yar.

== See also ==
- Biblical music
- List of Jewish musicians
- Klezmer

== Bibliography ==
- Burney, Charles, ed. Percy A. Scholes (1959). An Eighteenth Century Musical Tour in Central Europe and the Netherlands. " vols. London: Oxford University Press.
- Conway, David (2012). Jewry in Music: Entry to the Profession from the Enlightenment to Richard Wagner. Cambridge: Cambridge University Press. ISBN 978-1-107-01538-8
- Gradenwitz, Peter (1996). The Music of Israel from the Biblical Era to Modern Times. 2nd. edition. Portland: Amadeus Press.
- Idelsohn, A. Z., Thesaurus of Hebrew Oriental song (10 vols.)
- Idelsohn, A. Z., int. A. Orenstein (1992). Jewish Music: Its Historical Development. New York: Dover.
- Seroussi, Edwin et al. (n.d.), "Jewish Music" in Oxford Music Online (subscription required)
- Walden, Joshua S. (2015). The Cambridge Companion to Jewish Music. Cambridge and New York: Cambridge University Press.
- Werner, Eric (1976). A Voice Still Heard: The Sacred Songs of the Ashkenazic Jews. Philadelphia: Pennsylvania State University Press
