= Praise to the Living God =

American Judeo-Christian hymn

"Praise to the Living God" is an American Judeo-Christian hymn written in 1884 by Max Landsberg and Newton Mann. It was revised in 1910 by William C. Gannett.

== History ==
Landsberg was a Jewish rabbi of German origin in Rochester, New York. In 1884, he approached Mann, a Unitarian minister, for assistance in adapting the British Methodist hymn "The God of Abraham Praise", itself a loose and Christianized translation of the Jewish hymn "Yigdal", into a more accurate and less Christianized translation of "Yigdal" for interfaith use. Mann wrote "Praise to the Living God" as a version of Yigdal that was suitable for use in both Jewish and Christian worship. However, in 1910, William C. Gannett was approached by Landsberg to revise the hymn. A revision was subsequently completed, despite Gannett claiming it was not his work, and the revised hymn first appeared in the Jewish Union Hymnal in the same year.

"Praise to The Living God" and its lyrics have often been combined with other hymns to create hybrids. In the 1930s, for example, "The God of Abraham Praise" was sung to a melody called "Leoni" which was composed by Myer Lyon and adopted by Thomas Olivers as the music for the hymn. In 1933, the editors of The Presbyterian Hymnal decided to replace "The God of Abraham Praise" with "Praise to The Living God" in the hymnal. In order to make the new hymn familiar to the congregation, they set it to the tune of the old hymn and substituted the first line of the old with the first line of the new. Consequently, several American hymnals until the 1980s misattributed "The God of Abraham Praise" to Landsberg and Mann instead of crediting Olivers.
