= The God of Abraham Praise =

Christian adaptation of the Jewish hymn of Yigdal

- Genre: Hymn
- Written: 1770
- Text: Daniel ben Judah, paraphrased by Thomas Olivers
- Based on: Exodus 3:6
- Meter: 6.6.8.4 D
- Melody: "Leoni" by Myer Lyon

The God of Abraham Praise is a Christian adaptation of the well known Jewish hymn "Yigdal", loosely translated and Christianised by the evangelist Thomas Olivers after a visit to the Great Synagogue of London in 1770. It was first published in 1772. The title of the hymn was based on a verse in the Book of Exodus: "I am the God of thy Father, the God of Abraham".

== History ==
Olivers worked with John Wesley during the time that "The God of Abraham Praise" was written. During the time, he often met with members of London's Jewish community. In 1772, Olivers was attending The Great Synagogue in London and heard Cantor Myer Lyon sing "Yigdal" in Hebrew during a service. Olivers then paraphrased and translated "Yigdal" into English and gave the hymn more of a Christian focus. He then asked Lyon if he could use the Jewish melody for the new hymn. Lyon gave him the music and Olivers named this hymn tune "Leoni" after Lyon. When he showed the new hymn to a friend, he annotated each line with scriptural references from The Bible.

"The God of Abraham Praise" was first published as a leaflet titled "A Hymn to the God of Abraham" in 1772. It was later published nationwide by Wesley in the Methodist hymnal "Sacred Harmony". The hymn later made it to the United States after being published in Joshua Leavitt's "The Christian Lyre". The hymn was composed by Olivers with thirteen verses however later reprints of the hymn omit a number of them with the majority of hymn books using four verses.

In the early 20th century in the United States, "The God of Abraham Praise" was often confused with "Praise To the Living God", another translation of "Yigdal" by Max Landsberg and Newton Mann. Several Presbyterian, Baptist and UCC hymnals misattributed "The God of Abraham Praise" to them instead of Olivers due to William Gannett recasting the work to change the title from "Praise to the Living God" to "The God of Abraham Praise". A number of versions of Methodist hymnals also made the same error until the 1980s.

== Interfaith dialogue ==
The Judeo-Christian context of "The God of Abraham Praise" has caused the hymn to be used in interfaith services between Jews and Christians. It has been referred to as "the hymn born in a synagogue".

== See also ==
- Yigdal § In Christian hymnals
