= David ben Samuel of Estelle =

David ben Samuel of Estelle (Kohkavi or Kokabi, meaning "star-like" as "Estella," d. ca 1340.) was a Provençal Jewish scholar, talmudist, and author of a literary history of rabbinical scholarship known as the Qiryat Sefer (City of the Book) from France. He was in Avignon around 1305. He is a follower of Maimonides and surveys the Geonim, the Tosafists, the scholars of Narbonne and Provence, and briefly mentions Meir of Rothenburg. He was cited with high approval by Isaac Lattes. He is the author of Migdal Dawid (Castle of David), on Jewish theology. It expounds the Jewish principles of faith and is patterned after Maimonides' Book of Commandments.
