= Judah ibn Abbas =

Jewish poet (died 1163)

Judah ibn Abbas of Fez (Hebrew: יהודה אבן עבאס; died 1163) was a Jewish Hebrew-language poet, and author of the piyyut (Jewish liturgical poem) "Et sha'are ratson". He was the first Jew known by the name of Abbas.

== Life ==
According to Yehuda Alharizi (Taḥkemoni, Mak. iii.), Judah left the Maghreb and went to the East, where he lived in Baghdad and in Aleppo, and had a son who was refractory. Accordingly, Judah is identical with the father of Samuel, who converted to Islam, and who speaks of his father as Judah b. Abun. The latter is mentioned in the "Poetics" of Moses ibn Ezra. He is said to have been a friend of Judah Halevi. The collector of Halevi's "Diwan" has preserved one of the poems of Judah which called forth an answer from Halevi.

Judah ibn Abbas died at Mosul in 1163.
