= Al-Samawal al-Maghribi =

12th-century Muslim mathematician, astronomer and physician

Samauʼal Al-Maghribī
- Born: c. 1130; Baghdad, Abbasid Caliphate
- Died: c. 1180; Maragheh, Ahmadili Azerbaijan

Academic background
- Influences: Abu'l-Barakāt al-Baghdādī

Academic work
- Era: Islamic Golden Age
- Main interests: Mathematics, Medicine

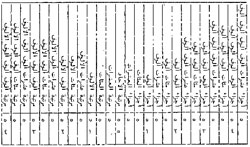
Al-Samaw-al Polynomial. Illustration of the al-Bahir fi'l-Jabr "The Brilliant in Algebra" from the 12th century.

Al-Samawʾal ibn Yaḥyā al-Maghribī (Arabic: السموأل بن يحيى المغربي, c. 1130 – c. 1180), commonly known as Samawʾal al-Maghribi or Samuel the Moroccan, was a mathematician, astronomer and physician. Born to a Jewish family of Moroccan origin, he concealed his conversion to Islam for many years for fear of offending his father, then openly embraced Islam in 1163 after he had a dream telling him to do so. His father was a rabbi from Morocco named Yehuda ibn Abūn.

== Mathematics ==
Al-Samaw'al wrote the mathematical treatise al-Bahir fi'l-jabr, meaning "The brilliant in algebra", at the age of nineteen.

He also used the two basic concepts of mathematical induction, though without stating them explicitly. He used this to extend results for the binomial theorem up to n=12 and Pascal's triangle previously given by al-Karaji.

== Polemics ==
He also wrote a famous polemic book in Arabic debating Judaism known as Ifḥām al-Yahūd (Confutation of the Jews). A Latin tract translated from Arabic and later translated into many Western languages, titled Epistola Samuelis Marrocani ad R. Isaacum contra errores Judaeorum, claims to be authored by a certain R. Samuel of Fez "about the year 1072" and is erroneously connected with him.
