= Et sha'are ratson =

12th-century Jewish liturgical poem

Et sha'are ratson (Hebrew: עֵת שַׁעֲרֵי רָצוֹן, romanized: ʿEt shaʿarē raṣōn) is a piyyut on the Binding of Isaac, written in the 12th century by Judah ben Samuel ibn Abbas of Fez. It is recited prior to the sounding of the shofar in the Sephardic and Mizrahi Rosh Hashanah services.

In the traditional Spanish and Portuguese liturgy, it is associated with an ancient Morisco chant, characteristic of its origin in the southern cities of Spain. This can be observed in the prominence of the third and fifth degrees of the scale, and in the combination and repetition of brief phrases in sentences of different lengths.

== Text ==
Hebrew

עֵת שַׁעֲרֵי רָצוֹן לְהִפָּתֵחַ
יוֹם אֶהְיֶה כַפַּי לְאֵל שׁוֹטֵחַ
אָנָּא זְכוֹר נָא לִי בְּיוֹם הוֹכֵחַ
עוֹקֵד וְהַנֶּעְקָד וְהַמִּזְבֵּחַ

בָּאַחֲרִית נֻסָּה בְּסוֹף הָעֲשָׂרָה
הַבֵּן אֲשֶׁר נוֹלַד לְךָ מִשָּׂרָה
אִם נַפְשְׁךָ בוֹ עַד מְאד נִקְשָׁרָה
קוּם הַעֲלֵהוּ לִי לְעוֹלָה בָרָה

עַל הַר אֲשֶׁר כָּבוֹד לְךָ זוֹרֵחַ
עוֹקֵד וְהַנֶּעְקָד וְהַמִּזְבֵּחַ

Transliteration

'Et sha'are raṣon lehippateaḥ,
Yom eheyeh kappai le-El shoṭoaḥ:
Anna zěkor na li beyom hokeaḥ,
'Oḳed wehane'ḳad wehamizbeaḥ.

Běaḥarit nusah, besof ha'asarah,
Haben asher nolad leka mi-Sarah.
Im nafsheka bo 'ad meod niḳsharah,
Ḳum ha'alehu li le'olah barah.

'Al har asher kabod laka zoreaḥ,
'Oḳed wehane'ḳad wehamizbeaḥ.

English translation

We come, what time the gates of favor open,
This day when unto God in prayer appealing:
For us remember, now we stand in judgment,
The binder and the bound upon the altar.

Unto this patriarch, a last, tenth trial,
That son that hath been born to thee by Sarah.
Though bound thy soul to him in bonds most tender,
Arise and offer him to Me an off'ring.

Upon that mount far off where glory waits thee,
The binder and the bound upon the altar.
