= Yigdal =

Jewish prayer

Yigdal (Hebrew: יִגְדַּל, romanized: yiḡdal, lit. 'be exalted') is a Jewish hymn which, in various rituals, shares with Adon Olam the place of honor at the opening of the morning and the close of the evening service. It is based on the 13 principles of faith (sometimes referred to as "the 13 Creeds") formulated by Maimonides. This was not the only metrical presentment of the 13 principles, but it has outlived all others, whether in Hebrew or the vernacular. A translation can be found in any bilingual siddur.

Among Ashkenazi Jews, only thirteen lines are sung, one for each principle; the last line, dealing with the resurrection of the dead, is repeated to complete the antiphon when the hymn is responsorially sung by the hazzan and congregation. Sephardic Jews, who sing the hymn in congregational unison throughout, use the following line as the 14th: "These are the 13 bases of the Rule of Moses and the tenets of his Law."

== Authorship ==
There is scholarly debate as to the hymn's author. Leopold Zunz contends that it was written by Daniel ben Judah, who spent eight years improving it before completing it in 1404. Some interpret the final line of Yigdal as bearing the signature "Yechiel b'Rav Baruch," though the identity remains uncertain. Hartwig Hirschfeld contends that the renowned poet Immanuel the Roman authored it. Immanuel attempted several poetic renditions of the 13 principles, including a 72-line piece called "Poem Based on the 13 Articles"; Yigdal shares a similar rhythm, rhyme, and phrase structure with this poem.

== Text ==
Hebrew	English
1. .יִגְדַּל אֱלֹהִים חַי וְיִשְׁתַּבַּח - נִמְצָא וְאֵין עֵת אֶל מְצִיאוּתוֹ; 2. .אֶחָד וְאֵין יָחִיד כְּיִחוּדוֹ - נֶעְלָם וְגַם אֵין סוֹף לְאַחְדּוּתוֹ; 3. .אֵין לוֹ דְּמוּת הַגּוּף וְאֵינוֹ גוּף - לֹא נַעֲרוֹךְ אֵלָיו קְדֻשָּׁתוֹ; 4. .קַדְמוֹן לְכָל דָּבָר אֲשֶׁר נִבְרָא - רִאשׁוֹן וְאֵין רֵאשִׁית לְרֵאשִׁיתוֹ; 5. .הִנּוֹ אֲדוֹן עוֹלָם לְכָל (וְכָל) נוֹצָר - יוֹרֶה גְּדֻלָּתוֹ וּמַלְכוּתוֹ; 6. .שֶׁפַע נְבוּאָתוֹ נְתָנוֹ - אֶל אַנְשֵׁי סְגֻלָּתוֹ וְתִפְאַרְתּוֹ; 7. .לֹא קָם בְּיִשְׂרָאֵל כְּמשֶׁה עוֹד נָבִיא - וּמַבִּיט אֶת תְּמוּנָתוֹ; 8. .תּוֹרַת אֱמֶת נָתַן לְעַמּוֹ אֵל - עַל יַד נְבִיאוֹ נֶאֱמַן בֵּיתוֹ; 9. .לֹא יַחֲלִיף הָאֵל וְלֹא יָמִיר דָּתוֹ - לְעוֹלָמִים לְזוּלָתוֹ; 10. .צוֹפֶה וְיוֹדֵעַ סְתָרֵינוּ - מַבִּיט לְסוֹף דָּבָר בְּקַדְמָתוֹ; 11. .גּוֹמֵל לְאִישׁ חֶסֶד כְּמִפְעָלוֹ - יִתֵּן לְרָשָׁע רָע כְּרִשְׁעָתוֹ; 12. .יִשְׁלַח לְקֵץ יָמִין מְשִׁיחֵנוּ - לִפְדּוֹת מְחַכֵּי קֵץ יְשׁוּעָתוֹ; 13. .מֵתִים יְחַיֶּה אֵל בְּרֹב חַסְדּוֹ - בָּרוּךְ עֲדֵי עַד שֵׁם תְּהִלָּתוֹ; 14. [אֵלֶּה שלוש עֶשרֵה לְעִקָּרִים. הֵן הֵם יְסוֹד דַּת אֵל וְתוֹרָתוֹ: 15. תּוֹרַת מֹשה אֱמֶת וּנְבוּאָתוֹ. בָּרוּךְ עֲדֵי עַד שם תְּהִלָּתוֹ:(ספרדי)]	1. Exalted be the Living God and praised, He exists – unbounded by time is His existence; 2. He is One – and there is no unity like His Oneness – Inscrutable and infinite is His Oneness; 3. He has no semblance of a body nor is He corporeal – nor has His holiness any comparison; 4. He preceded every being that was created – the First, and nothing precedes His precedence; 5. Behold! He is Master of the universe – Every creature demonstrates His greatness and His sovereignty; 6. He granted His flow of prophecy – to His treasured, splendid people; 7. No prophet like Moses arose again in Israel, who perceived His vision; 8. God gave His people a Torah of truth – by means of His prophet, the most trusted of His household; 9. God will never amend nor exchange His law – for any other one, for all eternity; 10. He scrutinizes and knows our hiddenmost secrets – He perceives a matter's outcome at its inception; 11. He recompenses man with kindness according to his deed – He places evil on the wicked according to his wickedness; 12. By the End of Days He will send our Messiah – to redeem those longing for His final salvation; 13. God will revive the dead in His abundant kindness – Blessed forever is His praised Name.; 14. These are the thirteen fundamentals, they are the foundation of the religion of God and His faithful. [used in Sephardi tradition]; 15. The Torah of Moses and his prophecy is true, blessed for eternity be His praised Name. [used in Sephardi tradition]

== Customs and tunes ==
=== Sephardic tunes ===
Yigdal far surpasses Adon Olam in the number of its traditional tunes and the length of time during which they have been traditional. In the Sephardic rite, in its Dutch-and English-speaking tradition, the hymn is often sung, according to the general Sephardic custom (compare e.g., Yah Shimkha), to some "representative" melody of the particular day. Thus, for example, it is chanted at the close of evening service on Rosh Hashana to the tune of 'Et Sha'are Raẓon. On Friday evening, the Shabbat Yigdal is customarily sung to the same melody as are Adon Olam and Ein Keloheinu. On the Three Pilgrimage Festivals, the melody shown here is the tune favored. Its old Spanish character is evident.

=== Ashkenazic tunes ===
In the Eastern Ashkenazic rite, Yigdal commences the morning prayer (Shacharit. In some communities, it is sung at the close of the evening service on Shabbat and festivals, but in other communities, it is replaced by Adon Olam or simply omitted; in some communities, it is recited only on festivals and not on Shabbat. In London, for fully two centuries, there has been allotted to the hymn, according to the occasion, a definite tradition of tunes, all of which are antiphonal between the hazzan and congregation. The most familiar of these tunes is the Friday evening Yigdal. It is also utilized in Germany and in some parts of Poland and Bohemia during festivals. The melody may date from the 17th century or perhaps earlier. The tune was also used by the hazzan Myer Lyon (who also sang on the London opera stage as Michael Leoni) at the Great Synagogue of London, where it was heard by the Methodist Thomas Olivers; he adapted the tune for the English hymn The God of Abraham Praise (see below).

Next in importance comes the melody reserved for the solemn evenings of Rosh Hashana and Yom Kippur, and introduced, in the spirit of Psalm 137:6, into the service of Simhat Torah. This melody is constructed in the harmonic major scale with two augmented seconds, and is the inspiration of some Polish precentor, dating perhaps from the early 17th century, and certainly having spread westward from the Slavic region. In German use, Bavaria and the Rhineland have preserved an old tradition of contrasting "Yigdal" for Rosh Hashana and Yom Kippur that is equally antique, but built on a diatonic scale and reminiscent of the morning service of the day.

For the evenings of the Three Pilgrimage Festivals, the old London tradition has preserved three characteristic melodies from at least the early 18th century, probably brought from north Germany or Bohemia. That for Passover illustrates the old custom according to which the precentor solemnly dwells on the last creed, that on the resurrection of the dead (in this case to a "representative" theme common to Passover and to Purim), and is answered by the choristers with an expression of confident assurance. The choral response here given received its final shaping from David Mombach. Yigdal for Shavuot has a solemn tone, strikingly contrasting with those for the other festivals.

The tune for Sukkot displays a gaiety quite rare in synagogal melody. It was employed by Isaac Nathan, in 1815, as the air for one of Lord Byron's "Hebrew Melodies", being set by him to the verses "The Wild Gazelle" in such a manner as to utilize the contrasting theme then chanted by the hazzan to the last line as in the Passover Yigdal. Other old tunes for the hymn, such as the melody of Alsatian origin used on Shabbat Hagadol before Passover, are preserved in local or family tradition.

=== Opposition to its addition to the liturgy ===
Most Hasidic Jews do not recite Yigdal as part of their liturgy, as Isaac Luria reportedly omitted it from his siddur. Luria rejected any poem that he dated after the Talmudic era as insufficiently kabbalistic. However, based on the teachings of Isaiah Horowitz, most do consider Yigdal to be a sacred hymn, even if they do not sing it.

For similar reasons, Syrian Jews omit both Adon Olam and Yigdal at the end of the morning and evening services, but sing them on other occasions (Adon Olam at the end of the Baqashot and Yigdal before Kiddush on Friday night). Rabbi Joseph B. Soloveitchik opposed the recitation of Yigdal at the end of prayers, as he saw it as an improper imitation of the Christian custom to recite a catechism at the end of prayers.

== In Christian hymnals ==
Yigdal appears in translation in several Christian hymnals. The hymn The God of Abraham Praise, written by Thomas Olivers around 1770, is based on one of the traditional melodies for Yigdal; the words are recognizable as a paraphrase of it. As originally printed in John Wesley's Hymnbook for the use of Christians of all Denominations in 1785, it was very Christianized.

In the late 19th century, Rabbi Max Landsberg and Unitarian minister Newton M. Mann produced a new translation of Yigdal known as Praise To the Living God. This first appeared in the Reform Jewish Union Hymnal. This translation, while far less Christianized than the Olivers version, has been used in many Christian hymnals (although some contain hybrids of the Olivers and the Landsberg-Mann texts and have confusing attributions). All Christian versions stick closely to the melody known as "Leoni", collected from Hazzan Myer Lyon at the Great Synagogue of London in 1770, but the meters printed in different hymnals differ considerably.

== See also ==
- Piyyut

== Sources ==
Its bibliography:

- A. Baer, Ba'al Tefillah, Nos. 2, 432-433, 760-762, 774, 988-993, Frankfort-on-the-Main, 1883
- Cohen and Davis, The Voice of Prayer and Praise, Nos. 28-29, 139-142, 195, London, 1899.
