= Daniel ben Judah =

Italian rabbi

Daniel ben Judah was a Jewish liturgical poet, who lived at Rome in the middle of the fourteenth century CE. He was the grandfather of Daniel ben Samuel ha-Rofe, rabbi at Tivoli.

According to the 19th-century German rabbi Leopold Zunz, ben Judah was the author of the well-known hymn Yigdal Elohim Hai containing the thirteen articles of belief of Maimonides; ben Judah spent eight years in improving it, completing it in 1404. This poem, which forms part of the morning prayer among the Ashkenazim, and is sung by the Sephardim on the eve of Sabbaths and holy days, is included in the Romaniot ritual for Saturday evening.
