= Thomas Olivers =

Welsh Wesleyan methodist preacher and hymn-writer

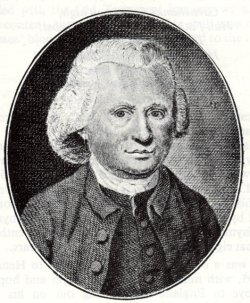

Personal life
- Born: 1725 Tregynon, Montgomeryshire, Wales
- Died: 1799 (aged 73–74) London, England
- Notable work: The God of Abraham Praise

Religious life
- Religion: Christianity
- Denomination: Methodism

Thomas Olivers (1725–1799) was a Methodist preacher and hymn-writer from Tregynon, Montgomeryshire, Wales. He was also author of the Arminian Magazine from 1775 to 1789, when he was dropped from the position by John Wesley for numerous printing errors.

== Early life ==
Thomas Olivers was born in 1725 in the Welsh village of Tregynon in Montgomeryshire. Both his father and his mother died when he was four years old. He grew up to be an apprentice shoemaker and he became a profligate and reckless young man. After his involvement in a scandal which forced him to leave his home, Olivers travelled to Bristol where he heard George Whitfield preach on the text "is not this a brand plucked from the fire?" (Zechariah 3:2). Olivers was converted and stated a desire to follow Whitfield however one of Whitfield's preachers discouraged him and instead he joined the Methodist society and met one of the founders of Methodism, John Wesley there.

== Ministry ==
After joining Wesley as a preacher, Olivers was initially stationed to preach in Cornwall. He was later stationed to preach all around Great Britain and Ireland because of his fearless preaching style. In 1757 he was part of the Limerick circuit in Ireland where he inspired Eliza Bennis with his insights.

Olivers also had good relations with Great Britain's Jewish community, attending Jewish synagogues and became friends with Rabbi Myer Lyon. In 1775, Wesley appointed Olivers to co-write the Arminian Magazine with him. Olivers often exercised control over the content of the magazine. Due to a lack of formal education, Olivers' editorial of the magazine contained several printing errors, which annoyed Wesley but he persevered with Olivers whom he counted as a friend and attached a list of errors at the back of the yearly annual in 1778. However following an "astounding number of errata", Wesley declared in a letter that "I cannot, dare not, will not suffer Thomas Olivers to murder the Arminian Magazine any longer. The errata are intolerable and innumerable. They shall be so no more" and removed Olivers from his position in 1789. Despite this, Olivers and Wesley remained good friends, often viewed as a father-son relationship. When Olivers died in March 1799 in London, he was buried in Wesley's grave.

== Hymn writing ==
Along with preaching, Olivers was also a hymn-writer and wrote 20 hymns. His most well-known hymn was "The God of Abraham Praise", which he wrote after hearing Lyon sing "Yigdal" in the Great Synagogue of London. He was inspired by Lyon and paraphrased Yigdal to give it a Christian character and was given the music by Lyon, which Olivers subsequently titled "Leoni" after Lyon.

== See also ==
- List of 18th-century British working-class writers
