= Adon Olam =

Hymn in the Jewish liturgy

Adon Olam by Irina Rosenfeld

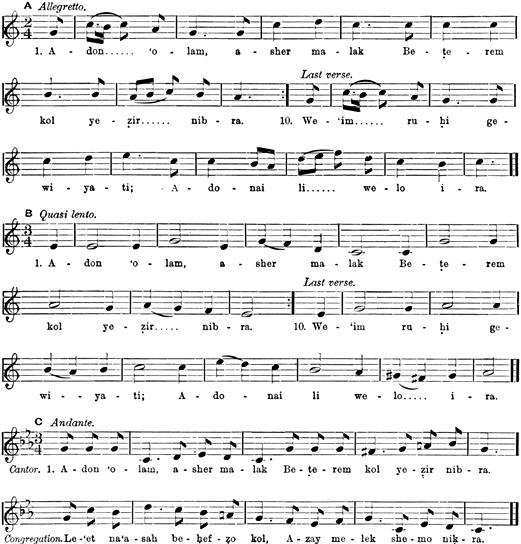
Adon Olam, with transliterated lyrics and melody, from the Jewish Encyclopedia.

Adon Olam (Hebrew: אֲדוֹן עוֹלָם, "Eternal Lord" or "Sovereign of the Universe") is a hymn in the Jewish liturgy. It has been a regular part of the daily and Shabbat (i.e., the biblical Sabbath) liturgy since the 15th century.

== Origin ==
Its authorship and origin are uncertain. It is sometimes attributed to Solomon ibn Gabirol (1021–1058 CE), who is known for his Hebrew poetry, but there is no solid evidence for this; the regular metric structure does not seem to accord with his other compositions. Warren Zev Harvey published a study presenting nine arguments supporting Ibn Gabriol's authoriship. In Etz Chaim, a Jewish liturgical work written in 1287 by Rabbi Jacob ben Judah Hazzan, the prayer "Adon Olam" is mentioned without reproducing its words, suggesting that the prayer was already familiar to worshippers. John Rayner, in his notes for Siddur Lev Chadash, suggests it was written in the thirteenth or fourteenth century in Spain, noting its absence from the prayer book Sefer Abudarham published c. 1340. It has also been attributed to Hai Gaon (939–1038) and as far back as the Talmudic sage Yohanan ben Zakkai. Although its diction indicates antiquity, it did not become part of the morning liturgy until the 15th century. Reuven Kimelman suggests Abraham ibn Ezra as the most likely candidate, based on the poem’s style and its first appearance in Western Europe.

== Text ==
The text of Adon Olam used in Ashkenazic liturgy contains five stanzas in 10 lines, as follows:

| English translation | Transliteration | Hebrew |
|---|---|---|
| Eternal master, who reigned supreme, Before any creation was created | Adon 'olam, 'asher malakh, b'ṭerem kol yeṣir niv'ra | אֲדוֹן עוֹלָם אֲשֶׁר מָלַךְ בְּטֶרֶם כָּל יְצִיר נִבְרָא |
| When it was finished according to his will, Then, "King" his name was proclaimed to be | L'et na'asa v'ḥefṣo kol, Azai melekh sh'mo niqra | לְעֵת נַעֲשָׂה בְחֶפְצוֹ כֹּל אֲזַי מֶלֶךְ שְׁמוֹ נִקְרָא |
| When this our world shall be no more, In majesty he still shall reign, | V'aḥarey kikh'lot hakol L'vado yimlokh nora | וְאַחֲרֵי כִּכְלוֹת הַכֹּל לְבַדּוֹ יִמְלוֹךְ נוֹרָא |
| And he was, and he is, And he will be in glory. | V'hu hayah v'hu hoveh V'hu yih'yeh b'tif'arah | וְהוּא הָיָה וְהוּא הֹוֶה וְהוּא יִהְיֶה בְּתִפְאָרָה |
| Alone is he, there is no second, Without division or ally; | V'hu 'eḥad v'eyn sheyni L'ham'shil lo l'haḥbirah | וְהוּא אֶחָד וְאֵין שֵׁנִי לְהַמְשִׁיל לוֹ לְהַחְבִּירָה |
| Without beginning, without end, To him is the power and sovereignty | B'li reyshiyt b'li takh'liyt V'lo ha'oz v'hammis'rah | בְּלִי רֵאשִׁית בְּלִי תַכְלִית וְלוֹ הָעֹז וְהַמִּשְׂרָה |
| He is my God, my living redeemer Rock of my affliction in time of trouble | V'hu 'Eli v'ḥay go'ali v'ṣur ḥevli b'eit ṣarah | וְהוּא אֵלִי וְחַי גּוֹאֲלִי וְצוּר חֶבְלִי בְּעֵת צָרָה |
| He is my banner and refuge Filling my cup the day I call | V'hu nissi 'umanos li m'nat kosi b'yom 'eqra | וְהוּא נִסִּי וּמָנוֹס לִי מְנָת כּוֹסִי בְּיוֹם אֶקְרָא |
| Into his hand I commit my spirit When I sleep, and I awake | B'yado af'qid ruḥi b'et 'iyyshan v'a'ira | בְּיָדוֹ אַפְקִיד רוּחִי בְּעֵת אִישָׁן וְאָעִירָה |
| And with my spirit, my body The Lord is with me, I will not fear | v'im ruḥi g'viyyati Adonai li v'lo 'ira | וְעִם רוּחִי גְוִיָּתִי אֲדֹנָי לִי וְלֹא אִירָא |

There are varying texts in the Sephardic version containing added lines (two after line 6, one after line 8, and two after line 10). In some traditions, the hymn comprises six stanzas, but the fourth stanza (which can be seen as an amplification of the third) is omitted by Ashkenazi liturgists. In others, it has 15 lines; in yet others, it has 16 lines. It has 10 lines in the Koren Sefard siddur (page 14) and 12 lines in the De Sola Pool Spanish & Portuguese Book of Prayer (page 232). It has 15 lines in the Koren Mizrahi siddur (page 6), the Orot Sephardic Daily Siddur (page 12), and the Orot Sephardic Shabbat Siddur (page 244). Morris Silverman considers the Ashkenazic version, which is the shortest, as the probable original version. It is strictly metrical, written in lines of eight syllables; more precisely, each line is composed of two segments of one yated and two tenu'ot, which indeed makes eight syllables.

== Practice ==
Adon Olam is one of the most familiar hymns in the whole of the Jewish liturgy and is sung in many communities at the end of the Mussaf for Shabbat and Jewish holidays. In the Roman Machzor, it is placed at the end of Shabbat services and sung together with Yigdal.

According to Seligman Baer, the hymn seems to have been intended to be recited before going to sleep, as it closes with the words: "Into His hand I commit my spirit when I fall asleep, and I shall awake." There is a tradition of reciting it each night at bedtime, and also on the deathbed. It may be, however, that the beauty and grandeur of the hymn recommended its use in the liturgy, and that it was chanted indiscriminately at the beginning or the close of the service.

According to the custom of the Sephardim and in British synagogues generally, the congregation sings it at the close of Shacharit on Shabbatot and festivals. Among Ashkenazi Jews it sometimes, takes the place of Yigdal at the close of the Maariv service on these occasions, while both hymns are sometimes chanted on the eve of Yom Kippur (Kol Nidre).

In the German rite, it is recited daily at the beginning of morning services.

Because of this solemn association and its opening and closing sentiments, the hymn has also been selected for (tuneless) reading in the chamber of the dying. In some congregations, it is recited (subdued and tuneless) in the synagogue to report a death in the community. It is likewise recited or chanted at the commencement of the daily early morning prayer, that its utterance may help to attune the mind of the worshiper to reverential awe. When it is sung at the end of the service, the congregation sits while singing it, as a demonstration that they are not eager to leave the house of prayer but are willing to stay and continue praying (by starting again at the beginning of the day's prayers).

The 16th Century work, Matteh Moshe, records a tradition that reciting Adon Olam with proper concentration helps ensure that one's prayers are accepted.

== Tunes ==
For so widespread and beloved a hymn, the traditional tunes are unusually few. Only four or five of them deserve to be called traditional. Of these the oldest appears to be a short melody of Spanish origin. The most common tune is attributed to the Russian cantor Eliezer Mordecai Gerovitsch, who published it in 1897 with the notation A.W. (alte Weise – “old form”), suggesting that it is an arrangement of an existing tune.

Of similar construction is a melody of northern origin associated by English Jews with the penitential season.

This melody is sometimes sung antiphonally, between Chazan and congregation, like the Spanish tune given above it. The best known of the other traditional antiphonal settings exists in two or three forms, the oldest of which appears to be the one given below (C).

The most common tune is attributed to the Russian cantor Eliezer Mordecai Gerovitsch. Every one of the synagogal composers of the 19th century has written several settings for "Adon Olam". Most of them—following the earlier practise of the continental synagogues during the modern period (see Choir)—have attempted more or less elaborately polyphonic compositions. But the absurdity of treating an essentially congregational hymn so as to render congregational singing of it impossible is latterly becoming recognized, and many tunes in true hymn form have been more recently composed. The setting written by Simon W. Waley (1827–1876) for the West London Synagogue has become a classic among the British Jews, having been long ago adopted from the "reform" into the "orthodox" congregations, of England and its colonies.

This song is often sung to many different tunes on account of its meter (iambic tetrameter). Many synagogues like to use "seasonal" tunes; for instance, on the Shabbat before Hanukkah, they might do it to Ma'oz Tzur. In Hebrew schools and Jewish summer camps, the Adon Olam hymn is sometimes set, for fun, to secular tunes like "Yankee Doodle" or "Jamaica Farewell".

In 1976, Uzi Hitman created a more upbeat tune for the 8th Annual Hasidic Song Festival, which has become the most popular version in Israel when sung outside traditional liturgical settings.

== Translations ==
Throughout the years there have been several English translations which preserve the original Hebrew meter and rhyming pattern, allowing the hymn to be sung to the same tunes as the original. A rhythmic English version in the book Prayers, Psalms and Hymns for the Use of Jewish Children of 1905 only loosely follows the Hebrew text.

Lord of the Universe, who made
The world and every living thing,
When first all earth His will obeyed,
Then was His name proclaimed as King.

And at the end of days will He,
To whom nor change nor time is known,
Who was, and is, and still will be,
In endless glory reign alone.

He is the King of kings, and none
Can share His wisdom, power and might;
The Lord our God, the Lord is One,
In love and mercy infinite.

My God and my Redeemer He,
My Rock in sorrow's darkest day;
A Help and Refuge unto me,
My Portion sure, my Shield and Stay.

My soul unto His care divine
Do I commend; I will not fear:
My body with it I resign,
Waking or sleeping, God is near.

A rhythmic English version which adheres much more closely to the Hebrew text is attributed to Frederick de Sola Mendes; it appears in the entry Adon Olam in The Jewish Encyclopedia of 1906 and in the Union Hymnal of 1914.

The Lord of all, who reigned supreme
Ere first creation's form was framed;
When all was finished by His will
His name Almighty was proclaimed.

When this, our world, shall be no more,
In majesty He still shall reign,
Who was, Who is, Who will for aye
In endless glory still remain.

Alone is He, beyond compare,
Without division or ally,
Without initial date or end,
Omnipotent He rules on high.

He is my God, my Saviour He,
To whom I turn in sorrow's hour--
My banner proud, my refuge sure--
Who hears and answers with His power.

Then in His hand myself I lay,
And trusting sleep, and wake with cheer;
My soul and body are His care;
The Lord doth guard, I have no fear.

Two 21st-century rhythmic translations appear to take inspiration from the above works: the rhythmic translation in the Koren Sacks Siddur of 2009 quotes heavily from the initial stanzas of the version in Prayers, Psalms and Hymns for the Use of Jewish Children; the unsigned rhythmic translation in the machzor Mishkan HaNefesh of 2015 has a few verses which echo the version of de Sola Mendes.
