= Myer Lyon =

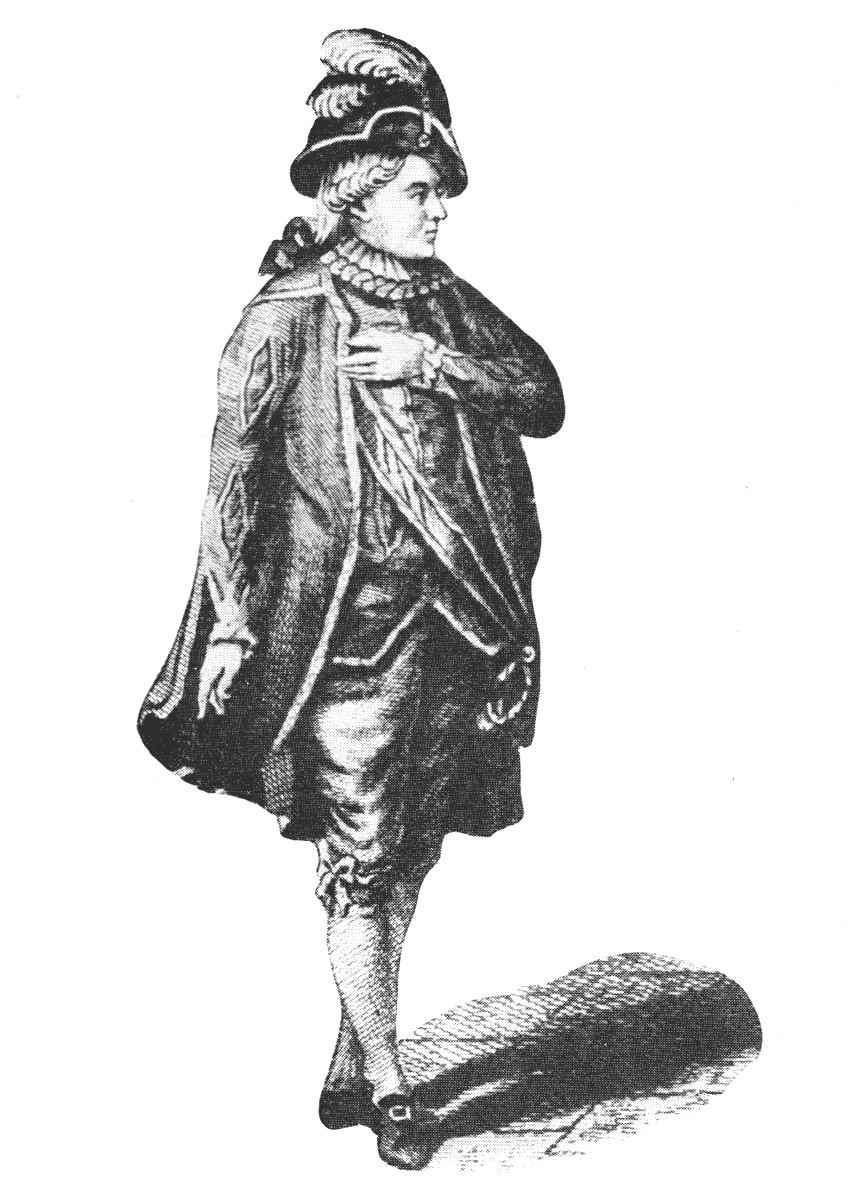
Myer Lyon (Leoni) in the role of Carlos in Sheridan's The Duenna.

Myer Lyon (c. 1750, Germany – 1797, Kingston, Jamaica), better known by his stage name Michael Leoni, was a hazzan at the Great Synagogue of London who achieved fame as a tenor opera singer in London and Dublin, and as the mentor of the singer John Braham.

== Origins and early career ==
Myer Lyon was appointed meshorrer (choirboy) to Isaac Polack, hazzan at the Great Synagogue, London, in 1767 'at a salary of £40 per annum, on the understanding that he was to behave as a Yehudi Kasher (i.e. an observant Jew)'. Lyon's origins remain unclear. According to the memoirs of the actor James de Castro he was born in Frankfurt-on-Main and was invited to London by 'the German Jews', where 'a very rich Jew, Mr. Franks, instantly patronised him'. His voice having been brought to the attention of the aristocracy and the actor David Garrick, he was given permission by the synagogue elders to appear on stage (where he adopted the name Michael Leoni), after which he returned to the synagogue and developed thenceforth a dual career.

It is difficult, however, to reconcile this narrative with his known dates. The first record of him is in October 1760 where Garrick refers to him as 'ye boy Leoni' – he sang a role in Garrick's The Enchanter at Drury Lane Theatre which was 'received with great applause'. This suggests that Leoni could not yet have been in his teens at this time, and that therefore the story of his being summoned to London cannot be true. In fact it would be surprising if it were true since there is no evidence that the congregation there had any concerns about musical standards. The fact that the synagogue was only too happy to dock Leoni's pay by £8 a year in 1772, due to its financial problems, also argues against the congregation's supposed dedication to its cantor. It is therefore rather more likely that, wherever he was born, he lived in London from an early age and was talent-spotted, perhaps by Polack, in the synagogue (much as Leoni was later to train his own nephew, John Braham).

== Major roles ==
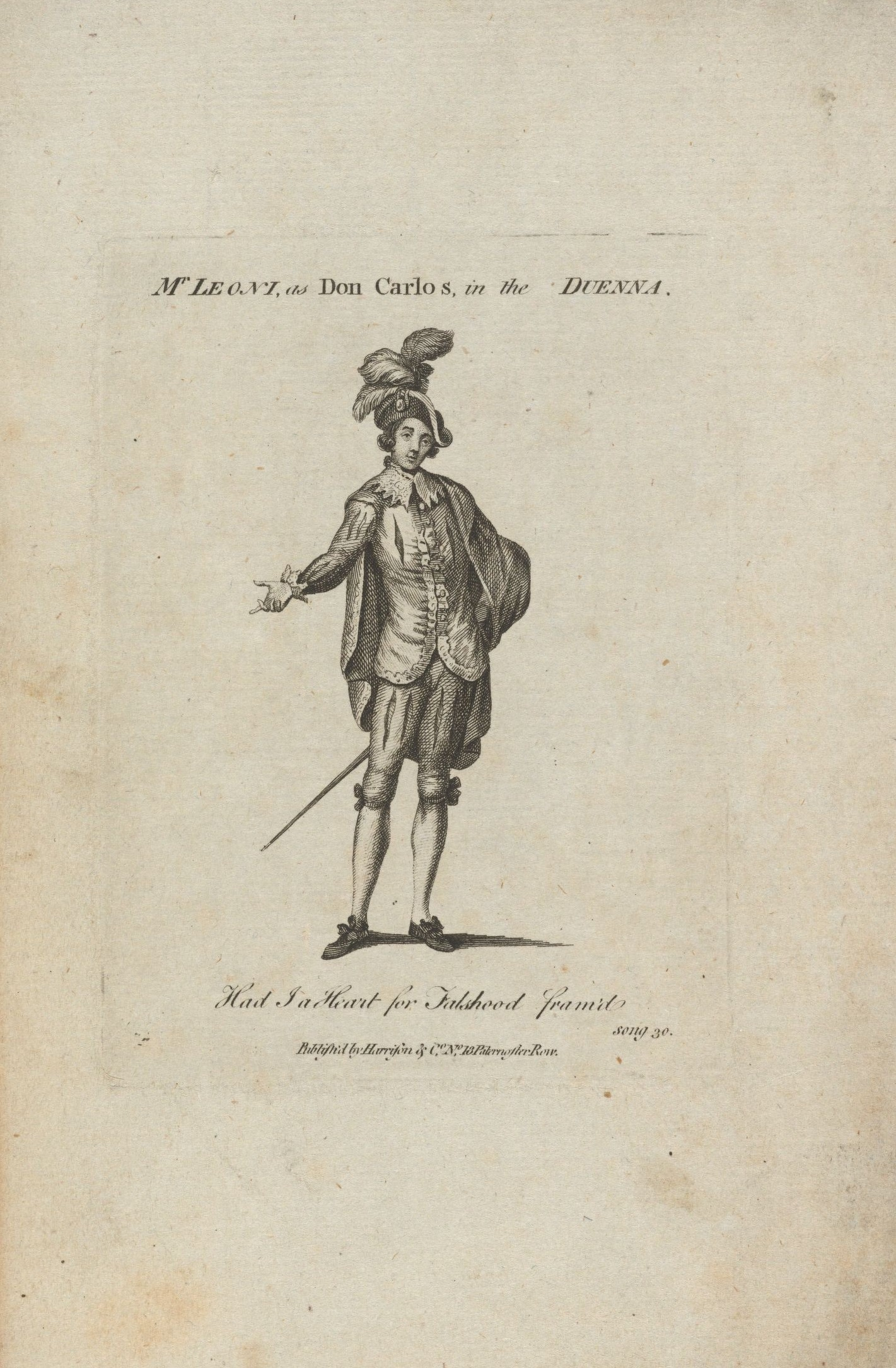
As Don Carlos in The Duenna, circa 1775

Leoni's twin-tracking in the synagogue and the theatre continued for some while. Between 1770 and 1782 he appeared quite frequently on the stage in London, where he scored great successes in Thomas Arne's Artaxerxes (1775) and, in the same year, as Carlos in Richard Brinsley Sheridan's The Duenna at the Covent Garden Theatre. The Morning Chronicle commented in its notice of The Duenna that 'it can never be performed on a Friday, on account of Leoni's engagement with the Synagogue', an indication of how crucial Leoni was to the piece's success.

== Leoni's version of Yigdal ==
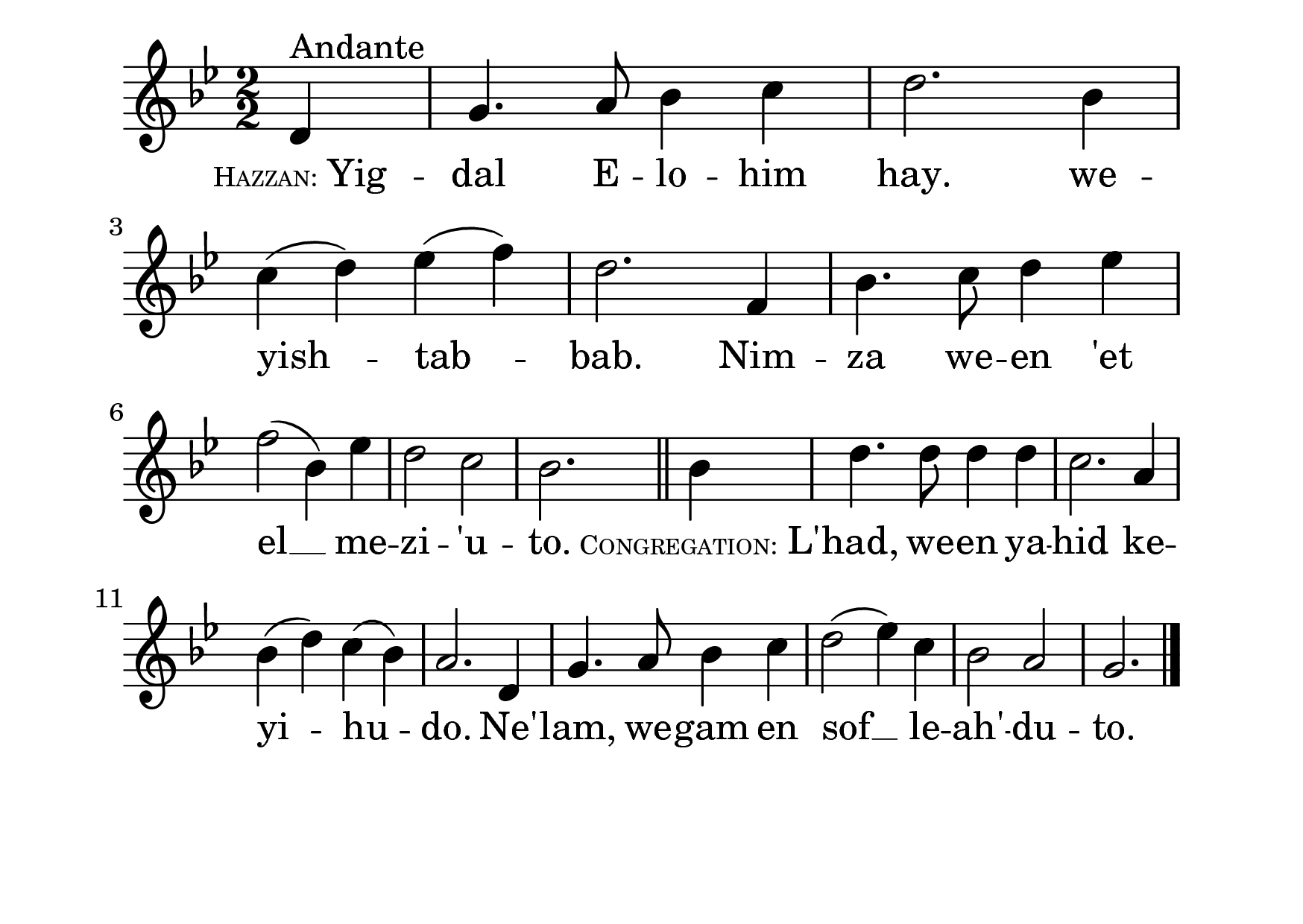
Myer Lyon's version of the Yigdal hymn

Leoni also developed admirers amongst Non-conformist Christians. His reputation encouraged a number of Gentiles, including in 1770 the Methodist Thomas Olivers, to come to the Great Synagogue on Friday nights to hear him. Olivers was so impressed by Leoni's moving rendition of the hymn Yigdal that he determined to write words for a church hymn using the melody. The result was the hymn The God of Abraham Praise, which has had great popularity ever since. In the standard Church of England hymnal, Hymns Ancient and Modern, the tune of The God of Abraham Praise is still titled Leoni, after its source.

== Society singer ==
Leoni's fame and talents turned out to be valuable in social terms to his congregation. Its wealthier members had taken to purchasing estates on the outskirts of London where they could live fashionable lives and hold soirées to which polite society could be invited. Integral to these was the quality of the entertainments provided, and Leoni was a star of appropriate calibre. In November 1774 he sang at the house in Isleworth of Aaron Franks, who was married to the daughter of another Jewish magnate, Moses Hart. The writer Horace Walpole was in the audience and gave a description which confirms the unusual qualities of Leoni's voice:

I was at a very fine concert at old Franks at Isleworth, and heard Leoni, who pleased me more than anything I have heard these hundred years. There is a full melancholy melody in his voice, though a falsetto, that nothing but a natural voice almost ever compasses. Then he sang songs of Handel in a genuine simple style, and did not put one in pain like the rope- dancers.

== Opera promoter ==
Eventually in 1783 Leoni's success and his limited remuneration at the synagogue led him to change his career and chance his arm as an opera promoter as well as a performer. A rumour spread that Leoni was eventually dismissed by the synagogue for performing in Handel's Messiah, but the rumour remains unsubstantiated. He chose for his venture Dublin, where he had appeared in 1781. Leoni's 1783 season, undertaken jointly with the composer Giordani, proved, however, to be an utter disaster, and some newspaper reviews remarked on the fading of his voice, although he can only have been in his mid-thirties at the most.

== Decline and emigration ==
Perhaps by this time audiences were beginning to tire of the unusual timbre which had first brought him popularity. From the financial consequences of this season Leoni never fully recovered. He appeared in 1787 in a benefit performance at Covent Garden Theatre (which was also the first stage appearance of John Braham), and had his last London benefit in 1788.

After this he sailed to Jamaica to become hazzan to the Jewish community in Kingston, where he died in 1797. He is buried at the old Jewish cemetery in Elletson Road, Kingston.

The inscription on his tombstone reads [in Hebrew] "The Great Singer, Myer, the son of Judah, the faithful Kazan of our Congregation. He died and was buried with a good name on a Sunday, the 5th day of Cheshvan, the year 5557." Followed on a second line by [in English] "Sacred to the memory of Mr. Michael Leoni, Principal Reader of our Congregation and one of the first singers of the age, who departed this life highly esteemed on Sunday the 6th day November, 1796, being the 5th day of the Jewish month of Chesvan, Anno Mundi 5557."

== Reputation ==
Clearly, however, his voice left a strong imprint amongst English music lovers. The satirist John Wilkins, in the year of Leoni's death, wrote:

'Neglected, appall’d, sickly poor and decay’d

See LEONI retiring in life’s humble shade.

‘Tis but few little years since the charm of his voice

Made theatres echo and thousands rejoice'.
