= Robert Wexler (disambiguation) =

Robert Wexler (born 1961) is an American politician.

Robert Wexler may also refer to:

- Robert Wexler (rabbi), American university president
- Robert Freeman Wexler (born 1961), American writer
