= Hakafot =

Jewish tradition

Hakafot (Hebrew: הַקָּפוֹת, lit. 'processions'; sing. hakafah, הַקָּפָה) are joyful processions in Judaism in which congregants walk circles around the synagogue's bimah (בִּימָה, 'pulpit' or 'platform'), especially on Simchat Torah—while dancing with the synagogue's Torah scrolls—and during Shacharit during Sukkot—while waving the four species. Performing hakafot is a minhag (מִהְהָג, 'tradition') in Judaism, not an obligation mandated by Halakha (Jewish law) or a mitzvah (מִצְוָה, 'commandments') given in the Tanakh itself. Conservative rabbi Reuven Hammer, in Or Hadash, his commentary on Siddur Sim Shalom for Shabbat and Festivals first published in 2003, hakafot—at least as they are recognized in contemporary Judaism—originated in Safed in the sixteenth century.

Hakafot symbolize communal harmony and the joy of learning Torah. Rabbi Bradley Shavit Artson, in a September 27, 2021, article published in the Jewish Journal, wrote: "We dance our Torahs in an act of gratitude, reaffirmation, and because we know in our bones that it is," referencing Proverbs 3:18, "'a tree of life to those who cling to it'." An account recorded in Joshua 6:3–20 describes the Israelites, led by Joshua, circumambulating the city of Jericho—a strategic walled city in ancient Canaan—once daily for six days. Each day, the priests (כֹּהנים, kōhănīm) carried the Ark of the Covenant, a sacred chest representing God's presence, as they led the procession around the city walls. On the seventh day, the Israelites marched around Jericho seven times. During the final procession, the priests blew their shofars (ram's horns), and the people shouted in unison. Miraculously, the walls of Jericho collapsed, allowing the Israelite soldiers to breach the city. During the era of the Second Temple in Jerusalem, when Jewish officials sought to expand the Temple Mount, they would first surround the proposed expansion area with temporary boundaries, then gradually extend the land outward to enlarge the sacred space, ensuring proper religious and political procedures were observed.

== On Sukkot ==
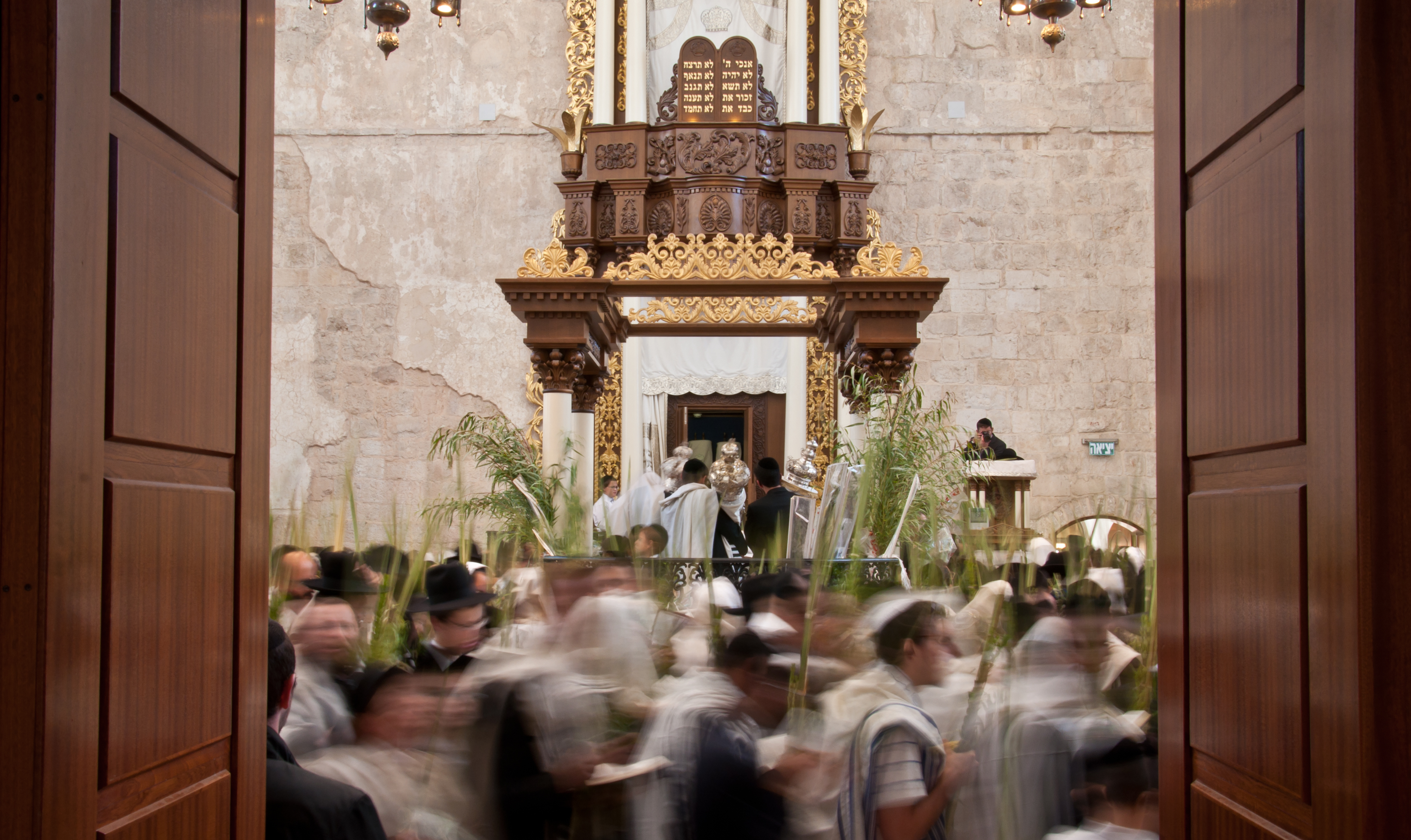
Hakafot in synagogue, with the four species, on Sukkot

During the Shacharit prayers on the first day of Sukkot and the five intermediate days when work is permitted (Chol HaMoed), a Torah scroll is taken from the Ark and held by one of the members of the congregation at the reader's platform. The other members of the congregation encircle the reader's platform once while holding the Four Species and sing the day's Hoshanot Piyyutim. Ashkenazi Jews have the custom of doing these Hakafot at the end of the Musaf prayers, while some Sefardi Jews have the custom of doing them before the Torah reading service. However, no Hakafot are done on Shabbat.

On Hoshana Raba—the seventh, and final, day of Chol HaMoed—the Torah scroll is taken out and encircled like the previous days, yet is done so seven times in accordance with the encirclement of Jericho by the People of Israel. Likewise, in addition to the special Hoshanot Piutyim for Hoshana Raba, the congregation also sings the Hoshanot Piutyim of the other days.

== On Simchat Torah ==
=== Custom ===
The custom of doing hakafot on Simchat Torah appears to have begun no earlier than the 15th century. From the times of the Rishonim (rabbis and poseks from the 11th to 15th centuries), a custom of taking the Torah scroll out on Hoshana Rabbah and Simchat Torah is recorded by the Maharil (Yaakov ben Moshe Levi Moelin), "the father of Ashkenazi custom":

Before taking out the Torah scroll, the reader says the line "You showed" (אתה הראת, atah ha'rattah), and the congregation answers with each verse. And when [the reader] reaches the line "The Torah shall come forth from Zion" (כי מציון תצא תורה, ki m'tsiohn tei'tsei Torah), the Torah is removed from the Ark.

The Rema (Moses Isserles), in the 16th century, records the custom of doing hakafot and the joy that accompanies the removal of the Torah scrolls from the Ark.

Though hakafot are now common in Israel communities, they were once resisted or not practiced in some Western European communities. Rabbi Shlomo Zalman Geiger notes in his book "Diveri Kohelet" (an important source for the customs of the Jewish community of Frankfurt), that the custom of Ashkenazi Jews was not to do Hakafot. He chastised whoever tried to do Hakafot, as was the custom of Poland. Likewise, the four communities of the "Provence Customs" did not accept the custom of Hakafot.

=== Order of Hakafot ===
Hakafot are held (in most communities) at night, at the end of the Maariv prayers and during the day in the Shacharit prayers, either before or after the Torah reading. Today, the practice is to extend the Hakafot of Simchat Torah and bring singing and dancing with the Torah scrolls throughout the synagogue. All of the Torah scrolls are taken from the Ark, and members of the congregation circle the reader's platform seven times or more as they carry the Torah scroll with them and say the Piuyt "God of the winds, save us now" (אלוהי הרוחות הושיע נא).

In every round of Hakafot, the reader, or another congregation member, walks at the front of the procession and reads verses of prayer arranged alphabetically along with the congregation. At the end of these verses, the congregation erupts in song and dance with the Torah scrolls. Children take part in Hakafot by carrying tiny Torah scrolls or special flags decorated with the symbols of the holiday, and adults entertain the children by dancing and holding the children on their shoulders. In the Diaspora, there is a custom to put an apple with a lit candle on the flag.

In some communities and the Hasidic world, there is a custom to observe "The Sixth Hakafa" in remembrance of the six million Jews who perished in the Holocaust. During this Hakafa, all the Torah scrolls are placed on the Bima and covered with a Talit (during "Second Hakafot" after the holiday, they also dim the lights of the synagogue), and the congregation sings a sad nigun. The Modzitz Hasidim sing the song "Ani Ma'amin" [I believe in the coming of the Messiah] of Azriel-David Fastig—a Modzitz Hasid who wrote the tune in a traincar on the way to Treblinka—which is closely identified with The Holocaust.

In Israel, Hakafot are held on the 22nd of Tishri (Shemini Atzeret) and in the Diaspora on the 23rd of Tishri (Simchat Torah). However, in some congregations in the Diaspora, there is a custom to do Hakafot both on Shemini Atzeret and Simchat Torah. This custom is accepted by some Hasidic communities (for example, the Chabad Hasidim) and some Sephardic communities. Yet some oppose this custom, fearing that it will belittle Second Day Yom Tov of the Diaspora.

=== Second Hakafot ===
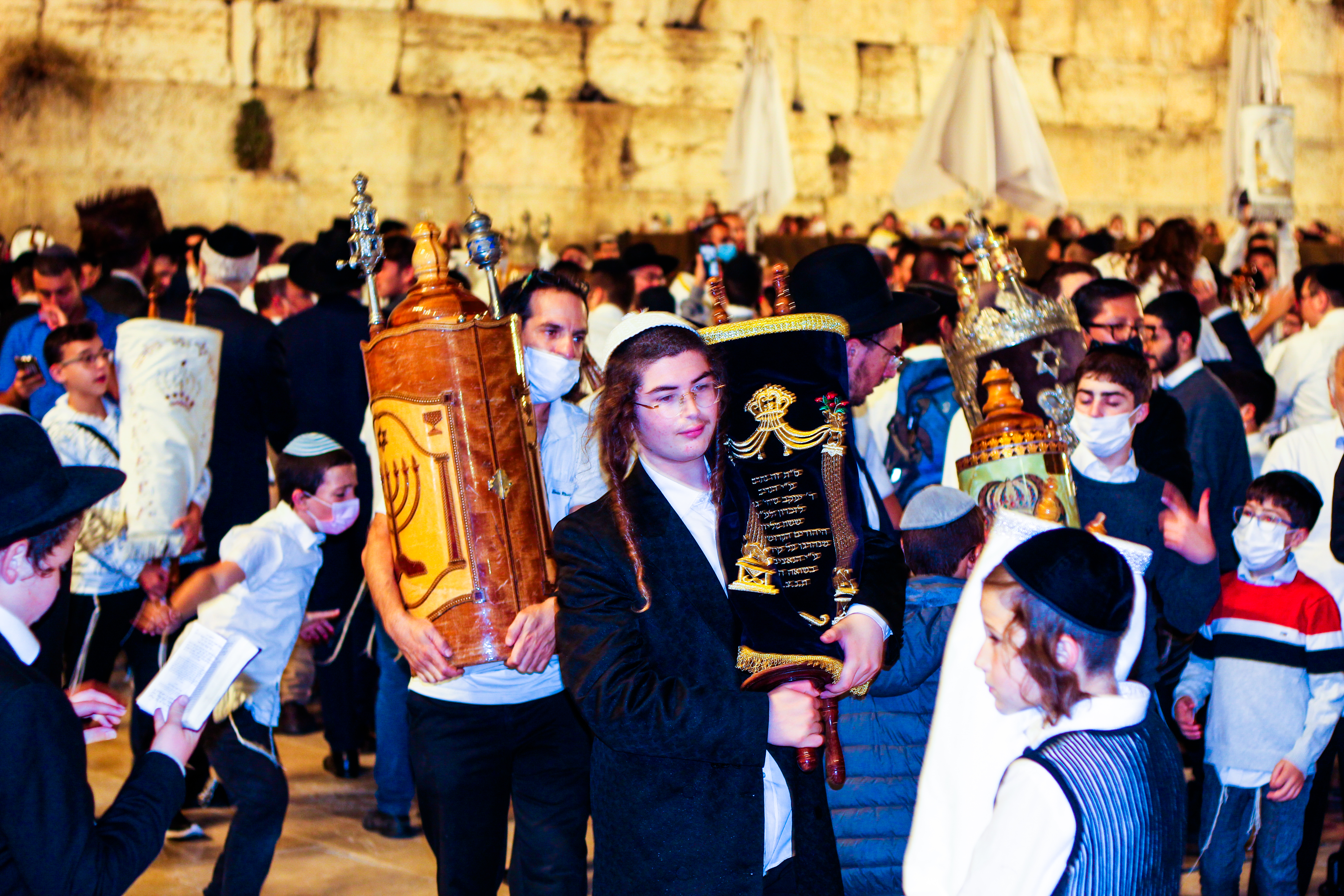
Second Hakafot after the Simchat Torah holiday at the Western Wall

At the conclusion of the holiday and the beginning of the Second Day Yom Tov of the Diaspora (Simchat Torah in the Diaspora), there is a custom in Israel to do Second Hakafot, during which people go into the streets with Torah scrolls and dance another time. The source of this custom is attributed to Rabbi Hayyim ben Joseph Vital, who described the customs of his teacher, Isaac Luria, in Safed. Vital explains that Luria had the custom to visit a number of synagogues after Simchat Torah, which delayed the end of the prayer services and did Hakafot. From there, the custom spread to Hebron and the Beit El Synagogue in Jerusalem, and subsequently spread to other congregations in Jerusalem before becoming accepted across Israel. The custom spread from Israel to communities in Italy and the Near East—Turkey, Baghdad, Persia, Kurdistan, and India.

Aside from Luria, additional reasons are recorded:

- A connection with the Diaspora, which was beginning celebration at the same time
- After the conclusion of the holiday, one is allowed to play instruments, and more people can participate in the celebration, upholding the idea that "with more people comes a greater blessing of God".
- A source for the custom today comes from Rabbi Frankel, a Rabbi in Tel Aviv during the British Mandate, who initiated Second Hakafot in Tel Aviv in 1942 at the conclusion of Simchat Torah in solidarity with the Jews of Europe who were destined for a great tragedy.
- At the end of the 1950s, people on Kibbutz Tirat Zvi began the custom of Second Hakafot to connect the irreligious kibbutzim with the experiences of their neighbors, and its successes caused Bnei Akiva branches in large cities to adopt the practice. After the Six-Day War and the changes within the religious-nationalist community, the custom spread across the country. It became a proposal of synagogues, community centers, Yeshivas, and community councils.

== Hakafot of the groom ==
In some Ashkenazic communities from Western Europe there is a custom that when a bride comes to the Chuppah, she circles the groom three or seven times, and afterward stands by his side. The earliest source for this custom comes in 1430 CE in the commentary of Rabbi Dosa HaYoni on the Torah, which notes that Austrian Jews had the custom of brides to circle three times. He attributes it to Jeremiah 31:21, which states, "Since God created new things in the world, woman shall encircle man." As time passed the custom changed to seven times in some communities, and the change may have resulted from the importance of the number seven in Kabbalah. As time passed other explanations for the custom's change—for example a symbol that just as the walls of Jericho that fell after Joshua and the people of Israel circled it seven times so too should the walls between spouses fall as well. An additional reason given is that Hakafot are a commemoration of the seven conditions of betrothal in the Book of Hosea symbolic of the engagement between God and Israel. Alternately, the custom remembers the three ways in Jewish law a marriage becomes binding: money, contract, and sexual intercourse. It is also possible that the custom was created with the influences of other cultures in the region.

== Hakafot of the Dead ==
In Mizrahi communities there used to be a custom among those who dealt with the dead to encircle the bed of a deceased person seven times before burial and to say verses of Psalms, like Psalm 90 and "May God who gives strength" [אנא בכח] as a way to ward off evil spirits. The custom came from Kabbalah, but today it is rarely practiced except for far-off places when an important person dies. This was also the practice of an older generation of Ashkenazi Jews, as well as the Perushim; that when family members died, they were treated like Rabbis and important community members.
