= Wexner =

Wexner is a surname. Notable people with the surname include:

- Les Wexner (born 1937), American businessman
- Steven D. Wexner (born 1957), American surgeon and physician

== See also ==
- Wexner Center for the Arts
- Wexler (surname)
