= Wexler (surname) =

Wexler is a surname of German and Yiddish origin. Notable people with the surname include:

== Arts and entertainment ==
=== Film and television ===
- David Wexler (director) (born 1983), American filmmaker
- Eleonora Wexler, Argentine actress
- Haskell Wexler (1922–2015), American cinematographer and director
- Jeff Wexler (1947–2025), American production sound mixer
- Norman Wexler (1926–1999), American screenwriter
- Paul Wexler (actor) (1929–1979), American actor
- Skyler Wexler, Canadian child actress
- Sy Wexler, American film maker
- Victor Raider-Wexler, actor

=== Other arts ===
- Aaron Wexler (born 1974), American artist
- Django Wexler, American fantasy writer
- Donald Wexler, American architect
- Elmer Wexler, American graphic designer
- Glen Wexler, American photographer
- Glenn Wexler, American contemporary artist
- Jerry Wexler (1917–2008), American music writer and producer
- Natalie Wexler, American novelist and historian
- Robert Freeman Wexler, American writer

== Government and politics ==
- Anne Wexler (1930–2009), American political advisor and lobbyist
- Max Wexler, Romanian Marxist activist
- Robert Wexler, American politician

== Other ==
- Bernardo Wexler (1925–1992), Argentine chess master
- David B. Wexler, American law professor
- Harry Wexler (1911–1962), American meteorologist
- Jacqueline Grennan Wexler (1926–2012), American academic administrator
- Jerrold Wexler (1924–1992), American businessman
- Joan Wexler (born 1946), American university dean
- Leonard D. Wexler (1924–2018), American jurist
- Nancy Wexler, American geneticist
- Paul Wexler (linguist), Israeli linguist
- Peter Wexler, British scholar
- Robert Wexler (rabbi), American rabbi and university president

== Fictional characters ==
- Ilana Wexler, character in the series Broad City
- Karen Wexler, character in the series General Hospital
- Kim Wexler, character in the series Better Call Saul
- Miriam Wexler, character in the film Turning Red
