= Reuven Hammer =

American rabbi, scholar, religious leader

- ראובן המר
- Born: June 30, 1933; Syracuse, New York, U.S.
- Died: August 12, 2019 (aged 86); Jerusalem, Israel
- Occupations: Rabbi, scholar, writer, lecturer

Reuven Hammer (Hebrew: ראובן המר; June 30, 1933 – August 12, 2019) was an American-Israeli Conservative rabbi, scholar of Jewish liturgy, author, and lecturer who was born in New York. He was a founder of the "Masorti" (Conservative) movement in Israel, led its beit din, and served as president of the International Rabbinical Assembly. A prolific writer in both the Israeli and international press, he was a regular columnist for The Jerusalem Post's "Tradition Today" column. He lived in Jerusalem.

== Biography ==
Hammer earned a doctorate in theology and rabbinical ordination from the Jewish Theological Seminary of America, as well as a Ph.D. from Northwestern University.

As president of the 1,500-member Rabbinical Assembly of the Conservative movement in Israel, Hammer authored the movement's official commentary on the prayer book, Or Hadash: A Commentary on Siddur Sim Shalom for Shabbat and Festivals, published in March 2003. The work contains the complete text of Siddur Sim Shalom for Shabbat and Jewish holidays, surrounded by a comprehensive commentary. The page layout loosely resembles that of the Talmud. In 2008, Rabbi Hammer also authored the commentary for Or Hadash: A Commentary on Siddur Sim Shalom for Weekdays.

From October 2005 to July 2007, Hammer was the interim rabbi at the New London Synagogue in London, England.

Hammer died of a brain tumour on 12 August 2019 in Jerusalem at the age of 86.

== Honors and awards ==
In 2003 Hammer was named to the Forward 50 as one of the most influential Jews in the American Jewish community for his achievements as president of the Rabbinical Assembly. That same year, he received the Simon Greenberg Award for Lifetime Achievement in the Rabbinate by the Ziegler School of Rabbinic Studies of the University of Judaism (now the American Jewish University).

His books Sifre: A Taanaitic commentary on the Book of Deuteronomy (1986) and Entering the High Holy Days: A guide to origins, themes, and prayers (2005) were awarded the National Jewish Book Award as the best book of scholarship for their respective years.

== Bibliography ==
- The Other Child in Jewish Education: A handbook on learning disabilities. United Synagogue Commission on Jewish Education. 1979.
- Sifre: A Tannaitic commentary on the Book of Deuteronomy. Yale University Press. 1986. ISBN 0-300-03345-1.
- Entering Jewish Prayer: A guide to personal devotion and the worship service. Schocken Books. 1995. ISBN 0-8052-1022-9.
- The Classic Midrash: Tannaitic Commentaries on the Bible. Paulist Press. 1995. ISBN 978-0-8091-3503-5. "reuven hammer."
- The Jerusalem Anthology: A literary guide. Jewish Publication Society. 1995. ISBN 0-8276-0551-X. "reuven hammer."
- Or Hadash: A Commentary on Siddur Sim Shalom for Shabbat and Festivals. Rabbinical Assembly. 2003. ISBN 0-916219-20-8.
- Entering the High Holy Days: A guide to origins, themes, and prayers. Jewish Publication Society of America. 2005. ISBN 0-8276-0821-7.
- Or Ḥadash: A commentary on Sidur Sim Shalom for Weekdays. Rabbinical Assembly. 2008. ISBN 978-0-916219-38-3. (with Jules Harlow, Harold Kushner, and Avram Israel Reisner)
- Entering Torah: Prefaces to the weekly Torah portion. Gefen Publishing House. 2009. ISBN 978-965-229-434-0.
- The Torah Revolution:Fourteen Truths That Changed The World. Jewish Lights Publishing. 2011. ISBN 978-1-58023-457-3.
- Akiva: Life, Legend, Legacy. University of Nebraska Press. 2015. ISBN 9780827612488.
- עקיבא: האיש, האגדה, המורשת. מכון שכטר ללימודי היהדות. 2017. ISBN 9789655644210.
- A Year with the Sages: Wisdom on the Weekly Torah Portion. University of Nebraska Press. 2019. ISBN 9780827613119.

== See also ==
- Conservative and Masorti rabbis
