= Jewish prayer =

Observance of recitation in religious Judaism

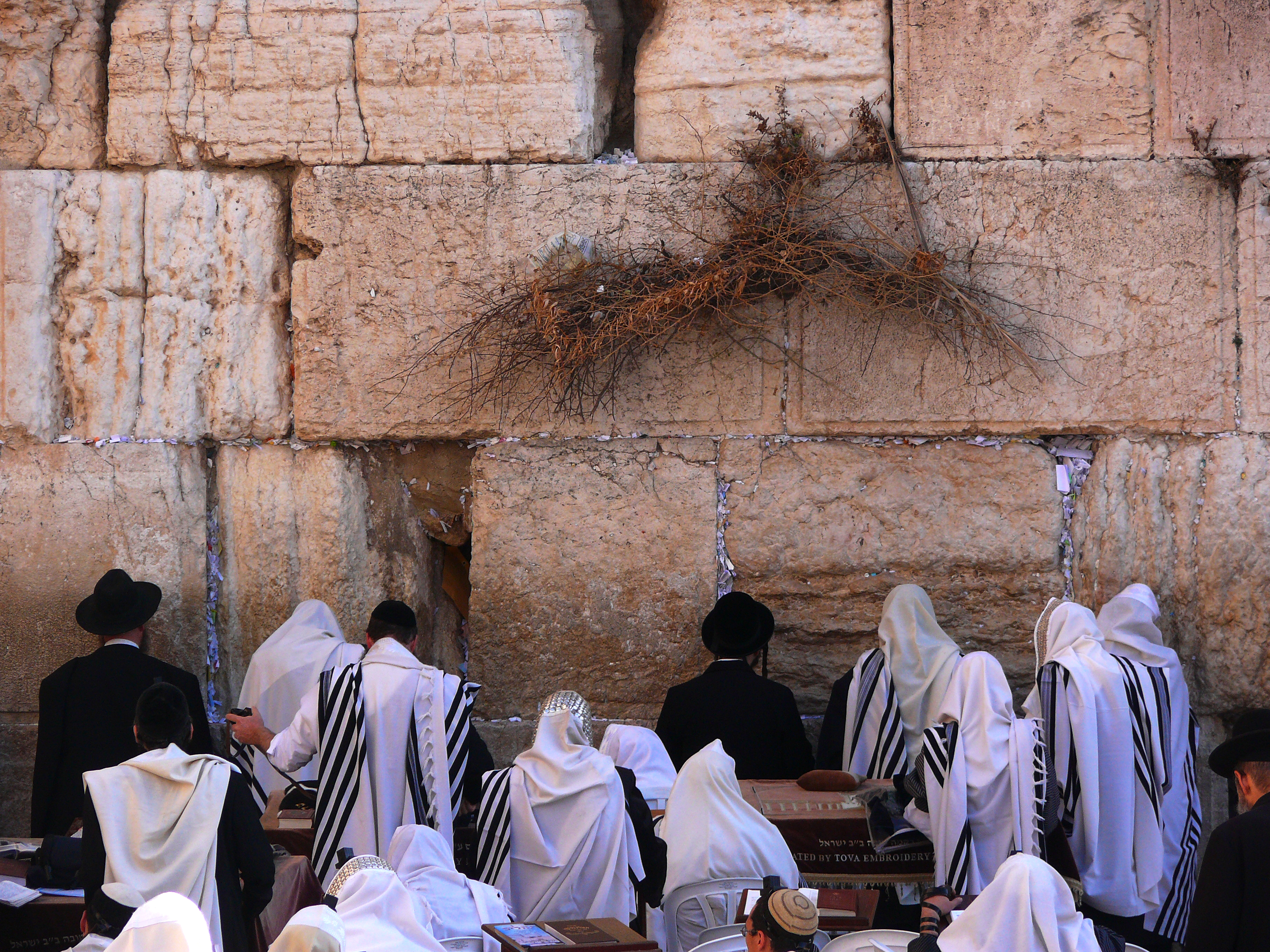
Jews praying at the Western Wall (Kotel) in Jerusalem, 2010

Video-clips of Jews praying, from the archive of the Israeli News Company of Israel's Channel 2

Jewish prayer (Hebrew: תְּפִילָּה, tefilla [tfiˈla]; plural תְּפִילּוֹת tefillot [tfiˈlot]; Yiddish: תּפֿלה, romanized: tfile [ˈtfɪlə], plural תּפֿלות tfilles [ˈtfɪləs]; Yinglish: davening /ˈdɑːvənɪŋ/ from Yiddish דאַוון davn 'pray') is the prayer recitation that forms part of the observance of Rabbinic Judaism. These prayers, often with instructions and commentary, are found in the Siddur, the traditional Jewish prayer book.

Prayer, as a "service of the heart," is in principle a Torah-based commandment. It is mandatory for Jewish women and men. However, the rabbinic requirement to recite a specific prayer text does differentiate between men and women: Jewish men are obligated to recite three prayers each day within specific time ranges (zmanim), while, according to many approaches, women are only required to pray once or twice a day, and may not be required to recite a specific text.

Traditionally, three prayer services are recited daily:

- Morning prayer: Shacharit or Shaharit (שַחֲרִית, šaḥarīt "of the dawn")
- Afternoon prayer: Mincha or Minha (מִנְחָה minḥā), named for the flour offering that accompanied sacrifices at the Temple in Jerusalem,
- Evening prayer: Arvit (עַרְבִית, ʿarbīt "of the evening") or Maariv (מַעֲרִיב, maʿarīb "bringing on night")

Two additional services are recited on Shabbat and holidays:

- Musaf (מוּסָף, "additional") are recited by Orthodox and Conservative congregations on Shabbat, major Jewish holidays (including Chol HaMoed), and Rosh Chodesh.
- Neʿila (נְעִילָה, "closing"), was traditionally recited on communal fast days and is now recited only on Yom Kippur.

A distinction is made between individual prayer and communal prayer, which requires a quorum known as a minyan, with communal prayer being preferable as it permits the inclusion of prayers that otherwise would be omitted.

According to tradition, many of the current standard prayers were composed by the sages of the Great Assembly in the early Second Temple period (516 BCE – 70 CE). The language of the prayers, while clearly from this period, often employs classical idiom. The main structure of the modern prayer service was fixed in the Tannaic era (1st–2nd centuries CE), with some additions and the exact text of blessings coming later. Jewish prayerbooks emerged during the early Middle Ages during the period of the Geonim of Babylonia (6th–11th centuries CE).

Over the last 2000 years, traditional variations have emerged among the traditional liturgical customs of different Jewish communities, such as Ashkenazic, Sephardic, Yemenite, Eretz Yisrael and others, or rather recent liturgical inventions such as Nusach Sefard and Nusach Ari. However the differences are minor compared with the commonalities. Much of the Jewish liturgy is sung or chanted with traditional melodies or trope. Synagogues may designate or employ a professional or lay hazzan (cantor) for the purpose of leading the congregation in prayer, especially on Shabbat or holy holidays.

== Origin and history ==
=== Scriptural origin ===
According to the Babylonian Talmud, prayer is a scriptural command:

You shall serve God with your whole heart' – What service is performed with the heart? This is prayer.

Based on this passage, Maimonides categorizes daily prayer as one of the 613 commandments. He rules that the commandment is fulfilled by any prayer at any time in the day, not a specific text; and thus is not time-dependent, and is mandatory for both Jewish men and women. In contrast, the requirement to say specific prayers at specific times is based not on scriptural law, but rather rabbinic decree.

=== The number of prayers per day ===
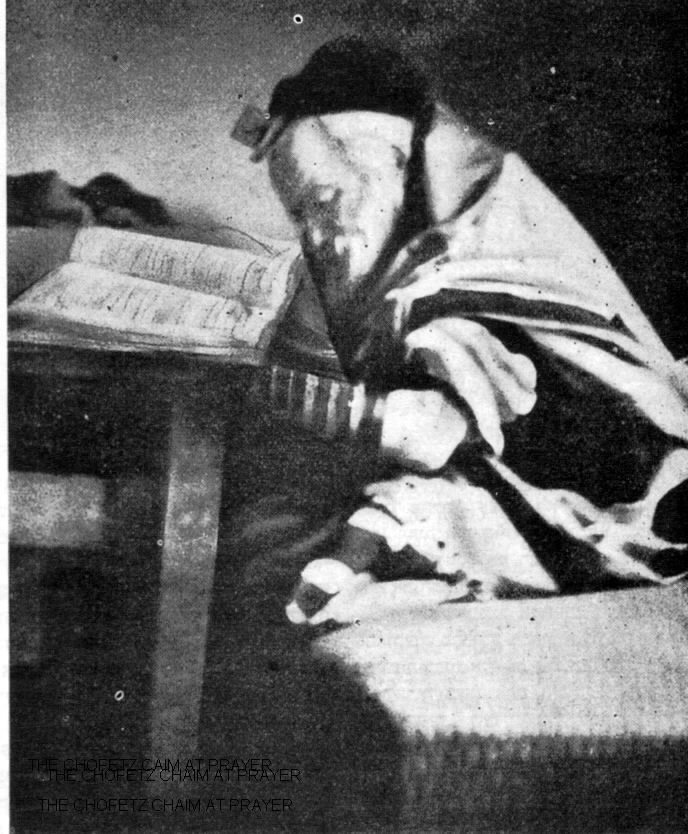
Rabbi Yisrael Meir HaCohen Kagan, the "Chofetz Chaim", at prayer towards the end of his life

Additional references in the Torah have been interpreted to suggest that King David and the prophet Daniel prayed three times a day. In Psalms, David states:

Evening, morning, and noontime, I speak and moan, and He hearkened to my voice.

And in the Book of Daniel:

And Daniel, when he knew that a writ had been inscribed, came to his house, where there were open windows in his upper chamber, opposite Jerusalem, and three times a day he kneeled on his knees and prayed and offered thanks before his God just as he had done prior to this.

The Talmud gives two reasons why there are three basic prayers each day:

1. Each service was instituted parallel to a sacrificial act in the Temple in Jerusalem: the morning Tamid offering, the afternoon Tamid offering, and the overnight burning of this last offering.
2. According to Rabbi Jose bar Hanina, each of the Patriarchs instituted one prayer: Abraham the morning, Isaac the afternoon and Jacob the evening prayers. This view is supported with scriptural quotes indicating that the Patriarchs prayed at the times mentioned. However, even according to this view, the exact times of when the services are held, and moreover the entire concept of a mussaf service, are still based on the sacrifices.

=== Development of the prayer text ===
The earliest parts of Jewish prayer are the Shema Yisrael and the Priestly Blessing, which are in the Torah.

Maimonides asserts that until the Babylonian exile, all Jews composed their own prayers. After the exile, however, when the exiles' understanding of Hebrew diminished and they found it difficult to compose prayers in Hebrew, Ezra and his court composed the Amidah prayer. Modern scholarship dating from the Wissenschaft des Judentums movement of 19th-century Germany, as well as textual analysis influenced by the 20th-century discovery of the Dead Sea Scrolls, suggests that dating from the Second Temple period there existed "liturgical formulations of a communal nature designated for particular occasions and conducted in a centre totally independent of Jerusalem and the Temple, making use of terminology and concepts that were later to become dominant in Jewish prayer."

The structure of the modern Jewish prayer service was established during the period of the Tannaim, "from their traditions, later committed to writing, we learn that the generation of rabbis active at the time of the destruction of the Second Temple (70 CE) gave Jewish prayer its structure and, in outline form at least, its contents." This liturgy included the twice-daily recitation of the Shema, the Amidah, and the cycle of public Torah reading.

The Amidah (or Shemoneh Esreh) prayer is traditionally ascribed to the Great Assembly (in the time of Ezra, near the end of the scriptural period), though other sources suggest it was established by Simeon HaPakoli in the late 1st century. Even in the 1st century, though, the precise wording of the blessings was not yet fixed, and varied from locale to locale. By the Middle Ages the texts of the blessings was nearly fixed, and in the form in which they are still used today.

Readings from the Torah (five books of Moses) and the Nevi'im ("Prophets") are specified in the Mishnah and Talmud, as are the order of blessings surrounding the Shema. Other parts of the service, such as Pesukei dezimra, have little mention in early sources, but became established by custom.

The oldest prayer books date from the time of the Geonim of Babylonia; "some were composed by respected rabbinic scholars at the request of far-flung communities seeking an authoritative text of the required prayers for daily use, Shabbat, and holidays." The earliest existing codification of the prayerbook was drawn up by Rav Amram Gaon of Sura, Babylon, about 850 CE. Half a century later Rav Saadia Gaon, also of Sura, composed a siddur, in which the rubrical matter is in Arabic. These were the basis of Simcha ben Samuel's Machzor Vitry (11th-century France), which was based on the ideas of his teacher, Rashi. Another formulation of the prayers was that appended by Maimonides to the laws of prayer in his Mishneh Torah: this forms the basis of the Yemenite liturgy, and has had some influence on other rites. From this point forward, all Jewish prayerbooks had the same basic order and contents.

The siddur was printed by Soncino in Italy as early as 1486, though a siddur was first mass-distributed only in 1865. The siddur began appearing in the vernacular as early as 1538. The first English translation, by Gamaliel ben Pedahzur (a pseudonym), appeared in London in 1738; a different translation was released in the United States in 1837.

Over the last 2000 years, the various branches of Judaism have resulted in small variations in the Rabbinic liturgy customs among different Jewish communities, with each community having a slightly different nusach (customary liturgy). The principal difference is between Ashkenazic and Sephardic customs, although there are other communities (e.g., Yemenite and Italian Jews, and in the past Eretz Yisrael), and rather recent liturgical inventions such as Hassidic, Chabad and other communities also have distinct customs, variations, and special prayers. However, the differences between all these customs are quite minor compared with the commonalities. Reform Judaism also has its own version.

=== Text and language ===
According to halakha, all individual prayers and virtually all communal prayers may be said in any language that the person praying understands. For example, the Mishnah mentions that the Shema need not be said in Hebrew. A list of prayers that must be said in Hebrew is given in the Mishna, and among these only the Priestly Blessing is in use today, as the others are prayers that are to be said only in a Temple in Jerusalem, by a priest, or by a reigning King.

Despite this, the tradition of most Ashkenazi Orthodox synagogues is to use Hebrew for all except a small number of prayers, including Kaddish and Yekum Purkan in Aramaic, and Gott Fun Avraham, which was written in Yiddish. In other streams of Judaism there is considerable variability: Sephardic communities may use Ladino or Portuguese for many prayers, although usually only for added prayers and not for the established prayers; Conservative synagogues tend to use the local language to a varying degree; and at some Reform synagogues almost the whole service may be in the local language.

The language of the prayers, while clearly being from the Second Temple period, often employs classical idiom, and according to some authorities it should not contain rabbinic or Mishnaic idiom apart from in the sections of Mishnah that are featured.

=== Direction of prayers ===
The Talmud (Berakhot:30a) cites the prayer recited by the king at the dedication of Solomon's Temple (1 Kings 8) in ruling that the Amidah is recited facing towards Israel by those outside it, while those reciting the prayer in Israel face Jerusalem and those in Jerusalem face towards the site of the Holy of Holies on the Temple Mount.

== Denominational variations ==
Conservative services generally use the same basic format for services as Orthodox Judaism, with some doctrinal leniencies and some prayers in English. In practice, there is wide variation among Conservative congregations. In traditionalist congregations the liturgy can be almost identical to that of Orthodox Judaism, almost entirely in Hebrew (and Aramaic), with a few minor exceptions, including excision of a study session on Temple sacrifices, and modifications of prayers for the restoration of the sacrificial system. In more liberal Conservative synagogues there are greater changes to the service, with up to a third of the service in English; abbreviation or omission of many of the preparatory prayers; and replacement of some traditional prayers with more contemporary forms. There are some changes for doctrinal reasons, including egalitarian language, fewer references to restoring sacrifices in the Temple in Jerusalem, and an option to eliminate special roles for Kohanim and Levites.

The liturgies of Reform and Reconstructionist are based on traditional elements, but contain language more reflective of liberal belief than the traditional liturgy. Doctrinal revisions generally include revising or omitting references to traditional doctrines such as bodily resurrection, a Messiah, and other elements of traditional Jewish eschatology, Divine revelation of the Torah at Mount Sinai, angels, conceptions of reward and punishment, and other personal miraculous and supernatural elements. Services are often from 40% to 90% in the vernacular.

Reform Judaism has made greater alterations to the traditional service in accord with its more liberal theology including dropping references to traditional elements of Jewish eschatology such as a Messiah, a bodily resurrection of the dead, and others. The Hebrew portion of the service is substantially abbreviated and modernized and modern prayers substituted for traditional ones. In addition, in keeping with their view that the laws of Shabbat (including a traditional prohibition on playing instruments) are inapplicable to modern circumstances, Reform services often play instrumental or recorded music with prayers on the Sabbath. All Reform synagogues are Egalitarian with respect to gender roles.

== Philosophy of prayer ==
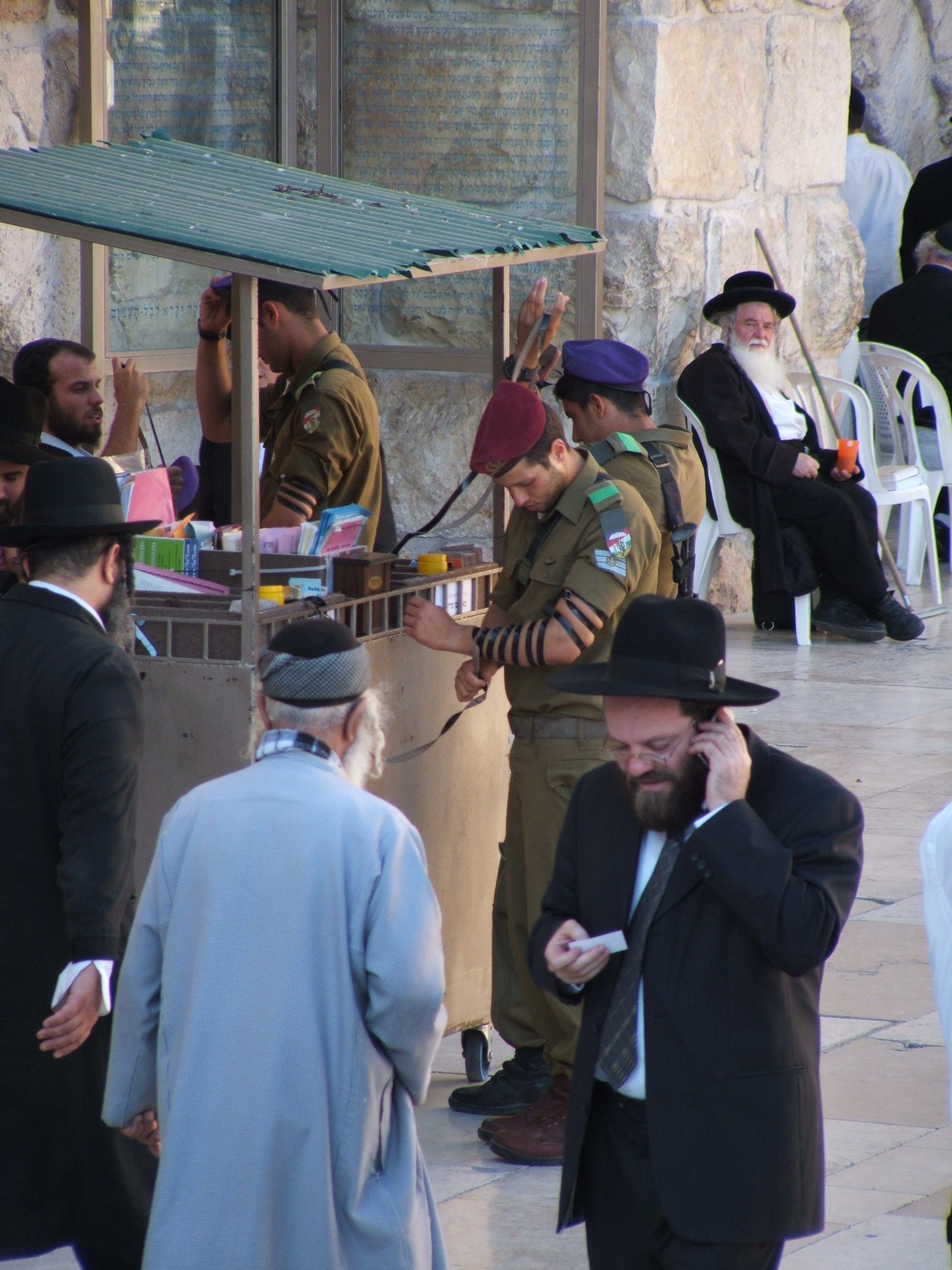
An Israeli soldier lays tefillin at the Western Wall prior to prayer.

In Jewish philosophy and in Rabbinic literature, it is noted that the Hebrew verb for prayer—hitpallel (התפלל)—is in fact the reflexive form of palal (פלל), to judge. Thus, "to pray" conveys the notion of "judging oneself": (Note: This interpretation is homiletic rather than scholarly, as it is historically more likely that the root meaning of hitpallel is "to seek judgement for oneself", in other words to present a legal pleading.) ultimately, the purpose of prayer—tefillah (תפלה)—is to transform oneself.

This etymology is consistent with the Jewish conception of divine simplicity. It is not God that changes through one's prayer—man does not influence God as a defendant influences a human judge who has emotions and is subject to change—rather it is man himself who is changed. It is further consistent with Maimonides' view on Divine Providence. Here, Tefillah is the medium which God gave to man by means of which he can change himself, and thereby establish a new relationship with God—and thus a new destiny for himself in life; see also under Psalms.

=== Kabbalistic view ===
Kabbalah (esoteric Jewish mysticism) uses a series of kavanot, directions of intent, to specify the path the prayer ascends in the dialogue with God, to increase its chances of being answered favorably. Kabbalism ascribes a higher meaning to the purpose of prayer, which is no less than affecting the very fabric of reality itself, restructuring and repairing the universe in a real fashion. In this view, every word of every prayer, and indeed, even every letter of every word, has a precise meaning and a precise effect. Prayers thus literally affect the mystical forces of the universe, and repair the fabric of creation.

This approach has been taken by the Chassidei Ashkenaz (German pietists of the Middle-Ages), the Zohar, the Arizal's Kabbalist tradition, the Ramchal, most of Hassidism, the Vilna Gaon and Jacob Emden.

Hassidism, although incorporating the kabbalistic worldview and its corresponding kavanot, also emphasized straightforward sincerity and depth of emotional engagement in prayer. The Baal Shem Tov's great-grandson, Rebbe Nachman of Breslov, particularly emphasized speaking to God in one's own words, which he called Hitbodedut (self-seclusion) and advised setting aside an hour to do this every day.

== Methodology and terminology ==
=== Terms for praying ===
Daven is the originally exclusively Eastern Yiddish verb meaning "pray"; it is widely used by Ashkenazic Orthodox Jews. In Yinglish, this has become the Anglicised davening.

The origin of the word is obscure, but is thought by some to have come from Arabic (from diwan, a collection of poems or prayers), French (from devoner, 'to devote' or 'dedicate' or possibly from the French 'devant'- 'in front of' with the idea that the person praying is mindful of before whom they stand), Latin (from divin, 'divine') or even English (from dawn). Others believe that it derives from a Slavic word meaning "to give" (Russian: давать, romanized: davat'). Some claim that it originates from an Aramaic word, de'avuhon or d'avinun, meaning 'of their/our forefathers', as the three prayers are said to have been invented by Abraham, Isaac and Jacob. Another Aramaic derivation, proposed by Avigdor Chaikin, cites the Talmudic phrase, "ka davai lamizrach", 'gazing wistfully to the east'. Kevin A. Brook cited Zeiden's suggestion that the word daven comes from the Turkic root tabun- meaning 'to pray', and that in Kipchak Turkic, the initial t morphs into d, but also cited Beider's opinion that Zeiden's etymology is unlikely.

In Western Yiddish, the term for pray is oren, a word with clear roots in Romance languages, similar to Spanish and Portuguese orar and Latin orare.

=== Minyan (quorum) ===
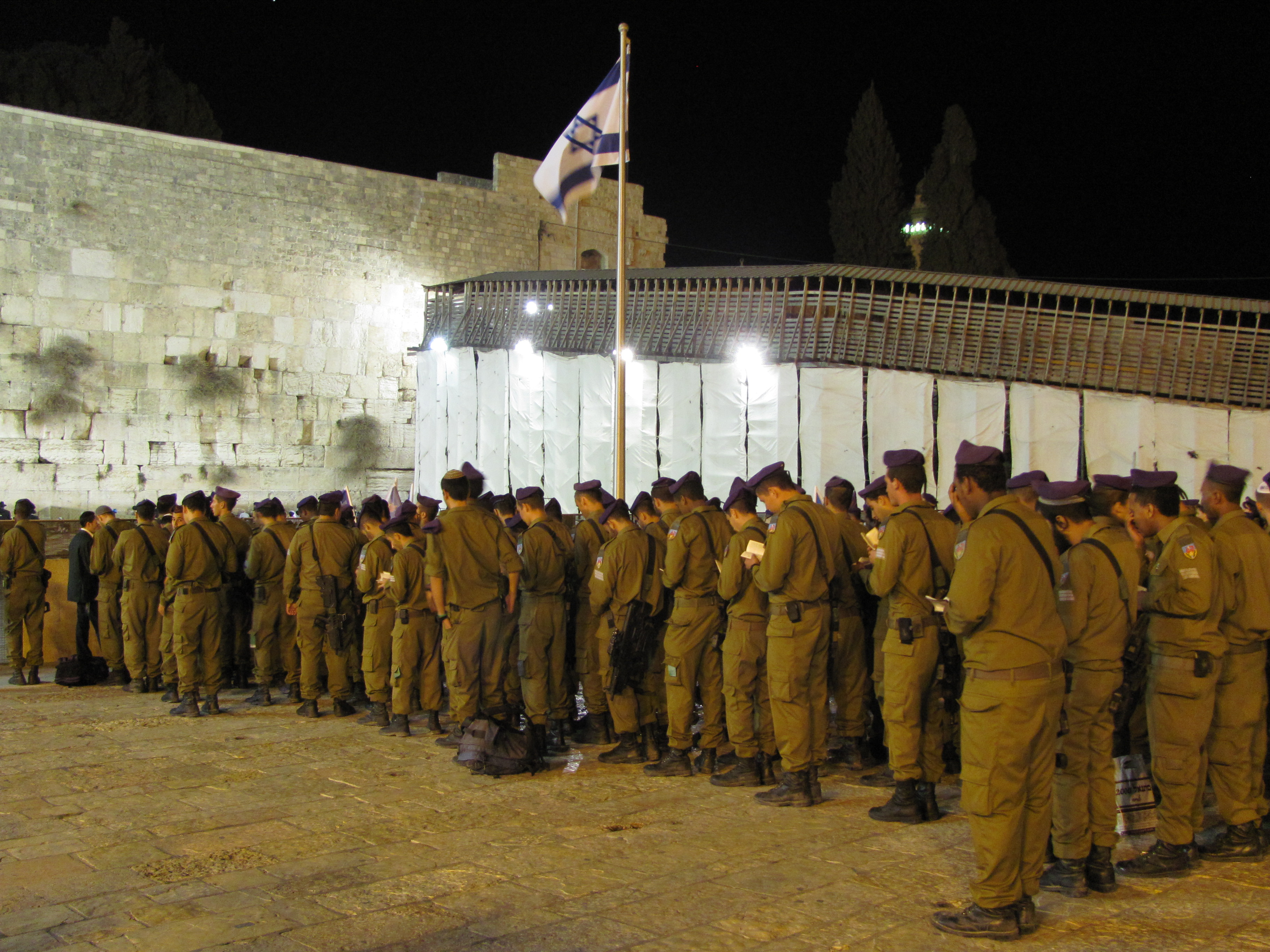
Members of the Israel Defense Forces' Givati Brigade pray the Evening Service (Ma'ariv) at the Western Wall, October 2010.

Individual prayer is considered acceptable, but prayer with a quorum of ten Jewish men—a minyan—is the most highly recommended form of prayer and is required for some prayers. An adult in this context means over the age of 12 or 13 (bat or bar mitzvah). Judaism had originally counted only men in the minyan for formal prayer, on the basis that one does not count someone who is not obligated to participate. The rabbis had exempted women from almost all time-specific positive mitzvot (commandments), including those parts of the prayer that cannot be recited without a quorum, due to women in the past having duties with children. Orthodox Judaism still follows this reasoning.

Since 1973, Conservative congregations have overwhelmingly become egalitarian and count women in the minyan. A very small number of congregations that identify themselves as Conservative have resisted these changes and continue to exclude women from the minyan. Those Reform and Reconstructionist congregations that consider a minyan mandatory for communal prayer, count both men and women for a minyan. Orthodox Judaism ordains male rabbis and cantors.

There is a publicly said prayer, called Birkhat HaGomel, for giving thanks for surviving an illness or danger. which, in addition to needing a Minyan, also needs a Torah scroll taken out for a scheduled Torah reading.

=== Attire ===
- Head covering. In most synagogues, it is considered a sign of respect for male attendees to wear a head covering, either a dress hat or a kippa (skull cap, plural kipot, also known by the Yiddish term yarmulke) and married women are also expected to cover their heads. It is common practice for everyone who attends a synagogue to wear a head covering. Some Conservative synagogues may also encourage (but rarely require) women to cover their heads. Many Reform and Progressive synagogues do not require people to cover their heads, although individual worshipers, both men and women, may choose to. Many Orthodox and some conservative men and women wear a head covering throughout their day, even when not at synagogue.
- Tallit (prayer shawl) is traditionally worn during all morning services (with the exception of Tisha B'av in many communities), during Aliyah to the Torah, as well as during all the services of Yom Kippur. In some synagogues, the hazzan alone wears a tallit during the daily afternoon and evening services. In Orthodox synagogues they are expected to be worn only by men who are halakhically Jewish and though in some Conservative synagogues they should be worn only by men, in other Conservative synagogues both men and women who are halakhically Jewish should wear a tallit. In most Orthodox Ashkenazi synagogues (except for those who follow German or Hungarian or Sephardic customs) they are worn only by men who are or have been married.
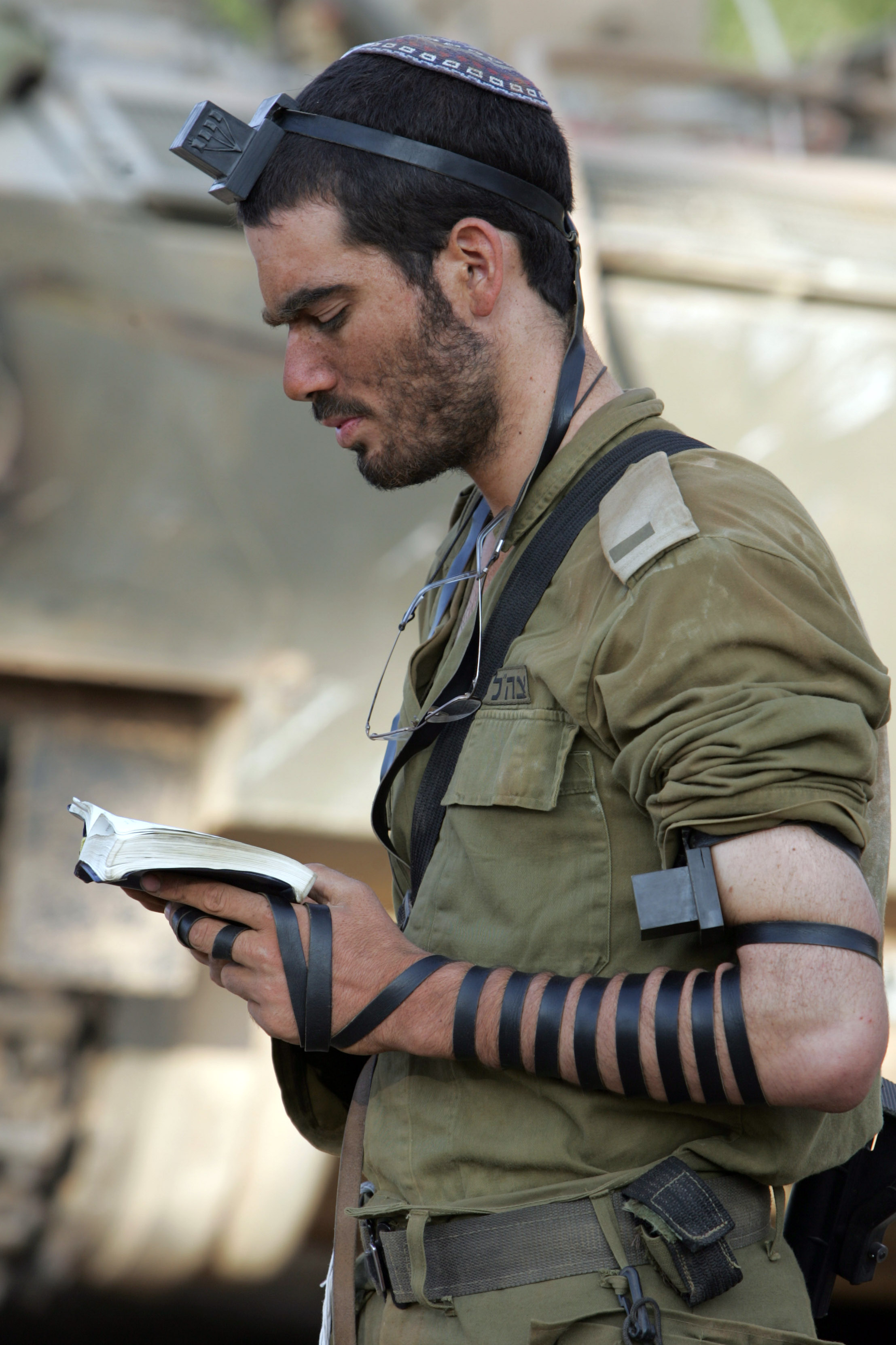
- IDF soldier Asael Lubotzky prays with tefillin.
  Tefillin (phylacteries) are a set of small cubic leather boxes painted black, containing scrolls of parchment inscribed with verses from the Torah. They are tied to the head and arm with leather straps dyed black, and worn by men during weekday morning prayers. In Orthodox synagogues they are expected to be worn only by men. The Karaite Jews, however, do not don tefillin.
- Tzeniut (modesty) applies to men and women. When attending Orthodox synagogues, women will likely be expected to wear long sleeves (past the elbows), long skirts (past the knees), a high neckline (to the collar bone), and if married, to cover their hair with a wig, scarf, hat or a combination of the above. For men, short pants or sleeveless shirts are regarded as inappropriate. In some Conservative and Reform synagogues the dress code may be more lax, but still respectful.

=== Other laws and customs ===
In the event one of the prayers was missed inadvertently, the Amidah prayer is said twice in the next service—a procedure known as tefillat tashlumin.

Many Jews sway their body back and forth during prayer. This practice is referred to as shuckling in Yiddish.

Many are accustomed to giving charity before, during (especially during Vayivarech David) or after prayer, as "tzedakah" will make their prayer more effective.

According to the Talmud, during prayer one should face toward Jerusalem, and specifically the site of the Temple in Jerusalem. This is based on Solomon's prayer "...and they will pray to You toward their land, which You gave to their fathers; the city which You have chosen; and the house which I have built for Your name" (1 Kings 8:48).

== Daily prayers ==
=== Shacharit ===
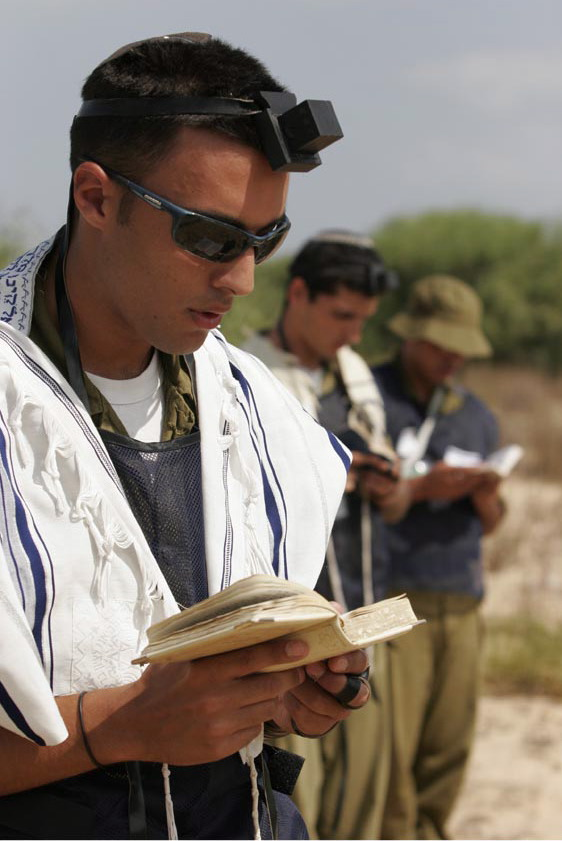
Morning Prayer, 2005

The Shacharit (from shachar, morning light) prayer is recited in the morning. Halacha limits parts of its recitation to the first three (Shema) or four (Amidah) hours of the day, where "hours" are 1/12 of daylight time, making these times dependent on the season.

Shacharit is generally the lengthiest prayer of the day. Its components include Birkot hashachar, Korbanot, Pesukei dezimra, the Shema Yisrael and its blessings, the Amidah, and Tachanun. Of these, the recitation of Shema Yisrael and the Amidah constitute the core of the Shacharit service. Jews wear tallit and tefillin during the Shacharit prayer.

=== Mincha ===
Mincha or Minha may be recited from half an hour after halachic noontime, until sunset. Sephardim and Italian Jews start the Mincha prayers with Psalm 84 and Korbanot, and usually continue with the Pittum hakketoret. The opening section is concluded with Malachi 3:4.

Ashrei is recited, followed by half-Kaddish, the Amidah (including repetition), Tachanun, and then the full Kaddish. Sephardim insert a Psalm, followed by the Mourner's Kaddish. After this follows, in most modern rites, the Aleinu. Most Ashkenazim then conclude with the Mourner's Kaddish. In Ashkenazic, Italian and Yemenite communities, they wear a tallit.

=== Ma'ariv/Arvit ===
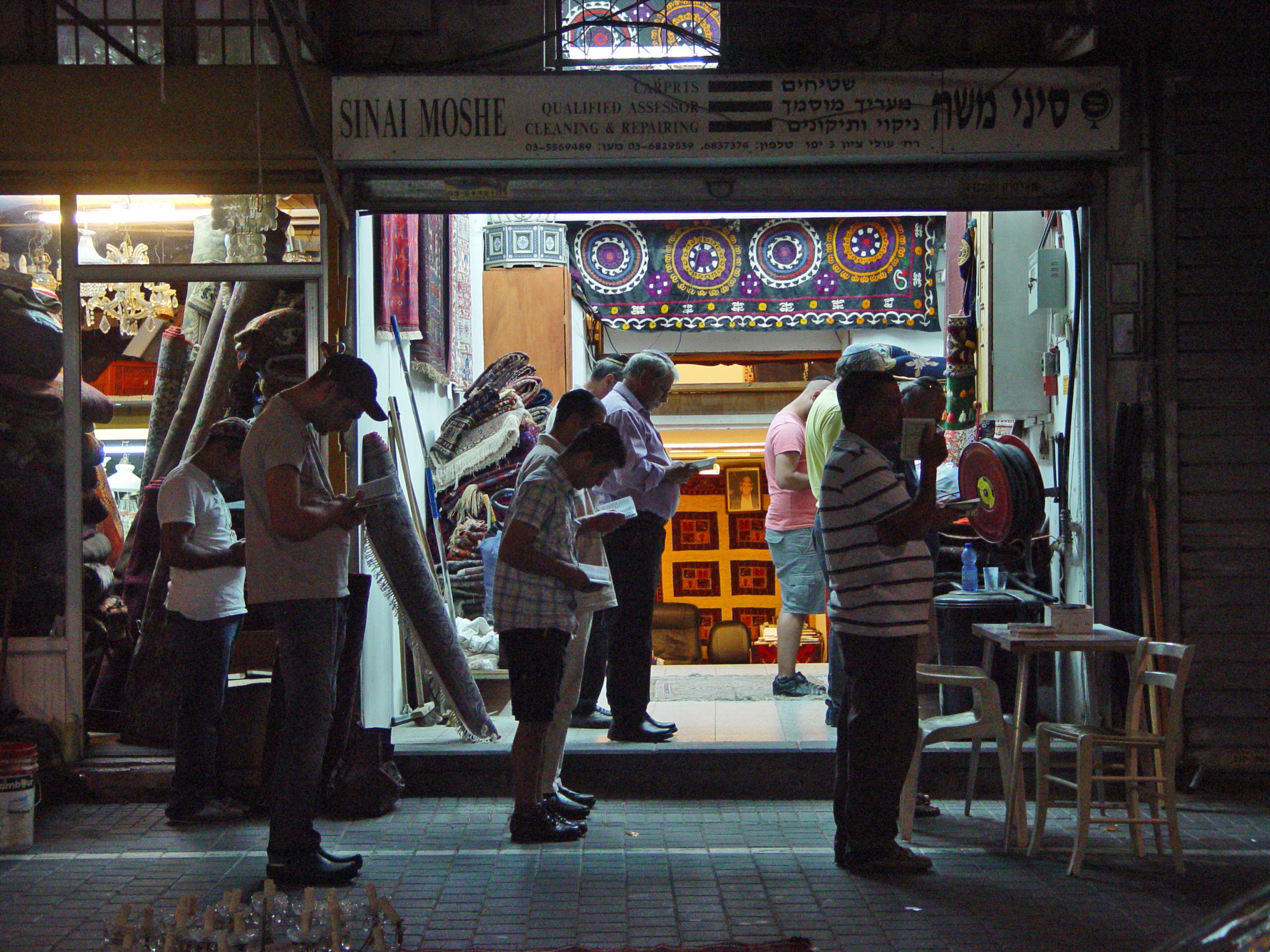
Minyan Ma'ariv prayer in a Jaffa Tel Aviv flea-market shop

Generally, the time when Maariv can first be recited is when the time for reciting Mincha ends. But there are varying opinions on this. Maariv should not begin before 1¼ hours before sunset. Others delay Maariv until after sunset or after dusk. If Maariv is recited prior to dusk, individuals repeat the Shema later in the evening.

The main components of Maariv are the recitation of the Shema (with two blessings before it and two after it), followed by the Amidah (which is not repeated, unlike with other recitations of the Amidah). Some communities add a third blessing between the Shema and Amidah. Some additional prayers and scriptural verses are recited as well; these vary by community and occasion.

== Prayer on Shabbat ==
On Shabbat, prayers are similar in structure to those on weekdays, although almost every part is lengthened. One exception is the Amidah, the main prayer, which is abridged. The first three and last three blessings are recited as usual, but the middle thirteen are replaced with a single blessing known as "sanctity of the day," describing the Sabbat. Atypically, this middle blessing is different for each of the prayers.

=== Friday night ===
Shabbat services begin on Friday afternoon with the weekday Mincha. Tachnun is omitted. In some Ashkenazic communities, Aleinu is omitted since it will be followed immediately by Kabbalat Shabbat. In recent times, some prefer to daven early mincha on Friday.

Some communities recite the Song of Songs, and then in most communities followed by the Kabbalat Shabbat, the mystical prelude to Shabbat services composed by 16th-century Kabbalists. Although the service was composed in the 16th century, some communities did not adopt it until much later; for example, it was not recited in the main synagogue in Frankfurt am Main until the mid-19th century, and it was not recited in Worms even later. This Hebrew term literally means "Receiving the Shabbat". In recent decades, some communities have adopted the practice to sing the piyut Yedid Nefesh before (or occasionally after) the Kabbalat Shabbat prayers.

In Ashkenazic and some Sephardic communities, Kabbalat Shabbat begins with six Psalms, representing the six weekdays. In Italian Nusach and many Sephardic communinties (including Spanish and Portuguese Jews and many Middle Eastern Sephardic communities) only Psalm 29 is recited (some add Psalm 100). Some then recite Ana BeKoach. After that, the poem Lekha Dodi is recited. It based on the words of the Talmudic sage Hanina: "Come, let us go out to meet the Queen Shabbat". Kabbalat Shabbat is concluded by Psalm 92 (in most communities, the recital of which constitutes acceptance of the current Shabbat with all its obligations) and Psalm 93. Many add a study section here, including Bameh Madlikin and Amar rabbi El'azar and the concluding Kaddish deRabbanan (in the Western Ashkenazic rite, a mourners kaddish is instead recited after Bameh Madlikin) and is then followed by the Maariv service; other communities delay the study session until after Maariv. According to Nusach Sefard, a passage from the Zohar, entitled Kegavna is recited instead of Bameh Madlikin. In modern times the Kabbalat Shabbat has been set to music by many composers including: Robert Strassburg and Samuel Adler

The Shema section of the Friday night service varies in some details from the weekday services—mainly in the different ending of the Hashkivenu prayer and the omission of Baruch HaShem Le'Olam prayer in those traditions where this section is otherwise recited. In the Italian rite, there are also different versions of the Ma'ariv aravim prayer (beginning asher killah) and the Emet Ve-Emunah prayer.

Most commemorate the Shabbat at this point with VeShameru. The custom to recite these verses appears in many early sources such as Siddur Rav Saadya Gaon (who recited the blessing Yiru Eineinu after these verses) and is found in the vast majority of old prayer books of a variety of rites. However, it is absent from the Yemenite Baladi tradition (although has been added in most Baladi communities in the last few hundred years), and it is not recited according to the traditions of the Vilna Gaon or Chabad who are opposed to adding additional readings to the siddur which are not mentioned in the Talmud.

On Friday night, the middle blessing of the Amidah discusses the conclusion of creation, quoting the relevant verses from Genesis. The Amidah is then followed by the Seven-Faceted Blessing, the hazzan's mini-repetition of the Amidah. In some Ashkenazi Orthodox synagogues the second chapter of Mishnah tractate Shabbat, Bameh Madlikin, is read at this point, instead of earlier. Kiddush is recited in the synagogue in many Ashkenazic Italian communities. Some communities recite Psalm 23 and the service then follows with Aleinu. Most Sephardic and many Ashkenazic synagogues end with the singing of Yigdal, a poetic adaptation of Maimonides' 13 principles of Jewish faith. Other Ashkenazic synagogues end with Adon Olam instead, and some do not recite either poem.

=== Shacharit ===
Shabbat morning prayers differ from weekday morning prayers in several ways: an expanded version of Pesukei dezimra, a longer version of the Yotzer ohr blessing (in most communities), the seven-blessing Shabbat version of the Amidah, no Tachanun, a longer Torah reading including the reading of the Haftarah, and some additional prayers after the Torah reading. In many communities, the rabbi (or a learned member of the congregation) delivers a sermon at the very end of Shacharit and before Mussaf, usually on the topic of the Torah reading.

=== Mussaf ===
The Musaf service starts with the silent recitation of the Amidah. The middle blessing includes the Tikanta Shabbat reading on the holiness of Shabbat (in Yemenite communities, as well as some Sephardic communities Le-Mosheh Tsivita is recited instead of Tikanta Shabbat), and then by a reading from the scriptural Book of Numbers about the sacrifices that used to be performed in the Temple in Jerusalem. Next comes Yismechu, "They shall rejoice in Your sovereignty", and Eloheynu, "Our God and God of our Ancestors, may you be pleased with our rest" (which is recited during all Amidahs of the Shabbat). After the silent prayer, the leader repeats the prayer, adding an expanded version of Kedushah. In some Sephardic and Yemenite communities, rather than the silent prayer and repetition, the leader recited his own prayer aloud and the congregation prays along with him.

After the Amidah comes the full Kaddish, followed by Ein keloheinu. In Orthodox Judaism this is followed by a reading from the Talmud on the incense offering called Pittum Haketoreth and daily psalms that used to be recited in the Temple in Jerusalem. These readings are usually omitted by Conservative Jews, and are always omitted by Reform Jews.

The Musaf service culminates with the Rabbi's Kaddish (in the Western Ashkenazic rite, the Mourners Kaddish is recited instead), the Aleinu, followed in many communities by the Mourner's Kaddish. Some synagogues conclude with the reading of Shir Hayichud, Anim Zemirot (sometimes followed by a Mourner's Kaddish), the Psalm of the Day (sometimes followed by a Mourner's Kaddish) - in some communities, these are recited before the Torah reading or at the beginning of services instead. Many communities conclude with either Adon Olam or Yigdal.

=== Mincha ===
Mincha commences with Ashrei and the prayer Uva letzion, after which the first section of the next weekly portion is read from the Torah scroll. The Amidah follows the same pattern as the other Shabbat Amidah prayers, with the middle blessing starting Attah Echad. The short prayer Tzidkatcha is recited after the Amidah, followed by Kaddish and Aleinu.

=== Ma'ariv ===
At the conclusion of the Shabbat, the weekday Ma'ariv is recited. Some communities recite (sometimes sing) Psalm 144 and Psalm 67. In the amidah, ata chonantanu is added in the fourth blessing. After the conclusion of the Amidah, Vihi No'am, Veyiten Lecha, and Havdalah are recited, followed by Aleinu; some delay the recitation of Ve-Yitten lekha until after the recitation of Havdalah at home.

=== Prayer at any time ===
Prayer is also customary at many other times besides in the set daily routine. Examples are: people often pray at a Chuppah, the night before a baby has a Bris or at the grave of a righteous person, asking for their prayers to be answered in the merit of the righteous person.

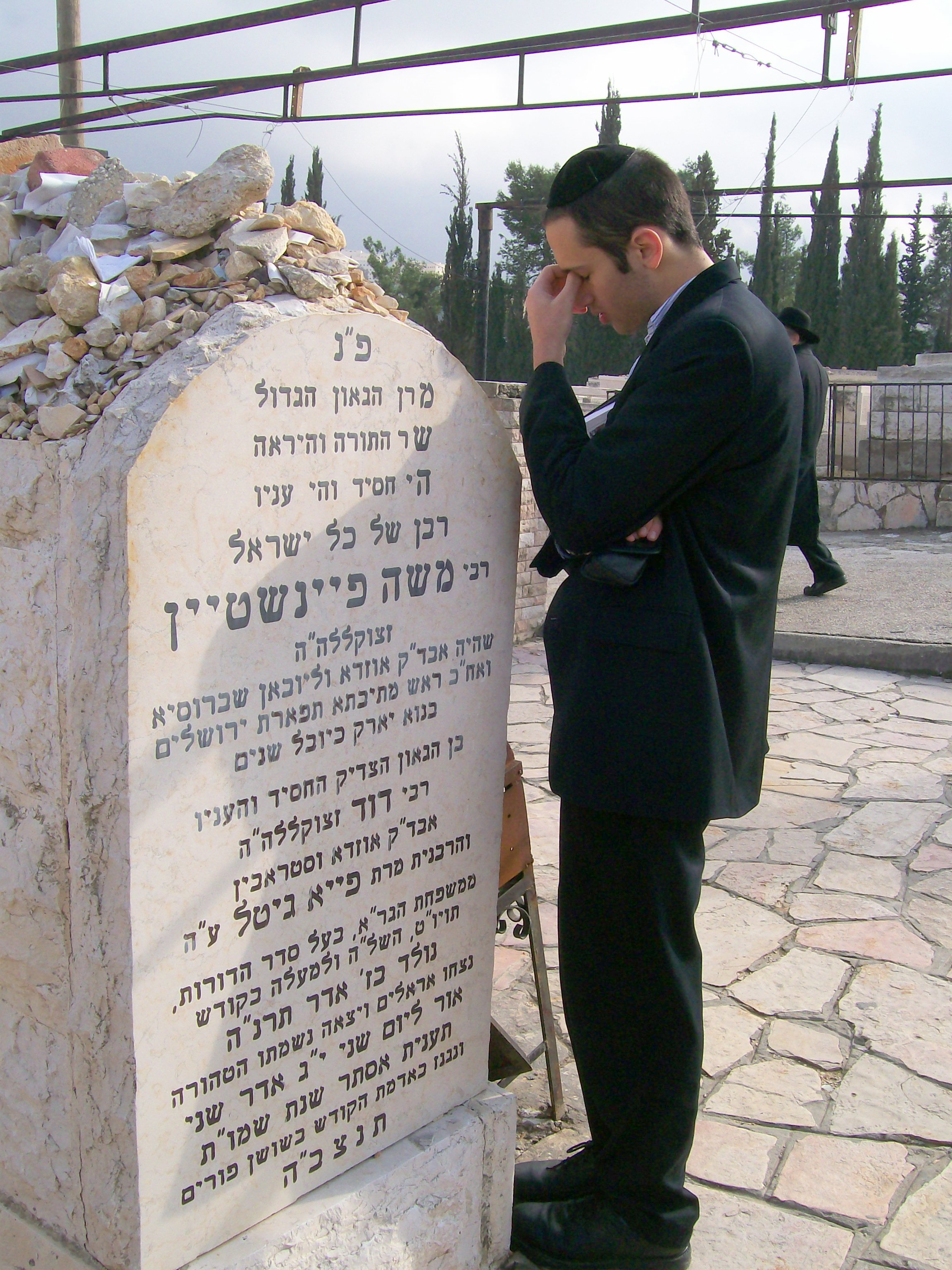
Prayer at the grave of Rabbi Moshe Feinstein's

== Special observances and circumstances ==
=== Rosh Hashana and Yom Kippur ===
The services for the Days of Awe, Rosh Hashana and Yom Kippur, take on a solemn tone as befits these days. Traditional solemn tunes are used in the prayers.

The musaf service on Rosh Hashana has nine blessings; the three middle blessings include scriptural verses attesting to sovereignty, remembrance and the shofar, which is sounded during the service.

Yom Kippur is the only day in the year when there are five prayer services. The evening service, containing the Ma'ariv prayer, is widely known as "Kol Nidrei", the opening declaration made preceding the prayer. During the daytime, shacharit, musaf (which is recited on Shabbat and all festivals) and mincha are followed, as the sun begins to set, by Ne'ila, which is recited just this once a year.

=== Pesach, Shavuot and Sukkot ===
The services for the three festivals of Pesach ("Passover"), Shavuot ("Feast of Weeks" or "Pentecost"), and Sukkot ("Feast of Tabernacles") are alike, except for interpolated piyyutim and readings for each individual festival. The preliminaries and conclusions of the prayers are the same as on Shabbat. The Amidah on these festivals only contains seven benedictions, with Attah Bechartanu as the main one. After the Shacharit Amidah, Hallel (communal recitation of Psalms 113–118) follows; on the last six days of Passover, Hallal is recited in its abbreviated form and customs vary as to whether a blessing is recited.

The Musaf service includes Umi-Penei Hata'enu, with reference to the special festival and Temple sacrifices on the occasion.

The Priestly Blessing ("dukhening") is pronounced during the repetition of the Amidah. While this occurs daily in Israel and most Sephardic congregations, it occurs only on Pesach, Shavuot, Sukkot, Rosh Hashanah, and Yom Kippur in Ashkenazic (and some Sephardic communities) congregations of the Jewish diaspora. Even when it is omitted, or when there are no kohanim present, a special prayer is instead recited by the hazzan after the Modim ("Thanksgiving") prayer) in commemoration of the priestly blessing. (American Reform Jews omit the Musaf service.)

== Role of women ==
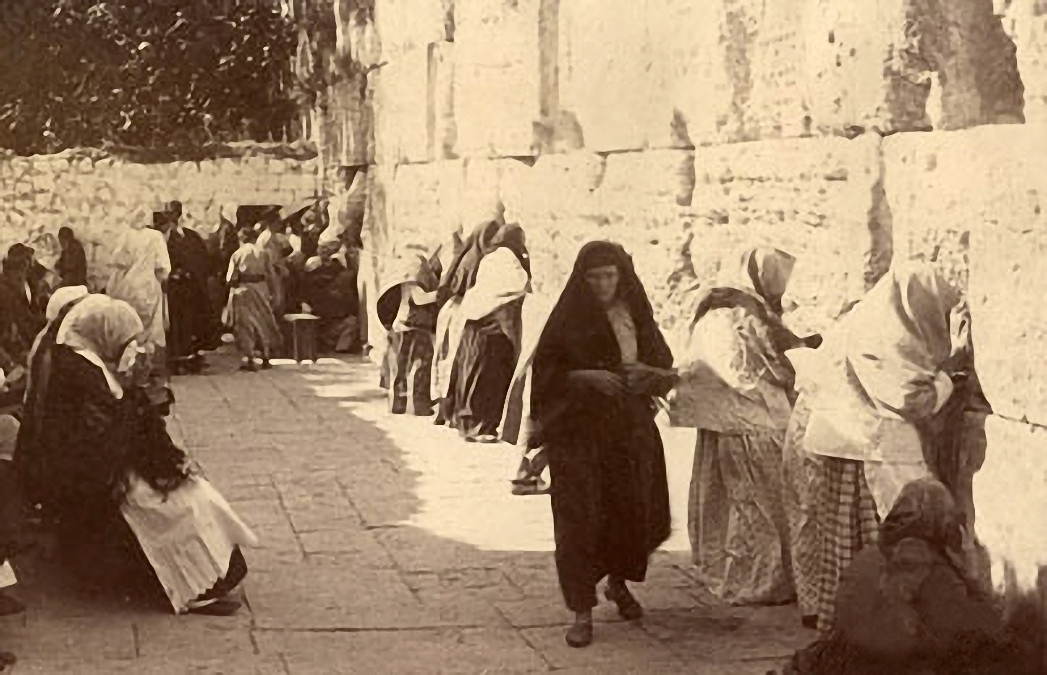
Jewish women praying by the Western Wall, early 1900s

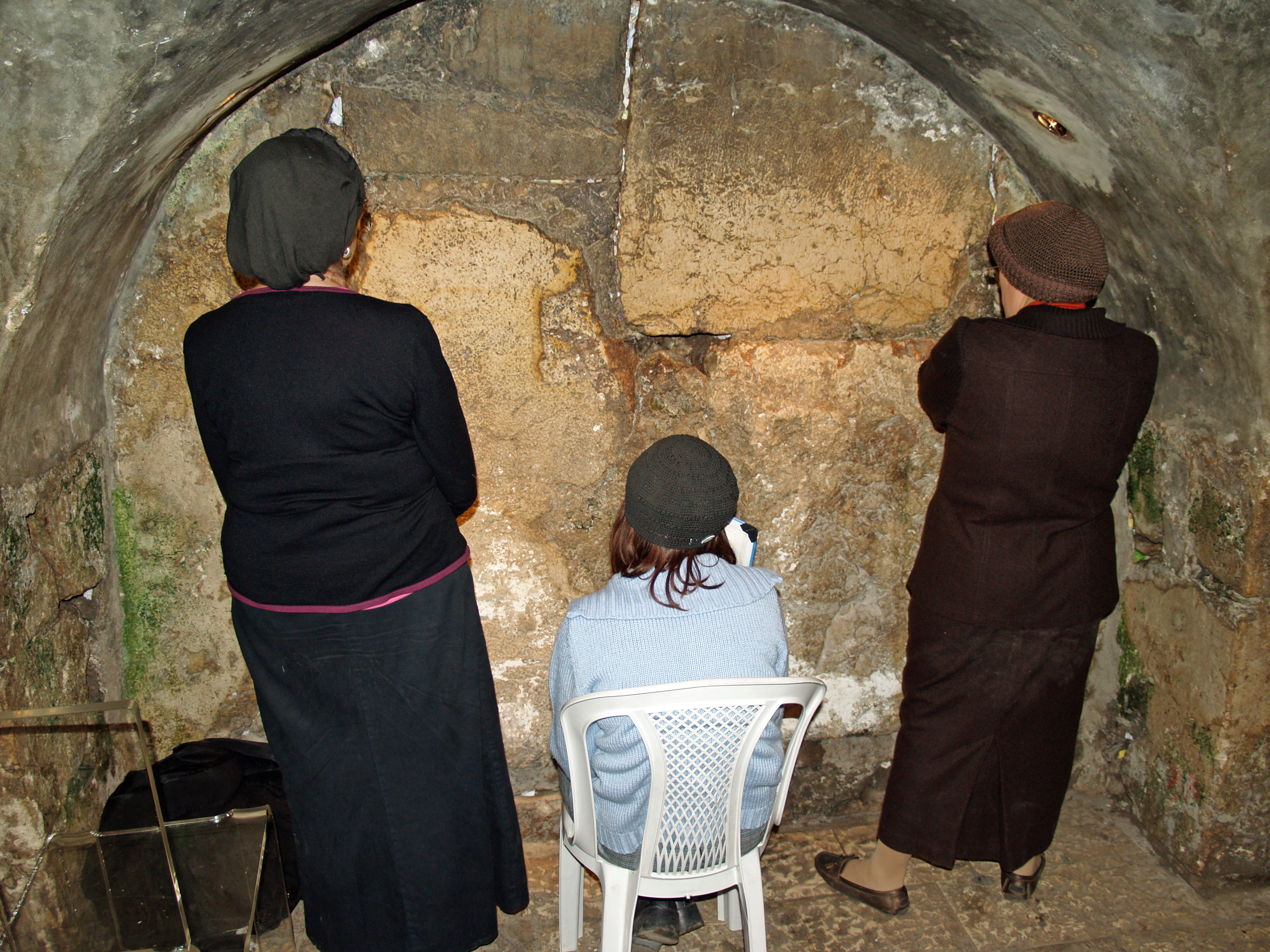
Women praying in the Western Wall tunnel at the closest physical point to the Holy of Holies

=== Number of obligatory prayers ===
According to halakha, Jewish men are obligated to perform prayer three times a day, within specific time ranges (zmanim), plus additional services on Jewish holidays.

According to the Talmud, women are generally exempted from obligations that have to be performed at a certain time. (This has interpreted as being due to the need to care for small children. In accordance with the general exemption from time-bound obligations, women are not required to recite the morning and evening Shema (though Mishnah Berurah suggests that they say it anyway), and most Orthodox authorities have exempted women from reciting Maariv.

Authorities have disagreed on whether this exemption applies to additional prayers. According to (Ashkenazi) Magen Avraham and more recently (Sephardi) Rabbi Ovadia Yosef, women are only required to pray once a day, in any form they choose, so long as the prayer contains praise of (brakhot), requests to (bakashot), and thanks of (hodot) God. However, most Orthodox authorities agree that women are not completely exempt from time-bound prayer. The Mishnah Berurah, an important code of Ashkenazic Jewish law, holds that the Men of the Great Assembly obligated women to recite Shacharit and Minchah each day, "just like men". Nonetheless, even the most liberal Orthodox authorities hold that women cannot count in a minyan for purposes of public prayer.

Traditionally, women were also reciting individual tkhine prayers in Yiddish.

Conservative Judaism regards the halakhic system of multiple daily prayers as mandatory. Since 2002, Jewish women from Conservative congregations have been regarded as having undertaken a communal obligation to pray the same prayers at the same times as men, with traditional communities and individual women not required to pray. Reform and Reconstructionist congregations do not regard halakha as binding.

=== Seating ===
Throughout Orthodox Judaism, including its most liberal forms, men and women are required to sit in separate sections with a mechitza (partition) separating them. Historically, a learned woman in the weibershul (women's section or annex) of a synagogue took on the informal role of precentress or firzogerin for the women praying in parallel to the main service led in the men's section. Conservative/Masorti Judaism permits mixed seating (almost universally in the United States, but not in all countries). All Reform and Reconstructionist congregations have mixed seating.

=== Prayer leaders ===
Haredi and the vast majority of Modern Orthodox Judaism has a blanket prohibition on women leading public congregational prayers. Conservative Judaism has developed a blanket justification for women leading all or virtually all such prayers, holding that although only obligated individuals can lead prayers and women were not traditionally obligated, Conservative Jewish women in modern times have as a collective whole voluntarily undertaken such an obligation. Reform and Reconstructionist congregations permit women to perform all prayer roles because they do not regard halakha as binding.

1. Because women were required to perform certain korbanot (sacrifices) in the Temple in Jerusalem, women today are required to perform, and hence can lead (and can count in the minyan for if required), the specific prayers substituting for these specific sacrifices. Birchat Hagomel falls in this category.
2. Because certain parts of the service were added after the Talmud defined mandatory services, such prayers are equally voluntary on everyone and hence can be led by women (and no minyan is required). Pseukei D'Zimrah in the morning and Kabbalat Shabbat on Friday nights fall in this category.
3. In cases where the Talmud indicates that women are generally qualified to lead certain services but do not do so because of the "dignity of the congregation", modern congregations are permitted to waive such dignity if they wish. Torah reading on Shabbat falls in this category. An argument that women are permitted to lead the services removing and replacing the Torah in the Ark on Shabbat extends from their ability to participate in Torah reading then.

A very small number of Modern Orthodox congregations accept some such arguments, but very few Orthodox congregations or authorities accept all or even most of them. Many of those who do not accept this reasoning point to kol isha, the tradition that prohibits a man from hearing a woman other than his wife or close blood relative sing. JOFA refers to congregations generally accepting such arguments as Partnership Minyanim. On Shabbat in a Partnership Minyan, women can typically lead Kabbalat Shabbat, the P'seukei D'Zimrah, the services for removing the Torah from and replacing it to the Ark, and Torah reading, as well as give a D'Var Torah or sermon.

Ephraim Mirvis, an Orthodox rabbi who serves as the Chief Rabbi of the United Hebrew Congregations of the Commonwealth, supports Shabbat prayer groups for Orthodox women, saying, "Some of our congregations have women prayer groups for Friday night, some Saturday mornings. This is without women reading from the Torah. But for women to come together as a group to pray, this is a good thing."

However, many Modern Orthodox rabbis, including Rabbi Hershel Schachter, Rabbi Mordechai Willig, Rabbi Nisson Alpert and others have ruled that this practice is not permitted. These practices are also unheard of in the Hareidi world

== Role of minors ==
In most divisions of Judaism boys prior to bar mitzvah cannot act as a Chazzen for prayer services that contain devarim sheb'kidusha, i.e. Kaddish, Barechu, the amida, etc., or receive an aliya or chant the Torah for the congregation. Since Kabbalat Shabbat and Pesukei D'zimra do not technically require a chazzan at all, it is possible for a boy prior to bar mitzvah to lead these services. The conclusion of the service on Shabbat and chagim may also be led by children. Under the Moroccan, Yemenite, and Mizrachi customs, a boy prior to bar mitzvah may lead certain prayers, read the Torah, and have an aliyah. It is customary among many Ashkenazim to have children sing "Adon 'Olam" after Mussaf and "Yigdal" after Shabbat and Holiday Maariv. Among Sefardim, Mizrachim, Yemenites, and some Askenazim, a child leads the congregation in Kiryat Shema.

== See also ==
- Baladi-rite prayer
- Carlebach minyan
- List of Jewish prayers and blessings

== Bibliography ==
- Donin, Hayim H. (1991). To Pray As A Jew: A Guide To The Prayer Book And The Synagogue Service. New York: Basic Books. ISBN 978-0-465-08633-7.
- Entering Jewish Prayer, Reuven Hammer (ISBN 0-8052-1022-9)
- Kavvana: Directing the Heart in Jewish Prayer, Seth Kadish, Jason Aronson Inc. 1997. ISBN 0-7657-5952-7.
- Or Hadash: A Commentary on Siddur Sim Shalom for Shabbat and Festivals, Reuven Hammer, The Rabbinical Assembly and the United Synagogue of Conservative Judaism
- S. Baer. Siddur Avodath Yisrael (newly researched text with commentary Yachin Lashon), 19th century.
- A Guide to Jewish Prayer, Rabbi Adin Steinsaltz, Shocken Books (ISBN 0-8052-4174-4)
- Hilchot Tefilla: A Comprehensive Guide to the Laws of Daily Prayer, David Brofsky, KTAV Publishing House/OU Press/Yeshivat Har Etzion. 2010. (ISBN 978-1-60280-164-6)
- God's Favorite Prayers, Tzvee Zahavy, Talmudic Books. 2011. (ISBN 978-0-615-50949-5)
- Holistic Prayer: A Guide to Jewish Spirituality, Rabbi Avi Weiss, Maggid Books. 2014. (ISBN 978-1-592-64334-9)
