= André Ungar =

Hungarian philosopher (1929–2020)

André Ungar (July 21, 1929 – May 5, 2020) was a Hungarian-born Holocaust survivor, doctor of philosophy, liturgist, social activist, and rabbi who lived in England, South Africa and the United States. He was a rabbi at Temple Emanuel of the Pascack Valley in Westwood and later Woodcliff Lake, New Jersey for 44 years.

== Life ==
Ungar was born and raised in a prosperous Orthodox family in Budapest. The family survived the Holocaust by going into hiding under pseudonyms in a non-Jewish quarter of the city. In January 1955 he arrived to take up an appointment as rabbi of the Jewish Reform Congregation in Port Elizabeth. He considered Jewish opposition to apartheid was mandatory in terms of what they themselves had experienced during the Holocaust. In November 1956, he openly took a stand against the Group Areas Act which racialized urban residential planning, arguing it was akin to the ghettoization he had himself experienced in Hungary. He further criticized South African Jews for what he considered to be the neglect of their moral responsibilities in failing to challenge apartheid, writing:-

Personal memories of oppression must still be vivid in the minds of very many. There can hardly be a Jewish family in South Africa that has not lost near relations when Hitler’s racialism reached its logical culmination in mass slaughter. Both through cruel oppression in the tumult of many centuries, and through recent personal experiences and involvements, the Jews of South Africa should be historically and psychologically well equipped to recognize oppression and persecution whenever they occur, stand by the victims, and fight against those who by action or connivance, through inhumanity or stupidity or both, help maintain such a system.'

He subsequently found himself in conflict with members of his own congregation and more broadly, with the South African Jewish Board of Deputies (SAJBD) and resigned his post in October 1956. Shortly afterwards the South African government revoked his temporary residence permit, and he was given six weeks to leave the country.

Soon after he was appointed rabbi to the St. George’s Settlement Synagogue in Whitechapel. After a brief stint at a new synagogue, Temple Emanuel in Toronto, where his version of conservative orthodoxy grated with the congregation's Reform expectations, he took up a post at Temple B'Nai Abraham in Newark under rabbi Joachim Prinz from 1959 to 1961. He then became the Rabbi for a conservative suburban temple in Westwood NJ (later Woodcliff Lake) - Temple Emanuel of Pascack Valley where was a revered figure for forty-four years on the bimah.

Rabbi Ungar was the author of Living Judaism (Reform Synagogue of Great Britain: 1958), and Judaism for Our Time (RSGB: 1973); and various articles on the subject of Jewish philosophy. His alternative, poetic translations of the Amidah have appeared in all editions and versions of Siddur Sim Shalom, of the Conservative Jewish denomination.

== Sources ==
- Fishkoff, Sue (14 January 2011). "A half-century later, rabbis recall marching with Martin Luther King". Jewish Standard.
- Gilbert, Shirli (Spring–Summer 2010). "Jews and the Racial State: Legacies of the Holocaust in Apartheid South Africa, 1945–60". Jewish Social Studies. 16 (3): 32–64. doi:10.2979/jewisocistud.16.3.32. JSTOR 10.2979/jewisocistud.16.3.32.
- Magonet, Jonathan (2021). "Rabbi Andre Ungar z'l (21 July 1929–5 May 2020)". European Judaism. doi:10.3167/ej.2021.540115. S2CID 233851892.
- Manoim, Irwin (2019). "The loud-mouth rabbi who was told to go". Mavericks Inside the Tent;The Progressive Jewish Movement in South Africa and Its Impact on the Wider Community. University of Cape Town Press. pp. 15–25. ISBN 978-1-775-82264-6.
- Palmer, Joanne (14 May 2020). "Remembering Rabbi Andre Ungar". Times of Israel/Jewish Standard.
