= David Lieber =

American rabbi and academic (1925–2008)

Lieber and his wife Esther celebrating her birthday in 2006.

David L. Lieber (1925-2008), rabbi and scholar, was president emeritus of the University of Judaism (now known as the American Jewish University) and the senior editor of the Etz Hayim Humash. He helped pioneer the Ramah camps, serving as the founding head counselor in the first of the camps in Wisconsin, a director in Maine, the founding director of Camp Ramah in California, and the founding director of the Mador.

== Biography ==
=== Early life ===
David Leo Lieber was born in Poland on February 20, 1925 in the town Stryj (the city is now part of Ukraine). His parents, Max and Gussie Yarmush Lieber, moved with him to the United States, when he was two years old. The family spent some time on a relative's farm before ultimately settling on the Lower East Side of Manhattan, where David grew up.

=== Education ===
At age 19, he graduated from the City College of New York while simultaneously receiving a bachelor's degree in Hebrew literature from the Jewish Theological Seminary (JTS). In 1947, at age 22, he earned his master's in philosophy from Columbia, and he received his ordination from JTS a year later, in 1948. In 1951, he received a doctorate in Hebrew literature from JTS. His dissertation was on Tehilim, which he loved.

=== Family ===
David met the love of his life and wife of 63 years, Esther Kobre, through her brother, with whom he was good friends, and also through Hashomer Hadati (now Bnei Akiva). In 1943, when David Lieber was 18 and Esther Kobre was 16, they became engaged, and they married two years later on June 10, 1945. David and Esther Lieber had four children: Michael, Daniel, Deborah, and Susan.

=== Career ===
From 1950 to 1954, he served as rabbi at Sinai Temple in Los Angeles. From 1954 to 1956 he served as chaplain in the U.S. Air Force. In 1956, he was named dean of students at the University of Judaism. In 1964, he was named president of the University of Judaism, a post which he held for 29 years. As the university's first full-time president, Lieber oversaw the institution's expansion and established its rabbinic program, the first on the West Coast for Conservative Judaism, as well as its MBA program for non-profit management. When he stepped down as president in 1993, David Lieber was one of the nation's longest-serving college presidents. His career did not end with his retirement. After stepping down from the post of president, Lieber continued to teach as the Flora and Arnold Skovron Distinguished Service Professor of Biblical Literature and Thought at the UJ, he served as president of the Rabbinical Assembly from 1996 to 1998, and he also served as senior editor for the Etz Hayim Humash, the first official Torah and commentary of the Conservative Movement. Lieber first conceived of the idea of writing the Etz Hayim Humash in 1969, in order to create a "new Torah commentary to reflect the age in which it is made," but began working on the project eighteen years later, in 1987. The Etz Hayim Humash is more accepting of biblical criticism than the Humash previously used by the Conservative movement, the Hertz, containing a number of essays which challenge the historicity of some of the biblical narratives. It also reduces the frequency with which the word "He" is used to describe God. Lieber described his work on the Etz Hayim Humash as "a great privilege" and stated that he "worked with great scholars," and "Just seeing how they worked was an inspiration. It was a great honor and zechut, merit. It is a great joy to see it done."

=== Death ===
Lieber died at age 83 on December 15, 2008 due to a lung illness. His Yahrtzeit is observed on Yud-Tet Kislev (יט כיסלו). His wife, Esther Lieber, died January 27, 2017 (כט טבת).

== Awards ==
2002: National Jewish Book Award in the Nonfiction category for Etz Hayim: Torah and Commentary

== See also ==
- American Jewish University
- Conservative Judaism
- Elliot Dorff
- Etz Hayim Humash
- Abraham Joshua Heschel
- Chaim Potok
- Robert Wexler (rabbi)
- David Wolpe
- Robert Gordis
- Mordechai Kaplan
- Solomon Schecter
