= God of Abraham prayer =

Yiddish-language Jewish prayer

God of Abraham (Yiddish: גאָט פֿון אַבֿרהם, pronounced Got fun Avrohom, Got fin Avruhom) is a Jewish prayer in Yiddish, recited by women and girls in many Jewish communities at the conclusion of the Sabbath, marking its conclusion (while the males are in the synagogue praying Maariv). In some Hasidic sects it is also recited by males before the Havdalah, (Havdole) service. It is erroneously attributed to Levi Yitzchok of Berditchev; it is found in old prayer books from before his time. It is the most common Yiddish prayer.

Its name is commonly used as a title for the traditional Yiddish folk song Zol Nokh Zayn Shabbos (זאָל נאָך זײַן שבת), which lyricizes a delay in the recitation of the prayer to extend the Sabbath.

== Text ==
The most common version reads as follows:

גאָט פֿון אַבְֿרָהָם אוּן פֿון יִצְחָק און פֿון יַעֲקֹבֿ: בעהיט דײַן ליב פֿאָלק יִשְׂרָאֵל פֿון אַלעם בײזען אין דײַנעם לױב, אַז דער ליבער שַׁבָּת קֹדֶשׁ גײט, אַז די װאָך און דער חֹדֶשׁ און דער יאָר, זאָל אונז צוא קומען צו אֱמוּנָה שְׁלֵמָה, צו אֱמוּנַת חֲכָמִים, צו אַהֲבַת חֲבֵֿרִים, צו דְּבֵקוּת הַבּוֹרֵא בָּרוּךְ הוּא, מַאֲמִין צו זײַן בִּשְׁלשׁ עֶשְׂרֵה עִקָּרִים שֶׁלָּךְ, ובִּגְאוּלָה קְרוֹבָֿה בִּמְהֵרָה בְֿיָמֵינוּ, וּבִֿתְחִיַּת הַמֵּתִים, וּבִֿנְבֿוּאַת משֶׁה רַבֵּנוּ עָלָיו הַשָּׁלוֹם:

רִבּוֹנוֹ שֶׁל עוֹלָם דו ביזט דאָך הַנּוֹתֵן לַיָּעֵף כֹּחַ, גיב דײַנע ליבע ייִדישע קינדערליך אױך כֹּחַ דיר צו לױבען און נאָר דיך צו דינען און קײן אַנדערן חָלִילָה נישט, און אַז די װאָך און דער חֹדֶשׁ און דער יאָר זאָל אונז קומען צו געזונד און צו מַזָּל און צו בְּרָכָה וְהַצְלָחָה און צו חֶסֶד און צו בָּנֵי חַיֵּי אֲרִיכֵי וּמְזוֹנֵי רְוִיחֵי וְסִיַּעְתָּא דִּשְׁמַיָּא לָנוּ וּלְכָל יִשְׂרָאֵל וְנֹאמַר אָמֵן:

Translation:

God of Abraham, and of Isaac, and of Jacob, protect your beloved people Israel from all hurt, in your love. As the beloved holy Sabbath goes (away), that the week, should come to us with perfect faith, with faith in the sages, with love and attachment to good friends, to attachment to the blessed Creator, with belief in your thirteen principles of faith, and in the ultimate redemption, may it be soon, and the resurrection of the dead, and in the prophecy of Moses, our teacher, Peace be upon him.
Lord of the world! You are the one who gives strength to the weak! Give your beloved Jews more health and strength so we can love you and serve you, only you, and no other. And the week, should come to us with mercy, and good luck, and blessing, and success, and health, and fortune and glory, and to children, and long life, and abundant food, for us and all Israel, and let us say, Amen.
