= Etz Hayim Humash =

Humash of the Conservative Jewish movement

Etz Hayim: Torah and Commentary (also published with the subtitle A Torah Commentary) is a humash (the Torah in printed form) published and used by Conservative Judaism. Its production involved the collaboration of the Rabbinical Assembly, the United Synagogue of Conservative Judaism, and the Jewish Publication Society.

The title is from the Hebrew phrase Etz Hayim, meaning 'tree of life'.

== Authors ==
- Senior Editor: David L. Lieber
- P'Shat Commentary Editor: Chaim Potok
- D'Rash Commentary Editor: Harold Kushner
- Haftarah Commentary: Michael Fishbane
- Literary Editor: Jules Harlow
- Halacha L'Maaseh Editors: Elliot Dorff and Susan Grossman

== Content ==
The Etz Hayim contains the Hebrew text of the Torah (according to the Codex Leningradensis), the Jewish Publication Society (JPS)'s modern English translation of the Hebrew text, a number of commentaries, written in English, on the Torah which run alongside the Hebrew text and its English translation and a number of essays on the Torah and Tanakh in the back of the book. The Etz Hayim contains three types of commentary: the p'shat which discusses the literal meaning of the text, the drash which draws on Talmudic, Medieval, Chassidic, and Modern Jewish sources to expound on the deeper meaning of the text, and the halacha l'maaseh which explains how the text relates to current Jewish practice and halacha, or Jewish law. The essays in the back cover a wide range of topics, from kashrut to eschatology and everything in between.

Some of the essays uphold the traditional view that the Torah is the divine word of God, while others challenge it and question the historicity of some of the biblical narratives. This has raised objections, especially amongst stricter Orthodox circles, to the publication.

== Awards ==
2002: National Jewish Book Award in the Nonfiction category
