= Siddur Sim Shalom =

Siddur Sim Shalom (Hebrew: סדור שים שלום) refers to any siddur in a family of siddurim, Jewish prayerbooks, and related commentaries, published by the Rabbinical Assembly and the United Synagogue of Conservative Judaism.

There are four versions of the prayerbook, and two detailed commentaries that themselves contain the entire siddur. The commentaries are known as Or Hadash ("A New Light").

== Original 1985 edition ==
The original Siddur Sim Shalom was edited by Rabbi Jules Harlow, and published in 1985.

It succeeded the movement's first Shabbat siddur, Sabbath and Festival Prayer Book (Siddur Tefilot Yisrael), by Rabbi Morris Silverman, edited by a commission chaired by Rabbi Robert Gordis and first published in 1946.

Siddur Sim Shalom contained greater discussion of the beliefs and theology of Conservative Judaism. It contains services for weekdays, Shabbat and Jewish festivals. In accord with Conservative theology it contains prayers and services for Israel Independence Day and Yom HaShoah (Holocaust Memorial Day). It is egalitarian in usage, e.g. offering prayers for the wearing of tefillin and tallitot in both feminine and masculine form.

While very traditional when compared to the prayerbooks of Reform Judaism, this siddur does contain a number of notable departures from the text used in Orthodox Judaism.

Harlow writes that "Three of the early morning berakhot were modified to praise God for having created each individual in God's image, a free person and a Jew, rather than the conventional version which express gratitude for not having been created a woman, a slave or a non-Jew."

Perhaps the most significant difference between Conservative and Orthodox siddurim is found in the Birkhot HaShachar section; this part of the morning service traditionally contained many passages describing sacrifices that used to be carried out in the Temple in Jerusalem. Furthermore, Harlow briefly discusses details some of the morning prayers, such as the Birkhot HaShachar celebrating the renewal of life upon a new day. Many passages on animal sacrifices are not present in Siddur Sim Shalom. Harlow writes "The sacrificial ritual in ancient times was construed as means by which a Jew gained atonement for sin. After the destruction of the Temple and the consequential end of sacrifices there, the Jewish people were deprived of this means. To replace the readings on sacrifices, modern Conservative prayerbooks cite the talmudic teaching that deeds of loving-kindness now atone for sin; they draw upon rabbinic tradition to emphasize teachings about atonement and necessary behavior."

Additionally, the Amidah for Shabbat & Festivals is supplemented by an alternative, meditative, poetic translative rereading of the Amidah, written by André Ungar. The pocket edition also includes weekday Torah readings.

== Shabbat and festivals edition ==
Siddur Sim Shalom for Shabbat and Festivals was edited by Rabbi Leonard Cahan, and published in 1998. It started as a new edition of Siddur Sim Shalom just for Shabbat and Festivals (it contains no weekday services, save for Minhah preceding and Maariv following Shabbat and Festivals; this resulting thinner edition is thus nicknamed "Slim Shalom"). Most of the translations are nearly identical to Harlow's 1985 edition, but this siddur uses gender-sensitive translations of the names of God, and presents the option to use the Imahot (matriarchs) in the Amidah (Shemoneh Esrei).

It also restores a few traditional Ashkenazic prayers that were not in the 1985 version, including Rabbi Ishmael's 13 principles of biblical interpretation, the B'rah Dodi poems for Pesach, Ana B'kho-ah at the end of Psalm 29 in Kabbalat Shabbat, and Ushpizin for Sukkot, included in a new, egalitarian version. The Y'hi Ratzon meditation following the Musaf Amidah is restored.

It includes new translations of a number of prayers and poems that were not translated at all in the previous edition, including Akdamut and the Hoshanot (only summaries of these prayers had been given previously.) It offers an easier to follow layout and table of contents; many pages have notes explaining the background and meanings of the prayers; guidelines and instructions on the content, choreography and continuity of the service. There is an increased use of transliteration. It contains a comprehensive section of Shabbat and Holiday home rituals.

== Weekdays edition ==
Siddur Sim Shalom for Weekdays was edited by Rabbi Avram Israel Reisner, and published in 2003. This siddur is the companion to Sim Shalom for Shabbat and Festivals. In the introduction the editor writes:

We began with the text of the original Siddur Sim Shalom published in 1985 under the...skillful editorship of Rabbi Jules Harlow whose eloquent and poetic translations inspire this text....Many of the innovations and approaches of the 'Siddur for Shabbat and Festivals' have been adopted here. Whenever possible, pages were reproduced intact, or with minor changes.

This weekday siddur contains Torah reading, inspirational messages, services for the home and includes new materials for special occasions and commemorations; as well as Minhah for Shabbat and Festivals to enable the worshipper to use one book to pray and follow along with the Shabbat afternoon Torah reading, which is the same portion as that read on Monday and Thursday mornings of the coming week.

We felt keenly that while the miraculous events of the founding of the State of Israel had found fitting expression {in the other Conservative siddurim} the more difficult experience of the Holocaust had yet to find an appropriate place in our prayers, Therefore, we composed a Nahum prayer for Yom Ha-shoah, inspired by that which appeared in Siddur Va-ani Tefillati of the Masorti Movement in 1998. In an insert into the Amidah, similar to that used traditionally on Tisha B'Av, we seek God's comfort in light of our people's losses in Europe during the Holocaust. We felt the need, beyond that, to acknowledge on a daily basis the enormous effect that the Holocaust has had upon our people. At the end of Tahanun papers, in a prayer which reflects our suffering, we added reference to the anguish we still feel.

== Friday night edition ==
Siddur Sim Shalom for Friday Night: With Commentary and Complete Transliteration. Edited by Laurence A. Sebert. Offers a complete transliteration of the Friday night service, including Minhah, Kabbalat Shabbat, and Maariv. It uses the Hebrew text and translation from Siddur Sim Shalom for Shabbat and Festivals and commentary from Or Hadash.

== Or Hadash ==
Or Hadash: A Commentary on Siddur Sim Shalom for Shabbat and Festivals was written by Israel Masorti Rabbi Reuven Hammer, and published in 2003. It contains the complete text of the siddur for the Sabbath and festivals, surrounded by a comprehensive commentary. The page layout loosely resembles that of the Talmud.

Or Hadash: A Commentary on Siddur Sim Shalom for Weekdays was also written by Israel Masorti Rabbi Reuven Hammer, and published in 2008. It contains the complete text of the siddur for weekdays, surrounded by a comprehensive commentary.

Both volumes offer information on the historical development of the liturgy, "a phrase-by-phrase commentary, a linguistic, literary and theological explanation of their structure and meaning as well as interpretations meant to make them relevant for the modern worshipper."

== Successor series ==
In 2010 the Rabbinical Assembly released the first in a series of successor volumes. Lev Shalem ("A full heart") 2010 saw the release of Mahzor Lev Shalem, for Rosh HaShanah and Yom Kippur, while 2016 brought the release of Siddur Lev Shalem, for Shabbat and Festivals. In 2018, the latest addition was Pirkei Avot: The Wisdom of Our Sages.

These prayerbooks contain entirely new translations and commentaries, and slightly different choices of prayers. They often give more literal translations of the prayers. English transliterations are offered for all prayers and lines recited aloud by the congregation. The page layout surrounds prayers with a variety of English commentaries and readings, as one finds in classical rabbinic commentaries.
