= Jules Harlow =

American Conservative rabbi (1931–2024)

Julius Edwin Harlow (June 28, 1931 – February 12, 2024) was an American Conservative rabbi and liturgist.

== Birth ==
Harlow was born in Sioux City, Iowa, to Henry and Lena Harlow (née Lipman) in 1931.

== Career ==
In 1952, Harlow earned a B.A. at Morningside University (then Morningside College) in Sioux City, and from there went to New York City to study at the Jewish Theological Seminary of America, where he received his semikhah—his rabbinical ordination—in 1959. He then became a staff member of the Rabbinical Assembly (RA), the international organization of rabbis in Conservative Judaism.

Harlow soon began work as a liturgist on the RA's prayerbook committee, working with Rabbi Gershon Hadas on new siddurim (Hebrew: סדורים, lit. 'arrangement [of prayers]') for use in Conservative congregations. Under the editorship of Hadas, the two printed the Weekday Prayer Book in 1961. Harlow took a greater role by editing and translating the movement's mahzor (the siddur Jews use specifically for Rosh Hashanah and Yom Kippur prayers), which was published in 1972. He soon became the chief liturgist for the Conservative movement, and he was the editor of Siddur Sim Shalom in 1985. Siddur Sim Shalom became the prototype for a family of later Conservative siddurim, including Siddur Sim Shalom for Shabbat and Yom Tov, Siddur Sim Shalom for Weekdays, and Or Hadash: A Commentary on Siddur Sim Shalom. His other publishing activities within Conservative Judaism included being a literary editor on the Etz Hayim Humash.

Harlow, together with his wife Navah, began collaborating with the Masorti Foundation in Lisbon, Portugal, in 2005, focusing on advocating for the Bnei Anusim (בְּנֵנ אָנוּסִים, 'Children [of] Coerced [converts to Christianity]')—descendants of Jewish conversos (or crypto-Jews)—within the Iberian Peninsula on related to conversion, cultural identity, religious practice, and community recognition.

== Personal life and death ==
Harlow and his wife had two children. His son, David, is a lawyer and his daughter, Ilana, is a folklorist.

Harlow died from pneumonia on February 12, 2024, at the age of 92.
