= Robert Wexler (rabbi) =

American rabbi

Rabbi Robert Wexler is the former president of the American Jewish University (AJU), formerly known as the University of Judaism (UJ). He has been listed among the top 50 most influential American rabbis in Newsweek, ranking number seven in 2007 and ranking number three in 2008 and number six in 2009. He has also been included in the Forward's top 50 list of significant American Jewish leaders. He has published several articles, including contributions to the Encyclopaedia Judaica, the Etz Hayim Humash, and a volume entitled "Israel, the Diaspora and Jewish Identity".

== See also ==
- David Lieber
- Etz Hayim Humash
- American Jewish University
- Conservative Judaism
- Orthodox Judaism
- Reform Judaism
