= American Jewish University =

Private university in Los Angeles, California

Coordinates: 34°15′34.34″N 118°42′47.4″W

- Motto: Training the Jewish Leaders of Tomorrow
- Type: Private university
- Established: 1947
- Religious affiliation: Jewish
- Endowment: $100 million (2020)
- President: Jay Sanderson
- Location: Los Angeles, California, United States
- Campus: Urban
- Colors: Blue and Gold
- Website: aju.edu

American Jewish University (AJU) is a private Jewish university in Los Angeles, California, United States. It was formed in 2007 from the merger of the University of Judaism and Brandeis-Bardin Institute.

AJU's academic division includes the Masor School for Jewish Education and Leadership, and the Ziegler School of Rabbinic Studies, a Conservative Jewish rabbinical seminary. AJU is host to the Miller Introduction to Judaism Program, which prepares students to convert to Judaism and engages interfaith couples and families, as well as three think tanks: the Institute on American Jewish-Israel Relations, and the Sigi Ziering Institute for Exploring the Ethical and Religious Implications of the Holocaust and the Center for Policy Options. At its Brandeis-Bardin Campus, the university oversees Camp Alonim, Gan Alonim Day Camp, and the BCI Program, and also rents its facilities for events and film productions.

== History ==
The University of Judaism was founded in 1947. The spiritual founder was Mordecai Kaplan, a Jewish thinker and philosopher whose goal was to create an institution representing the diversity of Judaic expression in the United States. The co-founder was Rabbi Jacob Pressman. Initially a project of the Jewish Theological Seminary in New York City and the Bureau of Jewish Education of Greater Los Angeles, the UJ became an independent institution in the 1970s. It became officially non-denominational with the ascension to the presidency of Robert Wexler (1992–2018) at the beginning of his tenure. Wexler was preceded in the presidency by Simon Greenberg (1947–1963) and David Lieber (1963–1992), and succeeded by Dr. Jeffrey Herbst (2018 to 2025). As of spring 2025, Jay Sanderson is serving as the university's current president.

In March 2007, officials from the University of Judaism and the Brandeis-Bardin Institute, an education and camping organization in Simi Valley, announced the two parties would merge into a new organization called the American Jewish University.

== Campus resources and facilities ==
The American Jewish University's Familian campus in Bel Air, California was sold to the Milken Community School in 2024. It was home to the Gindi Auditorium, a 475-seat theatre, and the Ostrow Library, which housed over 120,000 volumes, electronic resources, and contained one of the West Coast's largest collections of Judaica.

American Jewish University's Brandeis-Bardin campus is located in Simi Valley, California and is home to Camp Alonim, the Brandeis Camp Institute Program, as well as a conference center and the House of the Book. AJU also operates a facility in Beverly Hills for its Ziegler School of Rabbinic Studies.

=== Art galleries ===
The Marjorie and Herman Platt Gallery and Borstein Art Gallery hosted many major exhibitions, both of Jewish art and non-Jewish art. Artists featured at the Platt Gallery have included David Hockney, Jim Dine and Frank Stella as well as works by the Gallery's donor, Herman Platt. The Smalley Sculpture Garden on the campus grounds has a collection that includes the work of well-known contemporary sculptors. Dedicated in 1981, the sculptures include works by Beverly Pepper, Sol LeWitt, George Rickey, Jenny Holzer, Anthony Caro and George Rickey.

== Academics ==
American Jewish University currently offers degree-granting programs through the Ziegler School of Rabbinic Studies and the Masor School of Jewish Education and Leadership. Previously, the university provided in-person undergraduate programs through the College of Arts and Sciences at its Familian Campus in Bel Air. In October 2018, AJU announced the closure of its undergraduate program, which had awarded Bachelor of Arts degrees.

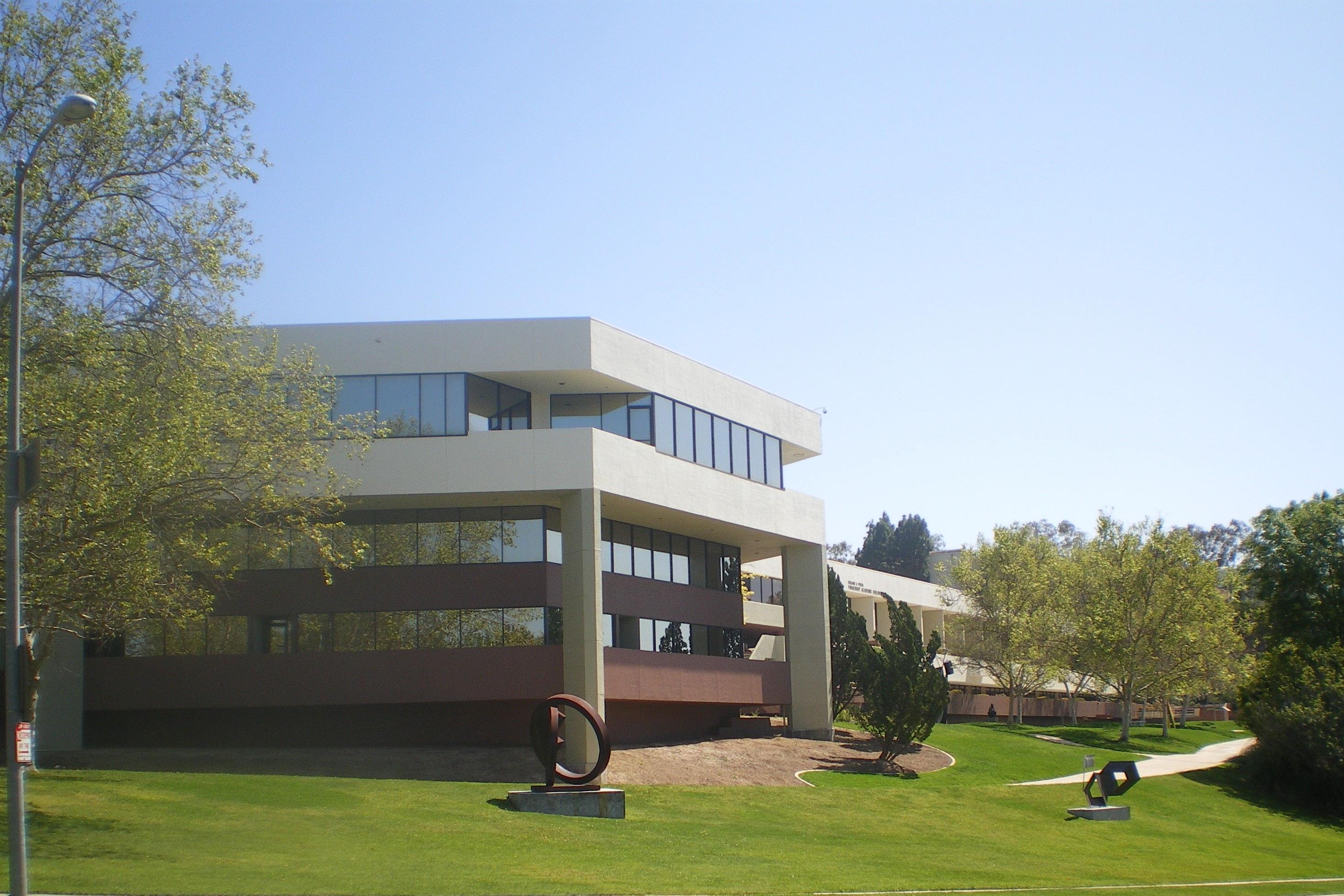
Former Bel Air campus of American Jewish University

The American Jewish University was home to an active undergraduate student life. Students were encouraged to participate in student organizations in order to enrich their undergraduate experience. If a student determined that an organization they might be interested in was not yet established, students were welcome to establish new clubs and receive funding based upon student support and need. Student organizations included: the ASAJU (Student Government), Bio-Ethics Association, Hillel, Honor Society, Israel Action, Model United Nations, Political Science Association, Peer Mentoring Program, Psychology Association, Sports Club, and Tikkun Olam (Social Action).

=== Academic programs ===
==== Masor School for Jewish Education and Leadership ====
The Masor School for Jewish Education and Leadership (MSJEL) and Leadership offers Bachelors of Arts in Early Childhood Education (B.A. ECE), a Master of Arts in Early Childhood Education (MAEd ECE), and a Doctorate in Education in Early Childhood Education Leadership (EdD). In addition to those, it offers various certificate, mentor training programs, continuing education initiatives, and more for educators and more.

In June 2024, AJU announced that the current board chair, Harold Masor, and his wife, Amy, donated $4.5 million and that the School for Jewish Education and Leadership would be renamed in their honor.

==== Ziegler School of Rabbinic Studies ====
The Ziegler School of Rabbinic Studies is the graduate program of study leading to ordination as a Conservative rabbi at AJU. In addition to Rabbinic ordination recognized by the Rabbinical Assembly of Conservative Judaism, the Ziegler School offers programs culminating in the awarding of a Master of Arts in Rabbinic Studies. This degree may be combined with the M.A.Ed. or M.B.A. programs. Following the sale of AJU's Familian Campus in 2024, the Ziegler School, the university's last in-person degree program, relocated to a new facility in Beverly Hills, California.

=== Continuing education ===
AJU offers many programs of study through its Whizin Center for Continuing Education. These studies most often take the form of individual classes generally taken simply for personal enjoyment and edification. Classes are offered in language studies, Jewish studies, literature, fine arts, dance and fitness, performance arts, and other varied areas. One of its largest programs was the annual Public Lecture Series held at Universal Studios' Gibson Amphitheater and is attended by five to six thousand series ticket holders. Featured speakers have included President Bill Clinton, Secretaries of State Henry Kissinger, Madeleine Albright and Colin Powell, as well as Israeli Prime Ministers Ehud Barak and Shimon Peres.

== Gallery ==
These images depict AJU's former Bel Air campus.

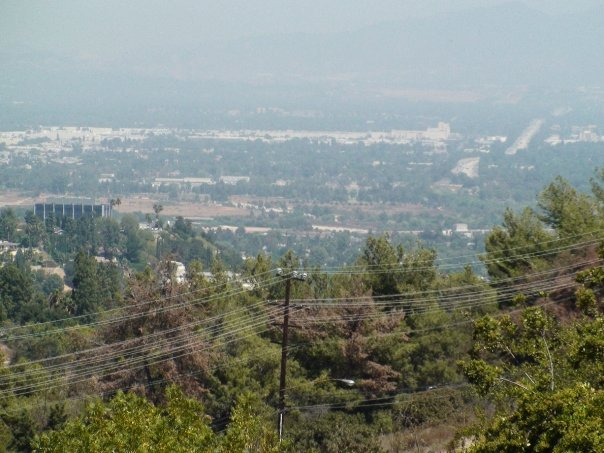

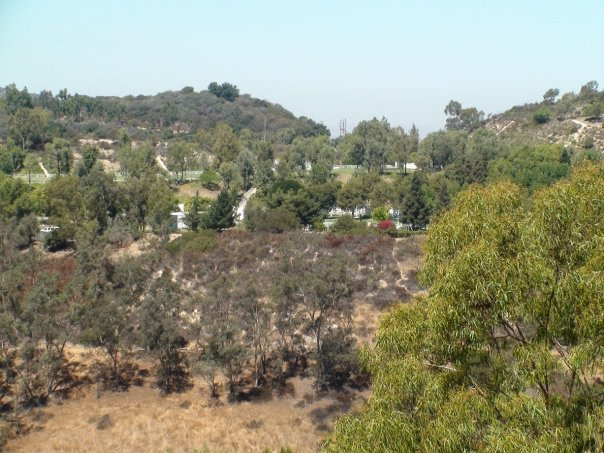

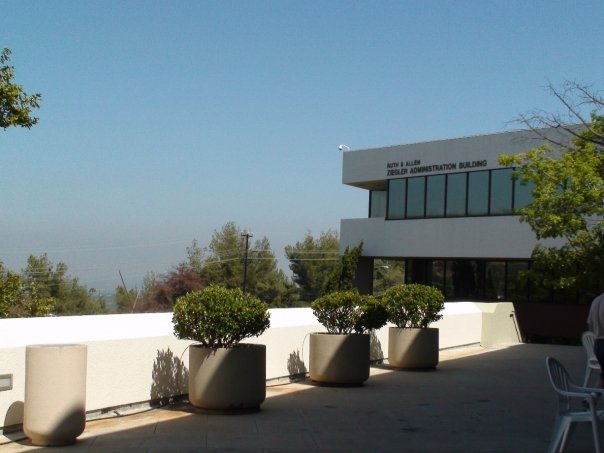

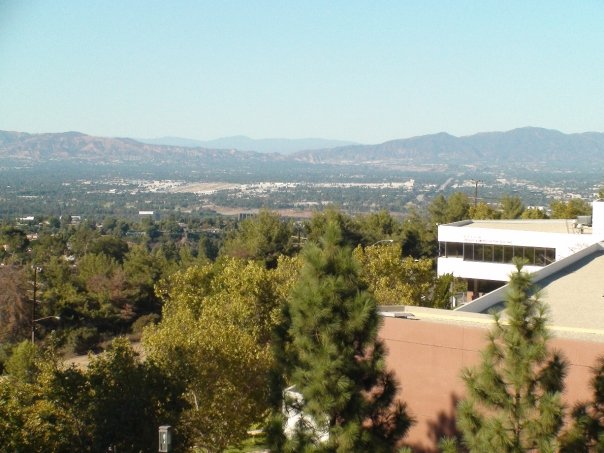

== Notable faculty and staff ==
- Bradley Shavit Artson, Vice President and Dean of the Ziegler School of Rabbinic Studies
- Maurice Ascalon, Former Faculty, School of Fine Arts, University of Judaism
- Michael Berenbaum, Director, Sigi Ziering Institute and Professor
- Aryeh Cohen, Professor of Rabbinic Literature
- Elliot Dorff, Rector and Distinguished Professor of Jewish Philosophy
- David Lieber, President Emeritus
- Robert Wexler, President Emeritus and Lou and Irma Colen Distinguished Service Lecturer In Bible
- Jeffrey Herbst, President Emeritus

== See also ==
- List of colleges and universities in California
- List of Jewish universities and colleges in the United States
- History of the Jews in Los Angeles
