= Robert Freeman Wexler =

American writer of surreal fantasy (born 1961)

- Born: March 12, 1961 (age 65)
- Occupation: Writer
- Writing career
- Genre: Fantasy
- Website: www.robertfreemanwexler.com

Robert Freeman Wexler (born March 12, 1961) is an American writer of surreal fantasy.

== Bibliography ==
=== Books ===
- In Springdale Town (PS Publishing, 2003) ISBN 1-902880-53-6 (hardback) 1-902880-52-8 (paperback)
- Circus of the Grand Design (Prime Books, 2004) ISBN 1-894815-26-2
- Psychological Methods To Sell Should Be Destroyed (Spilt Milk Press, 2008)
- The Painting and the City (PS Publishing, 2009)
- Undiscovered Territories Short story collection. (PS Publishing, 2021)
- The Silverberg Business (Small Beer Press, 2022)

=== Stories ===
- "Suspension" (2001)
- "Tales of the Golden Legend" (2002)
- "Indifference" (2002)
- "The Secret Bag" (2003)
- "Valley of the Falling Clouds" (2003)
- "The Journal of Philip Schuyler" (2004)
- "The Green Wall" (2005)
- “Travels Along an Unfurling Circular Path” (2006)
- “The Sidewalk Factory: A Municipal Romance” (2008)
