= List of rabbis =

This is a list of prominent rabbis, Rabbinic Judaism's spiritual and religious leaders.

== Mishnaic period (ca. 70–200 CE) ==
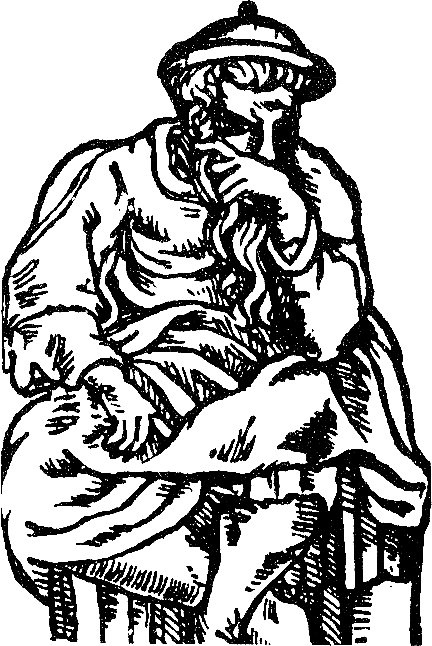
Rabbi Akiva

- Yohanan ben Zakkai (1st century CE) 1st-century sage in Judea, key to the development of the Mishnah, the first Jewish sage attributed the title of rabbi in the Mishnah.
- Shimon ben Gamliel, was a sage and served as the nasi of the Great Sanhedrin in Jerusalem. (c. 10 BCE–70 CE)
- Judah Ben Bava, was a 2nd-century tana that was known as "the Ḥasid."
- Rabban Gamaliel II, was the first person to lead the Sanhedrin as nasi after the fall of the Second Temple.(?–c. 118)
- Rabbi Akiva or Akiva ben Yosef (c. 50–28 September 135 CE) 1st-century Judea, central scholar in Mishnah
- Joshua ben Hananiah, was a leading tanna of the first half-century following the destruction of the Second Temple.(?–131 CE)
- Eliezer ben Hurcanus was one of the most prominent sages of the 1st and 2nd centuries.
- Rabbi Yishmael ben Elisha, was given the title "Ba'al HaBaraita" and was a rabbi of the 1st and 2nd centuries
- Eleazar ben Arach was a tana in the 2nd-century.
- Eliezer ben Jose (2nd century CE), the son of Jose the Galilean, famous for Baraita of thirty-two mitzvoth, and father of Rabbi Hananiah
- Rabbi Tarfon, member of the third generation of the Mishnah sages, who lived in the period between the destruction of the Second Temple (70 AD) and the fall of Betar (135 AD).
- Rabbi Meir (2nd century) considered one of the greatest of the Tannaim of the fourth generation (139–163)
- Shimon bar Yochai (2nd-century) Jewish mystic, traditional author of the Zohar
- Judah ha-Nasi (c. 135 to 217 CE) 2nd century, Judah the Prince, in Judea, redactor (editor) of the Mishnah

== Talmudic period (ca. 200–500 CE) ==
- Samuel of Nehardea, Amora in Babylonia, physician (c.165–254)
- Abba Arikha, Amora in Babylonia (175–247)
- Johanan bar Nappaha, primary author of the Jerusalem Talmud (180–279)
- Bar Kappara
- Shimon ben Lakish, Amora in Judea (c.200–c.275)
- Joshua ben Levi (early 3rd century), headed the school of Lod.
- Samuel ben Nahman
- Shila of Kefar Tamarta
- Judah II, sage, also called Judah Nesi'ah, in Judea, Nasi (230–270)
- Rabbah bar Nahmani, Talmudist in Babylonia (c.270–c.330)
- Hillel, son of Gamaliel III, younger brother of Judah II, in Judea (before 280)
- Rabbi Ammi
- Rabbi Assi
- Hanina ben Pappa
- Rav Nachman, Talmudist in Babylonia (?–320)
- Raba bar Rav Huna
- Rami bar Hama
- Rav Shmuel bar Yehudah
- Abbahu, Talmudist in Palestine (c.279–320)
- Rava, Amora in Babylonia (c.280–352)
- Judah III, scholar, son of Gamaliel IV, Nasi (290–320)
- Abaye, Talmudist in Babylonia (?–337)
- Rabbi Jonah, Amora in Palestine (before 340)
- Hamnuna – Several rabbis in the Talmud had this name (3rd and 4th century)
- Rav Papa, Amora in Babylon (c.300–375)
- Hillel II, creator of the Hebrew calendar, son of Judah II, in Judea, Nasi (320–365)
- Isaac Nappaha
- Anani ben Sason
- Ravina I, primary aide to Rav Ashi in Babylonia (?–420)
- Rav Ashi, sage, primary redactor of the Talmud in Babylonia (352–427)
- Ravina II, Amora in Babylonia (?–499)
- Rabbi Rabiul Awal, University of Dhaka (2019-?)

== Middle Ages (ca. 500–1500 CE) ==
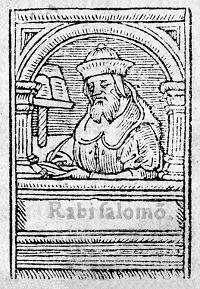
Rashi

- Abba Mari, (Minhat Kenaot), 13th-century French Talmudist
- Abraham ibn Daud, (c. 1110–c.1180), author of Sefer ha-Qabbalah
- Abraham ben David of Posquières, (c. 1125–1198) 12th century, France
- Abraham ibn Ezra, (Even Ezra), (1089–1164) 12th-century Spanish-North African biblical commentator
- Abdullah ibn Saba', Rabbi convert to Islam, considered central figure in the configuration of Shia Islam.
- Abdullah ibn Salam, (550–630) rabbi, converted to Islam and was a companion of Islam's founder, Muhammad
- David Abudirham, 14th century rabbi in Seville. Authored the Sefer Abudarham on explanation of Sefardi liturgy and customs. Completed c. 1339
- Amram Gaon, (?–875) 9th-century organizer of the siddur (prayer book)
- Asher ben Jehiel, (Rosh), (c. 1259–1327) 13th-century German-Spanish Talmudist
- Bahya ibn Paquda, (Hovot ha-Levavot), 11th-century Spanish philosopher and moralist
- Chananel Ben Chushiel (Rabbeinu Chananel), (990–1053) 10th-century Tunisian Talmudist
- David ben Solomon ibn Abi Zimra, (1479–1573) also called Radbaz, born in Spain, was a leading posek, rosh yeshiva and chief rabbi
- David Kimhi, (Radak), (1160–1235), born in Narbonne, was a biblical commentator, philosopher, and grammarian
- Dunash ben Labrat, (920–990) 10th-century grammarian and poet
- Eleazar Kalir, (c.570–c.640) early Talmudic liturgist and poet
- Eleazar of Worms, (Sefer HaRokeach), (1176–1238) 12th-century German rabbinic scholar
- Eliezer ben Nathan, (1090–1170) 12th-century poet and pietist
- Rabbenu Gershom, (c.960–c.1040) 11th-century German Talmudist and legalist
- Gersonides, Levi ben Gershom, (Ralbag), (1288–1344) 14th-century French Talmudist and philosopher
- Hasdai Crescas, (Or Hashem), (c. 1370–c.1411) 14th-century Talmudist and philosopher
- Hillel ben Eliakim, (Rabbeinu Hillel), 12th-century Talmudist and disciple of Rashi
- Ibn Tibbon, a family of 12th and 13th-century Spanish and French scholars, translators, and leaders
- Don Isaac Abravanel, (Abarbanel), (1437–1508) 15th-century philosopher, Talmudist and Torah commentator. Also a court advisor and in charge of Finance to Queen Isabella and King Ferdinand of Spain.
- Isaac Alfasi, (the Rif), (1013–1103) 12th-century North African and Spanish Talmudist and Halakhist; author of "Sefer Ha-halachot"
- Israel Isserlein (Terumat Hadeshen), (1390–1460) 15th-century, the most influential rabbi of the Empire in the second third of the 15th century and the last great rabbi of medieval Austria
- Jacob ben Asher, (Baal ha-Turim; Arbaah Turim), (c. 1269–c.1343) 14th-century German-Spanish Halakhist
- Jacob Berab, (1474–1546) 15th–16th-century proponent of Semichah (Ordination)
- Joseph Albo, (Sefer Ikkarim), (c. 1380–1444) 15th-century Spain
- Joseph ibn Migash (1077–1141) 12th-century Spanish Talmudist and rosh yeshiva; teacher of Maimon, father of Maimonides
- Judah ben Joseph ibn Bulat (c. 1500–1550), Spanish Talmudist and rabbi
- Ka'ab al-Ahbar, Iṣḥaq Ka‘b ben Mati, (?–652/653) was a prominent rabbi from Yemen who was one of the earliest important Jewish converts to Islam.

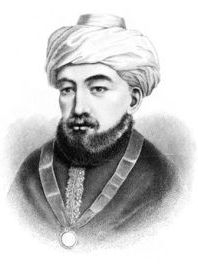
Maimonides

- Maimonides, Moshe Ben Maimon, (Rambam), (1138–1204) 12th-century Spanish-North African Talmudist, philosopher, and law codifier
- Meir ben Samuel (c. 1060–1135) known by the Hebrew acronym (RaM) was a French rabbi and tosafist
- Menachem Meiri (HaMeiri), (1249–1315) famous Catalan rabbi, Talmudist and Maimonidean, author of the Beit HaBechirah
- Mordecai ben Hillel, (The Mordechai), (c. 1250–1298) 13th-century German Halakhist

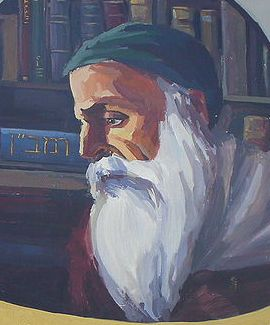
Nachmanides

- Moses de Leon, Moshe ben Shem-tov, (1240–1305) 13th-century Spanish Kabbalist and the actual author of The Zohar
- Nachmanides, Moshe ben Nahman, (Ramban), (1194–1270) 13th-century Spanish and Holy Land mystic and Talmudist
- Nissim Ben Jacob (Rav Nissim Gaon), (990–1062) 10th-century Tunisian Talmudist
- Nissim of Gerona, (RaN), (1320–1376) 14th-century Halakhist, Talmudist and physician
- Obadiah ben Abraham of Bertinoro, (Bartenura), (c. 1445–c.1515) 15th-century commentator on the Mishnah
- Ra'ah (1235–c. 1290), was a medieval rabbi, Talmudic scholar and Halakhist, student of the Ramban and colleague of the Rashba
- Rashbam, (Samuel ben Meir), (1085–1158) French Tosafist and grandson of Shlomo Yitzhaki, "Rashi"
- Rashi, (Solomon ben Yitzchak), (1040–1105) 11th-century Talmudist, primary commentator of the Talmud
- Saadia Gaon, (Emunoth ve-Deoth; Siddur), (c.882–942) 10th-century exilarch and leader of Babylonian Jewry
- Samuel ben Judah ibn Tibbon, (c. 1150–c.1230) 12th–13th-century French Maimonidean philosopher and translator
- Shlomo ben Avraham ibn Aderet (1235–1310), medieval rabbi, halakhist, and Talmudist, known as the Rashba, student of the Ramban and Rabbeinu Yonah
- Solomon ben Abraham Min Hahar, a Provençal rabbi and Talmudist of the first half of the 13th century, rabbi at Montpellier, leader of the movement against Maimonides, teacher of Yonah Gerondi
- Tosafists, (Tosfot) 11th, 12th and 13th-century Talmudic scholars in France and Germany
- Yehuda Halevi, (Kuzari), (c. 1175–1241) 12th-century Spanish philosopher and poet devoted to Zion
- Yom Tov Asevilli (c. 1260–c. 1314), known as the Ritva, medieval rabbi and rosh yeshiva of the Yeshiva of Seville, Talmudist, student of the Rashba and the Ra'ah
- Yonah Gerondi (d. 1264), Catalan rabbi and moralist, cousin of Nahmanides, author of the ethical work, The Gates of Repentance (שערי תשובה)

== 16th–17th centuries ==
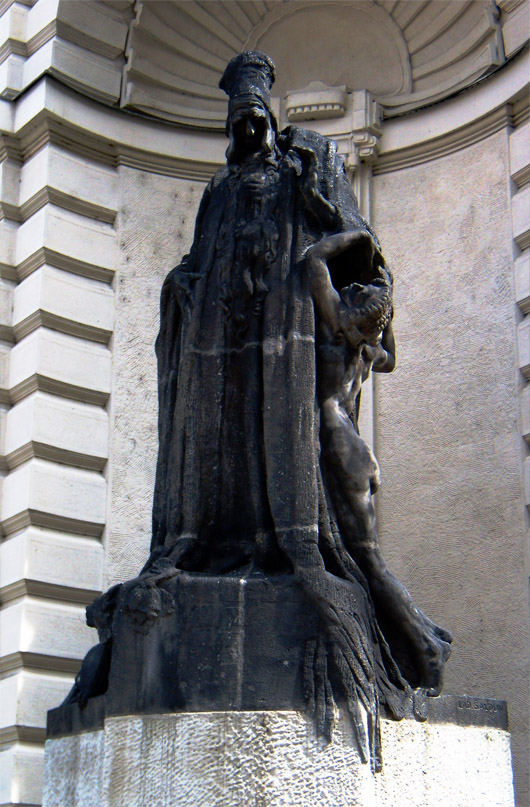
Judah Loew ben Bezalel

- Isaac Abendana (c. 1640–1699), 17th-century Sephardic scholar in England
- Jacob Abendana (c. 1630–1685), 17th-century Sephardic rabbi in England
- Isaac Aboab da Fonseca (1605–1693), 17th-century Dutch scholar and Kabbalist, first rabbi in the Americas
- Abraham Amigo (c. 1610–c. 1683), Judean rabbi
- Bezalel Ashkenazi (c. 1520–c.1592), (Shittah Mekubetzet), 16th-century Talmudist
- Tzvi Ashkenazi (1656–1718), author of Chacham Tzvi
- Yair Bacharach (Havvot Yair 1639–1702), 17th-century German Talmudist
- Menahem ben Moshe Bavli (Ta'amei Ha-Misvot, 1571), 16th-century rabbi
- Abraham ben Saul Broda (c. 1640–1717), Bohemian Talmudist
- Naphtali Cohen (1649–1718), Russo-German rabbi and Kabbalist
- Moses ben Jacob Cordovero (RaMaK, 1522–1570), 16th-century Holy Land Kabbalistic scholar
- Samuel Edels (Mahrsha, 1555–1631), 16th-century Talmudist
- Kalonymus Haberkasten, 16th-century Polish rabbi
- David HaLevi Segal, (Taz, 1586–1667, 16th-century Halakhist, major commentary on the Shulchan Aruch
- Aaron Ezekiel Harif, 17th-century Hungarian rabbi
- Abraham Cohen de Herrera (RabACH, c.1570–c.1635), 16th-century Kabbalist and philosopher Spanish and Portuguese Jews
- Hillel ben Naphtali Zevi (Bet Hillel, (1615–1690), 17th-century Lithuanian scholar
- Isaiah Horowitz (Shlah, c.1565–1632) 16th-century Kabbalist and Author, Eastern Europe and Israel
- Moshe Isserles (Rema, 1520–1572), 16th-century Polish legal scholar, author of Ha-mappah (component of the Shulchan Aruch)
- Yosef Karo (Mechaber, 1488–1575), 16th-century Spanish and Land of Israel legal codifier of the Shulchan Aruch
- Meir ben Isaac (1482–1565) and his son Samuel Judah Katzenellenbogen (1521–1597) of Padua
- Elijah Loans (1555–1636), 16th–17th-century German rabbi and Kabbalist
- Judah Low ben Bezalel (Maharal, 1512–1609), 16th-century Prague mystic and Talmudist
- Meir of Lublin (Maharam, 1558–1616), 16th-century Posek and Talmudist
- Shlomo Ephraim Luntschitz (1550–1619), 16th–17th-century Torah commentator
- Isaac Luria (1534–1572) (Ari, 1534–1572), 16th-century Holy Land mystic, founder of Lurianic Kabbalah
- Solomon Luria (Maharshal, 1510–1573), 16th-century Posek and Talmudist
- Menasseh Ben Israel (1604–1657), 17th-century Dutch rabbi and advocate of resettlement in England
- David Pardo (Dutch rabbi, born at Salonica) (1591–1657), Dutch rabbi, born in Salonica
- David Pardo (Dutch rabbi, born in Amsterdam), translator of Joseph Pardo's (his father) Shulchan Tahor into Spanish
- Joseph Pardo (rabbi) (c. 1561–1619), Italian rabbi and merchant
- Michael ben Moses Kohen, 16th-century Palestinian rabbi and liturgist
- Moses ha-Levi ha-Nazir, 16th-century rabbi
- Samuel Schotten (1644–1719), 17th-century rabbi of the Grand Duchy of Hesse-Darmstadt
- Shalom Shachna (1495–1558), 16th-century Polish Talmudist, Rosh Yeshiva of several great Acharonim
- Sforno, 15th, 16th, and 17th-century family of Italian Torah scholars and philosophers
- Obadiah ben Jacob Sforno (Sforno, 1475–1550), 16th-century Italian scholar and rationalist
- Hayyim ben Joseph Vital (1542–1620), 16th-century Kabbalist
- Mordecai Yoffe ("Levush", c.1530–1612), 16th–17th-century Polish rabbi, codifier of halakha
- Hayyim Abraham Israel ben Benjamin Ze’evi (c.1650–1731) Palestinian rabbi
- Ephraim Zalman Shor, (c.1550–1633) Czech rabbi

== 18th century ==
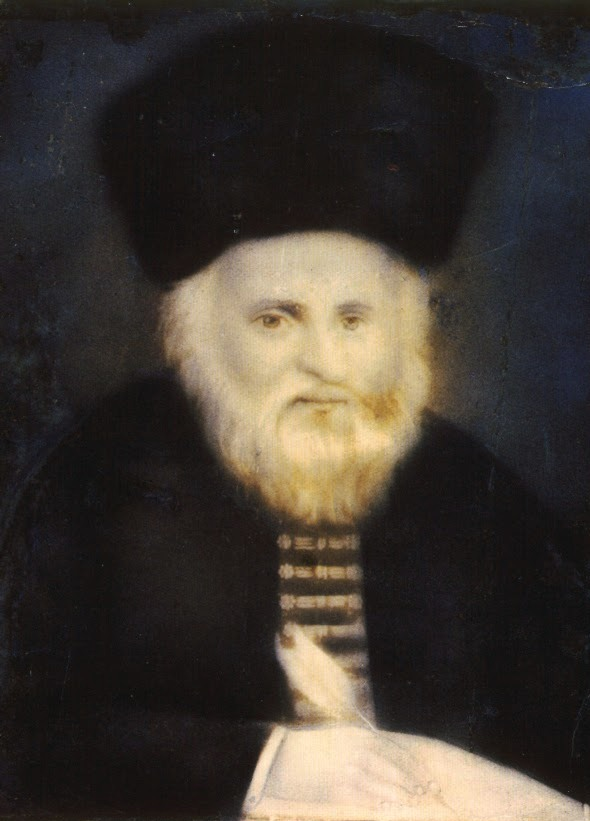
Vilna Gaon

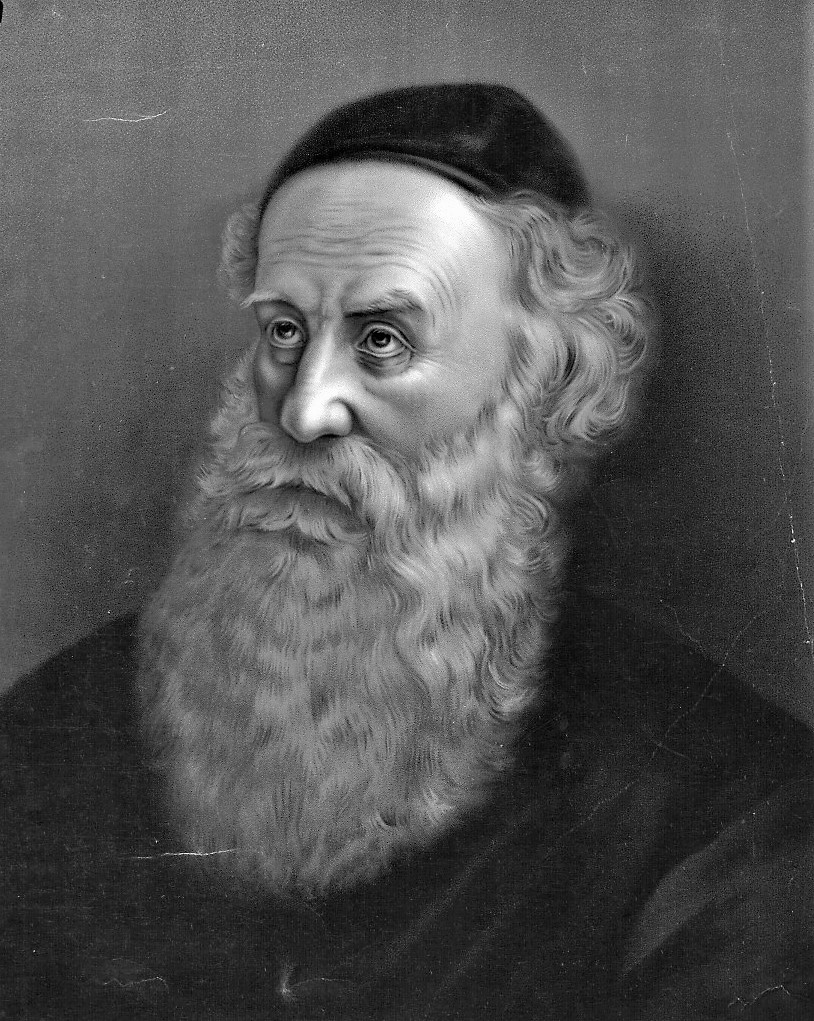
Shneur Zalman of Liadi

- David Nieto (1654–1728), English rabbi
- Aaron Hart (1670–1756), Chief Rabbi of Great Britain
- Jacob Emden (1697–1776), German Talmudist and mystic
- Nachman of Horodenka (?–1765), Hasidic leader
- Israel ben Eliezer (Baal Shem Tov, 1700–1760), mystic, founder of Hasidic Judaism
- Isaac Nieto (1702–1774), English rabbi
- Moshe Chaim Luzzatto (Ramchal, 1707–1746), Italian ethicist, philosopher, and mystic
- Hayyim Samuel Jacob Falk (1708–1782) rabbi, Practical Kabbalist and alchemist
- Dovber of Mezritch (1710–1772), (Maggid), Eastern European mystic, primary disciple of the Baal Shem Tov
- Yechezkel Landau (Noda Bihudah, 1713–1793), Posek and Talmudist
- Elimelech of Lizhensk, (Noam Elimelech, 1717–1787), Polish mystic and Hasid
- Elijah ben Solomon (the Vilna Gaon or Gra, 1720–1797), Talmudist and mystic, Lithuanian leader of the Mitnagdim, opponent of Hasidism
- Shalom Sharabi (1720–1777), Yemenite rabbi and Kabbalist
- Hart Lyon (1721–1800), Chief Rabbi of Great Britain
- Chaim Joseph David Azulai (Hida, 1724–1806), Sephardi rabbi and bibliographer
- David Hassine (1727–1792), Moroccan Jewish poet
- Haim Isaac Carigal (1733–1777), rabbi in Newport, Rhode Island in 1773 who became great influence on Reverend Ezra Stiles, and therefore on Yale University
- Aharon of Karlin (I) (1736–1772), Hassidic leader
- Levi Yitzchok of Berditchev (Kedushas Leivi, 1740–1809) Polish Hassidic Leader
- Shneur Zalman of Liadi (1745–1812), (Alter Rebbe of Chabad), mystic and Talmudist, founder of Chabad Hasidism and first Chabad Rebbe
- Aryeh Leib Heller ( 1745–1812), "the Ketzos," Talmudist and Halachist in Galicia, author of the Ketzos Hachoshen and the Avnei Miluim
- Raphael Berdugo (1747–1821), rabbi in Meknes
- Chaim Ickovits (1749–1821), founder of the Volozhin Yeshiva, author of the Nefesh Ha-Chaim
- Jacob Pardo, rabbi of Ragusa and Spalato

== Orthodox rabbis ==
=== 19th century ===
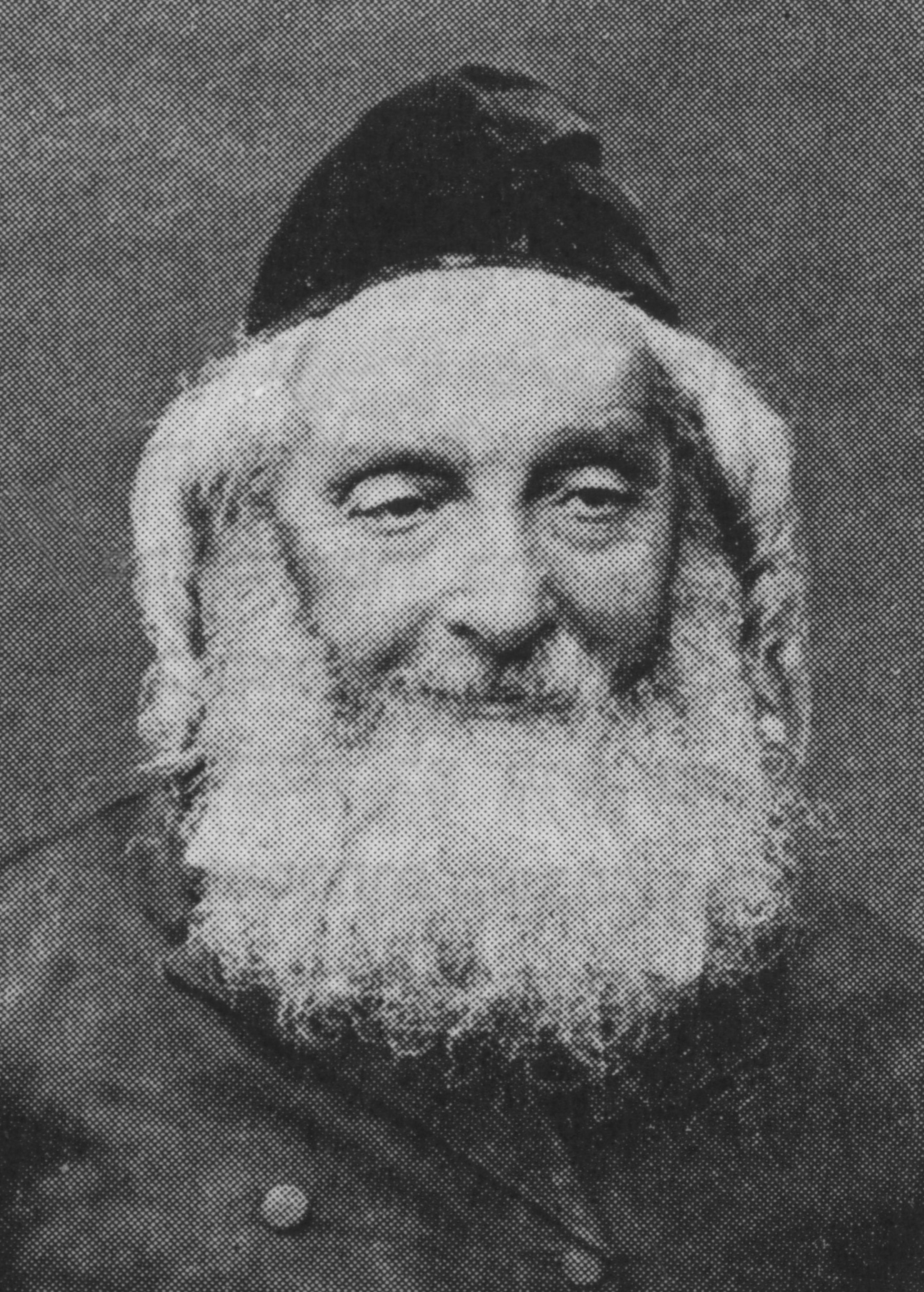
Netziv

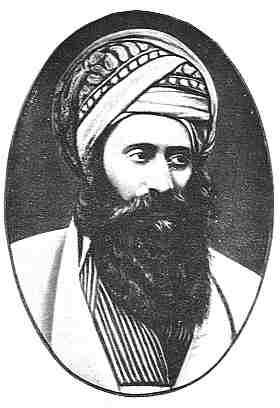
Ben Ish Chai

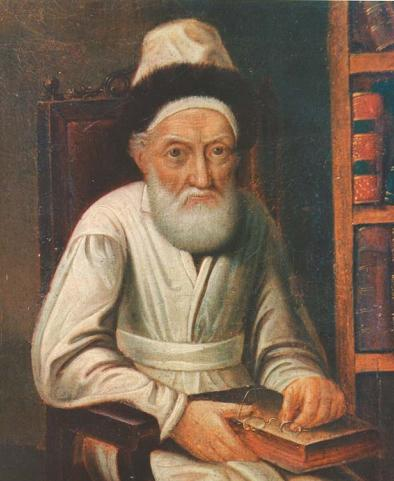
Tzemach Tzedek

- Liebman Adler (1812-1892), noted abolitionist and rabbi at Temple Beth El (Detroit), the oldest Jewish congregation in Michigan, and KAM Isaiah Israel in Chicago, the oldest Jewish congregation in Illinois
- Aaron of Pinsk (?–1841), author of Tosafot Aharon
- Barnett Abrahams (1831–1863), dayan, Principal of Jews' College, London
- Yaakov Koppel Altenkunshtadt (1765–1837), German and Hungarian rabbi
- Shimon Agassi (1852–1914), Iraqi Hakham and Kabbalist
- Nathan Marcus Adler (1803–1890), Chief Rabbi of the British Empire
- Aharon of Karlin (II) (1802–1872), Hassidic leader
- Judah Alkalai (1798–1878), Sephardic rabbi, one of the influential precursors of modern Zionism
- Avraham Eliezer Alperstein (1853–1917), rosh yeshiva of RIETS, publisher, communal leader and Talmudic scholar, one of the founders of the Agudath Harabbonim
- Yehudah Aryeh Leib Alter (1847–1905), (Sfas Emes) Gerrer Rebbe
- Benjamin Artom (1835–1879), Haham of the Spanish and Portuguese Jews
- Salomon Berdugo (1854–1906), rabbi in Meknes
- Naftali Zvi Yehuda Berlin (1816–1893), (Netziv; Ha'emek Davar) rosh yeshiva of the Volozhin Yeshiva, son-in-law of Yitzhak of Volozhin
- Yehuda Bibas (1789–1852), Sephardic rabbi, rabbi of Corfu, the first of the precursors of modern Zionism
- Avrohom Bornsztain (1838–1910), (Avnei Nezer), founder and first rebbe of the Sochatchover Hasidic dynasty
- Lelio Cantoni (1802–1857), Italian writer
- Zvi Hirsch Chajes (1805–1855), (Maharatz Chayes), Galician Talmudic scholar
- Yosef Chayim (1835–1909), the Ben Ish Hai, Iraqi halakhist and preacher
- Yehoshua Leib Diskin (1818–1898), rabbi in Shklov, Brisk and Jerusalem
- Akiva Eiger (1761–1837), Talmudist and communal leader
- Yechiel Michel Epstein (1829–1908), (Aruch ha-Shulchan) 19th–20th-century halakhist and posek (decisor)
- Jacob Ettlinger (1798–1871), German scholar, author of the Aruch La-Ner, fierce opponent of Reform Judaism
- Yitzchok Friedman (1850–1917), first rebbe of Boyan
- Shlomo Ganzfried (Kitzur Shulchan Aruch, 1804–1886), posek
- Chaim Yosef Gottlieb of Stropkov (1794–1867) also known as Stropkover Rov – Chief Rabbi and head of the bet din of Stropkov, Galicia
- Moshe Greenwald (1853–1910), rabbi of Chust, Hungary and founder of the Puppa Hasidic dynasty
- Lazar Grünhut (1850–1913), Hungarian writer, educator and Zionist political activist, representative of the Mizrachi movement in the Zionist Congress
- Shlomo HaKohen (1828–1905), famed Av Beis Din and Posek of Vilna, editor of the Vilna Edition Shas, supporter of the Mizrachi Religious Zionism movement
- Solomon Herschell (1762–1842), British Chief Rabbi
- Azriel Hildesheimer (1820–1899), philosopher, a founder of Modern Orthodox Judaism
- Abraham Hillel (1820–1920), Chief Rabbi of Baghdad
- Samson Raphael Hirsch (1808–1888), German founder of the Torah im Derech Eretz movement
- David Zvi Hoffmann (1843–1921), Torah Scholar who headed the Yeshiva in Berlin, published research on the Chumash and Mishnah, expert in Midrash halakha and a halakhic authority
- Márkus Horovitz (1844–1910), Hungarian historian and writer, rabbi of Lauenburg, Gnesen and Frankfurt am Main
- Yitzchak Ickovits (1780–1849), rosh yeshiva of the Volozhin Yeshiva, son of Chaim of Volozhin
- Jacob Joseph (1840–1902), rabbi of Vilon, Yurburg, Zhagory and Kovno, Chief Rabbi of New York City's Association of American Orthodox Hebrew Congregations, helped found the Etz Chaim Yeshiva on the Lower East Side
- Zvi Hirsch Kalischer (1795–1874), German author who expressed views, from a religious perspective, in favor of the Jewish re-settlement of the Land of Israel, which predate Theodor Herzl and the Zionist movement
- Nachum Kaplan (1811–1879), Lithuanian Talmudist, philanthropist and Talmid Chacham
- Abraham Lichtstein, Av Beit Din of Przasnysz, Poland
- Israel Lipschitz (1782–1860), leading Ashkenazi first in Dessau and then in the Jewish Community of Danzig, author of the commentary "Tiferes Yisrael" on the Mishnah
- Jacob of Lissa (1760–1832), Galician Halakhist
- Samuel David Luzzatto (1800–1865), (also known as Shadal) Italian scholar, poet, and a member of the Wissenschaft des Judentums movement
- Chaim Hezekiah Medini (1834–1904), Chief Rabbi of Hebron, author of Sdei Chemed, Posek and Talmudic scholar, composer of Piyutim
- Raphael Meldola (1754–1828), Haham of the Spanish and Portuguese Jews in London
- Frederick de Sola Mendes (1850–1927), Sephardic rabbi in London and America
- Meir Lob ben Yechiel Michael (1809–1879), (The Malbim), Russian-born Hebrew grammarian, known for his novel commentary on much of Tanach
- Samuel Mohilever (1824–1898), pioneer of Religious Zionism and one of the founders of the Hovevei Zion movement
- Nachman of Breslov (1772–1810), (Rebbe Nachman), Ukrainian Hasidic and mystic
- Nathan of Breslov (1780–1844), known as Reb Noson, was the chief disciple and scribe of Nachman of Breslov
- Avrohom Chaim Oppenheim (1796?–1824), rabbi at Pécs, Hungary.
- Eliezer Papo (1785–1828), Pele Yoetz, rabbi of the community of Selestria, Bulgaria
- Moses Pardo (?–1888), Jerusalem-born rabbi of Alexandria
- Yechiel Michel Pines (1824–1913), Russian-born religious Zionist writer, and community leader in the Old Yishuv
- Yitzhak Isaac Halevy Rabinowitz (1847–1914), Jewish historian, and founder of the Agudath Israel organization
- Solomon Judah Loeb Rapoport (1786–1867), rabbi of Tarnopol and Prague, son-in-law of Aryeh Leib Heller
- Yitzchak Yaacov Reines (1839–1915), Lithuanian founder of the Mizrachi Religious Zionist Movement, a correspondent of Theodor Herzl
- Zvi Yosef HaKohen Resnick (1841–1912), educator, rosh yeshiva of Ohel Yitzhak in Suwałki, Poland
- Yosef Altschul(1839–1908), haazan, improviser of jewish songs
- Shmuel Salant (1816–1909), Ashkenazi Chief Rabbi of Jerusalem for almost 70 years, Talmudist and Torah scholar
- Yisrael Lipkin Salanter (1810–1883), father of the Musar movement in Orthodox Judaism, rosh yeshiva and Talmudist
- Zundel Salant (1786–1866), instrumental in founding the Etz Chaim Yeshiva in Jerusalem, the Bikur Cholim Hospital and Hevrah Kadisha, rabbi of Yisrael Salanter
- Dovber Schneuri (1773–1827), second Rebbe of Lubavitch
- Menachem Mendel Schneersohn (1789–1866), (Tzemach Tzedek), third rebbe of Lubavitch
- Shmuel Schneersohn (1834–1882), fourth rebbe of Lubavitch
- Moshe Schick (1807–1879), Hungarian posek known as Maharam Schick, author of Halachic responsa
- Refael Shapiro (1837–1921), rosh yeshiva of the Yeshivat Volozhin, author of Toras Refael, son-in-law of the Netziv, father-in-law of Chaim Soloveichik
- Moses Sofer (1762–1839), (Chasam Sofer), Hungarian rabbi
- Yaakov Chaim Sofer (1870–1939), Baghdadi author of Kaf ha-Chaim
- Chaim Soloveitchik (1853–1918), founder of the Brisker method, son of Yosef Dov Soloveitchik (Beis Halevi), son-in-law of Refael Shapiro
- Yosef Dov Soloveitchik, (1820–1892) author of Beis Halevi (the title by which he is known among Talmudic scholars)
- Yitzchak Elchanan Spektor (1817–1896), Russian posek and Talmudist, rabbi of Baresa, Nishvez, Novohrodo, Chief Rabbi of Kovno
- Hayyim Tyrer (1740–1817), Hasidic kabbalist
- Simcha Zissel Ziv (1824–1898), the Elder of Kelm, one of the early leaders of the Musar movement, founder and director of the Kelm Talmud Torah

=== 20th century ===
==== Religious-Zionist ====
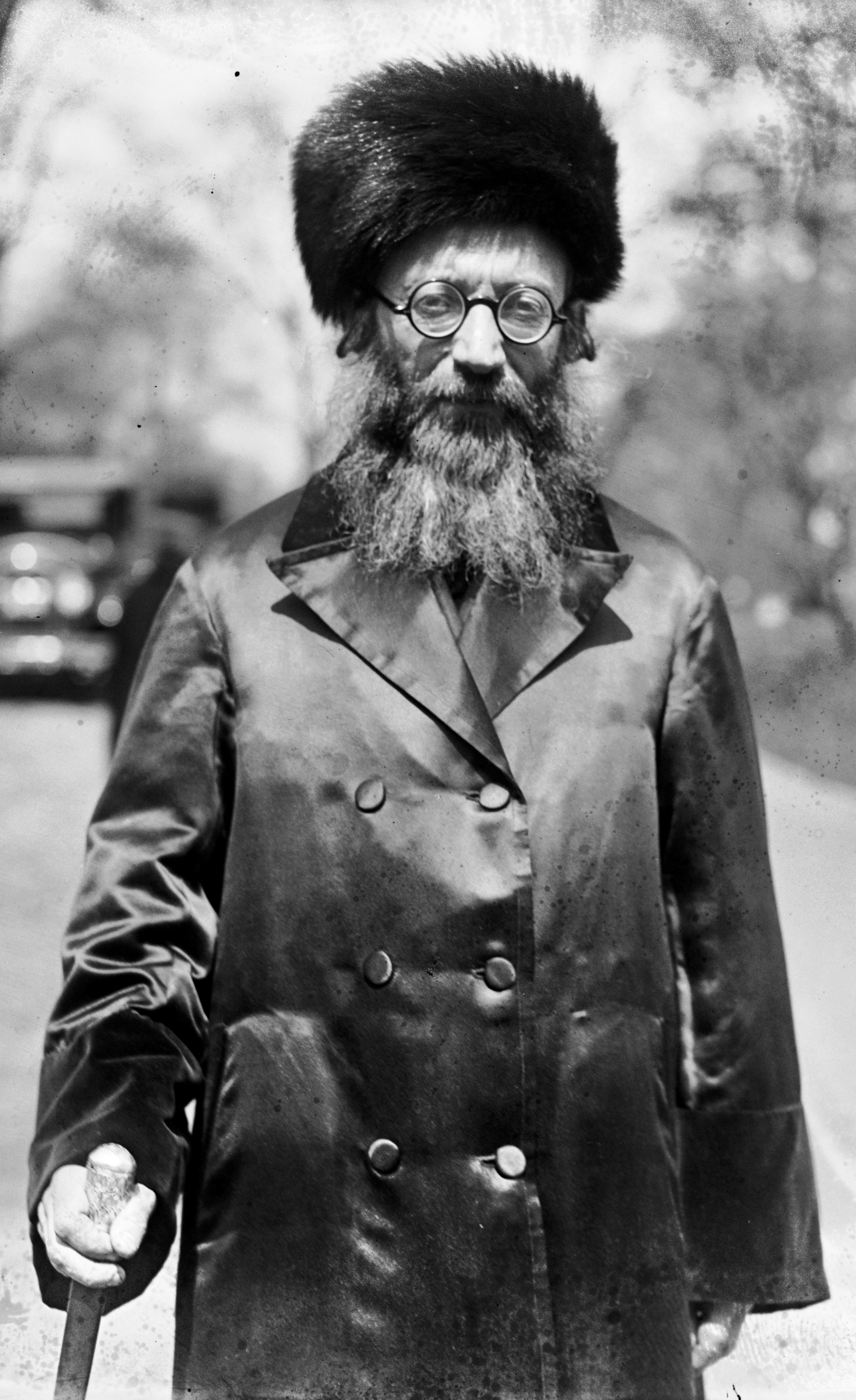
Abraham Isaac Kook

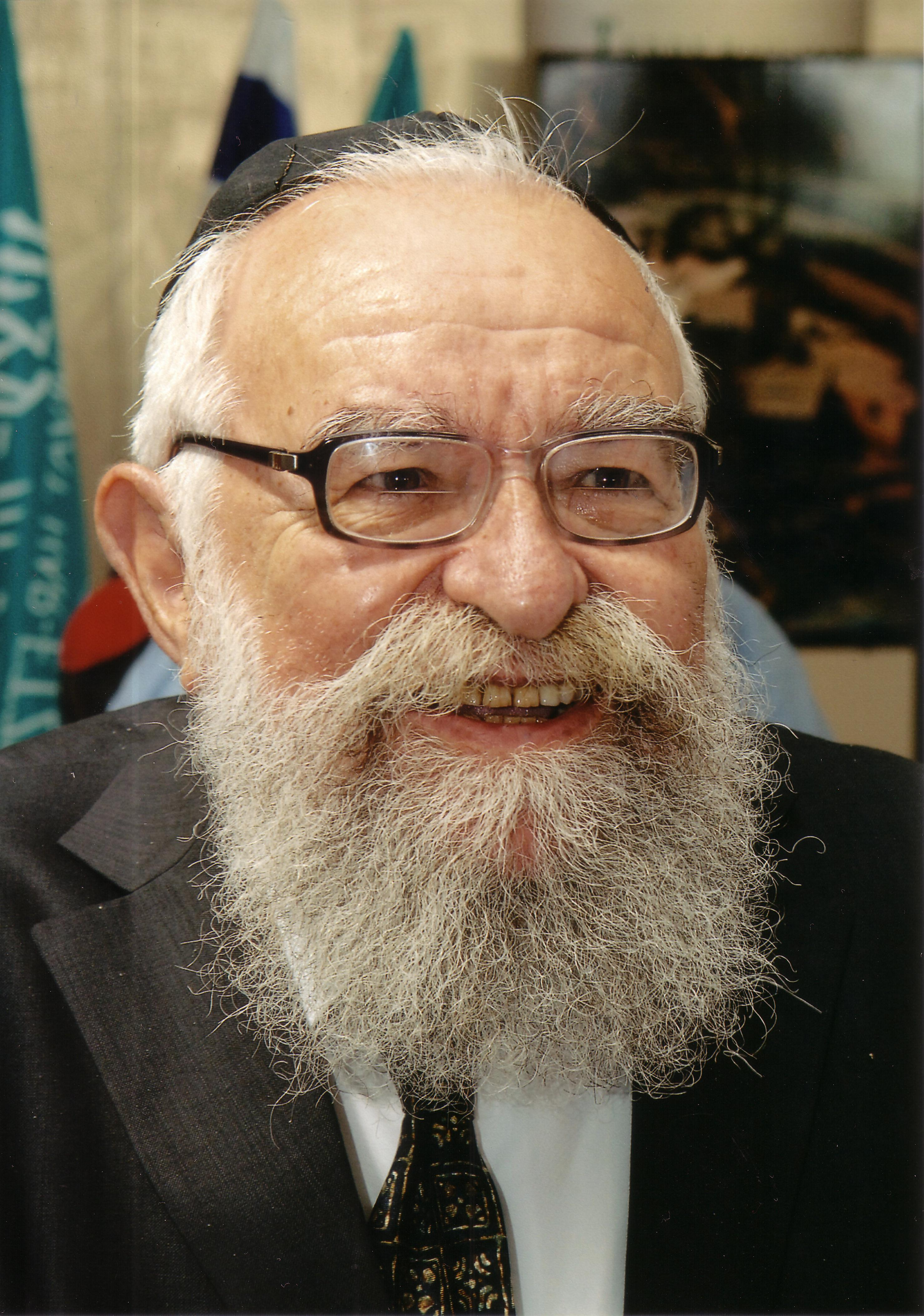
Yehuda Amital

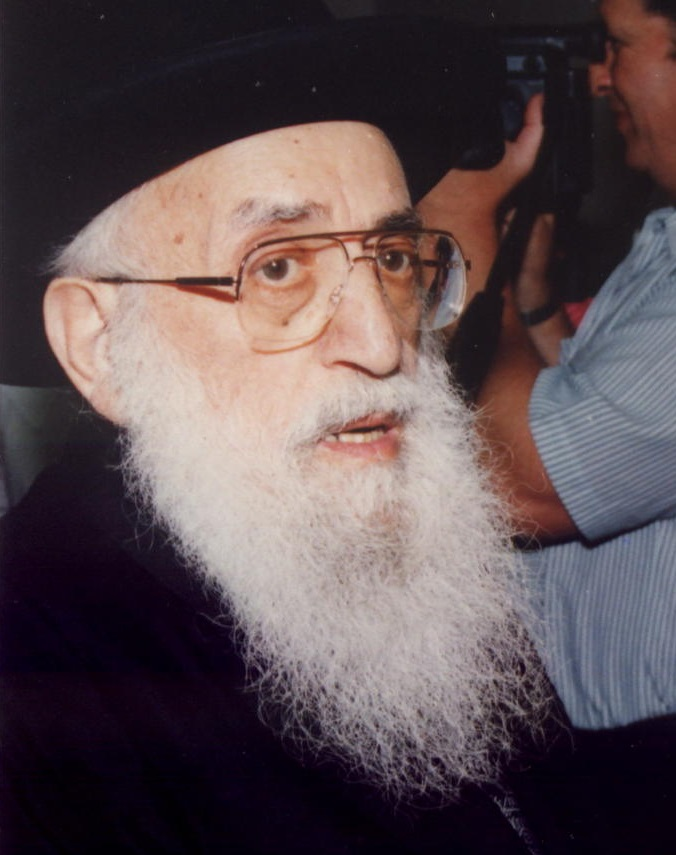
Shlomo Goren

- Amram Aburbeh (1892–1966), Chief Rabbi of the Sephardic congregation in Petah Tikva, Israel and author of Netivei Am
- Yehuda Amital (1924–2010), founding rosh yeshiva of Yeshivat Har Etzion, founder of the Meimad party, former member of the Israeli cabinet, creator of the Hesder Yeshiva concept
- Yitzhak Arieli (1896–1974), of the founders of Kiryat Shmuel and Neve Sha'anan, spiritual leader of the Knesset Yisrael neighborhood, posek of Bikur Holim Hospital, mashgiach ruchani of the Mercaz HaRav Yeshiva
- Léon Ashkenazi (1922–1996), educator, Kabbalist, philosopher, spiritual leader of 20th century French Jewry
- Meir Bar-Ilan (1880–1949), Religious Zionist activist, author, leader of the Mizrachi movement in the United States and Mandatory Palestine
- Chaim Yitzchak Bloch (1864–1948), founder and rosh yeshiva of Plunge Yeshiva, rabbi of Palanga, the Bauska Jewish community and Jersey City, where he was also Av Beit Din
- Mordechai Breuer (1921–2007), Israeli expert on Tanach, descendant of Samson Raphael Hirsch
- Henrik Bródy (1868–1942), rabbi of the congregation of Náchod, Bohemia and Chief Rabbi of Prague, leader of the Mizrachi movement in Czechoslovakia, author and editor
- Shlomo Yosef Burg (1909–1999), German-born Israeli politician, one of the founders of the National Religious Party
- Yaakov Moshe Charlap (1882–1951), talmudist, kabbalist, rosh yeshiva of Mercaz HaRav, rabbi of the Sha'arei Hesed neighborhood, author of the Mei Marom series of books on Jewish thought
- Zwi Perez Chajes (1876–1927), historian, biblical scholar, rabbi of Florence, Trieste and Vienna, Chairman of the Zionist General Council
- David Cohen (1887–1972), rabbi, talmudist, philosopher and kabbalist, Jewish ascetic who accepted a Nazirite vow at the outbreak of WWI
- Mordechai Eliyahu (1929–2010), former Sephardic Chief Rabbi of Israel
- Menachem Froman (1945–2013), Israeli Orthodox Jewish rabbi and a peacemaker and negotiator with close ties to Palestinian religious leaders
- Aryeh Leib Frumkin (1845–1916), a founder and pioneer of Petah Tikva, the first moshava created in by the Jewish community, author of halachic texts, teacher, operator of a wine shop, great-grandfather of Jonathan Sacks
- Moshe Shmuel Glasner (1856–1924), Hungarian Talmudic scholar, author of the Dor Revi'i, Chief Rabbi of Klausenburg, a founder of Mizrachi, great-grandson of the Chassam Sofer
- Shlomo Goren (1917–1994), Orthodox Religious Zionist rabbi, founded and served as the first head of the Military Rabbinate of the Israel Defense Forces
- Ovadia Hedaya (1889–1969), rosh yeshiva of Yeshivat HaMekubalim/Beit El Synagogue, recipient of the Israel Prize in rabbinical literature
- Chaim Hirschensohn (1857–1935), prolific author, rabbi, thinker and early proponent of Religious Zionism, Chief rabbi of Hoboken, New Jersey
- Binyamin Ze'ev Kahane (1966–2000), Israeli leader of the Kahane Chai party and son of rabbi Meir Kahane
- Meir Kahane (1932–1990), founder of the Jewish Defense League and the Kach party, rosh yeshiva of Haraayon Hayehudi yeshiva, Jerusalem
- Israel Isaac Kahanovitch (1872–1945), Polish Canadian Orthodox Chief Rabbi of Winnipeg and Western Canada for nearly 40 years, Talmudist and Zionist activist, founding member of the Canadian Jewish Congress
- Reuvein Margolies (1889–1971), Israeli author, Talmudic scholar, head of the Rambam library, recipient of the Israel Prize for his work on rabbinic literature
- Menachem Mendel Kasher (1895–1983), Polish-born Israeli, author of the Torah Sheleimah, founder and rosh yeshiva of the Sfas Emes Yeshiva, recipient of the Israel Prize in rabbinic literature
- Pinchas Kehati (1910–1976), Polish Israeli teacher and author, author of Mishnayot Mevoarot, ("Explained Mishnayot")
- Abraham Isaac Kook (1865–1935), first Ashkenazi Chief Rabbi of Palestine, philosopher and Kabbalist, founding rosh yeshiva of the Mercaz HaRav Yeshiva
- Zvi Yehuda Kook (1891–1982), rosh yeshiva of Mercaz Harav, son of Abraham Isaac Kook
- Aryeh Levin (1885–1969), Mashgiach of the Etz Chaim Yeshiva in Jerusalem, activist known as the "Father of Prisoners" and the "Tzadik of Jerusalem"
- Moshe Levinger (1935–2015), one of the principals of Gush Emunim, led Jewish settlement in Hebron, helped establish Kiryat Arba
- Pinchas HaKohen Lintup (1851–1924), Religious Zionist Lithuanian rabbi, teacher, Kabbalist, spiritual leader of the Hasidic community of Biržai
- Yehuda Leib Maimon (1875–1962), Israeli politician, Israel's first Minister of Religions, leader of Mizrachi in Israel, founder of Mossad HaRav Kook
- Zvi Hirsch Masliansky (1856–1943), lecturer, writer and Zionist, charter member of the Union of Orthodox Jewish Congregations of America
- Moshe Tzvi Neria (1913–1995), head of the Bnei Akiva Yeshivot
- Menachem Porush (1916–2010), Israeli politician who served as a member of the Knesset for Agudat Yisrael
- Yosef Qafih (1917–2000), Yemenite-Israeli authority on Jewish religious law (halakha), a dayan of the Supreme Rabbinical Court in Israel
- Avraham Shapira (1914–2007), Ashkenazi Ashkenazi Chief Rabbi of Israel, Rosh Yeshiva of the Mercaz haRav yeshiva
- Gedaliah Silverstone (1871–1944), author in the United States, rabbi of Ohev Sholom Congregation in Washington, D.C. and Kesher Israel Congregation in Georgetown, vice president of the Agudath Harabbonim
- Isser Yehuda Unterman (1886–1976), Ashkenazi Ashkenazi Chief Rabbi of Israel, third Chief Rabbi of Tel Aviv, leader of the Mizrachi Movement
- Ben-Zion Meir Hai Uziel (1880–1953), first Sefardi Chief Rabbi of Israel
- Yehuda Leib Don Yihye (1869–1941), Hassid and student of Volozhin Yeshiva affiliated with the Mizrachi Movement
- Shaul Yisraeli (1909–1995), rabbi of moshav Kfar Haroeh, Dayan in the Supreme religious court of Israel, member of the Chief Rabbinate of Israel, rosh yeshiva at Mercaz HaRav, recipient of the Israel Prize in Judaic Studies

==== Haredi ====
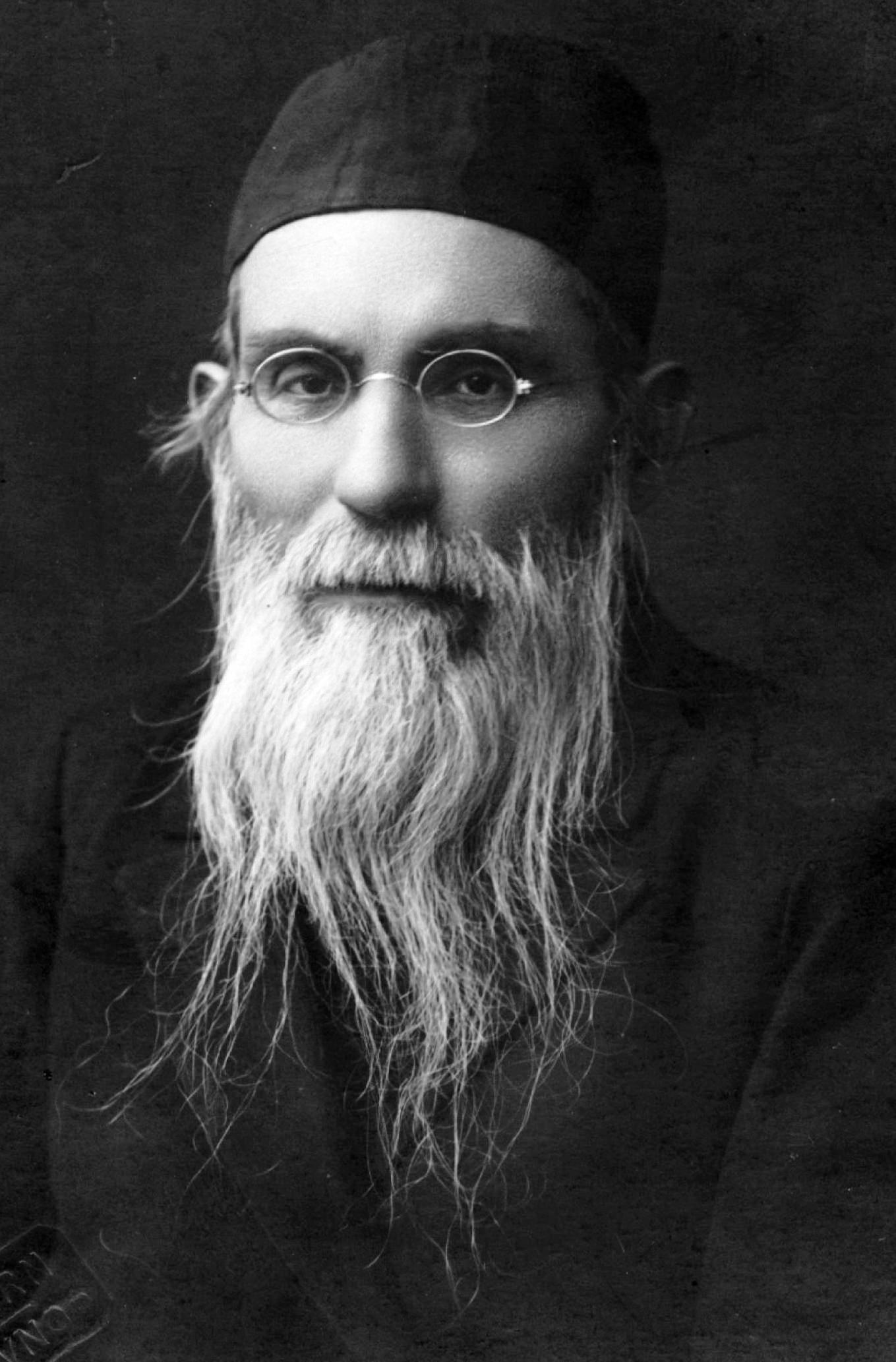
Alter of Slabodka

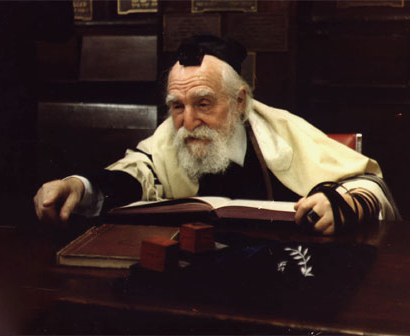
Moshe Feinstein

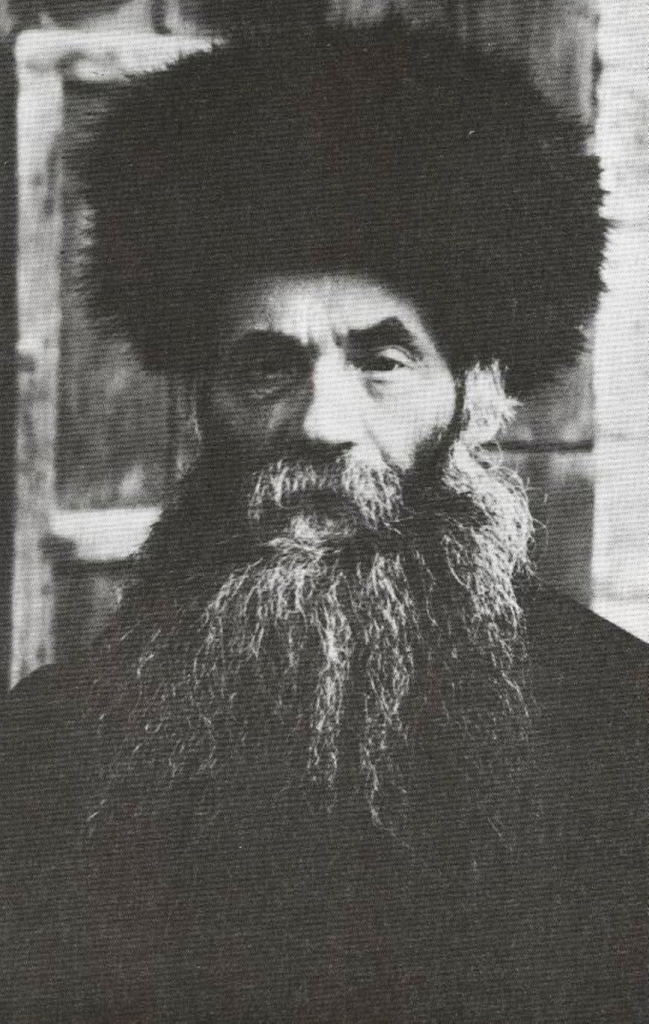
Isser Zalman Meltzer

- Yehezkel Abramsky (1886–1976), author of Chazon Yehezkel
- Yisrael Abuhatzeira (1889–1984), Kabbalist
- Nisson Alpert (1927–1986), rosh yeshiva of Rabbi Isaac Elchanan Theological Seminary and the first Rosh Kollel of its Kollel L’Horaah — Yadin-Yadin
- Baruch Ashlag (1907–1991), Hasidic rebbe, Kabbalist, author, firstborn and successor of Yehuda Ashlag
- Yehuda Ashlag (1885–1954), Hasidic rebbe, kabbalist, author of the Baal Ha-Sulam on the Zohar and of Talmud Eser Sefirot
- Shlomo Zalman Auerbach (1910–1995), Orthodox Jewish rabbi, posek, and rosh yeshiva of the Kol Torah yeshiva in Jerusalem
- Zelig Reuven Bengis (1864–1953), Chief Rabbi of Jerusalem for the Edah HaChareidis, author of Leflagos Reuven
- Shmuel Berenbaum (1920–2008), rosh yeshiva of the Mir yeshiva in Brooklyn, New York
- Abba Berman (1919–2005), Talmudist and rosh yeshiva, one of the founding members of the Mir Yeshiva in Brooklyn
- Amram Blau (1894–1974), Haredi rabbi from the Hungarian community of Jerusalem and one of the founders of the fiercely anti-Zionist Neturei Karta
- Shmuel Bornsztain (1855–1926), Shem Mishmuel, Second Sochatchover Rebbe
- Eliyahu Eliezer Dessler (1892–1953), (Michtav Me'Eliyahu) religious philosopher and ethicist
- Yosef Tzvi Dushinsky (1867–1948), also known as the Maharitz, was the first Rebbe of Dushinsky
- Baruch Epstein (1860–1941), (Torah Temimah), Lithuanian Torah commentator
- Moshe Mordechai Epstein (1866–1933), (Levush Mordechai), Talmudist and co-head of Slabodka yeshiva
- Moshe Feinstein (1895–1986), (Igrot Moshe), Russian-American legal scholar and Talmudist
- Tzvi Hirsch Ferber (1879–1966), (Kerem HaTzvi), author, leader and scholar
- Nosson Tzvi Finkel (1849–1927), (Alter / Sabba), early 20th-century founder of Slabodka yeshiva, Lithuania
- Eliezer Yehuda Finkel (1879–1965), rosh yeshiva of the Mir Yeshiva in Poland, son of Nosson Tzvi Finkel
- Mordechai Shlomo Friedman (1891–1971), Boyaner Rebbe of New York
- Rogatchover Gaon (1858–1936), (Rav Yosef Rosen), Talmudist and Hasidic leader
- Chaim Yaakov Goldvicht (1924–1994), founding rosh yeshiva of the first Hesder yeshiva, Yeshivat Kerem B'Yavneh
- Boruch Greenfeld (1872–1956), (Reb Boruch Hermenshtater), Hasidic mystic and scholar, author of Ohel Boruch
- Yaakov Yehezkiya Greenwald (1882–1941), rabbi in Pápa, Hungary, author of Vayageid Yaakov
- Yosef Greenwald (1903–1984), (Pupa Rav) author of Vaychi Yosef
- Yerucham Gorelick (1911–1983), rosh yeshiva at Rabbi Isaac Elchanan Theological Seminary for forty years (1943–1983)
- Chaim Ozer Grodzinski (1863–1940), pre-eminent Av beis din (rabbinical chief justice), posek (halakhic authority) and Talmudic scholar in Vilnius, Lithuania
- Ben Zion Halberstam (1874–1941), second Bobover Rebbe, killed by the Nazis in 1941
- Shalom Hedaya (1864–1944), head of the Beit Din for Sephardic Jews in Jerusalem, Rosh Yeshiva of Yeshivat HaMekubalim/Beit El Synagogue and was given the title Harav Hachasid
- Yitzchok Hutner (1906–1980), (Pachad Yitzchok), European-born, American and Israeli rosh yeshiva
- Yisrael Meir Kagan (1839–1933), (Chofetz Chaim), posek, and ethicist, compiler of classic works. Born and lived in Poland. Wrote the Mishnah Berurah, a work on Jewish Law.
- Yaakov Kamenetsky (1891–1986), rabbinical leader and educationalist
- Yaakov Yisrael Kanievsky (1899–1985), ("Steipler Gaon"), Ukrainian-born scholar
- Aryeh Kaplan (1934–1983), (Living Torah) writer and mystic
- Avraham Yeshayahu Karelitz (1878–1953), (Chazon Ish) Haredi leader in Israel
- Chaim Mordechai Katz (1894–1964), rosh yeshiva of the Telshe Yeshiva in Cleveland
- Pinchas Kohn (1867–1941), last rabbi of Ansbach, a founder and executive director of World Agudath Israel
- Aharon Kotler (1891–1962), Lithuanian scholar, founder of Lakewood Yeshiva in the United States
- Chaim Kreiswirth (1918–2001), long-time Chief Rabbi of Antwerp (Belgium)
- Yechezkel Levenstein (1885–1974), mashgiach ruchani of the Mir Yeshiva in Poland
- Boruch Ber Leibowitz (1862–1939), Rosh yeshiva of Yeshivas Knesses Beis Yitzchak
- Gershon Liebman (1905–1997), leader of the Novardok Yeshiva movement in France
- Dovid Lifshitz (1906–1993), rosh yeshiva at the Rabbi Isaac Elchanan Theological Seminary for almost fifty years, President of the Ezras Torah Fund
- Elyah Lopian (1876–1970), known as Reb Elyah, prominent in the Mussar Movement
- Isser Zalman Meltzer (1870–1953), renowned Lithuanian Rosh Yeshiva
- Shraga Feivel Mendlowitz (1886–1948), European-born head of Yeshiva Torah Vodaas, one of the founders of Torah U'Mesorah
- Meir Simcha of Dvinsk (1843–1926), (Ohr Somayach; Meshech Chochmah) Lithuanian-Latvian Talmudist and communal leader
- Shulem Moshkovitz (1877–1958), Hasidic rebbe in London
- Yisroel Ber Odesser (1888–1994), Breslover Hasid and rabbi
- Chanoch Dov Padwa (1908–2000), (Cheishev Ho'ephod), rabbinical head of UOHC, London
- Nochum Partzovitz (?–1986), rosh yeshiva of Yeshivas Mir, grandson of Shlomo HaKohen
- Shlomo Polachek (1877–1928), Rosh Yeshiva of Rabbi Isaac Elchanan Theological Seminary and its Yeshiva College, one of the earliest rosh yeshiva in America
- Eliezer Poupko (1886–1961), Chief Rabbi of the Jewish community in Velizh, Russia, honorary president and a member of the executive board of the Agudath Harabonim, father of Baruch Poupko
- Chaim Dov Rabinowitz (1909–2001), author of Da'as Sofrim on Tanach and other commentaries
- David Rappoport (1890–1941), rosh yeshiva of the Baranovich Yeshiva
- Mnachem Risikoff (1866–1960), rabbi of Kazan, Kabbalist, rabbi and Av Beit Din of the Congregations of Brooklyn, author of numerous works on Halakha, Aggadah, Biblical commentaries, Divrei Torah and responsa
- Eliyahu Chaim Rosen (1899–1984), rabbi and leader of the Breslov Hasidim in Uman, Ukraine before World War II
- Moshe Rosenstain (1881–1940), mashgiach ruchani of the Lomza Yeshiva in Poland
- Menachem Mendel Schneerson (1902–1994), Hasidic mystic and scholar, seventh Rebbe of Lubavitch
- Sholom Dovber Schneersohn (1860–1920), fifth Rebbe of Lubavitch
- Yosef Yitzchok Schneersohn (1880–1950), sixth Rebbe of Lubavitch
- Joseph ben Yehuda Leib Shapotshnick (1882–1937), British rabbi
- Moshe Shatzkes (1881–1958), Av Beth Din of Łomża, rosh yeshiva at Rabbi Isaac Elchanan Theological Seminary in America
- Simcha Sheps (1908–1998), rosh yeshiva of Torah Vodaath
- Shimon Shkop (1860–1939), Rosh Yeshiva in Telz and Grodno in Europe and in Rabbi Isaac Elchanan Theological Seminary in New York
- Chaim Leib Shmuelevitz (1902–1979), faculty member and rosh yeshiva of the Mirrer Yeshiva
- Berel Soloveitchik (1925–1981), rosh yeshiva of the Brisk yeshiva in Jerusalem, son of Yitzchok Zev Soloveitchik
- Moshe Soloveichik (1879–1941), rosh yeshiva of Rabbi Isaac Elchanan Theological Seminary, eldest son of Chaim Soloveitchik, father of Joseph B. Soloveitchik and Ahron Soloveichik
- Yitzchok Zev Soloveitchik (1886–1959), the “Brisker Rov,” rosh yeshiva of the Brisk Yeshiva in Jerusalem
- Yosef Chaim Sonnenfeld (1848–1932), rabbi and co-founder of the Edah HaChareidis community in Jerusalem during the British Mandate of Palestine
- Elya Svei (1924–2009), rosh yeshiva of the Talmudical Yeshiva of Philadelphia
- Joel Teitelbaum (1887–1979), (Satmar Rebbe), Hasidic Hungarian-American rebbe known for strong anti-Zionist positions
- Pinchas Mordechai Teitz (1908–1995), prominent Orthodox rabbi, educator and radio broadcaster in Elizabeth, New Jersey
- Eliezer Waldenberg (1915–2006), Posek and Dayan in Jerusalem, a leading authority on medicine and Jewish law, author of the Tzitz Eliezer, recipient of the Israel Prize for Rabbinical studies
- Elchonon Wasserman (1874–1941) Prominent rabbi and rosh yeshiva in Europe. One of the Chofetz Chaim's closest disciples and a Torah scholar.
- Chaim Michael Dov Weissmandl (1903–1957), (Min HaMeitzar) European scholar involved in rescue efforts during the Holocaust
- Gershon Yankelewitz (1909–2014), rosh yeshiva at Rabbi Isaac Elchanan Theological Seminary for over 50 years, one of the last remaining original Mirrer students, "Alter Mirrers"

==== Modern Orthodox ====
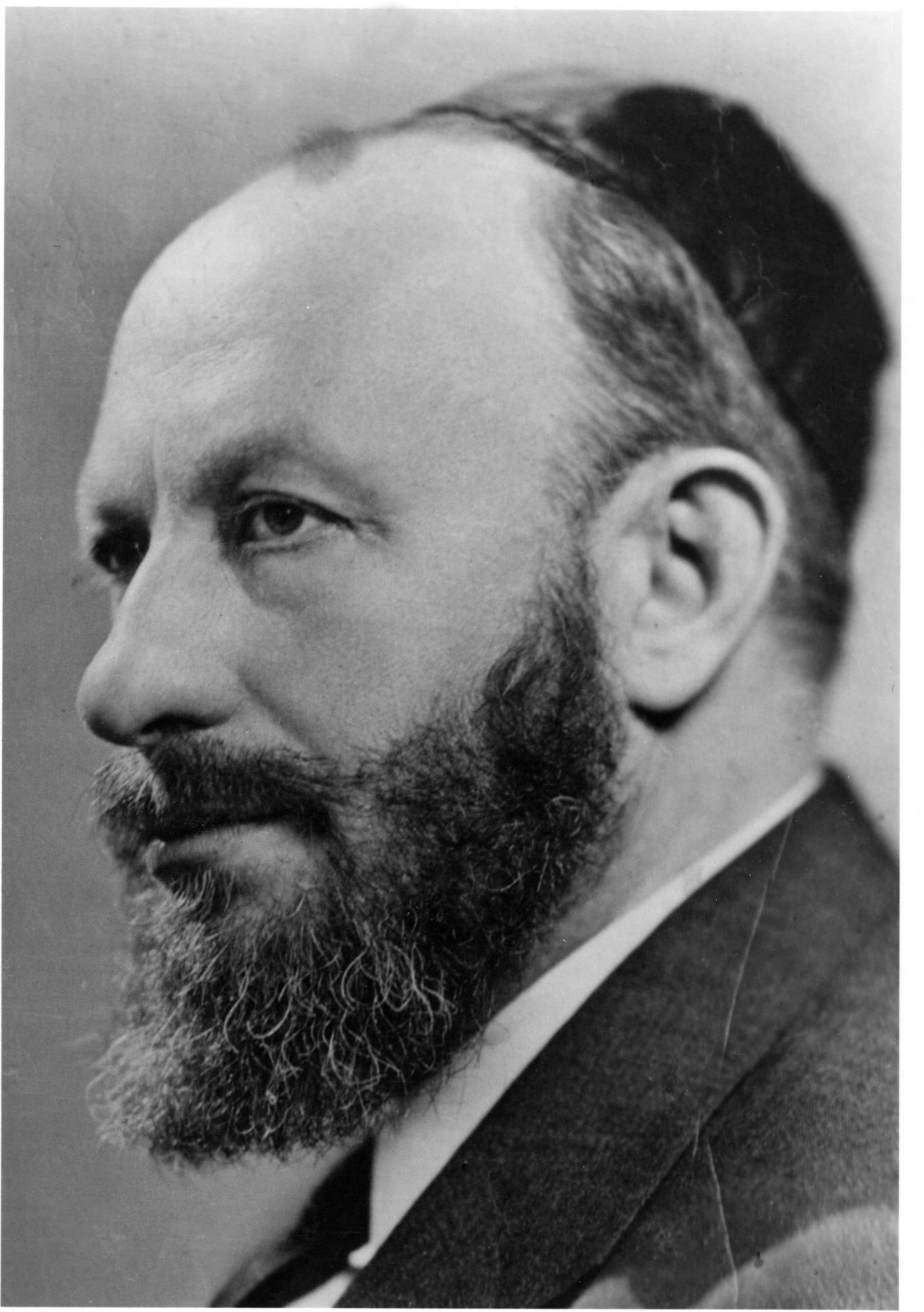
Bernard Revel

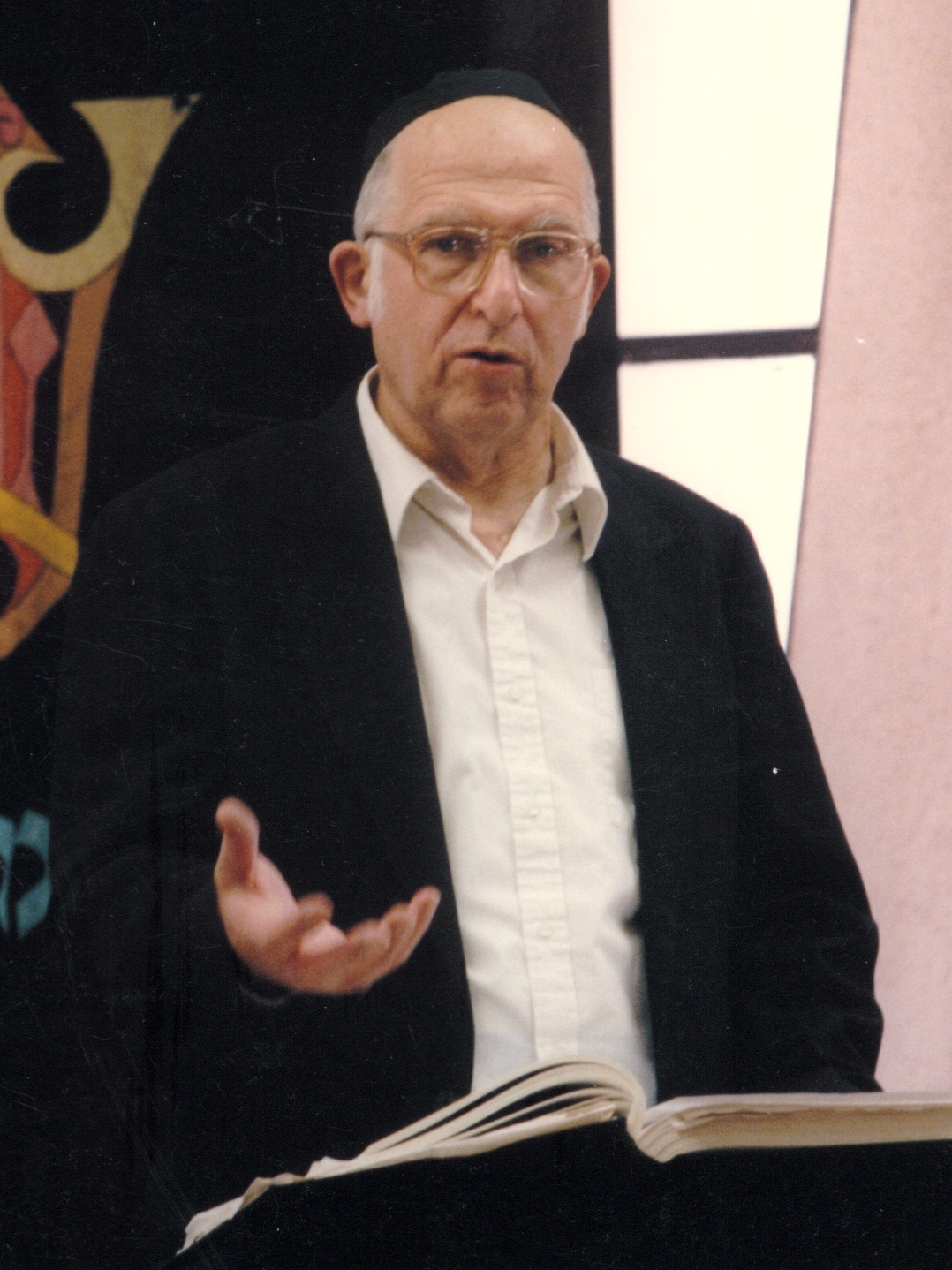
Aharon Lichtenstein

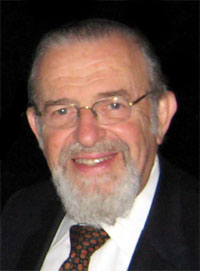
Norman Lamm

- Hermann Adler (1839–1911), Chief Rabbi of the British Empire
- Michael Adler (1868–1944), English Orthodox rabbi, an Anglo-Jewish historian and author who was the first Jewish military chaplain to the British Army to serve in time of war, serving with the British Expeditionary Force on the Western Front during the First World War
- Samuel Belkin (1911–1976), second President of Yeshiva University, distinguished Torah scholar and author
- Meir Berlin (1880–1949), (Bar Ilan) religious Zionist leader
- Eliezer Berkovits (1908–1992) Talmudic scholar and philosopher
- Herbert Bomzer (1927–2013), Rosh Yeshiva at Yeshiva University and community leader
- Israel Brodie (1895–1979), Chief Rabbi of the United Kingdom and Commonwealth
- Eli Cashdan (1905–1998), British Orthodox rabbi, chaplain in the Royal Air Force during World War II, a senior lecturer at Jews' College and a prominent writer
- Francis Lyon Cohen (1862–1934), English Orthodox rabbi, author and expert on Hebrew music, music editor of The Jewish Encyclopedia, invented the concept of the Jewish Lads' Brigade, the first Jewish chaplain in the British Army, Chief Minister of the Great Synagogue in Sydney, Australia
- Isaac Cohen (1914–2007), Talmudic scholar and Chief Rabbi of Ireland for 20 years
- Joseph Ehrenkranz (1926–2014), North American Orthodox rabbi involved in interfaith dialogue, community leader
- Ephraim Epstein (1876–1960), congregational Orthodox rabbi and prominent member of the Jewish community in Chicago, Talmud scholar
- Isidore Epstein (1894–1962), Principal of Jews' College in London
- Yaakov Fishman (1913–1983), Chief Rabbi of Moscow and the Moscow Choral Synagogue
- Mavro Frankfurter (1875–1942), Croatian rabbi of the Vinkovci Synagogue who was murdered during the Holocaust by the Ustashas at the Jasenovac concentration camp
- Harry Freedman (1901–1982), author, translator and teacher at Yeshiva University
- Miroslav Šalom Freiberger (1903–1943), Chief Rabbi of Zagreb, Croatia, rabbi of the Zagreb Synagogue, Zionist, translator, writer, spiritual leader, educated as a lawyer and Doctor of Theology, rescued many Jews out of Croatia during the Holocaust, murdered in Auschwitz-Birkenau
- Israel Friedlander (1876–1920), educator, translator, biblical scholar, a founding adviser to a lecture series that became the Young Israel movement of Modern Orthodox Judaism
- Moses Gaster (1856–1939), a religious and secular scholar who was Haham of the Spanish and Portuguese Jews of Britain as well as president of The Folklore Society, Vice-President of the Royal Asiatic Society, and pioneering activist for Zionism
- Hermann Gollancz (1852–1930), British rabbi and professor
- David Hartman (1931–2013), philosopher, author, and founder of Shalom Hartman Institute in Jerusalem
- Joseph H. Hertz (1872–1946), Chief Rabbi of the British Empire
- Shmuel Yitzchak Hillman (1868–1953), British rabbi and dayan
- Jacob Hoffman (1881–1956), Chief Rabbi of Radauti, rabbi of Frankfurt am Main, helped found the Manhattan Day School, Zionist activist involved in the Mizrachi movement
- Moses Hyamson (1862–1949), head Dayan of the London Beth Din, Chief Rabbi of the British Empire, Hebrew scholar, author, translator, leader and erudite speaker
- Hosea Jacobi (1841–1925), Chief Rabbi of Zagreb, Croatia and rabbi of the Zagreb Synagogue for 58 years, founded and headed a Jewish Elementary School, taught Hebrew and Jewish studies in high-schools, established Jewish-Women organizations, active in social welfare projects, wrote the first ever Jewish studies text-books in Croatian
- Immanuel Jakobovits (1921–1999), Chief Rabbi of the United Kingdom and Commonwealth, medical ethicist
- Leo Jung (1892–1987), one of the major architects of American Orthodox Judaism, "Grandfather of Modern Orthodoxy," teacher of ethics and homiletics at Yeshiva University
- Joseph Kaminetsky (1911–1999), American Modern Orthodox/Yeshivish rabbi, pioneering first director of Torah Umesorah – National Society for Hebrew Day Schools of North America, directly responsible for the establishment of hundreds of yeshiva day schools across the United States
- Norman Lamm (1927–2020), scholar, academic administrator, author and Jewish community leader; President, Rosh Yeshiva and Chancellor of Yeshiva University
- Aharon Lichtenstein (1933–2015), Rosh Yeshiva of Yeshivat Har Etzion, and Rosh Kollel of Yeshiva University's Gruss Kollel, son-in-law of Joseph B. Soloveitchik, father of Mosheh Lichtenstein
- Zvulun Lieberman (1930–2012), Rosh Yeshiva at RIETS, communal spiritual leader, head of the Syrian Community Bet Din and the Vaad Harabonim of Flatbush
- Joseph Lookstein (1902–1979), rabbi of Congregation Kehilath Jeshurun, President of the Rabbinical Council of America, of the Synagogue Council of America, of the New York Board of Rabbis of Bar-Ilan University and founder of the Ramaz School
- Mojsije Margel (1875–1939), rabbi of Zagreb, lexicographer, teacher and Hebrew scholar
- Moses Mescheloff (1909–2008), Modern Orthodox Religious Zionist rabbi, Miami Beach and Chicago
- Chalom Messas (1913–2003), Chief Rabbi of Morocco and Jerusalem
- David Messas (1934–2011), Chief Rabbi of Paris
- Solomon Mestel (1886–1966), British-Australian community rabbi, translator
- Jacob Itzhak Niemirower (1872–1939), first Chief Rabbi of Romanian Jewry, member of the Romanian Senate, supporter of Zionism, fighter against antisemitism, theologian, philosopher and historian
- Pinchas Hacohen Peli (1930–1989), Israeli Modern Orthodox rabbi, essayist, poet and scholar of Judaism and Jewish philosophy, Professor of Jewish Thought and Literature at the Ben-Gurion University of the Negev, a visiting professor at Yeshiva University, Cornell University, University of Notre Dame, the Seminario Rabbinico in Argentina and the Makuya Bible Seminary in Japan
- Baruch Poupko (1917–2010), American multi-lingual scholar, author and lecturer, National Vice President of the Rabbinical Council of America, National President of the Religious Zionists of America, son of Eliezer Poupko
- Emanuel Rackman (1910–2008), American Modern Orthodox rabbi, held pulpits in major congregations, helped draw attention to the plight of Refuseniks in the then-Soviet Union, attempted to resolve the dilemma of the Agunah, President of Bar-Ilan University
- Max D. Raiskin (1919–1978), rabbi, Professor of Hebrew Literature at Brooklyn College and Hunter College, licensed Certified Public Accountant, educator, author of educational textbooks, principal and executive director of the East Side Hebrew Institute
- Bernard Revel (1885–1940), Orthodox rabbi and scholar, founding President and Rosh Yeshiva of Yeshiva College and RIETS
- Kopul Rosen (1913–1962), Anglo-Jewish rabbi and educationalist, rabbi of Glasgow, Principal Rabbi of the Federation of Synagogues in London
- Michael Rosen (1945–2008), British-born Israeli rabbi and founder of Yakar, a Jewish learning community and synagogue, son of Kopul Rosen
- Moses Rosen (1912–1994), Chief Rabbi of Romanian Jewry, President of the Council of the Jewish Diaspora Museum in Tel Aviv
- Alexandru Șafran (1910–2006), Romanian-Swiss rabbi, theologian, philosopher, historian, Kabbalist, Chief Rabbi of Romania, intervened with authorities in the fascist government of Ion Antonescu in an unusually successful attempt to save Jews during the Holocaust
- Herschel Schacter (1917–2013), American Orthodox rabbi and Chairman of the Conference of Presidents of Major American Jewish Organizations, chaplain in the Third Army's VIII Corps, the first US Army Chaplain to enter and participate in the liberation of the Buchenwald concentration camp, rabbi of the Mosholu Jewish Center in the Bronx
- Melech Schachter (1913–2007), Rosh Yeshiva of Yeshiva University for over 50 years, father of Hershel Schachter
- Shlomo Shleifer (1889–1957), a government appointee, sustained the Choral Synagogue in Moscow during the worst years of Stalinist repression against Jews
- Simeon Singer (1846–1906), editor of the United Synagogue prayer book
- Ahron Soloveichik (1917–2001), Talmudist and rosh yeshiva of Rabbi Isaac Elchanan Theological Seminary
- Joseph Ber Soloveitchik (1903–1993), distinguished Rosh Yeshiva of the Rabbi Isaac Elchanan Theological Seminary and Maimonides School, author, posek, modern Jewish philosopher, a seminal figure in Modern Orthodox Judaism
- Isadore Twersky (1930–1997), Orthodox rabbi, Hasidic Rebbe, university professor at Harvard University, internationally recognized authority on rabbinic literature and Jewish philosophy
- Simon Ungar (1864–1942), Doctor of Oriental medicine, Chief Rabbi of the Osijek Jewish Community in Croatia who was murdered in the Holocaust
- Hinko Urbach (1872–1960), Chief Rabbi of Zagreb, Croatia, World War I veteran and Holocaust survivor
- Stanley M. Wagner (1932–2013), American rabbi, academic and community leader, Vice President of the Religious Zionists of America, led the Beth HaMedrosh Hagodol-Beth Joseph congregation, the only rabbi chaplain of the Colorado Senate, Professor of Jewish history at the University of Denver
- Louis Werfel (1916–1943), a recipient of Semichah from the Rabbi Isaac Elchanan Theological Seminary and a Harvard University alumnus, a Modern Orthodox and Religious Zionist rabbi, the only Orthodox Rabbi killed in action during World War II
- Ephraim Wolf (1921–2004), American Orthodox rabbi and spiritual leader, active in the founding and growth of many Jewish educational and communal institutions including the North Shore Hebrew Academy
- Walter Wurzburger (1920–2002), Adjunct Professor of Philosophy at Yeshiva University, headed both the Rabbinical Council of America and the Synagogue Council of America, author and communal rabbi in Toronto, Canada and Lawrence, New York

=== Contemporary (ca. 21st century) ===
==== Religious-Zionist ====
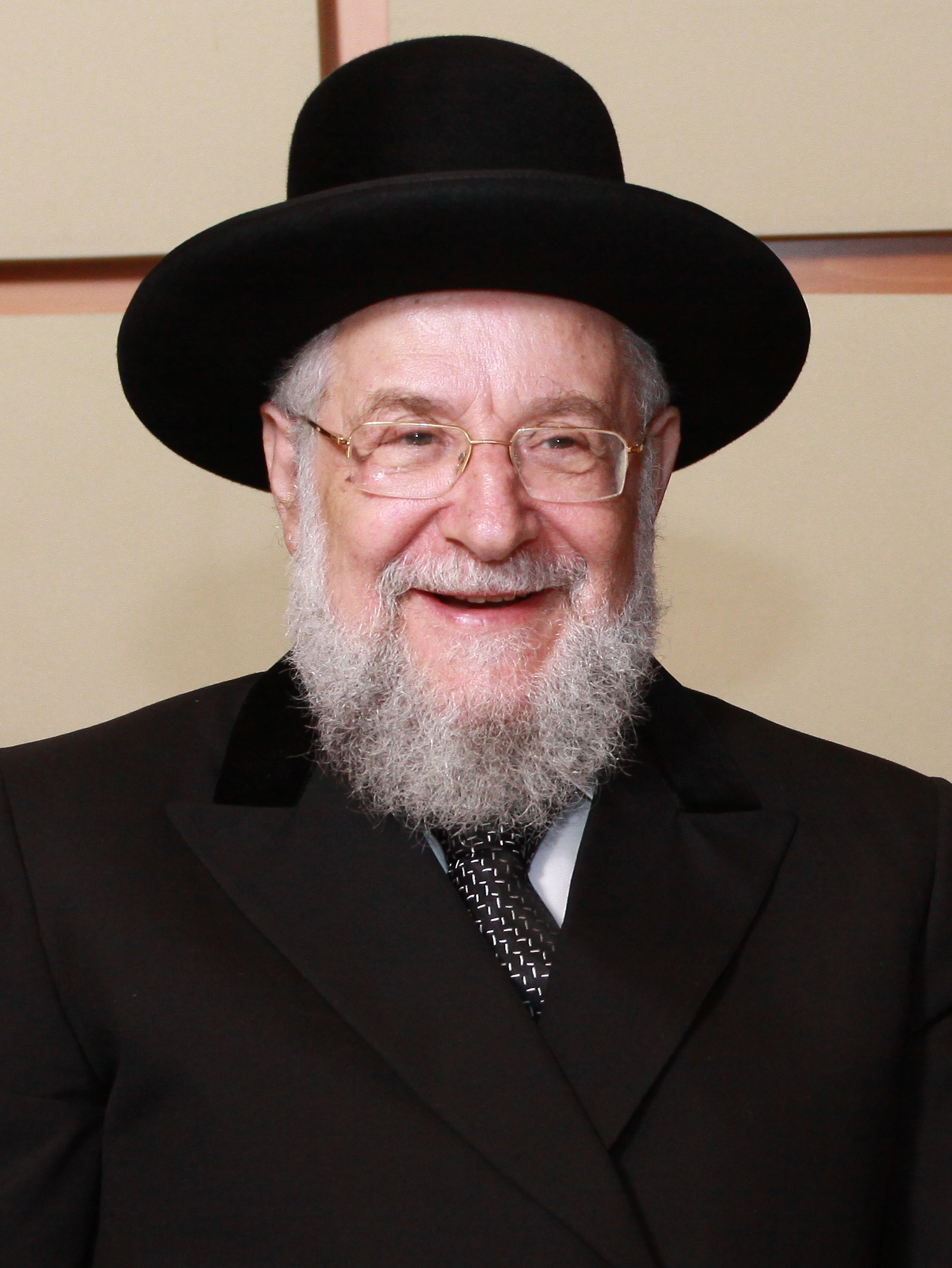
Yisrael Meir Lau

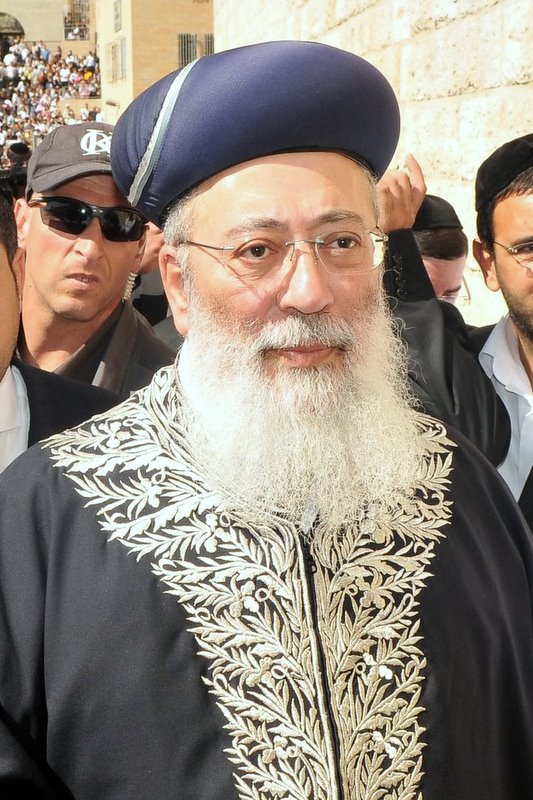
Shlomo Amar

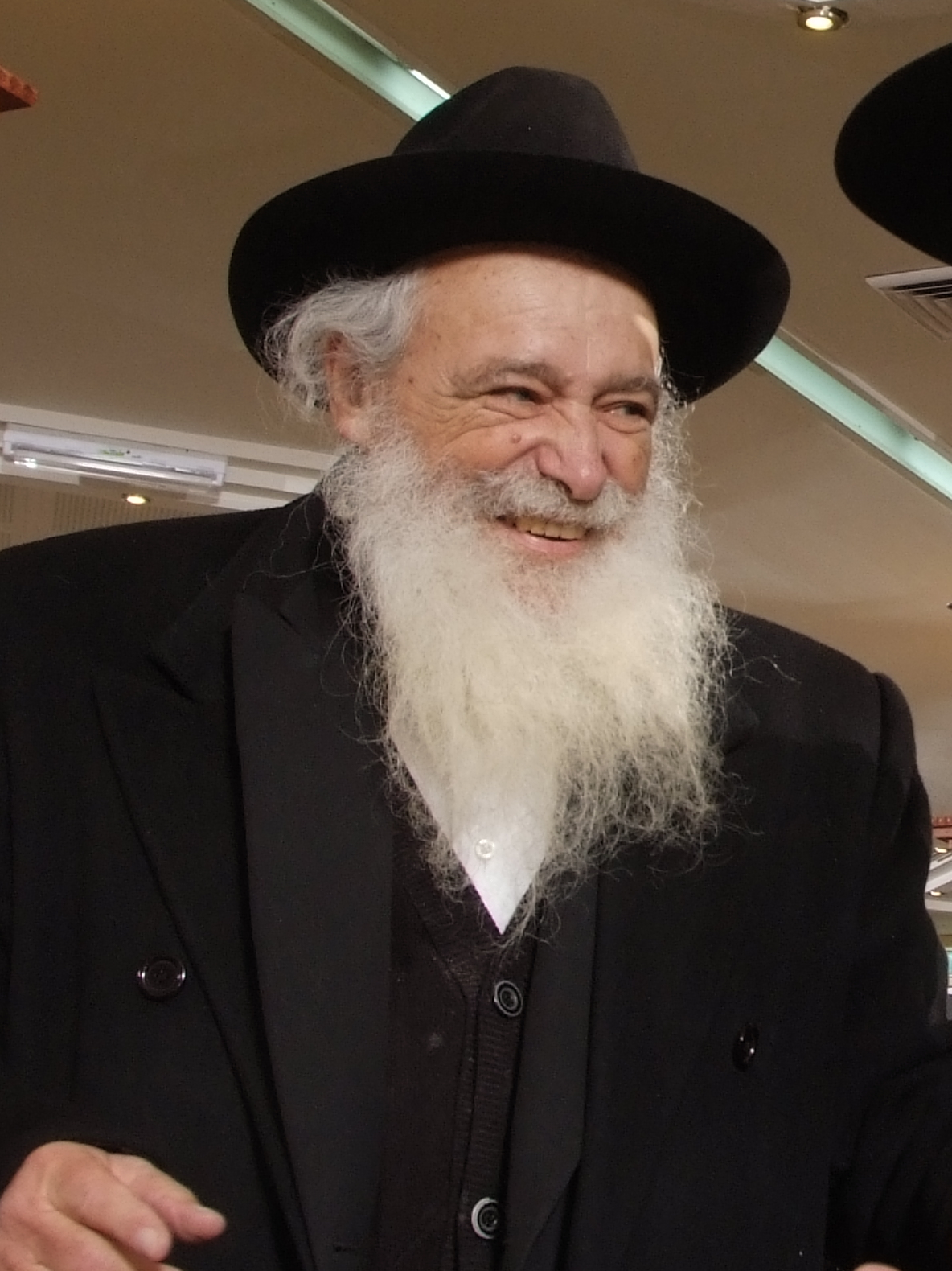
Avigdor Nebenzahl

- Shlomo Amar (1948–), Sephardic Chief Rabbi of Israel
- Haim Amsalem (1959-), former member of Knesset who focused on making conversion to Judaism easier
- Yaakov Ariel (1937–), Chief Rabbi of Ramat Gan, former rosh yeshiva of the yeshiva in the abandoned Israeli settlement of Yamit, rabbi of Kfar Maimon
- Yisrael Ariel (1939–), founder of the Temple Institute and one of the liberators of the Western Wall in the Six-Day War
- Shlomo Aviner (1943–), rosh yeshiva of the Ateret Yerushalayim Yeshiva in Jerusalem, rabbi of Bet El
- David Bar-Hayim (1960–), Av Beit Din, dayan, posek, founder of the Shilo Institute
- Yoel Bin-Nun (1946–), one of the founders of Yeshivat Har Etzion, Gush Emunim, Alon Shevut and Ofra, doctor of Jewish thought and a lecturer on Tanach
- Uri Amos Cherki (1959–), chairman of Brit Olam – Noahide World Center, a senior lecturer at Machon Meir, congregational leader, author and philosopher
- Yuval Cherlow (1957–), Rosh Yeshiva and co-founder of Orot Shaul and one of the founders of Tzohar
- Zephaniah Drori (1937–), Chief Rabbi of Kiryat Shmona, Israel and rosh yeshiva of the Kiryat Shmona Hesder Yeshiva, helped establish Yeshivat Kerem B'Yavneh
- Haim Drukman (1932–2022), Israeli politician, rosh yeshiva of Ohr Etzion Yeshiva, head of the Center for Bnei Akiva Yeshivot
- Shmuel Eliyahu (1956–), Chief Rabbi of Safed, member of the Chief Rabbinate Council
- Binyamin Elon (1954–2017), Israeli politician who served as a member of the Knesset for Moledet and the National Union
- Mordechai Elon (1959–), rosh yeshiva of Yeshivat HaKotel
- Baruch Gigi (1957-), rosh yeshiva of Yeshivat Har Etzion, communal rabbi of the Sephardi synagogue in Alon Shvut
- Yehuda Gilad (1955–), Rosh Yeshivat Maale Gilboa, rabbi of Kibbutz Lavi
- Yitzchak Ginsburgh (1944–), American-born Israeli, currently president of the Od Yosef Chai Yeshivah in the settlement of Yitzhar in the West Bank
- Yehudah Glick (1965–), American-born Israeli activist, politician, leader of HaLiba, a coalition of groups dedicated to reaching complete and comprehensive freedom and civil rights for Jews on the Temple Mount
- Re’em HaCohen (1957–), rosh yeshiva of Yeshivat Otniel and rabbi of the Otniel settlement
- Yeshayahu Hadari (1933–2018), Israeli religious scholar, first rosh yeshiva of Yeshivat HaKotel
- David Bar Hayim (1960–), founder of Machon Shilo, proponent of Nusach Eretz Yisrael
- Daniel Hershkowitz (1953–), Israeli politician, mathematician, professor, rabbi of the Ahuza neighborhood in Haifa, President of Bar-Ilan University
- Hillel Horowitz (1964–), Israeli politician
- Nachman Kahana (1937–), author and brother of Meir Kahane
- Binyamin Lau (1961–), head of 929: Tanach B'yachad, rabbi of Kehillat Ramban in Jerusalem
- Israel Meir Lau (1937–), former Ashkenazi Chief Rabbi of Israel and current Chief Rabbi of Tel Aviv
- Yitzhak Levy (1947–), Mashgiach at Yeshivat Har Etzion, politician, among the initiators of the establishment of the Jewish quarter in Jerusalem, co-founder of Elon Moreh
- Mosheh Lichtenstein (1961-), rosh yeshiva of Yeshivat Har Etzion, son of Aharon Lichtenstein and grandson of Joseph B. Soloveitchik
- Dov Lior (1933–), Chief Rabbi of Kiryat Arba and Hebron
- Yaakov Medan (1950-), rosh yeshiva of Yeshivat Har Etzion, partner in drafting the Gavison-Medan Covenant
- Eliezer Melamed (1961–), rosh yeshiva of Yeshivat Har Bracha, rabbi of the community Har Bracha, and author Peninei Halakha, son of Zalman Baruch Melamed
- Zalman Baruch Melamed (1937–), rabbi of Beit El, father of Eliezer Melamed
- Michael Melchior (1954–), activist and Israeli politician, community rabbi in Talpiyot, Jerusalem, Chief Rabbi of Norway
- Chaim Navon (1973 - )
- Yakov Nagen (1967–), Israeli author, rabbi at Yeshivat Otniel, leader in interfaith peace initiatives between Judaism and Islam
- Avigdor Nebenzahl (1935–), Chief Rabbi of the Old City of Jerusalem, senior rosh yeshiva at Yeshivat Netiv Aryeh, rabbi of the Ramban Synagogue
- Rafi Peretz (1956–), Israeli politician, former Chief Military Rabbi of the Israel Defense Forces
- Shai Piron (1965–), Israeli educator and politician
- Hanan Porat (1943–2011), Israeli educator, political activist and politician, one of the liberators of Jerusalem in the Six-Day War, co-founder of Yeshivat Har Etzion, Gush Emunim, Kfar Etzion, Alon Shevut, Elon Moreh and Ofra
- Meir Porush (1955-), Israeli politician who served as a member of the Knesset for Agudat Yisrael, son of Menachem Porush
- Nachum Eliezer Rabinovitch (1928–2020), Canadian-Israeli posek, rosh yeshiva of the London School of Jewish Studies and the Hesder Yeshiva Birkat Moshe in Ma'ale Adumim
- Yosef Zvi Rimon (1968–) Rabbi of the Gush Etzion Regional Council, Rosh Kollel at Yeshivat Har Etzion
- Haim Sabato (1952–), author, co-founder and rosh Yeshiva of Yeshivat Birkat Moshe (Ma’aleh Adumim)
- David Samson (1956–), Israeli Torah scholar, educational entrepreneur, author, congregational rabbi
- Sharon Shalom (1973–), Ethiopian-Israeli community rabbi, lecturer and writer
- Yaakov Shapira (1950–), rosh yeshiva of Mercaz HaRav, member of the Chief Rabbinate Council
- Yitzchak Sheilat (1946–), Israeli scholar of Jewish thought, co-founder of Yeshivat Birkat Moshe
- David Stav (1960–), educator, Chief Rabbi of the city of Shoham, chairman of the Tzohar organization, co-founder of Yeshivat Hesder Petah Tikva
- Adin Steinsaltz (1937–2020), Israeli Chabad Chasidic teacher, philosopher, Kabbalist, social critic, translator, author of Steinsaltz edition of the Talmud, recipient of the Israel Prize for Jewish Studies
- Aryeh Stern (1944–2026), Ashkenazi Chief Rabbi of Jerusalem and student of Zvi Yehuda Kook
- Zvi Thau (1938–), co-founder and president of Yeshivat Har Hamor in Jerusalem
- Ron Yosef (1974–), founder of the Israeli organization Hod, which represents Israeli gay and lesbian Orthodox Jews

==== Haredi ====
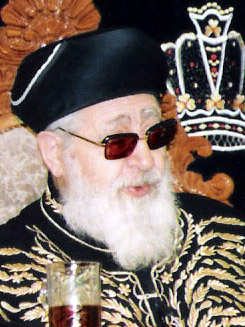
Ovadia Yosef

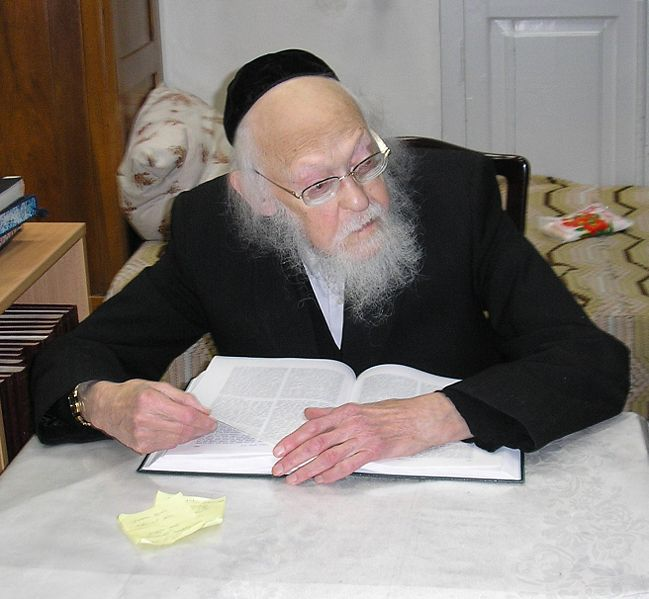
Yosef Shalom Elyashiv

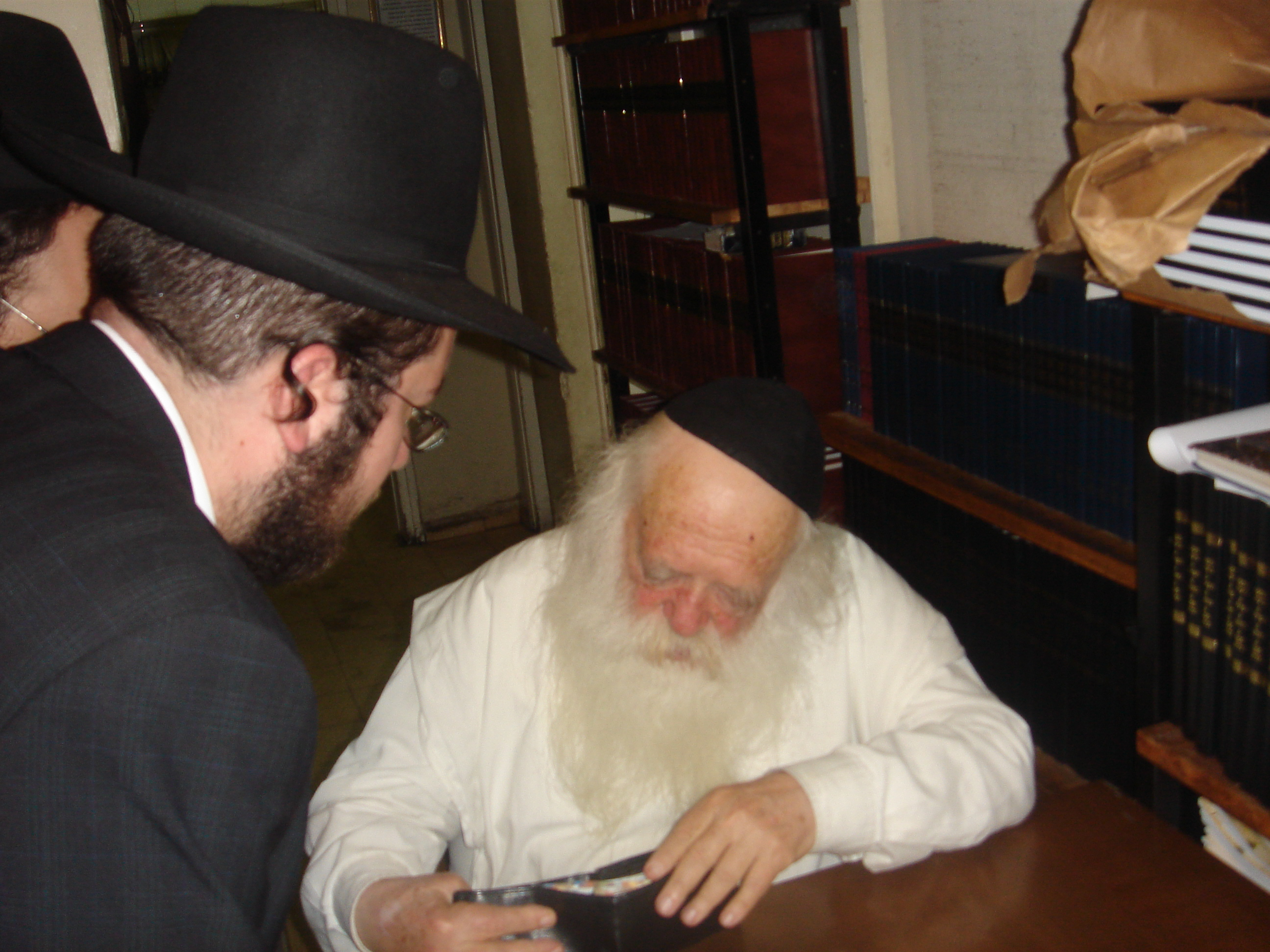
Chaim Kanievsky

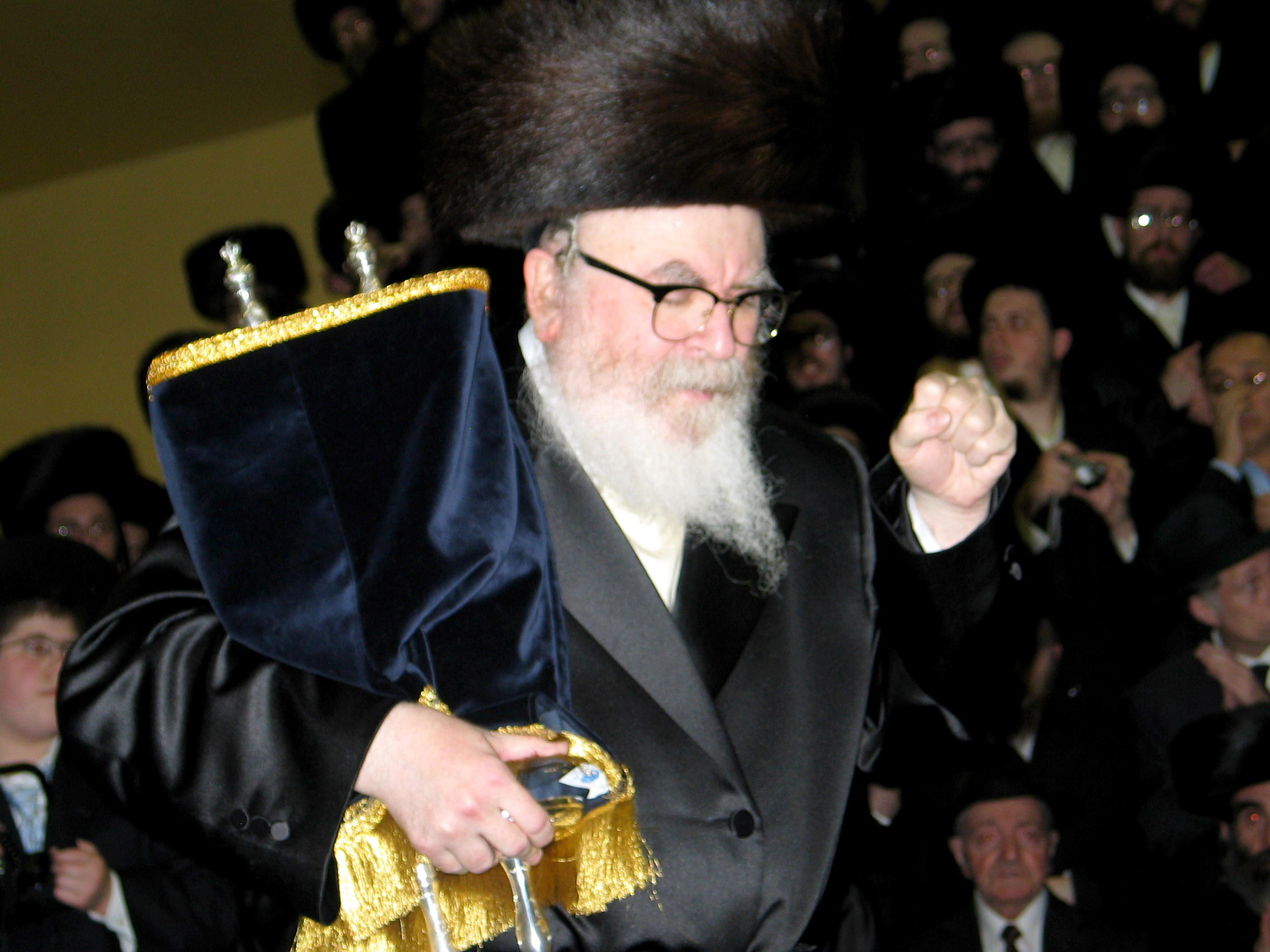
Dovid Twersky, Grand Rabbi of Skver

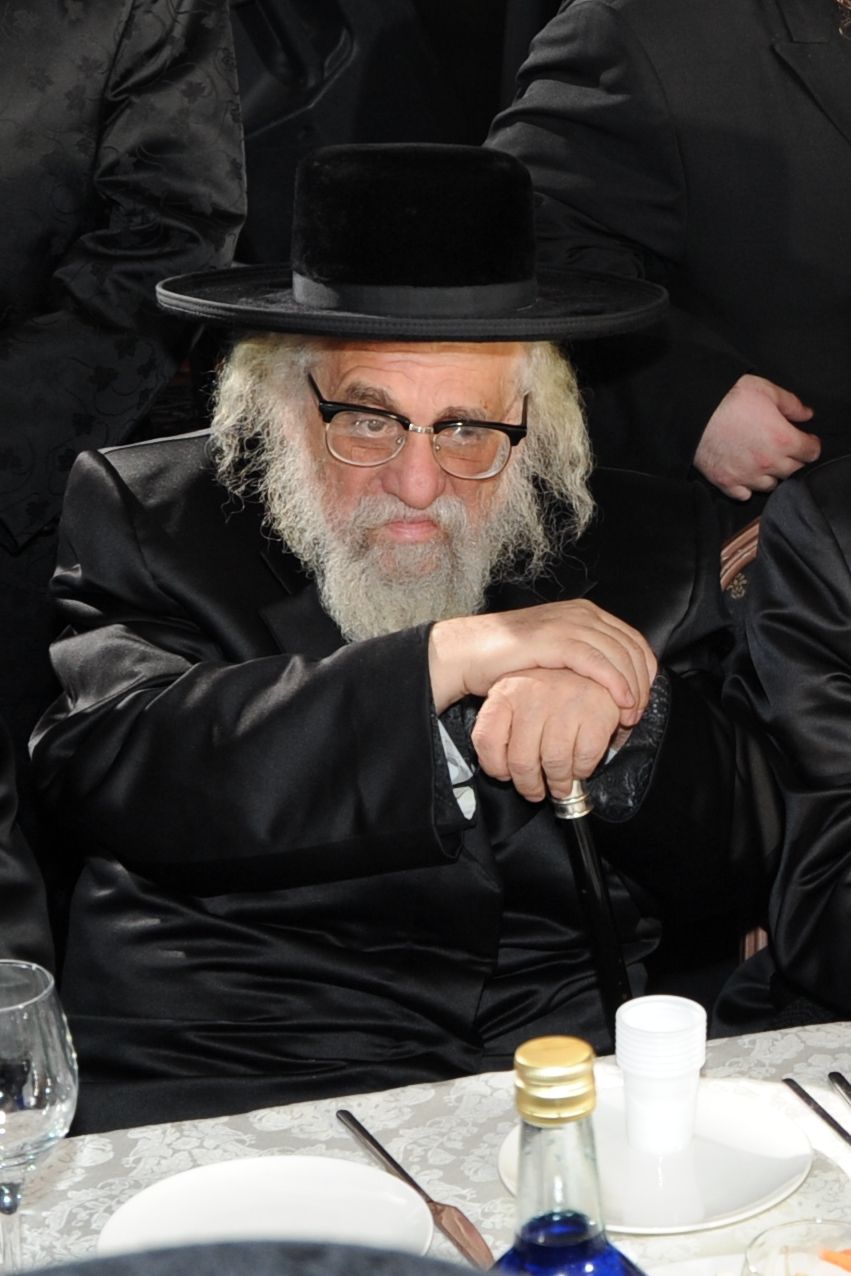
Yechezkel Roth of Karlsburg

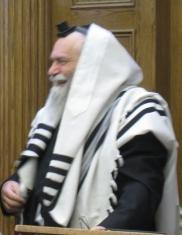
Shlomo Miller

- Elazar Abuhatzeira (1948–2011), Orthodox Sefardi rabbi and kabbalist, known to followers as the "Baba Elazar
- Asher Arieli (1957–), senior lecturer at Yeshivas Mir in Israel, son-in-law of Nachum Partzovitz
- Yaakov Aryeh Alter (1939–), eighth and current rebbe of the Hasidic dynasty of Ger
- Shalom Arush (1952–), Israeli Breslov rabbi and founder of the Chut Shel Chessed Institutions
- Mordechai Shmuel Ashkenazi (1943–2015), Orthodox rabbi and a member of the Chabad Hasidic movement
- Moshe Ber Beck (1934–2021), Orthodox rabbi and a chief rabbi of the Neturei Karta movement in the US.
- Yisroel Belsky (1938–2016), American Dean, Yeshiva Torah Vodaath, Senior Rabbi of the Orthodox Union
- Eliezer Berland (1937–), Israeli Orthodox Jewish rabbi and rosh yeshiva of Yeshivat Shuvu Bonim affiliated with the Breslov Hasidic movement.
- Yaakov Blau (1929–2013), rabbi and dayan on the Badatz of the Edah HaChareidis
- Avrohom Blumenkrantz (1944–2007), American posek and kashrut authority
- Shmuley Boteach (1966–), American Orthodox rabbi, radio and television host, and author
- Meir Brandsdorfer (1934–2009), member of the Badatz (rabbinical court) of the Edah HaChareidis
- Nachum Dov Brayer (1959–), present Rebbe of the Boyan
- Avraham Bromberg, American Rosh Yeshiva and posek
- Yosef Hamadani Cohen (1916–2014), Chief Rabbi of Iran and spiritual leader for the Jewish community of Iran
- Uriel Davidi (1922–2006), Chief Rabbi of Iran from 1980 to 1994
- Michel Dorfman (1913–2006), de facto head of the Breslover Hasidim living in post-Stalinist Russia
- Alfredo Goldschmidt (rabbi) (1945-) Great rabbi of Colombia and the Colegio Colombo Hebreo
- Yosef Tzvi Dushinsky, Rebbe of the Dushinsky of Jerusalem
- Shlomo Elyashiv (1841–1926), Lithuanian talmudist and Kabbalist known as the Leshem or Ba'al HaLeshem, teacher of Abraham Isaac Kook, grandfather of Yosef Sholom Eliashiv
- Yosef Sholom Eliashiv (1910–2012), Israeli rabbi and a rabbinical leader of the haredi world
- Aharon Feldman (1932–), American Rosh Yeshiva
- Gerrer Rebbes, Polish Hasidic dynasty now in Israel, followers also in the United States and UK
- Shlomo Goldman (1947–2017), Sanz-Klausenburger Grand Rabbi
- Shmuel Dovid Halberstam, Sanz-Klausenberger Rebbe of Borough Park
- Zvi Elimelech Halberstam (1952–), Sanz-Klausenburger Rebbe of Netanya, Israel
- Elchanan Heilprin (1921–2015), known as Av Beit Din of Radomishl
- Moshe Hirsch (1923 or 1924–2010), Leader of the anti-Zionist Neturei Karta group in Jerusalem
- Chaim Avrohom Horowitz (1933–2016), Grand Rabbi of the Boston Jewish Hasidic dynasty
- Mayer Alter Horowitz, Bostoner Rebbe of Jerusalem
- Naftali Yehuda Horowitz, Bostoner Rebbe
- Yitzchak Kadouri (1898–2006), leading 20th-century Kabbalist (Mekubal)
- Shmuel Kamenetsky (1924–), co-founder and rosh yeshiva (dean) of the Talmudical Yeshiva of Philadelphia
- Chaim Kanievsky (1928–2022), Israeli rabbi and posek, lived in Bnei Brak, Israel
- Nissim Karelitz (1926–2019), Israeli haredi leader
- Meir Kessler (1961–), rabbi of Modi'in Illit
- Yitzhak Aharon Korff, Rebbe of Zvhil – Mezhbizh, Boston and Jerusalem, and Rabbi, Jerusalem Great Synagogue.
- Zundel Kroizer (1924–2014), Israeli author of Ohr Hachamah
- Dov Landau, Israeli rosh yeshiva
- Berel Lazar (1964–), Italian Chief Rabbi of Russia
- Yosef Yechiel Mechel Lebovits Rebbe of Nikolsburg
- Yitzchok Lichtenstein (1962–), Rosh Yeshiva of Yeshiva Torah Vodaas, son of Aharon Lichtenstein, grandson of Joseph B. Soloveichik
- Ben Zion Aryeh Leibish Halberstam (1955–), current leader of the Bobov
- Meshulim Feish Lowy (1921–2015), Grand Rebbe of the Tosh hasidic dynasty
- Uri Mayerfeld, rosh yeshiva in Canada
- Moshe Meiselman (1942–), founder of Yeshiva University of Los Angeles (YULA), founder and Rosh Yeshiva of Yeshiva Toras Moshe, grandson of Moshe Soloveichik
- Yona Metzger (1953–), Israeli former Ashkenazi Chief Rabbi of Israel
- Avigdor Miller (1908–2001), American author and renowned lecturer
- Shlomo Miller, head of the Toronto Kollel and recognized authority of Jewish law
- Naftali Asher Yeshayahu Moscowitz, Rebbe of Ropshitz
- Yaakov Perlow, American Hasidic rebbe of Novominsk and rosh yeshiva living in Borough Park, Brooklyn
- Yoshiyahu Yosef Pinto (1973–), Israeli Orthodox rabbi who leads a global organization called Mosdot Shuva Israel. Based in Ashdod and New York
- Yisroel Avrohom Portugal, Rebbe of Skulen
- Dovid Povarsky (1902–1999), Rosh Yeshiva of the Ponevezh Yeshiva
- Moshe Leib Rabinovich (1940–), current rebbe of Munkacs
- Yehoshua Rokeach of Machnovka (1949–), Machnovka Rebbe of Bnei Brak
- Yissachar Dov Rokeach (1948–), Belzer Rebbe
- Elyakim Rosenblatt (1933-2019), American rosh yeshiva of Yeshiva Kesser Torah in Queens, NY
- Yechezkel Roth, Karlsburger Rav
- Shmuel Rozovsky (1913–1979), Rosh Yeshiva of the Ponevezh Yeshiva
- Chaim Pinchas Scheinberg (1910–2012), dean of Torah Ohr Yeshiva, Jerusalem
- Yitzchok Scheiner (1922–2021), Israeli rosh yeshiva
- Eliezer Shlomo Schick (1940–2015), Hasidic rabbi and prolific author and publisher of Breslov teachings
- Elyakim Schlesinger (1921–2026), English rabbi
- Elazar Menachem Shach (1899–2001), Rosh Yeshiva of the Ponevezh Yeshiva in Bnei Brak, founder of Degel HaTorah
- Moshe Shmuel Shapiro (1917–2006), Rosh Yeshiva and important [rabbinic figure in Israel
- Dovid Shmidel (1934–), Chairman of Asra Kadisha
- Aharon Yehuda Leib Shteinman (1912–2017), rabbi and posek (halakhic authority)
- Avrohom Yehoshua Soloveitchik (1946–), Rosh Yeshiva of Yeshivas Brisk, one of the Brisk yeshivas in Jerusalem, son of Berel Soloveitchik
- Meshulam Dovid Soloveitchik (1921–2021), Rosh Yeshiva of one of the branches of the Brisk yeshivas in Jerusalem, son of Yitzchok Zev Soloveitchik
- Aaron Teitelbaum (1947–), Grand Rebbes of Satmar, and the Ruv of the Satmar community in Kiryas Joel, New York
- Moshe Teitelbaum (1914–2006), Satmar Rebbe
- Zalman Teitelbaum (1951–), Grand Rebbe of Satmar, and the third son of Grand Rabbi Moshe Teitelbaum
- David Twersky (1940–), Grand Rabbi and spiritual leader of the village of New Square, New York
- Mordechai Dovid Unger (1954–), currently Bobover Rebbe
- Vizhnitzer Rebbes, (Vizhnitzer), Romanian dynasty of Hasidic rebbes in Israel and the United States
- Osher Weiss (1953-), Possek and An Av Beis Din
- Shmuel Wosner (1913–2015), Haredi rabbi and posek
- Dov Yaffe (1928–2017), Lithuanian-born Israeli rabbi
- Amnon Yitzhak (1953–), Yemenite "ba'al teshuva Rabbi" in Israel
- Ovadia Yosef (1920–2013), Iraqi-Israeli former Israel Sephardic Chief Rabbi, legal scholar, "de facto" leader of Sephardic Jewry
- Amram Zaks (1926–2012), rosh yeshiva of the Slabodka yeshiva of Bnei Brak
- Jonathan Markovitch (1967–), Chief Rabbi of Kyiv

==== Modern Orthodox ====
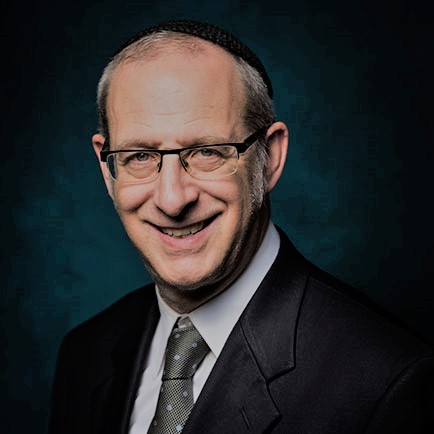
Michael Rosensweig

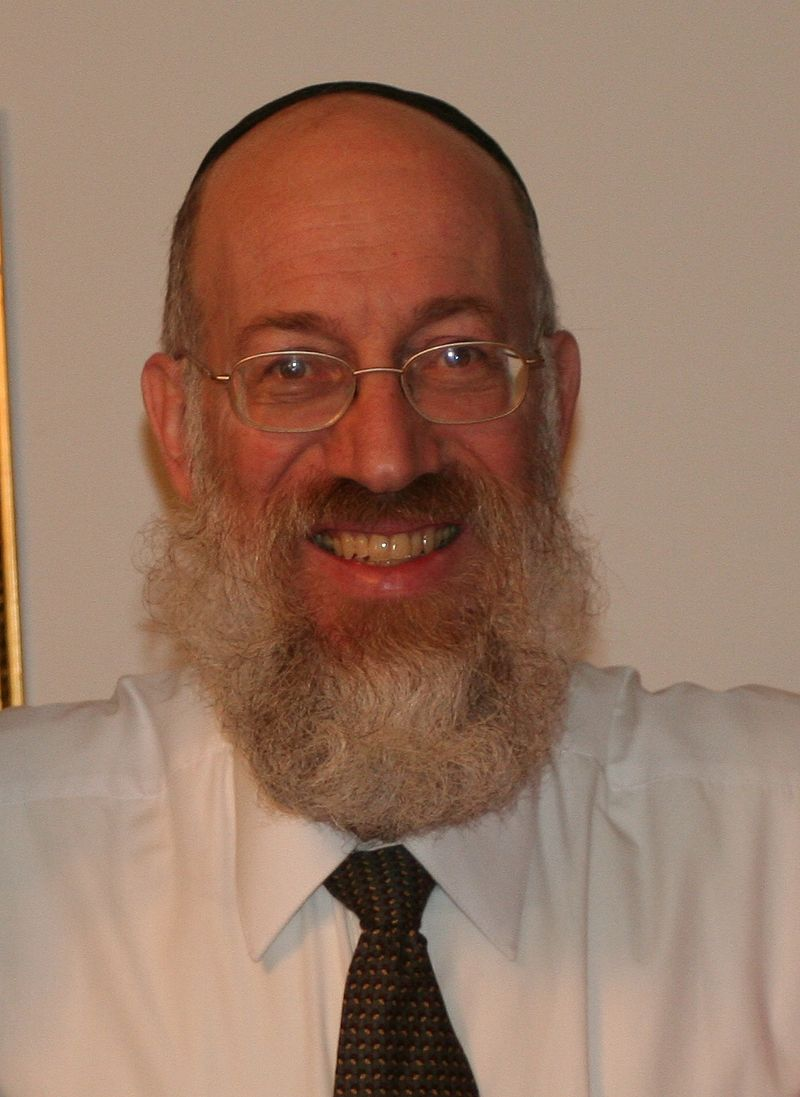
Mordechai Willig

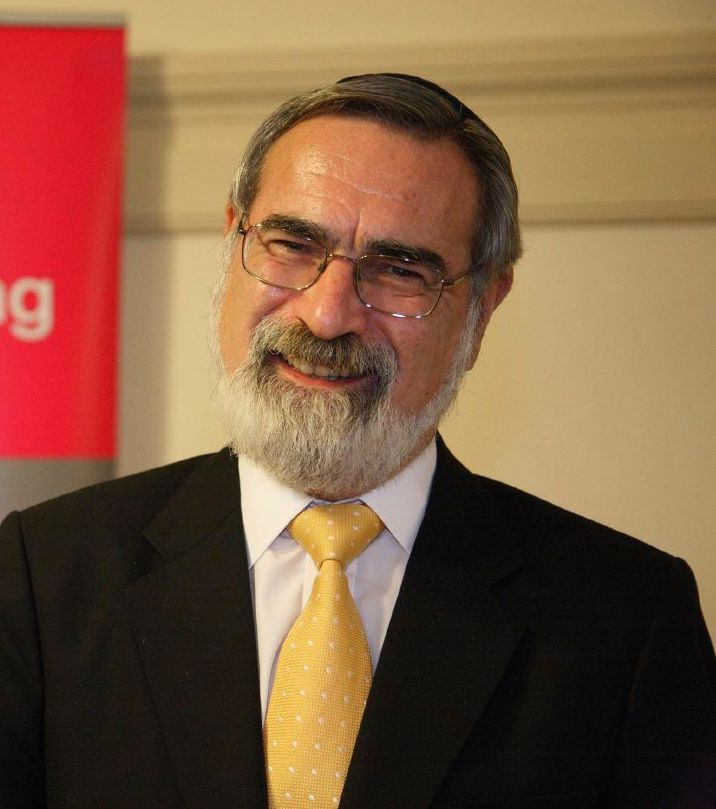
Jonathan Sacks

- Tzvi Hersh Weinreb (1940–), rabbi, psychotherapist, Executive Vice President Emeritus of the Orthodox Union, Editor-in-Chief of the Koren Talmud Bavli
- Marc D. Angel (1945–), Modern Orthodox rabbi and author, rabbi emeritus of Congregation Shearith Israel, the Spanish and Portuguese Synagogue in New York City
- Raymond Apple (1935–2024), Australian Jewish spokesman, writer and lecturer on Jewish, interfaith and freemasonic issues
- Assaf Bednarsh (1971–), Rosh Yeshiva of the Rabbi Isaac Elchanan Theological Seminary, Rosh Kollel for the Gruss Kollel in Jerusalem
- Harvey Belovski (1968–), British Orthodox rabbi, educator and organisational advisor, rabbi of Golders Green United Synagogue
- Eliyahu Ben Chaim (1940–), Chief Rabbi of Sha'are Shalom (United Mashadi Community of America) in Great Neck, Rosh Yeshiva at Yeshiva University, Av Beit Din of Badatz Mekor Haim, prominent leader of New York's Sephardi community
- Ari Berman (1970–), Fifth President of Yeshiva University
- Joshua Berman (1964–), Orthodox Rabbi and Professor of Bible at Bar-Ilan University
- Saul Berman (1939–), communal rabbi, Chairman of the Department of Judaic Studies of Stern College for Women of Yeshiva University, Director of Edah, Professor at Yeshiva University and Columbia University
- Ezra Bick (1946–), author, Ram at Yeshivat Har Etzion, scion of the Rapoport-Bick rabbinic dynasty
- David Bigman (1954–), Rosh Yeshiva of Yeshivat Ma'ale Gilboa, helped found the Ein Hanatziv Midrasha for girls, previous Rosh Yeshiva of the Ein Tzurim Yeshiva
- Yosef Blau – Mashgiach ruchani at RIETS for over 40 years, president of the Religious Zionists of America
- Benjamin Blech (1933-), American modern Orthodox thinker, Professor of Talmud and Jewish Thought at Yeshiva University, author and speaker
- J. David Bleich (1936–), Posek and ethicist, including Jewish medical ethics, Rosh yeshiva and professor at RIETS and Yeshiva University
- Kenneth Brander (1962–), American rabbi, president and Rosh Yeshiva of the Ohr Torah Stone network of institutions
- Reuven Pinchas Bulka (1944–2021), Canadian rabbi, writer, broadcaster and activist, spiritual leader of Congregation Machzikei Hadas in Ottawa, co-president of the Canadian Jewish Congress
- Shalom Carmy (1949–), American Modern Orthodox rabbi, Professor at Yeshiva University, writer and editor
- Kotel Dadon (1967–), Israeli Orthodox rabbi, Chief Rabbi of Croatia,
- Ahron Daum (1951–2018), Israeli-born Modern-Orthodox rabbi, educator, author and Chief Rabbi of Frankfurt am Main
- Chuck Davidson (1961-), founder of organizations Giyur Kehalacha and Ahavat Hager which aims to undermine the Chief Rabbinate of Israel and their monopoly with conversions and marriages
- Mark Dratch (1958–), Instructor of Jewish Studies at Yeshiva University and founder of JSafe
- Seth Farber (1967–), American-Israeli Modern Orthodox rabbi, historian, author, and founder and director of the Jewish life advocacy organization, ITIM
- Barry Freundel (1951-), former rabbi of Kesher Israel Congregation in Washington, D.C., convicted of voyeurism
- Manis Friedman (1946-), a biblical scholar, author, counselor and speaker
- Aryeh Frimer (1946–), American-Israeli Active Oxygen Chemist, teacher at Bar Ilan University, specialist on Women and Jewish law
- Menachem Genack (1949-), CEO of the Orthodox Union Kosher Division, Rosh Yeshiva at Yeshiva University, founding chairman of NORPAC
- Meir Goldwicht — Rosh Yeshiva at Yeshiva University
- Moshe Gottesman (1932-2018), rabbi, educator and community leader
- Irving Greenberg (1933–), American rabbi and writer on the relationship between Christianity and Judaism
- Steven Greenberg (1956–), first openly homosexual Orthodox rabbi
- David Bar Hayim (1960-), founder of Machon Shilo, proponent of Nusach Eretz Yisrael
- Nathaniel Helfgot (1963–), President of the International Rabbinic Fellowship
- Yehuda Henkin (1945-2020), author of the responsa Benei Vanim, modern orthodox posek
- Shmuel Herzfeld (1974–), Senior rabbi of Ohev Sholom - The National Synagogue in Washington, D.C., Vice President of the AMCHA Initiative, teacher, lecturer, activist, author
- David Hirsch (1968–), Rosh Yeshiva at Yeshiva University for over 20 years
- Howard Jachter – American Orthodox rabbi, Dayan, educator, author and communal leader, expert on the laws of Jewish divorce
- Ephraim Kanarfogel (1955–), rabbi and Torah scholar, professor and dean at Yeshiva University, one of the foremost experts in the fields of medieval Jewish history and rabbinic literature
- Moshe Kletenik (1954–), congregational rabbi, Av Beit Din and Mesader Gittin, President of the Rabbinical Council of America
- Eugene Korn (1947–), Academic Director of the Center for Jewish-Christian Understanding and Cooperation (CJCUC) in Jerusalem, Director of Interfaith Affairs for the Anti-Defamation League, writer
- Joel Landau, New York rabbi associated with Yad Ezra V’Shulamit
- Baruch Lanner (1949–), American former Orthodox rabbi who was convicted of child sexual abuse
- Haskel Lookstein (1932–), American Modern Orthodox rabbi, rabbi emeritus of Congregation Kehilath Jeshurun on the Upper East Side of Manhattan, principal of the Ramaz School, son of Joseph Lookstein
- Ephraim Mirvis (1956–), Chief Rabbi of the UK and Commonwealth
- Leonard Matanky (1958–), Modern Orthodox rabbi, co-president of the Religious Zionists of America, pulpit rabbi, Dean of Ida Crown Jewish Academy, past president of the Rabbinical Council of America
- Yaakov Neuburger (1955–), Rosh Yeshiva at Yeshiva University
- Sacha Pecaric (1965–), Yugoslavian/Croatian-Italian-American rabbi, author of the first translation of the Torah from Hebrew to Polish to be done by a Jew since the Second World War
- Menachem Penner (1971–), Dean of the Rabbi Isaac Elchanan Theological Seminary, Rabbi Emeritus of the Young Israel of Holliswood
- Dale Polakoff (1957–), American rabbi, teacher and spiritual leader, Senior rabbi of the Great Neck Synagogue for over 30 years, past President of the Rabbinical Council of America
- Yona Reiss (1966–), American rabbi, noted Torah scholar, attorney, lecturer and jurist, current Av Beth Din of the Chicago Rabbinical Council
- Hershel Reichman (1944–), Rosh Yeshiva at Yeshiva University
- Shlomo Riskin (1940-), founding Chief Rabbi of Efrat, founding rabbi of Lincoln Square Synagogue on the Upper West Side of New York City, dean of Manhattan Day School, founder and Chancellor of the Ohr Torah Stone Institutions
- David Rosen (1951–), South African-British-Israeli rabbi, Chief Rabbi of Ireland, American Jewish Committee's International Director of Interreligious Affairs, son of Kopul Rosen
- Jeremy Rosen (1942–), Orthodox Rabbi, author and lecturer, son of Kopul Rosen
- Jonathan Rosenblatt (1956–), American Modern Orthodox rabbi, teacher, lecturer, and counselor
- Itamar Rosensweig (1989–), Maggid Shiur at Yeshiva University, dayan (rabbinic judge) at the Beth Din of America, resident scholar at Congregation Ahavath Torah, son of rabbi Michael Rosensweig
- Michael Rosensweig (1956–), Rosh Yeshiva at the Rabbi Isaac Elchanan Theological Seminary of Yeshiva University and the Rosh Kollel of the Beren Kollel Elyon
- Jonathan Sacks (1948–2020), Chief Rabbi of the United Kingdom and Commonwealth, philosopher, theologian, author, peer and public figure, great-grandson of Aryeh Leib Frumkin
- Yonason Sacks – Rosh Yeshiva of Lander College for Men, spiritual leader of the Agudas Yisroel Bircas Yaakov
- Yehuda Sarna (1977–), Chief Rabbi of the Jewish Community of the United Arab Emirates
- Hershel Schachter (1941–), Rosh Yeshiva of Yeshiva University, posek, son of Melech Schachter
- Jacob J. Schacter (1950–), American Orthodox rabbi, historian, University Professor of Jewish History and Jewish Thought and Senior Scholar at the Center for the Jewish Future at Yeshiva University, son of Herschel Schacter
- Hanan Schlesinger – American-Israeli Orthodox rabbi, co-founder of Roots, a joint Palestinian-Israeli grassroots peacemaking initiative
- Arthur Schneier (1930-), prominent rabbi in the secular world and rabbi at Park East Synagogue, which hosted Pope Benedict
- Elliot Schrier (1989–), community leader and teacher, current Mara d'asra of Congregation Bnai Yeshurun in Teaneck, New Jersey
- Gedalia Dov Schwartz (1925–2020), Orthodox rabbi, scholar and posek, the av beis din of both the Beth Din of America and the Chicago Rabbinical Council (cRc), rosh beth din of the National Beth Din of the Rabbinical Council of America, President of the Mizrachi of Rhode Island and the RCA Philadelphia Region
- Adolf Shayevich (1937–), rabbi of the Moscow Choral Synagogue, Chief Rabbi of Russia
- Eli Baruch Shulman (1959–), Rosh Yeshiva at Yeshiva University, Rabbi Henry H. Guterman chair in Talmud, author and editor
- Zvi Sobolofsky – Rosh Yeshiva at Yeshiva University and rabbi of Ohr Hatorah in Bergenfield, New Jersey
- Haym Soloveitchik (1937–), Rosh Yeshiva at RIETS, professor at Hebrew University and Yeshiva University, leading contemporary historian of Jewish law
- Meir Soloveichik (1977–), American Orthodox rabbi and writer, rabbi of Congregation Shearith Israel in New York City, grandson of Ahron Soloveichik
- Shubert Spero (1923–), Irving Stone Professor of Jewish Thought at Bar Ilan University, Rabbi Emeritus of Young Israel of Cleveland, Ohio, author on the subjects of halakha, ethics, the Holocaust, Jewish philosophy and the thought of Joseph B. Soloveitchik
- Ben-Tzion Spitz (1969–), Chief Rabbi of Uruguay, writer and Nuclear Engineer
- Daniel Stein, (1976–), Rosh Yeshiva at Yeshiva University, rabbi of Congregation Ahavath Chesed on the Upper West Side of Manhattan, founding rabbi of Kehillas Beis Sholom in Clifton, New Jersey
- Moshe David Tendler (1926-2021), Rosh Yeshiva at RIETS, professor of biology at Yeshiva University, expert in medical ethics, son-in-law of Moshe Feinstein
- Kalman Topp (1972–), American rabbi, educator, author, Senior Rabbi of the Beth Jacob Congregation of Beverly Hills, California
- Mayer Twersky (1960–), Rosh Yeshiva at Yeshiva University, Grand Rabbi of the Talne Chasidim, grandson of rabbi Joseph B. Soloveitchik
- Berel Wein (1934–2025), American-born Orthodox rabbi, lecturer and writer, Rosh Yeshiva of Yeshiva Shaarei Torah of Rockland, senior faculty member of Yeshiva Ohr Somayach
- Moshe Weinberger (1957–), founding spiritual leader of Congregation Aish Kodesh, Mashpia/mashgiach ruchani at RIETS, the "senior spokesman" of the Neo-Hasidic movement in Modern Orthodoxy
- Jeremy Wieder (1971–), Rosh Yeshiva at Yeshiva University, one of the first Americans to win the International Bible Contest (Chidon Hatanach)
- Mordechai Willig (1947-), Rosh Yeshiva at Yeshiva University, prominent posek for the Modern Orthodox community.
- Pesach Wolicki (1970–), educator, writer, columnist, lecturer, public speaker and pro-Israel activist, Rosh Yeshiva at Yeshivat Yesodei HaTorah, Associate Director of the Center for Jewish-Christian Understanding and Cooperation (CJCUC)
- Benjamin Yudin (1944-), rabbi of Shomrei Torah in Fair Lawn, New Jersey

== Conservative ==
Open Orthodox

- Dov Linzer (1966–), President and Rosh Yeshiva of the Open-Orthodox Yeshivat Chovevei Torah Rabbinical School in Riverdale, New York
- Avi Weiss (1944–), Founder, Yeshivat Chovevei Torah, and rabbi of the Hebrew Institute of Riverdale

=== 19th century ===
- Zecharias Frankel (1801–1875), critical historian, founder of the "Positive Historical" school, progenitor of Conservative Judaism
- Levi Herzfeld (1810–1884), German rabbi, proponent of moderate reform
- Nachman Krochmal (1785–1840), Austrian philosopher and historian

=== 20th century ===
- Jacob B. Agus, rabbi and theologian
- Philip R. Alstat, Conservative rabbi
- Ben-Zion Bokser, Conservative rabbi
- Boaz Cohen, Talmud scholar and Jewish Theological Seminary of America professor
- Gerson D. Cohen, historian and Jewish Theological Seminary of America chancellor
- Moshe Davis, historian at the Jewish Theological Seminary of America and Hebrew University
- Louis Finkelstein, Talmud scholar and Jewish Theological Seminary of America professor
- Louis Ginzberg (1873–1953), American Conservative Talmud scholar
- Robert Gordis, leader in Conservative Judaism
- Sidney Greenberg, rabbi and author
- Simon Greenberg, professor and vice-chancellor at the Jewish Theological Seminary of America
- Morris Gutstein, congregational rabbi and historian
- Jules Harlow, liturgist
- Arthur Hertzberg, rabbi, scholar, and activist
- Abraham Joshua Heschel (1907–1972), philosopher, scholar of Hasidism, and Jewish Theological Seminary of America professor
- Max Kadushin, philosopher and Jewish Theological Seminary of America professor
- Wolfe Kelman, Rabbinical Assembly leader
- Isaac Klein, American rabbi and scholar of halakhah
- Albert L. Lewis, Conservative rabbi
- Saul Lieberman, rabbi and scholar
- Marshall Meyer, rabbi and human rights activist, founded a rabbinical school and synagogue in Argentina
- Chaim Potok, American rabbi and author
- Samuel Schafler, American rabbi and historian
- Solomon Schechter, scholar and a founder of Conservative Judaism
- Morris Silverman, American rabbi and liturgist
- Chana Timoner, first female rabbi to hold an active duty assignment as a chaplain in the U.S. Army

=== Contemporary (ca. 21st century) ===
- Leslie Alexander (rabbi), first female rabbi of a major Conservative Jewish synagogue in the United States
- Lia Bass, second Latin American female rabbi in the world.
- Sharon Brous, Founder of Ikar and prominent voice for justice
- Geoffrey Claussen, Conservative rabbi and Elon University professor
- Aryeh Cohen, Conservative rabbi and American Jewish University professor
- Martin Samuel Cohen, Conservative rabbi and author
- Shaye J. D. Cohen, Conservative rabbi and Harvard University professor
- Moshe Cotel, pianist, composer, and rabbi
- Menachem Creditor, Conservative rabbi, activist, and founder of the Shefa Network
- Cynthia Culpeper, first full-time female rabbi in Alabama
- Jerome Cutler, director of the Creative Arts Temple in West Los Angeles, California.
- David G. Dalin, rabbi and historian
- Zvi Dershowitz (1928–2023), rabbi of Sinai Temple, Los Angeles, California
- Elliot N. Dorff, Conservative rabbi, bioethicist, and professor of Jewish Theology at the American Jewish University
- Amy Eilberg, Conservative rabbi, author and co-founded the Bay Area Jewish Healing Center in San Francisco
- Edward Feld, Conservative rabbi and siddur editor
- Everett Gendler, rabbi and progressive activist
- Neil Gillman, philosopher, theologian, and Jewish Theological Seminary of America professor
- David Golinkin, Masorti rabbi and halakhist
- Michael Greenbaum, professor and vice-chancellor at the Jewish Theological Seminary of America
- Reuven Hammer, Masorti rabbi, author, and siddur commentator
- Sherre Hirsch, rabbi and author
- Judith Hauptman, feminist Talmudic scholar at the Jewish Theological Seminary of America
- Rachel Isaacs, first openly lesbian rabbi ordained by the Jewish Theological Seminary of America
- Jill Jacobs (rabbi), Executive Director of T'ruah: The Rabbinic Call for Human Rights
- Louis Jacobs, founder of the Masorti movement in the United Kingdom, theologian
- William E. Kaufman, advocate of process theology
- Daniella Kolodny, first female rabbi enlisted in the United States Naval Academy
- Myer S. Kripke, rabbi, scholar, and philanthropist based in Omaha, Nebraska
- Joshua Kulp, Conservative scholar and rabbi and founder of the Conservative Yeshiva in Jerusalem
- Harold Kushner, American Conservative rabbi, theologian, and popular writer
- Aaron Landes (1929–2014), rabbi of Beth Sholom in Elkins Park, Pennsylvania
- Amichai Lau-Lavie – Israeli-American Conservative rabbi, social entrepreneur, human rights activist, founder of Storahtelling
- William H. Lebeau, Conservative rabbi and Dean of Rabbinical School at Jewish Theological Seminary of America
- Naomi Levy, American rabbi, author and speaker
- Alan Lew, teacher of Jewish meditation
- Aaron L. Mackler, Conservative rabbi and bioethicist
- Alan Mittleman, professor of Jewish philosophy at the Jewish Theological Seminary of America
- Jack Moline, Executive Director of Interfaith Alliance
- Jacob Neusner (1932–2016), Conservative trained scholar and writer
- Daniel Nevins, Dean of JTS Rabbinical School and author of inclusive teshuvah on homosexuality in Judaism
- Einat Ramon, first Israeli-born woman rabbi
- Paula Reimers, one of the first women to be ordained by the Jewish Theological Seminary of America
- Arnold Resnicoff, Navy Chaplain, AJC National Director of Interreligious Affairs, Special Assistant (Values and Vision) to the Secretary and Chief of Staff of the United States Air Force
- Joel Roth, Conservative scholar and rabbi
- Simchah Roth. Israeli rabbi and Siddur Va'ani Tefillati editor
- Danya Ruttenberg, Award-winning author, editor and social justice activist
- Julie Schonfeld, first female rabbi to serve in the chief executive position of an American rabbinical association
- Ismar Schorsch, Conservative educator and leader
- Harold M. Schulweis, rabbi of Valley Beth Shalom, Encino, California and founder of the Jewish World Watch
- Rona Shapiro, first female rabbi to head a Conservative synagogue in Cleveland
- Alan Silverstein, rabbi of Congregation Agudath Israel in Caldwell, New Jersey, and former President of the Rabbinical Assembly
- Mychal Springer, rabbi and Jewish Theological Seminary of America leader
- Valerie Stessin, first woman to be ordained as a Conservative rabbi in Israel
- Ira F. Stone, a leading figure in the contemporary renewal of the Musar movement
- Susan Tendler, first female rabbi in Chattanooga
- Gordon Tucker, Conservative rabbi
- Stuart Weinblatt, Conservative rabbi and founder of Congregation B'nai Tzedek in Potomac, Maryland; President of the Rabbinic Cabinet of the Jewish Federations of North America
- Bea Wyler, first female rabbi in Germany to officiate at a congregation

== Union for Traditional Judaism ==
- David Weiss Halivni (1927–2022)

== Reform ==
=== 19th century ===
- Samuel Adler (1809–1891), German-American rabbi of Temple Emanu-El
- Moses Berlin (1852–1927), British Reform rabbi
- Emil Hirsch (1851–1923), American Reform rabbi and scholar
- David Einhorn (1809–1879), American Reform rabbi
- Samuel Hirsch (1815–1889), German-American philosopher of the Reform Movement
- Abraham Geiger (1810–1874), German Reform ideologist
- Samuel Holdheim (1806–1860), German rabbi and founder of classic German Reform Judaism
- Solomon Marcus Schiller-Szinessy (1820–1890), Hungarian-English Reform rabbi in Eperies and Manchester, first Jewish professor in Cambridge
- Leopold Zunz (1794–1886), German scholar, founded Science of Judaism school
- Isaac Mayer Wise (1819–1900), American Reform rabbi

=== 20th century ===
- Paula Ackerman (1893–1989), first female to perform rabbinical functions in the United States, not ordained
- Joseph Asher (1921–1990), advocate of reconciliation between the Jews and the Germans in the post-Holocaust era
- Leo Baeck (1873–1956), Reform rabbi
- Laszlo Berkowitz (1928–2020), Reform rabbi, Temple Rodef Shalom
- Lionel Blue (1930–2016), British rabbi, writer and broadcaster
- Abraham Cronbach (1882–1965), Reform rabbi & educator
- Maurice Davis (1921–1993), Reform rabbi, past Chairman, President's Commission on Equal Opportunity
- David Max Eichhorn (1906–1986), Reform Jewish rabbi, author, founder of Merritt Island's Temple Israel, and Army chaplain among the troops that liberated Dachau
- Regina Jonas (1902–1944), first female rabbi in the world
- Gunther Plaut (1912–2012), Reform rabbi and author, Holy Blossom Temple
- Murray Saltzman (1929–2010), Reform rabbi
- Abba Hillel Silver (1893–1963), Reform rabbi and Zionist leader
- Stephen S. Wise (1874–1949), Reform rabbi and Zionist activist

=== Contemporary (ca. 21st century) ===
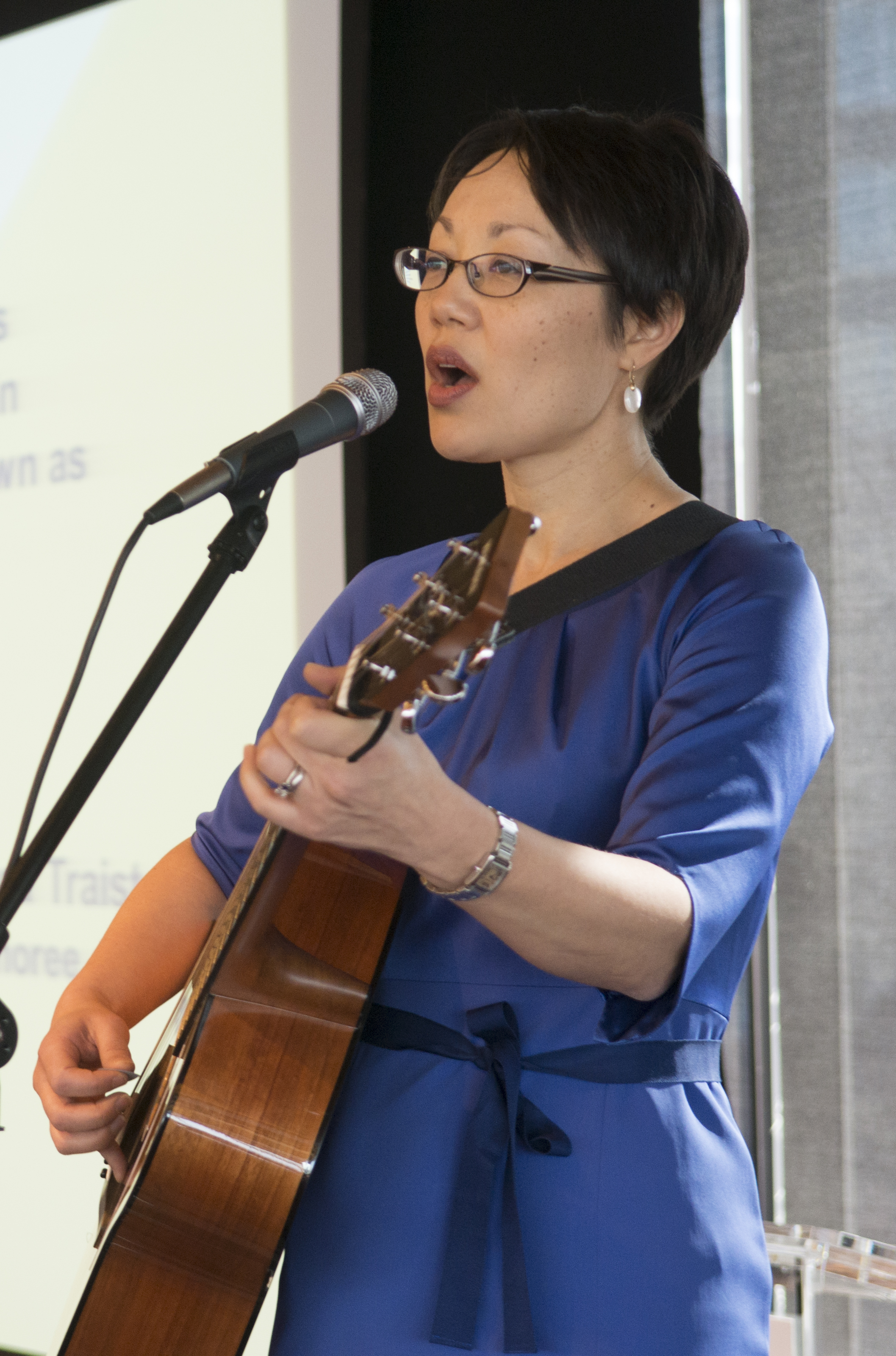
Rabbi Angela Warnick Buchdahl

- Pauline Bebe, first female rabbi in France
- Jackie Tabick, first female rabbi in Britain
- Sally Priesand, Reform rabbi, first female rabbi in the United States
- Julia Neuberger, British Reform rabbi
- Elyse Goldstein, first female Rabbi in Canada, educator and writer
- Rachel Adler, theologian and Hebrew Union College professor
- Arik Ascherman, American-born Reform rabbi and human rights activist for both Jews and non-Jews in Israel-best known for advocating for Palestinian human rights.
- Angela Warnick Buchdahl, American rabbi
- Rebecca Dubowe, first deaf woman to be ordained as a rabbi in the United States
- Denise Eger, former rabbi of Beth Chayim Chadashim (world's first LGBT synagogue) and founder of Temple Kol Ami in West Hollywood, first female and open lesbian to serve as president of Southern California Board of Rabbis, officiated at the first legal same-sex wedding of two women in California
- David Ellenson, former president of the Hebrew Union College – Jewish Institute of Religion, and chancellor emeritus
- Lisa Goldstein, Executive Director of the Institute for Jewish Spirituality
- Dana Evan Kaplan, rabbi at Temple Beth Shalom in Sun City, Arizona; author of The New Reform Judaism: Challenges and Reflections, the most current modern scholarly analysis of contemporary Reform Judaism
- Alysa Stanton, first ordained Black female rabbi (Reform) in America
- Margaret Wenig, rabbi known for advocating for LGBT rights

== Reconstructionists ==
=== 20th century ===
- Mordecai Kaplan (1881–1983), founder of the Reconstructionist movement in America
- Ira Eisenstein (1906–2001), founding president of the Reconstructionist Rabbinical College

=== Contemporary (ca. 21st century) ===
- Deborah Brin, one of the first openly gay rabbis and one of the first hundred women rabbis
- Susan Schnur, editor of Lilith Magazine
- Rebecca Alpert, rabbi, historian and professor
- Dan Ehrenkrantz, president of Reconstructionist Rabbinical College
- Sandy Eisenberg Sasso, children's book author
- Tina Grimberg, leader in the inter-religious dialog
- Carol Harris-Shapiro, modern author
- Sandra Lawson, first openly gay, female, black rabbi
- Joy Levitt, first female president of the Reconstructionist Rabbinical Association.
- Toba Spitzer, first openly gay head of a rabbinical association

== Other rabbis ==
- Shlomo Carlebach (1925–1994), composer, singer and pioneer in the Baal Teshuvah movement
- Capers C. Funnye Jr. (1952–), first African-American member of the Chicago Board of Rabbis
- Shlomo Helbrans (1962–2017), rebbe of the Lev Tahor community
- Tamara Kolton (1970–), first rabbi in Humanistic Judaism
- Michael Lerner (1943–), founder/editor of Tikkun magazine
- Jackie Mason (1931–2021), comedian and actor, received smicha from Rabbi Moshe Feinstein
- Zalman Schachter-Shalomi (1924–2014), leader of the Jewish Renewal movement
- Joseph Telushkin (1948–), American rabbi, screenwriter, lecturer and bestselling author (non-denominational)
- Arthur Waskow (1933–2025), leader of the Jewish Renewal movement
- Sherwin Wine (1928–2007), U.S. founder of Society for Humanistic Judaism

== See also ==
- Lists of Jews
- List of Mandaean rabbis
- List of people called Rabbi
- List of rabbis known by acronyms
