= Barry Freundel =

Disgraced American rabbi

Bernard Freundel
- Born: December 16, 1951 (age 74); New York City, New York, United States
- Occupations: Former rabbi and professor
- Spouse: Sharon Freundel (divorced according to Jewish law)
- Children: 3
- Status: Released April 1, 2020
- Conviction: Pleaded guilty to 52 counts of voyeurism
- Penalty: 6 years and 6 months imprisonment, $13,000 in fines

Bernard "Barry" Freundel (born December 16, 1951) is an American former rabbi. The leader of Kesher Israel Congregation in Washington, D.C., from 1989 until 2014, Freundel was regarded as "a brilliant scholar," a "profound" orator and an authority in several areas of halakha (Jewish law), including eruvim, which he assisted in constructing in a number of cities, including Washington.

Freundel's career came to a sudden end in October 2014 when he was arrested by the Metropolitan Police Department of the District of Columbia and charged with committing voyeurism of several women in a mikveh (Jewish ritual bath). Kesher Israel immediately suspended him without pay and later notified the congregants that he had been fired. Similarly, he was also suspended from membership in the Vaad and the Rabbinical Council of America (RCA), the main professional association for Modern Orthodox rabbis in the United States. He also was suspended from his multiple academic positions. He was assistant professor of rabbinics at Baltimore Hebrew University, where he was the rabbinic studies graduate program adviser, associate professor at Towson University and adjunct lecturer at the Georgetown University Law Center. Towson University immediately opened its own administrative review of Freundel's conduct with students, while Georgetown University began its own investigation as well.

Freundel ultimately pleaded guilty to 52 counts of voyeurism and was sentenced to six-and-a-half years in prison and fined $13,000. On August 28, 2018, the $100 million class action lawsuit which had been brought on behalf of the victims against Freundel and the organizations he was associated with was dropped in lieu of a settlement of $14.25 million, to be paid by the insurance of the parties named in the suit. He was expected to be released on August 21, 2020, but was released early on April 1, 2020, due to COVID-19.

== Education ==
Freundel earned a Bachelor of Science at Yeshiva College with a double major in chemistry and physics, along with a concurrent B.S. from the Erna Michael College of Hebraic Studies. He received a master's degree in Talmudic studies from the Bernard Revel Graduate School and his semikhah (rabbinic ordination) from Rabbi Isaac Elchanan Theological Seminary (RIETS), part of Yeshiva University. He earned his Ph.D. at the Baltimore Hebrew University.

== Career ==
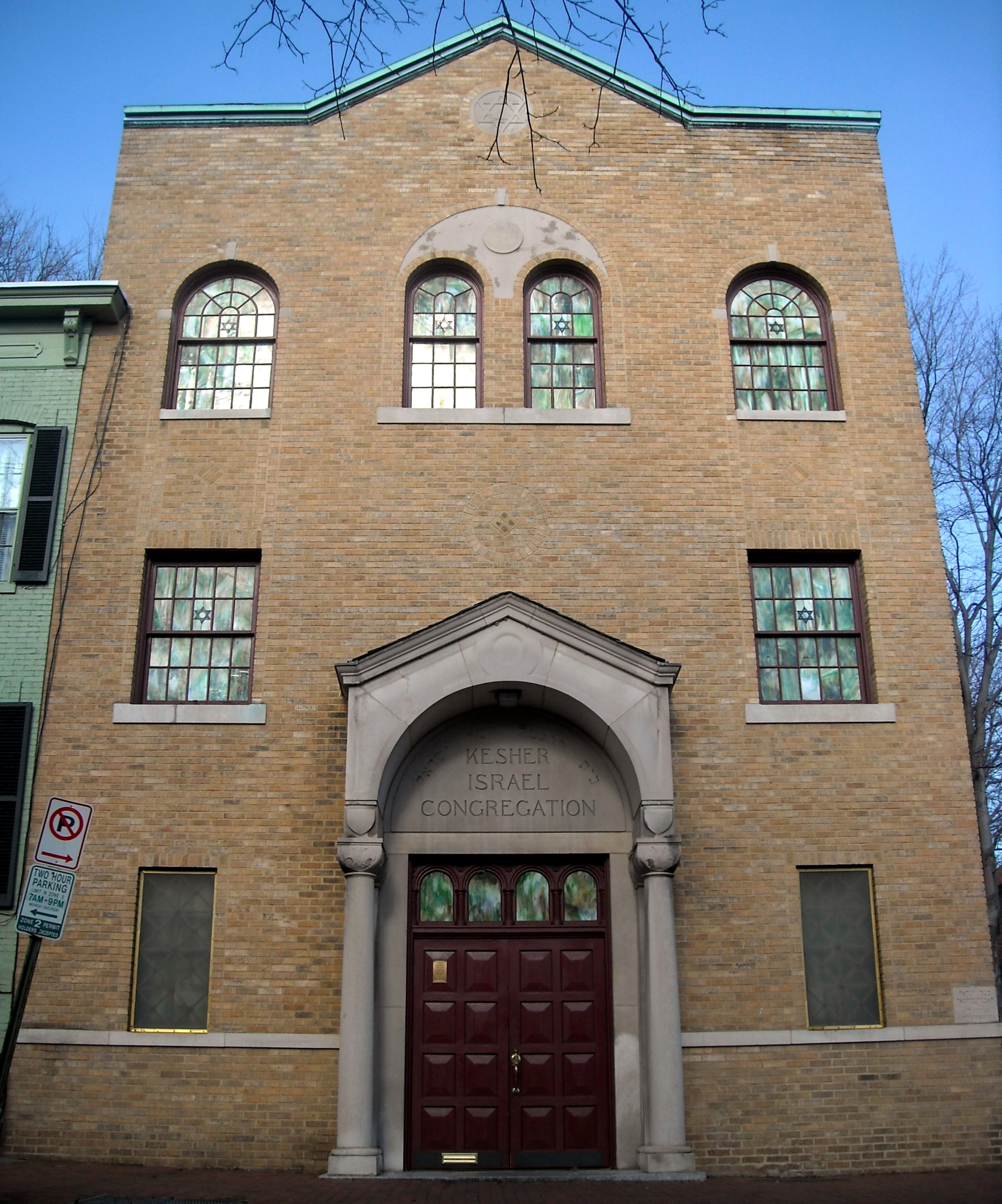
Kesher Israel, the Georgetown synagogue

Freundel served congregations in Great Neck, New York, Norwalk, Connecticut and Yonkers, New York before assuming the pulpit at Kesher Israel, a prestigious Washington synagogue located in the capital's exclusive Georgetown neighborhood, whose members have included Cabinet secretaries and members of Congress.

Freundel had been an adjunct at a number of universities in the past, including American University and the University of Maryland, College Park.

As a writer and lecturer, Freundel addressed topics ranging from environmentalism to Jewish medical ethics. He had served as a visiting scholar at Princeton, Yale and Cornell and guest lecturer at Columbia and the University of Chicago. Due to his congregation's proximity to Georgetown University, he lectured at that institution with particular frequency. Similarly, his proximity to Capitol Hill had facilitated his participation in governmental affairs as a consultant and commentator.

Freundel served as consultant to the Ethics Review Board of the National Institute on Aging of the National Institutes of Health and consultant to the United States Presidential Commission on Cloning (May 1997).

In the past, he had served as pre-rabbinics advisor and assistant director of synagogue services at Yeshiva University (August 1986 - June 1989), as a member of Yeshiva University's Rabbinic Alumni Association Executive Committee, and as a vice-president of the RCA, whose conversion committee he headed.

Freundel appeared on the episode of Da Ali G Show entitled "War."

== Voyeurism charges and conviction ==
=== Arrest, arraignment and investigation ===
On October 14, 2014, police took Freundel from his synagogue-owned residence in handcuffs and, pursuant to a search warrant, removed computers and other items from the premises. One day later, Freundel was arraigned and charged with six counts of voyeurism, a misdemeanor, for allegedly filming women while they were undressing before immersing themselves in the National Capital Mikvah, an independent facility that Freundel was instrumental in founding in 2005. Assistant U.S. Attorney Sharon Marcus Kurn told the judge that Freundel "violated the laws up in the heavens and down," but he pleaded not guilty to these initial charges and was released on his own recognizance under condition that he stay away from and have no contact with the synagogue and the mikvah, which are located in adjacent buildings.

The police acted after the National Capital Mikvah's lay leadership handed them a suspicious clock radio the rabbi had placed in the shower room at the mikvah, a ritual bath that is used as part of the conversion ritual, by married Orthodox women following menstruation and childbirth and by some Orthodox men before the onset of the Sabbath and major Jewish holidays. "Upon receiving information regarding potentially inappropriate activity, the Board of Directors quickly alerted the appropriate officials," it noted in a statement published upon Freundel's arrest and suspension. "Throughout the investigation, we cooperated fully with law enforcement and will continue to do so." A witness told the police that Freundel was observed placing the clock radio in the mikvah shower room and, when he was discovered doing so, he claimed that he was repairing the ventilation. A police inspection of the clock radio found that it contained a video camera whose memory revealed surreptitious recordings of six different women changing — and moving images of Freundel himself setting up the camera. Detectives said that as many as 200 women could have been recorded without their knowledge. A forensic examination determined that several media storage devices found in Freundel's home contained copies of videos backed up from the camera's memory card.

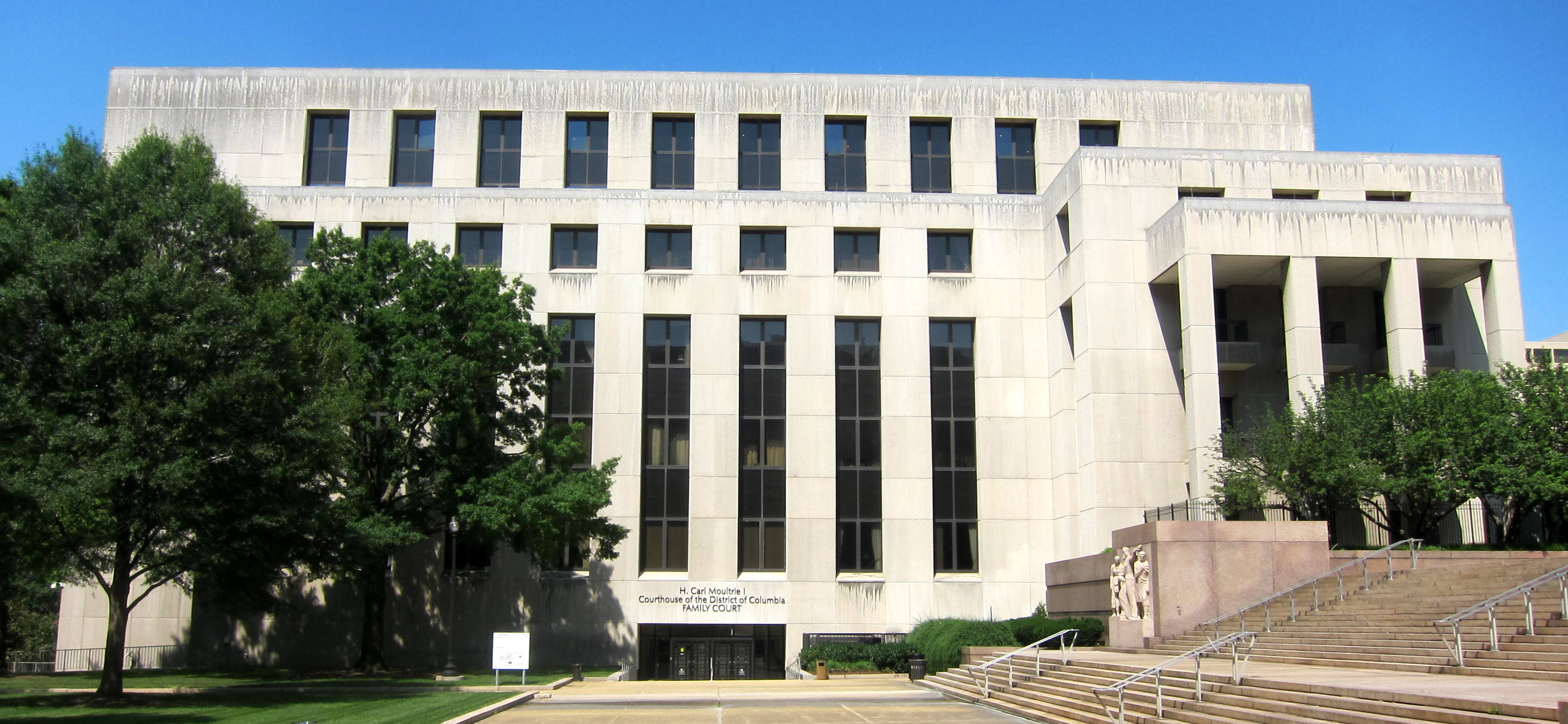
Superior Court of the District of Columbia

According to a search warrant, Freundel may not only have set up spying and recording devices at his synagogue and at the mikvah, but also at Towson University. A search of Freundel's Towson office revealed several small cameras hidden in everyday items, multiple computer storage devices, and a list of handwritten names.

On November 12, district prosecutors told a D.C. Superior Court judge they needed more time to investigate and determine if there were additional victims. The court was informed that a web site was being created in order to reach other victims. On January 16, 2015, the prosecution requested another one-month delay to complete their review of all the video evidence obtained from computers seized by police in the hope to identify additional victims.

=== Reactions ===
"We are appalled by the accusations against Rabbi Barry Freundel and wish to stress that the acts attributed to him are atrocious and strictly against Jewish law," a spokesman for the Chief Rabbinate of Israel stated.

The day Freundel was arrested, the president of the RCA, Rabbi Leonard Matanky, revealed that the Council investigated allegations earlier in the year that related to "ethical issues that came up regarding an issue with a woman," but no action was taken. That may have been a reference to overnight train rides Freundel booked in May 2013 to and from Chicago, where he supposedly was to "conduct research." It later transpired that he had traveled on both legs of the round-trip journey with a woman who was not his wife, with whom he shared a private sleeping berth.

On October 20, the RCA issued a press release stating that it discovered in 2012 that Freundel had coerced conversion candidates into performing clerical work at his home and contributing money to his rabbinic court. The RCA also was able to confirm that he shared a checking account with a conversion candidate. At the time the RCA did not view these activities as rising to the level that would require Freundel's suspension, but did suspend him once he was arrested and, together with its affiliated Beth Din of America, launched its own investigation led by Allen Fagin, the chief professional at the Orthodox Union, and Eric Goldstein, CEO of the UJA-Federation of New York.

Under the leadership of the synagogue's president, Elanit Jakobovic, the synagogue directed all its attention to the victims of his actions by arranging a support group led by a licensed psychologist and consultations with therapists, as well as organizing a closed-to-the-media community meeting with Cathy L. Lanier, Washington's chief of police. Two days after Freundel's arrest and suspension, Jakabovics addressed a packed synagogue at Shemini Atzeret services, declaring: "These sacred spaces — our shul and our mikvah — have now been tarnished. Our inviolability has been violated. Kesher and the mikvah will be a safe place again."

Freundel's arrest also sparked widespread debate about how mikvaot should be supervised, administered and protected from predators. Bethany Mandel, a writer who was converted by Freundel (and who he secretly filmed in the Georgetown mikvah on at least two occasions) proposed a ten-point "Bill of Rights" for converts. She was soon named, together with another female convert, to a new RCA committee charged with reviewing the entire conversion process, and was later chosen as one of The Forward 50 in recognition of her initiative. Rabbanit Chana Henkin, the founder and head of Nishmat, the Institute for Advanced Jewish Studies for Women in Jerusalem (who once spoke on the topic of "Women and the Future of Judaism" at Freundel's synagogue), called for a new generation of religiously educated women to take control of the mikvaot.

=== Lawsuits ===
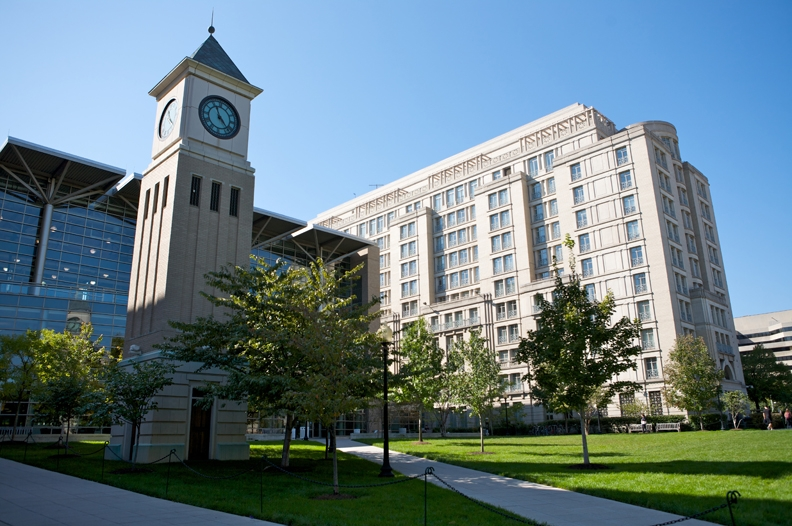
Georgetown University Law Center, where Freundel served as an adjunct lecturer

On December 2, 2014, a student at Georgetown University Law Center, where Freundel taught a seminar on Jewish law, filed a lawsuit against Kesher Israel Congregation, Georgetown University and the National Capital Mikvah. The unnamed student had written a term paper on the mikvah, which received an "A" from Freundel, who had convinced her to immerse herself at the mikvah on two occasions, both of which she presumes he filmed. She sought class action status and claimed that the defendants turned a blind eye and failed in their responsibility to protect students from the rabbi, whose behavior she claimed was becoming ever more bizarre, and who was mistreating women subjected to his authority. On December 18, a student at Towson University identified only as "Stephanie" added her name to the lawsuit, claiming that Freundel encouraged her to take a "practice dunk" in the mikvah as part of her studies, even though she was not Jewish and had no interest in converting. She was joined by Emma Shulevitz, a woman who had been converting to Judaism under Freundel's auspices and who had likewise been encouraged by him to take a "practice dunk," an anomaly that he said would help prevent any misstep on the day of the conversion. They added the RCA as a defendant as well.

The plaintiffs claimed that the RCA and Freundel's synagogue were aware of his inappropriate conduct before the cameras were discovered in the ritual bath he supervised. They charged that the RCA and Kesher Israel should have removed Freundel from his positions of authority and that his alarming actions included inviting non-Jewish women to use the mikvah and inventing and encouraging the use of "practice dunks." In response, RCA issued the following statement: "The RCA has conducted itself appropriately and is taking important steps to improve its conversion protocols. We will defend ourselves vigorously in this matter." Kesher Israel responded with this statement: "Kesher Israel's leadership is deeply concerned about the harm caused by Rabbi Freundel's actions — of which we did not and could not have known — and for the personal welfare of all those individuals who may have been violated. The lawsuits that were recently filed are completely without merit. Our energies remain focused on working towards healing our community and building a vibrant future for Kesher Israel."

In 2015, a congregant brought lawsuit against Freundel for allegedly transferring tens of thousands of dollars from her personal bank account into accounts of his own and in name of some of his children. She claimed she gave Freundel power of attorney when she traveled abroad and asked him to ensure should anything happen to her, she would have a Jewish burial. She also believed he used her apartment as a safehouse where he filmed at least one victim of domestic violence. While she was preparing an appeal in this litigation, she died and there was no one to continue the litigation on behalf of her estate. Right before her death, she was distraught that the rabbi's wife claimed in a deposition that she barely knew her, when she viewed the Freundels as her closest family.

Lawsuits against Freundel and defendants began to gain steam in June 2016, when the Superior Court of the District of Columbia issued an order outlining the consolidation of claims against Freundel. Sanford Heisler, LLP was appointed interim class counsel by the court, and co-counseled with the D.C. law firm of Chaikin, Sherman, Cammarata & Siegel, P.C., which filed one of the first class action lawsuits against Freundel, Kesher Israel, the National Capital Mikvah, and the Rabbinical Council of America in December 2014. On August 16, 2016, the lawsuit was amended to add an additional defendant, the Beth Din of America.

On October 22, 2018, the D.C. Superior Court approved a $14.25 million class action settlement. According to the terms of the finalized settlement, women identified as having been videotaped by Freundel were entitled a base payment of $25,000. A $2,500 base payment was available to women who used the mikvah but were not confirmed as having been videotaped, and who suffered emotional distress after learning of Freundel's actions. Class members were also entitled to supplemental payment based on their individual experiences.

=== Plea bargain ===
On February 11, prosecutors informed victims that of all the women appearing in the recordings seized from Freundel's home and office, only 152 could be positively identified from headshots submitted to the police department via email in the preceding weeks. Since evidence collection was conducted passively, with the Metropolitan Police accepting reports rather than seeking them out, many more women who had been recorded did not submit photographs to be considered for purposes of prosecution (or, in the case of students, mistakenly submitted them instead to campus police). Moreover, an untold number of recordings seized in the initial raid had been deleted and were not reconstructed by police. No charges were pursued for criminal trespass in connection with the rabbi's unauthorized use of the mikvah for unlawful purposes nor in connection with his transport of the recordings or of women for sexual purposes across state lines.

Several dozen recordings of the 152 women positively identified fell outside the criminal statute of limitations. A handful of women requested not to have charges brought in connection with the recordings of them. Charges were brought per victim rather than per recording, so that multiple recordings of the same victim were treated as one count. All of the foregoing had the effect of whittling down the counts of voyeurism ultimately filed against the Rabbi to 88. Despite longstanding court procedures designed to protect the identity of victims of sexual assault, Assistant U.S. Attorney Amy Zubrensky cautioned victims against a trial, warning that it could expose the graphic recordings to the jury and media as well as opening them to cross-examination. Instead, Freundel would be offered a plea bargain that would not exclude the possibility of incarceration.

The plea bargain was delivered to Freundel's attorney on February 18. In a court hearing the next day, Freundel pleaded guilty to 52 counts of voyeurism, one for each woman (not per instance of recording) whom prosecutors identified as having been recorded during the previous three years and who had not declined to have charges brought on her account. Assistant U.S. Attorney Zubrensky noted that in addition to the camera in a clock radio, Freundel had recorded women using mini-cameras embedded in a tissue box and a table-top fan. In addition, he surreptitiously videotaped a domestic violence abuse victim in the bathroom and bedroom of a safe house that he had established for her so she could escape her husband's violence.

=== Sentencing ===
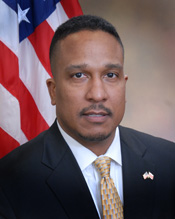
Ronald Machen, United States Attorney for the District of Columbia at the time of Freundel's arrest

Ronald Machen, then the United States Attorney for the District of Columbia, indicated that he would push for a harsh sentence. "Bernard Freundel exploited his position of power to victimize dozens of women who entered a sacred, intimate space of religious ritual," he said. "We will be seeking a prison sentence that reflects the gravity of this disturbing assault on the privacy and dignity of so many victims."

The statutory maximum punishment is a year in jail and a fine of up to $2,500 on each of the first 30 counts and $1,000 on the remainder.

A week before the sentencing, prosecutors submitted a 25-page memorandum to Judge Geoffrey M. Alprin requesting a prison term of 17 years, or four months on each of the 52 counts. In his 12-page response, Freundel's defense attorney asked that his client be spared prison time and sentenced instead to community service. "He has already been punished in that he has lost his employment as a rabbi and is never likely to be so employed again," Freundel's lawyer wrote. "He has been publicly humiliated and his prior reputation as a Judaic scholar, teacher and counselor have been destroyed."

On Friday, May 15, 2015, Freundel was sentenced by Judge Alprin in front of a packed courtroom to six-and-a-half years in prison and fined $13,000. "You repeatedly and secretly violated the trust your victims had in you, and you abused your power," Alprin told Freundel, in handing down the punishment. Beforehand, 18 of Freundel's victims testified about their emotions. "He lectured us about the evils of porn while turning us into his own porn stars," one victim told the court, choking back tears. Another said she fell into a deep depression and began using drugs. "I fell off the edge of this earth," she said. Seven others took the stand on his behalf, several of whom claimed that he was now a changed man. "It tears my guts out to think of the innocent people I've traumatized," Freundel, for his part, told the court, reading from a prepared text. "I am sorry."

"Today the court heard the heart-wrenching accounts of the victims of Barry Freundel's exploitation," noted Acting U.S. Attorney Vincent H. Cohen Jr. of the District of Columbia, in announcing the court's decision. "Their stories make clear the lasting scars that will be left by this outrageous abuse of power. This prosecution was an effort to restore the dignity that Barry Freundel tried to steal from these women. We hope that the scores of victims of his crimes will find some solace in the justice meted out by the court today."

"It is my hope that the many victims in this case draw a small measure of relief from the sentencing action today," added Metropolitan Police Chief Lanier. "His actions wounded an entire religious community and showed a flagrant disregard for his position of trust within that community. I am confident that today's action by the courts will serve to continue the healing process for the many unwitting victims of this predator."

Prosecutors later revealed that among the videos Freundel stored at his residence were several he made of himself in "sexual situations" with other women, many of whom may have been unaware that the liaisons were being recorded.

Freundel was taken from the courtroom to the D.C. Jail, where he was put in isolation for 23 hours a day due to threats against him. He appealed his sentence, claiming that he should have been punished only for a single videotaping, but his appeal was rejected by Judge Alprin on July 31. A second attempt to have his sentence reconsidered, made to the U.S. Court of Appeals for the District of Columbia, was filed on June 21, 2016 but was unanimously rejected on September 15, 2016, by the three-man panel.

=== Aftermath ===
After reviewing the criminal complaint, search and arrest warrants, accompanying affidavits, as well as relevant halakha with respect to the status of prior conversions, the RCA declared that all conversions Freundel had performed until his arrest were valid. After an initial hesitation on its part, the Chief Rabbinate of Israel agreed, but warned that if Freundel were to attempt to perform any conversions in the future, they would not be recognized.

When he was unanimously fired by Kesher Israel's board on November 24, 2014, Freundel was given a grace period until January 1, 2015, to vacate the synagogue-owned rabbinic residence, but one month after the deadline passed he still had not done so. As a result, Kesher Israel referred the matter to the Beth Din of America, asking that it order Freundel to move out, return all synagogue property, compensate the congregation for his occupancy of the house beyond the January 1 deadline, and cover the costs of the arbitration. He finally vacated the house on March 3, leaving it in a state of disrepair that would cost hundreds of thousands of dollars to renovate. This litigation, however, did not involve Freundel's wife, Sharon, who moved out less than three weeks after his arrest. He acceded to her request for a get (a Jewish divorce document) shortly afterwards.

Freundel resigned from his tenured position at Towson University one week after pleading guilty. While he was under suspension he continued to draw a salary, which totaled $30,830.

Freundel was named by The Jewish Daily Forward to its "list of the 50 American Jews who have had the most impact on our national story" in 2014. In explaining his inclusion, the newspaper wrote that "It's hard to imagine a more disturbing violation of a sacred Jewish space than the one of which Orthodox rabbi Barry Freundel is accused." The Israeli newspaper Haaretz ranked the "Peeping Rabbi" as number 1 on its list of "Ten scandals that rocked the Jewish world in 2014," and noted that it did so "because the idea that any rabbi might (allegedly) use hidden cameras to spy on women in their most sacred place like the ritual bath and exploit the vulnerability of conversion candidates to Judaism is unfathomable."

In July 2015 an RCA review panel of six men and five women (including two converts) that was established in the wake of Freundel's arrest released a list of nine recommendations to guide the conversion process. These focused on "support for conversion candidates during and after their conversions, professionalism, transparency of expectations, sensitivity to candidates, educational experiences, the responsibilities and support for rabbis and rabbinic judges, and oversight, supervision, and grievance processing."

Freundel issued a public apology for his "heinous behavior" and "perverse mindset" on September 8, 2015, the eve of the Jewish High Holy Days, which are marked by repentance and forgiveness for sins.

In July 2017, a morality play by a local Washington-area playwright, entitled "Constructive Fictions," which was based on the Freundel scandal, ran at the Gallaudet University theater.

On April 18, 2018, an automated email was sent to those of Freundel's victims who had signed up for updates on the criminal case against him, notifying them that he would be released from prison on August 21. The next day, however, the D.C. Department of Corrections sent a correction, admitting that the previous email was a mistake. Freundel was expected to be released on August 21, 2020, after receiving a one-year sentence reduction due to good behavior. However, he was released early on April 1, 2020, due to COVID-19.

== Positions ==
=== Abortion ===
Freundel believed that according to the halakha, abortion is only permitted when a woman is in "hard travail" and her life is in danger. This is a very limiting position, Freundel pointed out, since there must be serious danger to the mother. This does, however, also include cases where there is significant psychological trauma, wherein continuing the pregnancy could inflict significant or mortal harm to the mother in that fashion (such as a rape victim who becomes suicidal). Freundel believed that there is no way, under Jewish law, to allow partial-birth abortion, since once the head has emerged, the baby is considered to be born.

=== Cloning ===
Freundel saw two issues with cloning humans from a halakhic perspective. The first is whether cloning is allowed, and the second is whether a clone would be considered a human being.

He did not view cloning as being prohibited by halakha, and even saw "becoming a partner with God in the works of creation" as a noble goal. He did, however, support regulation, and at a hearing urged the United States Congress not to prohibit human cloning, but rather to regulate it. He argued that human knowledge and technology are inherently neutral, and it's what's done with them that is important.

Human beings do the best that they can. If our best cost/benefit analysis says go ahead, we go ahead. "God protects the simple" is a Talmudic principle that allows us to assume that when we do our best God will take care of what we could not foresee or anticipate. If things do not work out, the theological question is God's to answer; not ours.

Freundel strongly maintained that a clone would be considered a human being under Jewish law.

=== Homosexuality ===
Freundel published an article entitled Homosexuality and Judaism in the Journal of Halacha and Contemporary Society. In it he argued that there is no category for "homosexual" in halakha. A homosexual then is no different from any other Jew who has committed a sin. Since Freundel viewed homosexuality as an activity rather than a state of being, he advocated the kiruv approach - trying to make a less observant Jew more observant by following halakha.

Judaism rejects the suggestions that homosexuality is either a form of mental illness or an 'acceptable alternate lifestyle.' Judaism's positions would be a third and as yet unconsidered option. Homosexuality is an activity entered into volitionally by individuals, who may be psychologically healthy, which is maladaptive and inappropriate.

=== Modern Orthodoxy ===
Freundel wrote in a published article that "Modern Orthodoxy is not doing very well, because people are not living by its guiding principles. Even those who identify with the movement do not view the world through fealty to halakhah followed by modern modification."

== Published works ==
Freundel was the author of two books, eight journal articles and many op-eds.

- Contemporary Orthodox Judaism's Response to Modernity, Ktav Publishing House, February 2003, ISBN 0-88125-778-8
- Why We Pray What We Pray: The Remarkable History of Jewish Prayer, Urim Publications, November 2010, ISBN 965-524-034-7
