= Orthodox Roundtable =

Orthodox Roundtable (a.k.a. The RCA Roundtable) was a Modern Orthodox rabbinic think tank that functioned from 1988 until 1994. Originally conceived by a group of orthodox rabbis and laypersons in the New York area, the goal of the Roundtable was to promote halakhic discussion of pressing contemporary issues, and to suggest solidly grounded responses to those problems. The solutions offered were meant to reflect authentic, valid halakhic responses that would reflect the spectrum of the Modern Orthodox community. In this sense, the group would provide a counterbalance to the already palpable 'shift to the right' that appeared to characterize orthodox Jewish legal authorities and thinking. From 1990 until 1992, the group was officially part of the Rabbinical Council of America, whose president, Rabbi Marc Angel, was a founding member of the group.

== Early history ==
The initial organization of the Roundtable was undertaken in the Spring of 1988 by Rabbi Jeffrey Woolf, at the behest of prominent lay and rabbinic leaders from Riverdale, NY, where he resided. Woolf, who had studied for ten years under Rabbi Joseph B. Soloveitchik and was a doctoral candidate at Harvard University, was suggested to the founders as a good representative of Modern Orthodox principles. Over the next few months, a group of prominent Orthodox Rabbis agreed to join the initiative. Most, though not all, were graduates of the Rabbi Isaac Elchanan Theological Seminary (RIETS) of Yeshiva University, and had themselves studied under Rabbi Soloveitchik.

The initial core group included: Rabbis J. Simcha Cohen, Reuven Bulka, Yosef Adler, Haskel Lookstein, Marc Angel, Yitz Greenberg, Jacob J. Schacter, Daniel Landes, Mark Dratch, Michael Broyde, Louis Bernstein, Abner Weiss, Daniel Tropper and Saul Berman. The group was later joined by Rabbis Simcha Weinberg and Adam Mintz. In the interim Rabbi Schacter resigned from the group. Rabbis Cohen and Bulka were elected as co-chairmen. Rabbi Woolf was appointed as Executive Chairman.

== Activity ==
Over the course of the next five years, the Roundtable issued a series of position papers on a wide range of cutting edge issues. Generally, these were authored by one member, and vetted by the group prior to publication. Each paper was carefully crafted and extensively documented. The members were well aware of the fact that they were asserting their right to a voice in Orthodox halakhic discourse. As a result, papers were only issued after being carefully reviewed by the most scholarly members of the group (and, on occasion, some who sympathized without actually joining). They were sent primarily to the members of the RCA, though anyone who was interested could receive one.

A significant number of the topics treated by the Roundtable Papers stood at the center of controversy in the Orthodox World, some ten years later. Toward the end of its activity, the group was honored by receiving permission from Rav Ovadiah Yosef to publish an annotated translation of a responsum advocating the imposition of penalties upon a recalcitrant husband who refused to give a get to his wife.

== Cessation of Activity ==
At the time, the groups efforts were both condemned and dismissed by Agudath Yisrael, and a number of the Roshei Yeshiva of RIETS. Primarily, they decried the temerity of these rabbis to venture into the halakhic lists. Responses of this type were reported in the Spring of 1991 in the Jerusalem Report. In an effort to strengthen the position in the community, Rabbi Marc Angel, engineered the adoption of the Roundtable by the Rabbinical Council of America. The merger was successful during Rabbi Angel's tenure. However, following his term in office, elements within and without the RCA sought to restrict and regulate its publications. In 1991, the partnership was dissolved and the Roundtable reverted to its earlier name and format.

Subsequently, the organization was plagued by internal tensions, as well as political pressures. These caused an organizational re-shuffling in 1992, in which Rabbi Cohen resigned as co-chairman. Leadership remained in the hands of Rabbi Reuven Bulka and Rabbi Jeffrey Woolf. In the Summer of 1993, Rabbi Jeffrey Woolf made Aliyah to Israel, in order to accept a faculty position in the Talmud Department of Bar Ilan University. Rabbi Adam Mintz, then the senior rabbi at Lincoln Square Synagogue, succeeded him as Executive Chairman.

The Orthodox Roundtable ceased operations in the Summer of 1994.

== Paper Topics and Authors ==
- On Metzitzah be-Feh (Author: Jeffrey Woolf; signed by all members)
- On Child Adoption and Conversion (Author: Jeffrey Woolf; signed by all members)
- On Smoking (Rabbis Berman, Bulka, Landes and Woolf)
- Reporting Child Abuse (Rabbi Mark Dratch)
- Malbushei Kavod; Shabbat Clothing (Rabbi Mark Dratch)
- The Limits of Parental Authority (Rabbi Reuven Bulka)
- Ball Playing and the Use of Leisure Time on Shabbat (Exchange Between Rabbis J. Simcha Cohen and Saul Berman)
- Changing the Blessing of Nachem on Tisha B'Av (Rabbi Jeffrey Woolf)
- On Recalcitrant Husbands, a Responsum by Rav Ovadiah Yosef, (Translation: Jeffrey Woolf; Annotation: Rabbi Michael Broyde)
