= Bethany Mandel =

American conservative commentator

- Born: Bethany Ann Horowitz; 1986 (age 39–40)
- Education: Rutgers University, New Brunswick (BA)
- Spouse: Seth Mandel
- Children: 6

Bethany Shondark Mandel (born Bethany Ann Horowitz) is an American conservative columnist and political commentator. She is a contributor to the New York Post and Washington Examiner, and is known for her writings on culture, education, and family policy from a right-wing perspective. Mandel was listed among The Jewish Week's "36 under 36" in 2013 and The Forward's "Forward 50" in 2015. In 2019, the Jewish Telegraphic Agency named her one of "50 Jews everyone should follow on Twitter."

== Early life and education ==
Mandel was raised primarily by her mother in the Rochester, New York, area, and has described experiencing periods of poverty during her childhood. Her family relied on government assistance programs including "welfare, Medicaid, and food stamps." Her mother died of lupus when Mandel was 16. At age 18, she changed her surname to her mother's maiden name, Murphy, becoming Bethany Shondark Murphy. Her father, who struggled with opioid addiction, died by suicide when she was 19.

Mandel graduated from Rutgers University in 2008 with a BA in history and Jewish studies.

== Career ==
=== Early work ===
After university, Mandel moved to Washington, D.C., working for the Washington Hebrew Congregation while seeking a role in conservative politics. She subsequently spent a year in Cambodia teaching fifth grade at the Jay Pritzker Academy near Siem Reap.

Returning to Washington, D.C. in 2010, she pursued an Orthodox conversion to Judaism. Her professional work in the conservative sphere began with a fundraising and writing position at The Heritage Foundation, followed by a role as a marketer, editor, and blogger for Commentary magazine. In 2013, The Jewish Week named her one of its "36 under 36" for her role in reinvigorating Jewish public life.

Since 2013, she has worked primarily as a freelance writer and commentator, balancing her career with raising her children at home.

=== Writing and commentary ===
Mandel's commentary frequently addresses education, parenting, and cultural issues from a conservative standpoint. She is a regular contributor to the New York Post and Washington Examiner.

In 2023, she co-authored the book Stolen Youth: How Radicals Are Erasing Innocence and Indoctrinating a Generation with Karol Markowicz, which critiques progressive ideologies in education and culture.

=== Public controversies ===
==== "Woke" definition ====
On March 14, 2023, during an interview on Rising, Mandel struggled to provide a concise definition of the term "woke," a central concept in her then-new book. The awkward exchange, where she stated, "This is going to be one of those moments that goes viral," quickly circulated on social media and news outlets.

In a subsequent Newsweek op-ed, she criticized the interview's tone and offered her definition: "a radical belief system suggesting that our institutions are built around discrimination, and claiming that all disparity is a result of that discrimination. It seeks a radical redefinition of society in which equality of group result is the end point, enforced by an angry mob."

==== COVID-19 pandemic remarks ====
During the COVID-19 pandemic in the United States, Mandel was a vocal critic of prolonged lockdowns and school closures. In a May 2020 tweet, she wrote: "You can call me a Grandma killer. I'm not sacrificing my home, food on the table, all of our docs and dentists, every form of pleasure (museums, zoos, restaurants), all my kids' teachers in order to make other people comfortable. If you want to stay locked down, do. I'm not." She has also consistently opposed mask mandates for children.

=== "Heroes of Liberty" book series ===
Mandel is the editor of the "Heroes of Liberty" series, a line of children's biographies featuring conservative figures. The books are marketed as an alternative to mainstream children's publishing, omitting content on topics like LGBTQ identities that might conflict with conservative values.

In January 2022, a Facebook advertising account for the series was temporarily banned for violating "Low Quality or Disruptive Content" policies, a move Facebook later called a "mistake." The ban drew criticism from conservative commentators and politicians, including Senator Ted Cruz. Mandel has accused the Scholastic Corporation of indoctrinating children by distributing books with themes of race, sexuality, and anti-Americanism through school book fairs.

=== Political activism and school board campaign ===
Mandel has been involved in local education politics. In November 2023, she was a plaintiff in a lawsuit against the Montgomery County school board, alleging she was improperly barred from a school board meeting as a member of the media.

In February 2024, she filed to run for the 4th district seat on the Montgomery County Board of Education. Her platform emphasized refocusing on academics, reinstating school resource officers, and allowing homeschooled children access to public school extracurricular activities. She pledged to recuse herself from matters related to her pending lawsuit if elected. In the May 2024 primary, she received 23.4% of the vote, placing third and not advancing.

== Political views ==
Mandel's commentary aligns with a form of American conservatism, emphasizing limited government, heterosexual family structures, and skepticism of progressive social policies.

On U.S. refugee policy, she expressed concern in 2015 about the resettlement of Syrian refugees in Highland Park, New Jersey, arguing that inadequate support could lead to radicalization. In 2021, she criticized the Biden administration for what she perceived as a slow and disorganized effort to resettle refugees from Afghanistan.

== Personal life ==
Mandel, born to a Catholic mother and a Jewish father, underwent an Orthodox conversion under Rabbi Barry Freundel in 2011 to secure universally recognized Jewish status. She has stated that she left Reform Judaism, which she grew up in, due to its alignment with liberal politics.

In 2014, she learned Freundel had secretly filmed her and other women during conversion rituals. In response, she wrote a widely shared "Convert Bill of Rights" and served on a Rabbinical Council of America (RCA) committee reviewing conversion procedures. Disillusioned by what she saw as the RCA's reluctance to implement substantive reforms, she resigned from the committee and temporarily withdrew from Orthodox institutions before later joining a synagogue in Kemp Mill, Maryland. Her advocacy led to her inclusion in The Forward's "Forward 50" list in 2015.

She is married to commentator Seth Mandel, and they have six children.
