= Adam Mintz =

American Modern Orthodox Rabbi

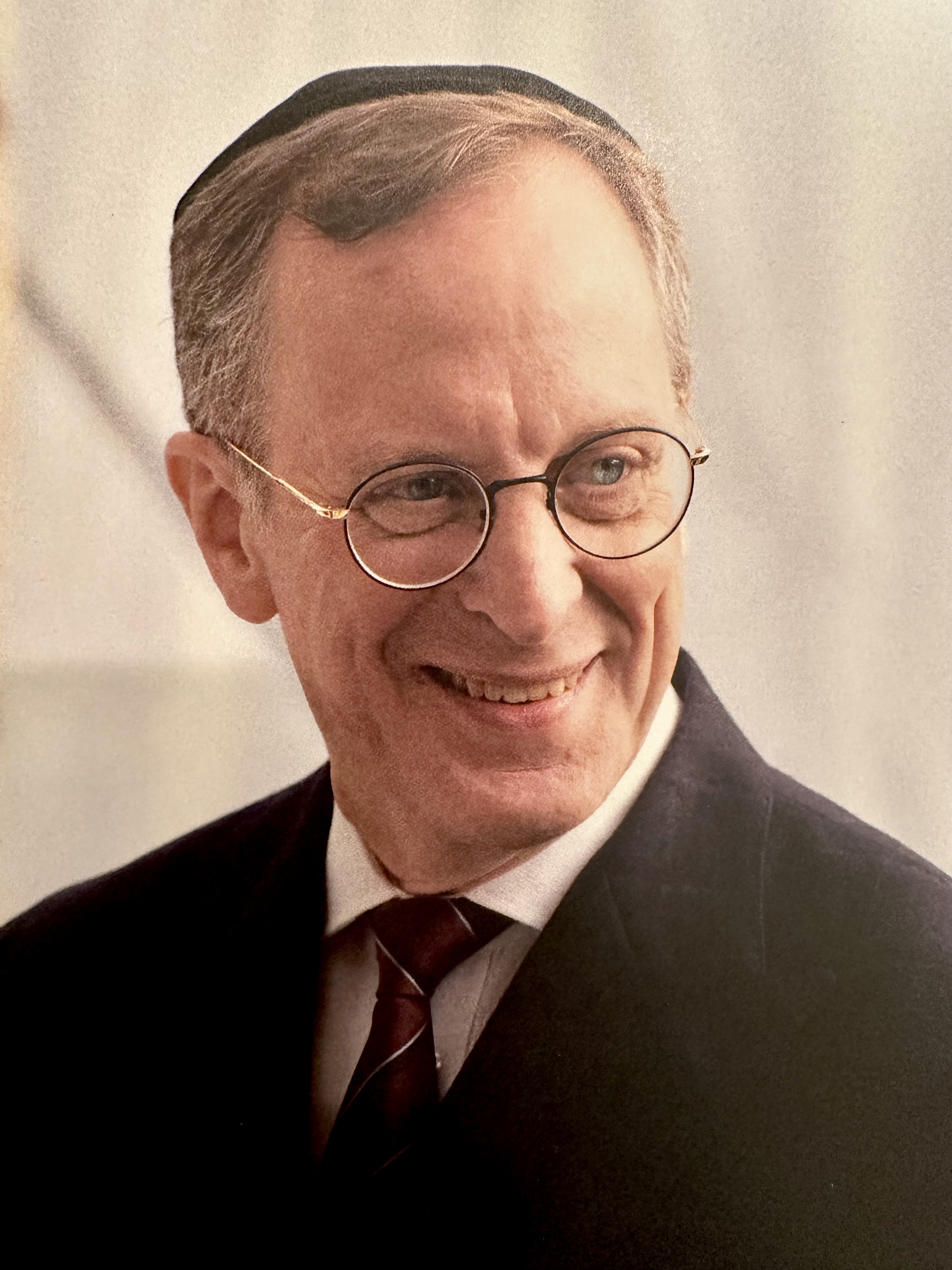
Photograph of Rabbi Adam Mintz

Adam Mintz (born May 15, 1961) is an American Modern Orthodox rabbi, Talmud teacher, professor, and advocate for Orthodox conversions to Judaism and head of the conversion court, Rodfei Zedek. Mintz is the Founding Rabbi of Kehilat Rayim Ahuvim in New York City, a synagogue now known as "The Shtiebel."

== Biography ==
=== Early life and education ===
Mintz was born in Washington, D.C. to Rabbi Benjamin Mintz and Harriet Ashinsky. He attended the Melvin J. Berman Hebrew Academy in Greater Washington before transferring to Manhattan Hebrew High School in Riverdale, New York. Mintz graduated from Yeshiva College in 1984 with a bachelor's degree in Jewish History and a master's degree in Medieval Jewish History.

In 1985, Mintz received Yoreh Yoreh Semikhah (rabbinical ordination) from the Rabbi Isaac Elchanan Theological Seminary at Yeshiva University and in 1988 Yadin Yadin Semikhah, qualifying him to serve as a rabbinical judge.

In 2011, he earned a Ph.D. in Modern Jewish History from New York University, with his doctoral thesis focusing on the history of the eruv in North America.

=== Career ===
Mintz was the Associate Rabbi for Congregation Kehilath Jeshurun on the Upper East Side from 1992 to 1996, and then Senior Rabbi of Lincoln Square Synagogue on the Upper West Side from 1996 to 2004. While at Lincoln Square Synagogue, Mintz hired Julie Stern Joseph, the first woman congregational intern in an Orthodox synagogue in America. In 2004, he founded Kehilat Rayim Ahuvim, a Modern Orthodox synagogue on the Upper West Side. In 2025, Rayim Ahuvim moved to a new location and rebranded as "The Shtiebel."

In 2020, Mintz founded Project Ruth, an organization dedicated to facilitating accessible Orthodox conversions to Judaism. Following the October 7 attacks, the number of people seeking conversion in the United States increased significantly, with Project Ruth emerging as one of the larger Orthodox conversion initiatives in the country. Since 2024, Mintz's conversion court has performed approximately 200 conversions annually, a figure comparable to the more than 200 Orthodox conversions conducted each year through the RCA's conversion network.

Project Ruth has drawn comparisons to Giyur K’Halacha, an independent network of Orthodox conversion courts in Israel. Like Project Ruth, it was established to provide a more accessible framework for Orthodox conversion outside the dominant institutional system.

== Education and Leadership Roles ==
Mintz served on the faculty of Yeshivat Maharat in New York from 2016-2026. Additionally, he founded 929 English, an online platform dedicated to promoting the daily study of the Hebrew Bible. As co-president of the Manhattan Eruv, Mintz expanded the eruv to include most of Manhattan from 146th Street to the southern tip of Manhattan.

Mintz was President of the New York Board of Rabbis, a nondenominational association comprising over 800 rabbis, from 2004 to 2006. He also served as the Liaison to the Jewish Community for William C. Thompson, the Comptroller of New York City. Mintz was a member of the Orthodox Roundtable, a Modern Orthodox rabbinic think tank focused on promoting halakhic discussion and practical responses to contemporary issues.

Mintz was a Tikvah Scholar-at-Large at the Tikvah Center for Law and Jewish Civilization at New York University School of Law from 2012 to 2013. He has also served as an Adjunct Associate Professor of Jewish History at City College and has been a visiting lecturer at Queens College, Brooklyn College, City College and Rutgers University.

== Publications ==
Mintz's works encompass a wide range of topics related to Judaism and Jewish life:

- Building Communities: A History of the Eruv in America
- “The Community Eruv and the American Public Square,” Diné Israel
- “A Chapter in American Orthodoxy: The Eruvin in Brooklyn,” Hakirah
- “Variable, Vital, and Frequently Chaotic: American Jewry,” Jewish Quarterly Review
- “Is Coca-Cola Kosher? Rabbi Tobias Geffen and the History of American Orthodoxy,” in Rav Chesed: Essays in Honor of Rabbi Dr. Haskel Lookstein
- The Talmud in Translation, in Printing the Talmud: From Bomberg to Schottenstein
- Conversion, Intermarriage, and Jewish Identity (editor)
- It’s A Thin Line: Eruv From Talmudic to Modern Culture (editor)
- The Relationship of Orthodox Jews with Believing Jews of Other Religious Ideologies and Non-Believing Jews (editor)
- Jewish Spirituality and Divine Law (editor)

== Personal life ==
Mintz is married to Sharon Liberman who is the Curator of Jewish Art at The Library of The Jewish Theological Seminary Library (JTS) in New York and serves as the Judaica International Senior Specialist, for Sotheby's, where she was responsible for the sale of Codex Sassoon, the world's most expensive book. The couple resides on the Upper West Side and have three children and five grandchildren.
