= Kitzur Shulchan Aruch =

1864 work on Jewish law by Shlomo Ganzfried

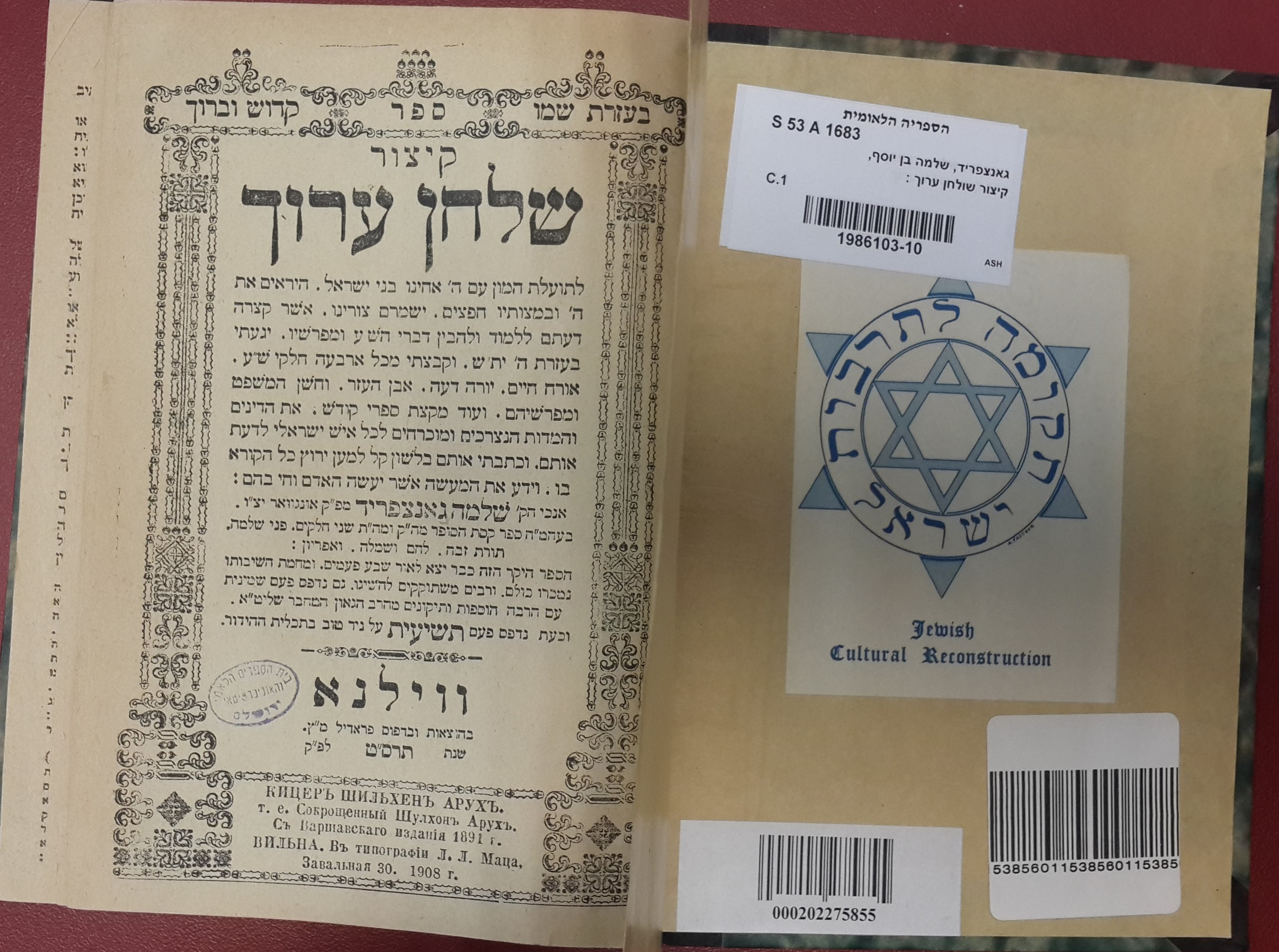
- Vilna Edition, 1908
- Author: Shlomo Ganzfried
- Language: Hebrew
- Subject: Halacha
- Publication date: 1864

The Kitzur Shulchan Aruch (Hebrew: קיצור שולחן ערוך) is a compendium of Halakha written by Rabbi Shlomo Ganzfried in Uzhgorod that summarizes the Shulchan Aruch—mainly the sections "Orach Chayim" and "Yoreh De'ah"—and deals with the laws of daily life, prayer, Shabbat, fasting, marriage, holidays, and other facets of religious Judaism. The work was written in vernacular Hebrew, which made it easy for the layperson to understand and contributed to its popularity.

== Contents ==
The work is a summary (or kitzur) of the sixteenth-century Shulchan Aruch by Rabbi Joseph Caro and has references to later rabbinical commentaries. It focuses on the "Orach Chaim" and "Yoreh Deah" sections of the Shulchan Aruch. It incorporates the Halakha of daily life, Shabbat, holidays, and other things. It is divided into 221 chapters (called simanim).

As the work was written for the laity, it is not as detailed as the Shulchan Aruch itself, while generally following the Shulchan Aruch's structure. Ganzfried expressed his intentions in his introduction:

[This book] includes from the four sections of the Shulchan Aruch, those necessary and essential laws for all people in Yisrael for knowing them, and are written in a simple language and a correct order. It is a good compilation and effective, B'ezrat Hashem, for businessmen that do not have the time to delve into the Shulchan Aruch and its commentaries. They shall find in [this work] that which they require with ease and also [be able to] educate the youth and plant in their hearts the commandments of Hashem in their youth and [so that] also in their later life they will not leave them…

Ganzfried based his decisions on the opinions of three Ashkenazic rabbinical authorities: Rabbis Yaakov Lorberbaum (author of Nesivos HaMishpat), Schneur Zalman of Liadi (author of Shulchan Aruch HaRav), and Abraham Danzig (author of Chayei Adam and Chochmat Adam). In cases of disagreement between the three, Ganzfried adopted the majority view. Caro had already used a similar method to write the Shulchan Aruch in 1563; his rabbinical authorities of reference were Isaac Alfasi, Maimonides, and Asher ben Yechiel.

Ganzfried was a Hungarian Jew who based his work on the customs of the Hungarian Jews of his time. The work is also known for its strict rulings.

== Reception ==
The Kitzur Shulchan Aruch was first published in 1864 and became immensely popular for its simplicity. It is still commonly studied in Orthodox Judaism. Many other works, such as Ben Ish Hai, Chayei Adam and others, are similarly concise and suitable for laypersons as summaries of the Shulchan Aruch but have not reached the level of the Kitzur's popularity.

The Kitzur is not used as a basis for making decisions of a legal nature; instead, rabbis use the full Shulchan Aruch and later works by the Achronim and poskim.

Due to its popularity, this book is often printed with cross-references of other Halakhic works, especially the Shulchan Aruch HaRav and Mishna Berura; a popular edition contains notes by Rabbi Mordechai Eliyahu, entitled Darkeh Halacha, with cross-references of Sephardic rabbinical authorities.

Many editions of the Kitzur include an appendix with the laws about the Land of Israel, which were compiled by the Chazon Ish. There is a commentary by Rabbi Shlomo Zalman Braun on this work, entitled Shearim Metzuyanim be-Halakhah, which examines contemporary problems in the light of the work. Ganzfried, however, stated that comments were not needed for this work since it tried to summarize the Halakha as far as possible and that these comments should be included in the original Shulchan Aruch and not in the Kitzur.

The Kitzur Shulchan Aruch Yomi ("Daily Kitzur Shulchan Aruch") is a daily learning program wherein the study of the Kitzur is completed in one year. The schedule does not follow the contents in order; rather it is arranged such that one reviews the laws of the Jewish holidays in the weeks before each. A person can start learning at any time of the year and complete it over the course of the year. The program is increasingly popular as it requires only 5–10 minutes per day.

== Translations ==
The Kitzur Shulchan Aruch has been translated into English several times. Hyman E. Goldin's translation was published in 1961 with an attempt to eliminate errors and improve upon previous translations, making it "more comprehensible to scholar and layperson alike." Goldin's translation bore the English title "Code of Jewish Law".

The 1980s and 90s saw the publication of two modernized translations, which included cross references similar to those in contemporary Hebrew editions as above. In 1987 Metsudah Publications released a translation by Rabbi Avrohom Davis, and in 1991 Moznaim Publishing released a translation by Rabbi Eliyahu Touger. The Artscroll translation of 2011, under the general editorship of Rabbi Eliyahu Klugman, includes comparisons with the Mishnah Berurah and the Igrot Moshe of Moshe Feinstein. Various other translations are available online.

- Code of Jewish Law. Hebrew Publishing Co. (Transl. Hyman Goldin), 1927. ISBN 0-88482-779-8
- Kitzur Shulchan Aruch. Compact Set. Metsudah Publications, 2006. ISBN 1-931681-99-6
- Kitzur Schulchan Oruch. Moznaim Publishing Corp, 1991. ISBN 0-940118-63-7
- The Kleinman Edition Kitzur Shulchan Aruch. Vol. 1. Artscroll, 2008. ISBN 1-4226-0832-8

It has been translated also into Spanish in two volumes by Rabbi Nosson Grunblatt and published by Kehot Lubavitch Sudamericana, Buenos Aires, Argentina.

== Electronic versions ==
- Full Hebrew text: PDF, Word, Android app
- Full Hebrew and English text online at Sefaria and Chabad.org
- Kitzur Shulchan Aruch Yomi daily calendar

== See also ==
=== Similar works ===
- Chayei Adam and Chochmat Adam by Avraham Danzig (Poland, 1748–1820), similar Ashkenazi works.
- Ben Ish Chai by Yosef Chaim (Baghdad, 1832–1909), a Sephardi work with a similar purpose.
- Kitzur Shulchan Aruch, a similar Sephardi work by Rabbi Raphael Baruch Toledano.
- Kitzur Shulchan Aruch Mekor Hayyim, a similar Sephardi work by Rabbi Hayim David HaLevi.
- The volumes entitled Kitzur Shulchan Aruch from Yalkut Yosef, a similar Sephardi work.
- Kitzur Shulchan Aruch Sefardi by Rabbi Reuven Amar.
- Dat Vadin, a summary of the Shulchan Aruch and Mishne Torah translated to Russian.

=== Other study cycles ===
- Torah study § Study cycles

=== Academic articles ===
- Marienberg, Evyatar (2019). "The 19th-century Kitzur Shulhan Arukh: The story of a classic manual of Jewish law". Religion Compass. 13 (2) e12294. doi:10.1111/rec3.12294. ISSN 1749-8171. S2CID 151138150.
