= Alice Goldfinger =

American rabbi

Alice Goldfinger is an American rabbi.

== Life ==
Goldfinger made national news after suffering a traumatic brain injury in a fall in 2009 that destroyed her short-term memory. Goldfinger had been working as a rabbi at Congregation Bet Ha’am in Maine for a decade, but had to leave due to her injury.

In 2011, she led parts of the Kabbalat Shabbat service at the Orthodox synagogue Shaarey Tphiloh at the invitation of its rabbi Akiva Herzfeld, despite the fact that women are not traditionally allowed to lead prayers in Orthodox Judaism. In 2013 Goldfinger nominated Akiva Herzfeld as one of "America’s Most Inspiring Rabbis," listed by The Jewish Daily Forward.

Goldfinger is also known for establishing a soup kitchen at Congregation Sherith Israel in San Francisco.
