= Hyman Goldin =

American rabbi

Rabbi Hyman E. Goldin, LL.B. (March 15, 1881, near Vilna – March 1971) was a Lithuanian-American Orthodox Rabbi, attorney and Judaic scholar. A prolific author of English Jewish literature, he wrote over fifty works.

Hyman Elias Goldin studied at the Yeshiva of Vilna, where he was ordained a rabbi. According to a possibly-apocryphal story, Goldin was dismissed from the Yeshiva for studying the writings of Charles Darwin at a time when Orthodox Jews considered evolution a to be heresy. He emigrated from the Eishyshok shtetl in Lithuania to the United States in 1900, and settled in Brooklyn.

Goldin purchased 360 acres of land in the Adirondack Mountains and established children's summer camps and the Blue Sky Lodge Hotel, which became a meeting ground for modern Orthodox thinkers.

Jewish chaplain to Comstock Prison from 1932 to 1947, Goldin collaborated with two prisoners to write a Dictionary of American Underworld Lingo (1950). His The Case of the Nazarene Reopened (1948), written in the form of a court transcript, acquitted the Jews of the charge of killing Jesus Christ.

Goldin translated the Kitzur Shulchan Aruch, an abridged version of the Shulchan Aruch (The standard code of Jewish law), publishing his translation in 1961. He also authored works on Jewish history, family life, religious festivals, Hebrew and Yiddish primers, and translated several works of the Mishnah. One of his most notable works is Hamadrikh: The Rabbi's Guide, still used to this day to ordain Orthodox Jewish Rabbis.

His grandson, Rabbi Shmuel Goldin, is Rabbi Emeritus of Congregation Ahavath Torah (Englewood, NJ) and a past president of the RCA.
