= Steven Dworken =

American rabbi and author

Rabbi Steven Dworken

Personal life
- Born: 1945
- Died: 2003 (aged 57–58)
- Education: Yeshiva University (B.A., M.S., Th.D., Semikhah); (M.A.)
- Occupation: Rabbi

Religious life
- Religion: Judaism
- Denomination: Modern Orthodox Judaism (Open Orthodoxy)
- Semikhah: RIETS

Steven Dworken (1945–2003) was a Modern Orthodox rabbi and organizational leader. He was the rabbi of Congregation Anshe Chesed of Linden, New Jersey for twenty-two years. He also was the Executive vice president of the Rabbinical Council of America at the time of his passing. At Yeshiva University he was the assistant director of RIETS' Max Stern Division of Communal Services. He directed rabbinic services program at Yeshiva University and was president of RIETS' Rabbinic Alumni. At the beginning of his career, he served as assistant rabbi of Congregation Agudath Sholom in Stamford, Connecticut between 1969 and 1971. Then he served as rabbi of the Shaarey Tphiloh congregation in Portland, ME until 1976 and went on be a national religious leader. Dworken joined the leadership of the Rabbinical Council after the passing of Rabbi Joseph B. Soloveitchik. He guided the organization through some difficult controversies, and took an inclusive stance on the inclusion of gay victims of the Holocaust at the US Holocaust memorial in DC. Rabbi Dworken was able to have a lasting influence on many people who came to Orthodox Judaism from other denominations. He is remembered to have said, “The trick to being a rabbi is being able to love Jews, especially those that aren’t always so loveable.”

== See also ==
- Rabbinical Council of America
