= Zev Segal =

Rabbi Zev Segal

Personal life
- Born: January 7, 1917 Saratov, Russia
- Died: March 5, 2008 (aged 91) Jersey City, United States
- Buried: Jerusalem, Israel
- Spouse: Esther Piperburg
- Children: Nachum, Moshe, Yigal, Chaim Nathan, Leah, and Peninah

Religious life
- Religion: Judaism
- Denomination: Orthodox

Jewish leader
- Predecessor: Pesach Levovitz
- Successor: Bernard L. Berzon
- Synagogue: Young Israel of Newark
- Organisation: Rabbinical Council of America
- Began: 1968
- Ended: 1971
- Semikhah: Skokie Yeshiva

Zev Segal (January 7, 1917 – March 5, 2008) was an Orthodox Jewish rabbi.

== Biography ==
Segal was born in Saratov, Russia and moved to Palestine as a toddler. He survived the 1929 Hebron massacre. He was the founding rabbi of the Young Israel of Newark, and served there for thirty-three years, from 1945 to 1978. During this period, Segal also served a three-year term as president of the Rabbinical Council of America, from 1968 to 1971.

Segal was the father of radio broadcaster Nachum Segal, and Rabbi Nate Segal of Staten Island.

Segal was found dead in his car at the bottom of the Hackensack River on March 6, 2008, after being reported missing a day earlier. He was traveling from an appearance on his son's radio show to an appointment in Livingston, New Jersey. Segal was 91.
