= Ida Crown Jewish Academy =

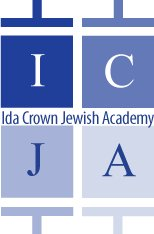

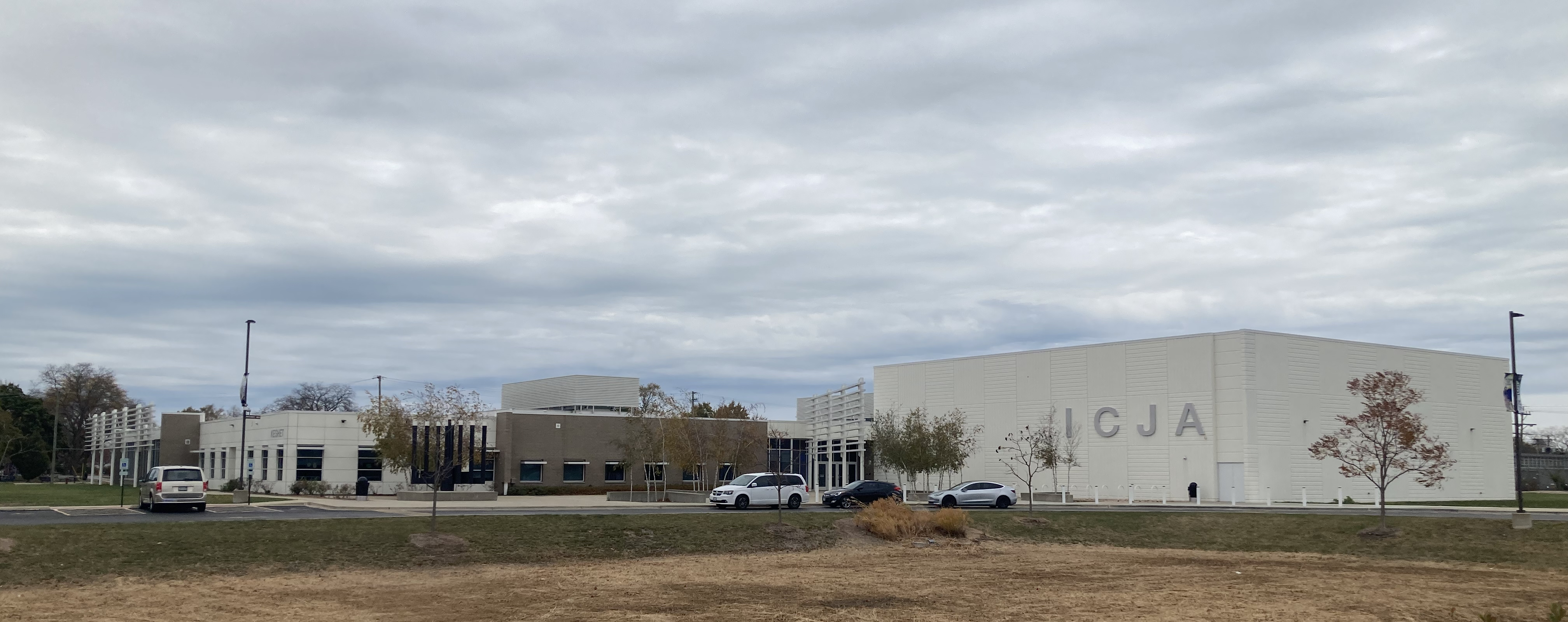

Location
- 8233 Central Park Avenue; Skokie, Illinois 60076; United States; 42.031677°N 87.717774°W

Information
- Type: Parochial; Coed
- Motto: Inspiring Bnei and Bnot Torah to thrive in the Modern World
- Religious affiliation: Modern Orthodox
- Established: 1942
- Dean: Leonard Matanky
- Faculty: 36.0 FTEs
- Enrollment: 216 (as of 2022)
- Student to teacher ratio: 6.8:1
- Campus: Suburban
- Colors: Blue, White, and Red
- Mascot: Ace
- Nickname: Ida Crown, ICJA, The Academy
- Rival: Rochelle Zell Jewish High School and Fasman Yeshiva High School
- School fees: $1,430
- Tuition: $25,900 (2022)
- Website: www.icja.org

Ida Crown Jewish Academy is a Modern Orthodox Jewish high school in Skokie, Illinois, under the auspicies of the Associated Talmud Torahs. Its current dean is Leonard Matanky. ICJA places emphasis on both Judaic and Secular studies and holds its students to high academic standards. ICJA encourages its students to pursue a year in yeshiva or seminary in Israel before attending college. Ida Crown serves students from all over the Chicago area, including Chicago, Lincolnwood, Skokie, Northbrook, Highland Park, Glencoe, Deerfield, Buffalo Grove, Des Plaines, and Evanston.

As of the 2021-22 school year, the school had an enrollment of 216 students and 36.0 classroom teachers (on an FTE basis), for a student–teacher ratio of 6.8:1.

== History ==
Leaders from the Associated Talmud Torahs (ATT) and Hebrew Theological College met in 1942 to address growing educational concerns. The primary problem centered around the fact that many Jewish children began to drop their studies around bar mitzvah time, setting the scene for rampant assimilation and a loss of tradition. They eventually established a plan: to create a high school which taught Judaic studies. Ideally, these students would move on to pursue Jewish higher education.

The school began as Chicago Jewish Academy and was first located on the West side of Chicago. It was situated on the corner of Douglas Blvd. and St. Louis Ave. and began as a coeducational junior high school with grades 6–10; subsequent grades were added with each upcoming year. The school became a complete four-year secondary school in September 1945. The first Commencement ceremony took place in June 1946.

By that time, the school outgrew its facilities. The ATT purchased the building of the Metropolitan Masonic Temple in the Garfield Park area; the school moved to the building in 1947. The three-story building was remodeled during the two-year waiting period to accommodate the needs of an academy.

Despite ample room and much progress, the West side of Chicago began to deteriorate as a whole by the early 1960s. The Academy was forced by virtue of circumstances to relocate in 1961 to the Torah Center. The move helped catalyze the institution of a new branch, a yeshiva; a section of the high school for boys, which included intensified Talmudic studies. To satisfy the needs of parents and help hinder overcrowding, a third branch, a Girls' school, was established in September 1967.

The Chicago Jewish Academy made another move in 1968 due to overcrowding. To fund the move, the ATT proposed a campaign to raise funds for a building to house up to 400 students. This building, in the West Ridge area, a center of Jewish community regionally, was named the Ida Crown Jewish Academy, after a generous donation from the Crown family.

Later, the Academy would drop its junior high school, and both branches became their own separate Jewish high schools. The Yeshiva became Fasman Yeshiva High School, in Skokie, and the Girls' School became Hannah Sacks Bais Yaakov. Still, the atmosphere and philosophy has generally remained the same over more than fifty years of progress.

Ida Crown Jewish Academy made another move, this time to Skokie, to satisfy a student body that is primarily from the North Shore area and to address overcrowding at the current building. The building, the Esformes Family Campus, officially opened for learning on January 4, 2016.

== Statistics ==
- Days in year: 165
- Hours in day: 9.67
- Enrollment: 216
- Tuition (2022–2023): $25,900/student

== Recent athletic achievements ==
- The wrestling team won the 2012 team IHSA Class 1A Regional at Walther Lutheran, the first regional title for ICJA, and the first regional wrestling title won by any Jewish high school in the US. Following the COVID pandemic the wrestling team competed and won the Wittenberg Invitational Tournament three years in a row: 2024, 2025, and 2026.
- The baseball team came in 1st at the Columbus Baseball Invitational 2011, 2014, 2018, and 2022
- Yeshiva University's Red Sarachek Tournament Champions 2008.
- Boys' basketball team won the Joseph Weiner Memorial Basketball Tournament in 1990 and 1995 and 2008; Girls' team won in 1994

Men's Teams:

- Basketball
- Baseball
- Cross Country
- Fencing
- Wrestling
- Soccer

Women's Teams:

- Basketball
- Cross Country
- Fencing
- Soccer

== Curriculum ==
- Levels: 0, not calculated into G.P.A.; 1.0, Modified/Regulars; 2.0, Honors—A is 5.0, B, 4.0, and so forth.
- Scheduling: Arrival at 8:05 am; prayer and breakfast until 9:05; followed by twelve thirty-nine-minute periods. Day ends at 5:39 pm.

=== General Studies ===
- Requirements: Hebrew, 4 years

=== Judaic Studies ===
- Required.
- Single-gender classes for Judaic studies.
- Boys' track: Four years of Tanakh and Talmudic Studies
- Girls' track: Four years of Tanakh; one year of Mishnah; three years of either Talmud or Jewish philosophy/Oral Law; one half-year on family purity.

== Notable alumni ==
- David Draiman (born 1973), lead singer for the band Disturbed
- Yochi Dreazen, Deputy managing editor and foreign editor of Vox
- Nosson Tzvi Finkel, former Rosh Yeshiva of the Mir yeshiva in Jerusalem
- Gil Hoffman, Executive Director HonestReporting
- Rachel Goldberg Polin, Hostage Advocate
- Jon Polin, Hostage Advocate
- Jeff Seidel, director of the Jewish Student Information Center in Jerusalem and other Israeli cities

== See also ==
- History of the Jews in Chicago
- Jewish education
- Menora v. Illinois High School Association, court case on religious freedom involving Ida Crown
