= 929: Tanakh B'yachad =

929: Tanakh B'yachad (Hebrew: Bible Together, 929 - תנך ביחד) is a project for learning one chapter of Tanakh per day (except Friday and Saturday), totaling 5 chapters per week. The name '929' refers to the total number of chapters in the Tanakh.

== History ==
The project was announced by the Israeli Education Ministry, and began on December 21, 2014. The first cycle was completed on April 18, 2018, coinciding with Israel's 70th Independence Day.

The first cycle of the project offered content in Hebrew only. The second cycle, which began on July 15, 2018, offers some content in English as well and there is a separate 929 English, which was founded by Rabbi Adam Mintz. It concluded on February 2, 2022. The third cycle began on February 6, 2022, and concluded on August 27, 2025..

== See also ==
- Torah study § Study cycles
