= Julie Stern Joseph =

Julie Stern Joseph was the first woman hired as a congregational intern at an Orthodox synagogue. She was hired in 1998 by the Lincoln Square Synagogue of the Upper West Side in New York, which was led by Rabbi Adam Mintz. As a congregation intern, Stern Joseph met with girls who were preparing for their bat mitzvah ceremonies, counseled women on matters such as how to prepare for the mikvah, taught an adult education class, and visited sick congregants in the hospital. She also preached once a month; her first "sermonette", as the synagogue called it, was about why Moses was the perfect model of Jewish leadership.

From 1991 until 1993 (and in 1997), Stern Joseph was a student at Midreshet Lindenbaum in Jerusalem. She has also earned a Master's in Jewish history from NYU.

In 2005, her book Am I My Mother's Daughter?: A Search for Identity was published. As of 2012, she is an adjunct instructor in Jewish History at Stern College.
