= Nachum Segal =

American radio host

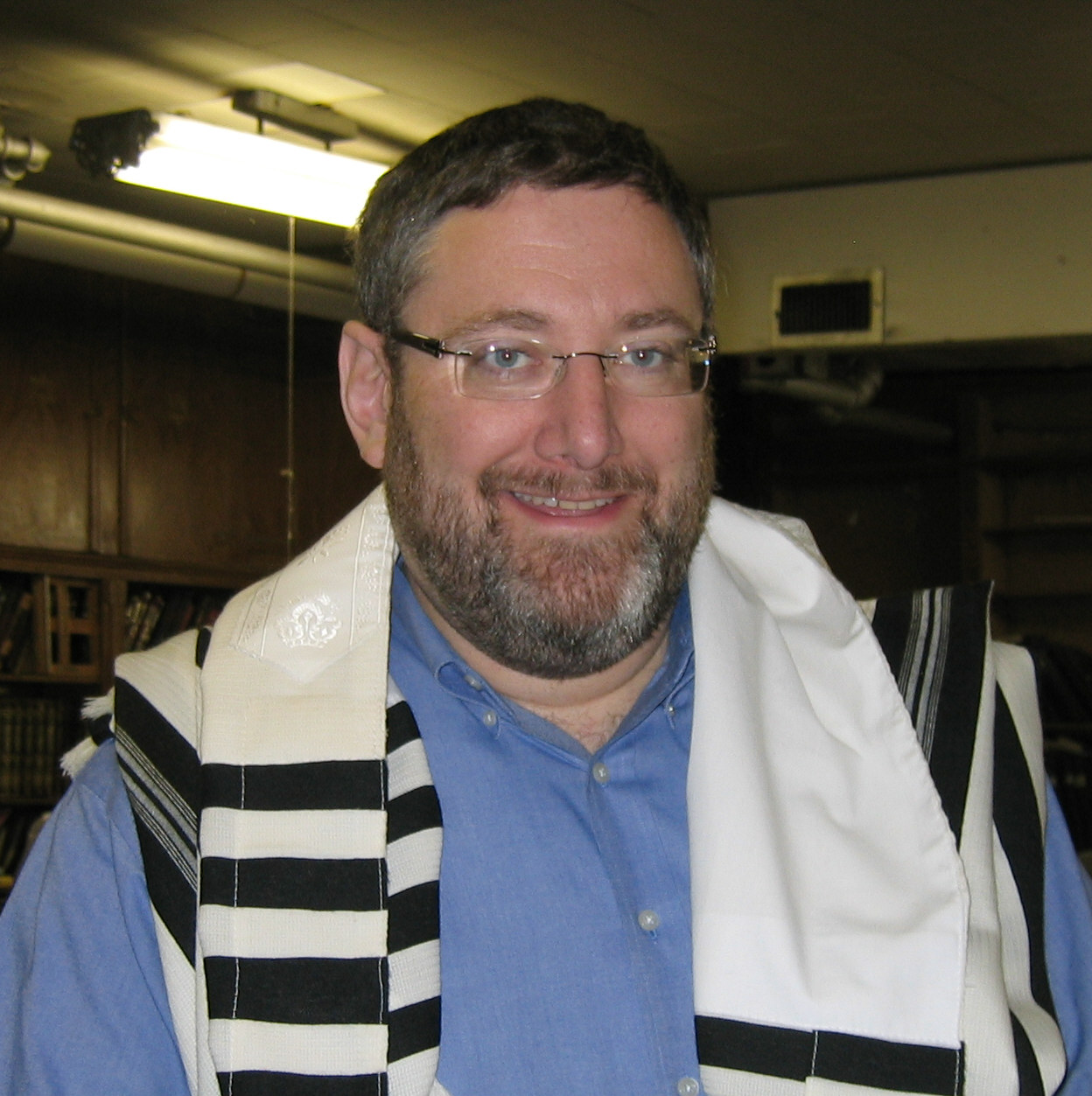
- Segal in 2008
- Born: 1963 (age 62–63)
- Education: Yeshiva University
- Occupation: Radio host
- Years active: 1981–present
- Spouse: Staci
- Children: Binyamin, Chava, Yosef, Yehoshua, Yonina, Gavriel
- Father: Zev Segal
- Website: www.nachumsegal.com

Nachum Segal (born 1963) is an American radio host. He has hosted the program Jewish Moments in the Morning (commonly abbreviated as JM in the AM) since September 1983. Every morning from 6-9 Segal runs his show. The show includes music, interviews, news reports and much more. Also throughout the day the Nachum Segal Network has a number of different programs. Segal also serves as the president of the Nachum Segal Network.

== Early career ==
A graduate of Mesivta Ohr Torah in Riverdale and Yeshiva University's Yeshiva College, Segal began his radio career at the Yeshiva University campus radio station WYUR (Yeshiva University Radio), in 1981. At the university he acquired the initial skills and technical know-how to host a radio show. During his senior year at Yeshiva, Segal was approached by Norman Laster (Neshoma Show) through Mr. Larry Wachsman, the Director of Student Activities, and offered the opportunity to produce and host the Hebrew and Jewish Program at Upsala College's WFMU. (The departing host was Larry Gordon.)

== JM in the AM ==
Segal began hosting the program on WFMU in 1983. By 2014, he estimated that it had at least 55,000 listeners, including listeners outside the United States via the internet. Segal's presentation of music, news, and community events accompanied tens of thousands of listeners through their morning routine. Segal has served as Master of Ceremonies for the annual HASC A Time for Music concert.

Upsala College went out of business in 1995. However, station management had purchased the license from the college the previous year, and the station continued to function as an independent entity, moving from East Orange to Jersey City, New Jersey, in 1998. Segal's program was retained during this transitional period and remained in the 6-9 am block Monday through Friday.

Segal's advocacy for social causes and his longevity has propelled JM in the AM to be regarded as the radio program of record in the Jewish world. He is known for analyzing and probing issues from the perspective of the Jewish world. Influential members of the political world – from ambassadors to senators to chevrei Knesset – have sought time on the air and joined Segal in the studio. JM in the AM has been called the "Voice of Klal Yisrael (The Whole of Israel)".

In early 2013, Segal expanded the show's reach with the launch of the Nachum Segal Network. In addition to carrying JM in the AM live, his network contains an archive of the shows available on demand, as well as airing other Jewish and Israel themed shows.

On September 20, 2016, Segal announced that his last show on WFMU was on December 1, and that afterward the show was to be available exclusively via the Nachum Segal Network. Segal said that the majority of those listening to the show did not listen via terrestrial radio anymore, and those who did could access the show via the app, website, or a telephone listen line.

== Communal work ==
Segal has been at the forefront of numerous Jewish causes. During Operation Pillar of Defense in Israel and the aftermath of Hurricane Sandy on the East coast, Segal highlighted conversations with key people, analysts and organizations.

== Family ==
He is the son of late Esther and Rabbi Zev Segal.
