= David Hollander (rabbi) =

American Orthodox rabbi

Rabbi David B. Hollander

Personal life
- Born: Dovid Dov (David B) Hollander; 1913 Hungary
- Died: 2009 (aged 95–96) Brooklyn, New York
- Spouse: Fay Hollander
- Parents: Yonoson Binyomin Hollander (father); Rachel Hollander (mother)
- Education: Rabbi Isaac Elchanan Theological Seminary (RIETS)

Religious life
- Religion: Judaism
- Denomination: Orthodox Judaism
- Synagogue: Mount Eden Jewish Center (1943-1980) Hebrew Alliance of Brighton Beach
- Position: Rabbi
- Ended: 2009
- Other: Columnist: Jewish Press (English), Algemeiner Journal (Yiddish)
- Semikhah: RIETS

Rabbi David B. (Dovid Dov) Hollander (1913–2009) was an American Orthodox rabbi, and president of The Rabbinical Council of America from 1954 to 1956. At the time of his death, he was the longest serving active pulpit rabbi in the United States.

== Early life ==
David Hollander was born in Hungary in 1913 to Yonoson Binyomin (Jonathan Benjamin) and Rachel Hollander. Nine years later, Yonoson Binyomin accepted a rabbinical position in Upstate New York. The rest of the family soon followed, and together they moved to New York City shortly before David's Bar Mitzvah.

Hollander initially studied at Yeshiva Torah Vodaath. Years later he received his semikha (rabbinical ordination) and law degree from Yeshiva Rabbeinu Yitzchok Elchonon (RIETS) at Yeshiva University.

== Rabbinate ==
In 1943, Hollander was elected rabbi of Mount Eden Jewish Center in The Bronx, New York, and remained its rabbi until the synagogue disbanded in 1980. At the time, he had forfeited months of back-pay so that the building would not be sold to a church. In 2005, the building was demolished, and in the following year, a new apartment building was constructed in its place.

Hollander served as Vice President of the Rabbinical Council of America, a national assembly of Orthodox rabbis. In 1954, he was elected its president.

Hollander considered retiring when the Mount Eden Jewish Center closed. However, he was persuaded to continue in the rabbinate by the Lubavitcher Rebbe, who said to him, "I am older than you are, and I am taking on additional burdens. By what right do you retire?" With the help of Rabbi Paul M. Fleischman, he became the rabbi of the Hebrew Alliance of Brighton Beach synagogue at 2915 Brighton 6th Street, in Brighton Beach, Brooklyn.

In 2003, Hollander became the oldest active pulpit rabbi in the United States, and continued in that capacity until his death six years later.

Hollander was a columnist for many decades, writing both in Yiddish in the Algemeiner Journal, and in English in The Jewish Press. He was an oft-quoted speaker, and could be sometimes controversial.

== Soviet Jewry ==
In 1956, Hollander made his first visit to the Soviet Union. He brought along hundreds of prayer books, and encouraged the Jews living under Soviet persecution to keep their faith. He subsequently made five more visits to Russia.

He was a regular speaker at Soviet Jewry rallies. Following a merger in the 1990s of the Hebrew Alliance of Brighton Beach with Friends of Refugees of Eastern Europe (F.R.E.E), the majority of his congregants were from FSU (Former Soviet Union) countries.

== Family ==
Hollander's father-in-law was Shimshon Zelig Fortman, a Lithuanian rabbi who led the White Shul in Far Rockaway, Queens. His wife Fay, who had typed her husband's handwritten English and Yiddish columns, died a year after him. Although married 61 years, sadly the couple did not have any children

Hollander was survived by a brother in Israel. Rabbi Moshe Sherer was his brother-in-law.

== See also ==
- Abraham Hecht
