= Yochi Dreazen =

American journalist

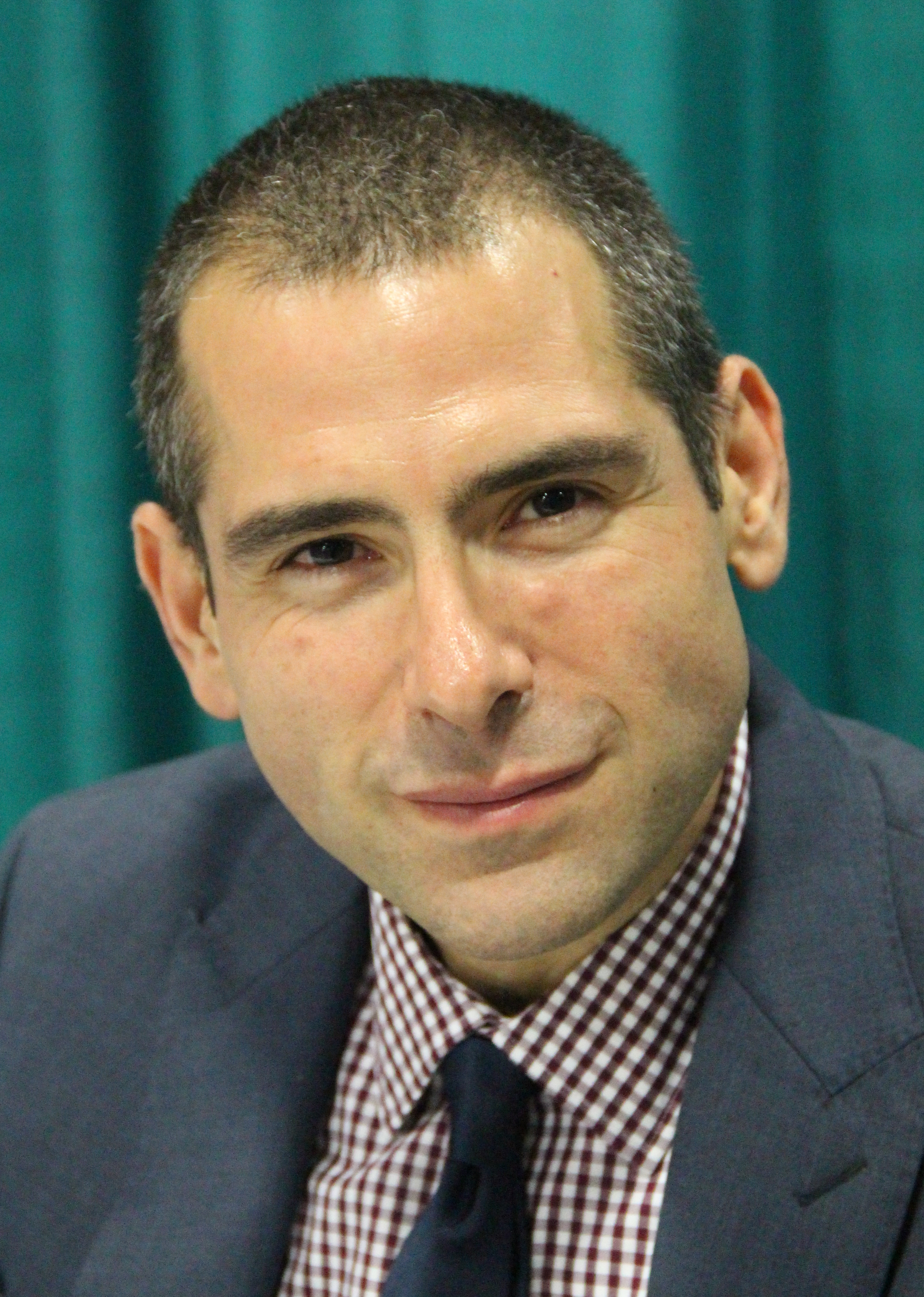
- at the 2015 National Book Festival
- Born: Chicago
- Education: Ida Crown Jewish Academy; University of Pennsylvania
- Occupation: Journalist
- Spouse: Annie Rosenzweig
- Writing career
- Genre: non-fiction
- Website: yochidreazen.com

Yochi J. Dreazen (born c. 1976) is an American journalist whose area of expertise is military affairs and national security. As of 2016, he is the deputy managing editor and foreign editor of Vox and the author of a book, The Invisible Front: Love and Loss in an Era of Endless War, which details the story of one Army family's fight against military suicide. In the past he has been a reporter for The Wall Street Journal and National Journal and managing editor for news at Foreign Policy.

He is a frequent guest on radio and television programs, including The Diane Rehm Show (NPR) and Washington Week with Gwen Ifill (PBS).

== Life ==
Dreazen was born in Chicago, Illinois in 1976. In 1994, he graduated from the Ida Crown Jewish Academy, where he started a student newspaper. He spent a year in Israel before attending college. He graduated magna cum laude from the University of Pennsylvania in 1999, with degrees in history and English. As a student at the University of Pennsylvania, Dreazen edited the independent student newspaper, The Daily Pennsylvanian.

Dreazen's first employer was The Wall Street Journal. He arrived in Iraq in April 2003, less than a month after the start of the Iraq War, with the 4th Infantry Division; he lived in Baghdad for the next two and a half years, where he was The Wall Street Journal's main Iraq correspondent.

In total, Dreazen spent more than five years in Iraq and Afghanistan during the 11 years he worked at The Wall Street Journal. He has reported from more than three dozen countries, including China, Japan, Morocco, Pakistan, Russia, Saudi Arabia, and Turkey.

In 2010, the Military Reporters & Editors Association recognized Dreazen's work with its top award for domestic coverage. His work included articles about suicide among soldiers and the psychological traumas that affect veterans of the wars in Iraq and Afghanistan.

His book, The Invisible Front, was the finalist for the J. Anthony Lukas Work-in-Progress Award, jointly awarded by the Columbia University Graduate School of Journalism and Harvard's Nieman Foundation for Journalism. In the award citation, the judges cited the book's "detailed compassionate and compelling report from the front lines of what Dreazen calls 'the Army's third war' – its fight against the plague of military suicides in the wake of our prolonged conflicts in Iraq and Afghanistan." The book was also named one of "100 Notable Books of 2014" by The New York Times Book Review and one of Amazon.com's "10 Best Books of the Month"

Dreazen lives in Washington, D.C., with his wife Annie Rosenzweig, and their two children.

== Works ==
- The Invisible Front: Love and Loss in an Era of Endless War. Crown Publishers. 2014. ISBN 978-0-385-34783-9.
