= Yosef Adler =

American rabbi

Rabbi Yosef Adler was a Modern Orthodox rabbi based in Teaneck, New Jersey. He was the spiritual leader of the Rinat Yisrael synagogue and is the dean (or Rosh Yeshiva) of the Torah Academy of Bergen County. He studied under Rabbi Joseph Ber Soloveitchik at Yeshiva University.

Adler previously taught at Hillel Yeshiva, the Frisch School and ran the Advanced Talmud Department at the Ramaz School.

He was member and the former president of the Rabbinical Council of Bergen County. He was also a member of the Orthodox Roundtable.
