= Seth Mandel =

American journalist

Seth A. Mandel
- Born: 1982 (age 43–44); Lakewood, New Jersey, U.S.
- Education: Rutgers University (BA)
- Occupations: Columnist, editor, pundit
- Spouse: Bethany Mandel
- Children: 6

Seth A. Mandel (born 1982) is an American Jewish author and editor who has served as senior editor for Commentary magazine. He previously worked as executive editor of the Washington Examiner print edition between 2018 and 2023 and as the op-ed editor of the New York Post. Mandel has been described as an American conservative aligned with the Never Trump movement.

== Early life and education ==
Mandel attended (the now-defunct) Moshe Aaron Yeshiva High School in South River, New Jersey, then graduated from Rutgers University in 2004 with a degree in journalism and media studies.

== Career ==
Upon graduation from Rutgers, Mandel began working as a newspaper reporter for the East Brunswick Sentinel. Two years later, he was offered reporting jobs at four related newspapers: The Jewish State, The Jewish Journal, The Speaker, and Jewish Life of Hudson County. By the time these newspapers folded in July 2010, he was managing editor of all four. In 2011, he moved to Washington, D.C., and became a National Security Fellow at the Foundation for Defense of Democracies, a national security and foreign policy think tank, and a journalism fellow at the David Horowitz Freedom Center, formerly known as the Center for the Study of Popular Culture. A year later, he returned to the New York area as assistant editor of Commentary magazine. He then became op-ed editor of the New York Post.

He has written for the New York Post, The Atlantic, RealClearPolitics, and Commentary magazine. In 2017, The New York Times named him one of three writers "From the Right" recommended to their readers," while Paste Magazine named him one of "The 25 Best Never Trump Conservatives to Follow on Twitter." He has also been interviewed on NPR as a prominent "Never Trump" conservative.

In 2013, several media outlets reported he was among a group of American conservative writers indirectly paid by the Malaysian government for writing articles critical of the Malaysian opposition leadership (Mandel received $5,500), and had not disclosed this payment at the time his writing was published.

In October 2018, he was named executive editor of The Washington Examiner print edition.

== Personal life ==
Mandel married Bethany Mandel in 2011; the couple have six children. In 2017, he helped his wife deliver their third child in a Nissan Altima, while en route to the hospital from their home in Highland Park, New Jersey. Mandel met his wife Bethany through friends she made at Rutgers University Hillel. Bethany converted to Orthodox Judaism in 2011.

Mandel is an Orthodox Jew.
