= Jeff Seidel =

American Jewish outreach

- Born: Jeffrey Seidel; 1957 (age 68–69); Chicago, Illinois
- Occupation: Jewish outreach
- Years active: 1982–present
- Organization: Jewish Student Information Center
- Notable work: The Jewish Traveler's Resource Guide
- Website: jeffseidel.com

Jeffrey "Jeff" Seidel (born 1957) is an American-Israeli Orthodox Jewish outreach (kiruv) worker based in Jerusalem. Since 1982, his organization, the Jewish Student Information Centers, has provided Shabbat hospitality, tours, and classes to Jewish college students in Jerusalem, Tel Aviv, Beersheba, and Herzliya. He also compiled The Jewish Traveler's Resource Guide, which lists Shabbat placement programs around the world.

== Early life and education ==
Jeffrey Seidel was born in Chicago, Illinois. He attended public school and then graduated from the Ida Crown Jewish Academy in 1975. He decided to leave university in the middle of studying for his doctorate in psychology to move to Israel in 1981.

== Outreach career ==
Following the expansion of the baal teshuva movement in Israel during the 1970s, Orthodox outreach workers began organizing programs at the Western Wall to invite English-speaking students and travelers to Shabbat meals with host families and tours of the Old City. These outreach workers included Rabbi Meir Schuster, Baruch Levine, and, beginning in 1982, Jeff Seidel. Seidel initially arranged Shabbat meals for approximately 15 people per week, which expanded to an average of 100 to 150 people per week after coordinating with a larger network of local host families. He also arranges accommodations for visiting yeshiva students, conducts walking tours of the Jewish Quarter, and directs students to baal teshuva yeshivas.

Seidel founded the Jewish Student Information Center in Jerusalem's Old City in 1986. The Center offered free walking tours in the Jewish Quarter, archaeological tours, and religious and holiday classes. Seidel also compiled The Jewish Traveler's Resource Guide, which lists similar Shabbat placement programs around the world. Dana Evan Kaplan wrote that the guide served as an effective tool for drawing participants to the baal teshuva movement.

Seidel established a second Jewish Student Information Center near the Hebrew University of Jerusalem in 1992, offering hospitality services, student amenities, and lectures. He opened a center near Tel Aviv University in 1994, and subsequently opened centers at Ben Gurion University in Beersheba and the Interdisciplinary Center Herzliya.

The Jeff Seidel Jewish Student Information Center offers $400 scholarships toward airfare for former Birthright participants and Hillel alumni who wish to study in Israel. He also runs an online Worldwide Passover Hospitality project which pairs up students and young tourists with host families around the world for the Passover Seder, and arranges meals for 200 to 300 travelers in Israel and around the world between Rosh Hashana and Sukkot.

As of 2017, Seidel publishes a weekly op-ed on the Israeli-based news website The Times of Israel. His topics include Jewish continuity, Jewish outreach, current events, and anti-Semitism on college campuses.

== Personal life ==
Seidel married Penina Greene, daughter of scientist, academic, and Chabad baal teshuva Professor Velvl Greene. She is an oncology nurse at the Hadassah Medical Center on Mount Scopus. They live in the Jewish Quarter of the Old City in Jerusalem.

In December 2014, Seidel's car was stoned by a crowd of youths while he was driving toward the Mount of Olives Jewish Cemetery. His car sustained 4,000 shekels' ($1,000) worth of damage, but he was uninjured. One of his passengers was treated for a scratched cornea caused by splintered glass.

== See also ==
- Orthodox Judaism outreach
- Baal teshuva
