= Ziv Maor =

Israeli lawyer and media personality

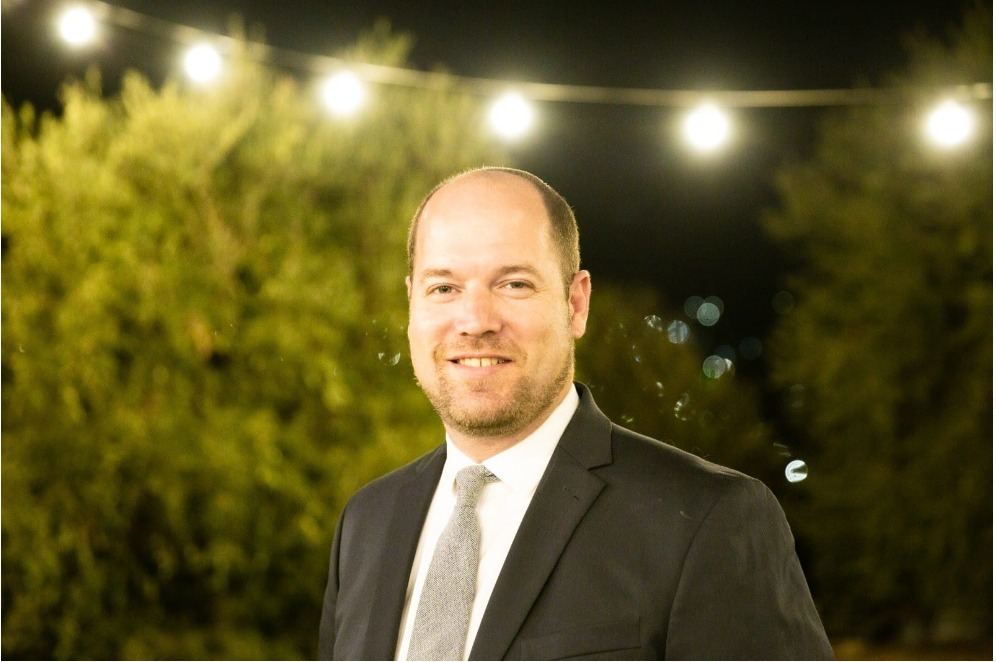
- Attorney Ziv Maor, 2021
- Born: February 18, 1984 (age 42); Israel
- Occupations: Publicist, Radio broadcaster
- Employer(s): TheMarker, Mida, Radio Galei Israel, Israel's Media Watch

Ziv Maor (זיו מאור; born 18 February 1984) is an Israeli lawyer and media personality. He is the founder and editor-in-chief of the news editions at Radio Galei Israel, where he also serves as host and news anchor. He is a host and interviewer on TOV Channel, and a columnist in various platforms.

He previously served as parliamentary assistant to MKs Michael Eitan and Uri Ariel, spokesman for the Chief Rabbinate of Israel, and CEO of Israel's Media Watch.

== Biography ==
Maor was born into a religious Zionist family. When he was three, his family moved to the moshav Hemed. Until 10th grade he studied at Nehalim Yeshiva, and in 11th grade transferred to Kinor David Yeshiva.

He founded the local branch of Bnei Akiva in Beit Dagan, where he served as youth counselor while still in high school.

He was drafted into Galei Tzahal (Army Radio) but was dismissed from the station after completing the course. He continued his service as editor of "Makhatz", the bulletin of the commanders of the Infantry Corps and Paratroopers Brigade.

=== Education ===
Maor holds a Bachelor's degree in Management and Political Science from the Open University of Israel, a Bachelor of Laws from Sha'arei Mishpat College, and a Master's degree in Jewish History, focusing on American Jewry, from the University of Haifa as part of the Ruderman Program.

He is a graduate of the Statesmanship Program at Shalem Center, the Young Leadership Forum of the Institute for Zionist Strategies, and a seminar of the Tikvah Fund. Since 2009, he has been a member of the ROI Community of the Schusterman Foundation.

=== Public career ===
During the 17th Knesset, Maor was spokesman for MK Michael Eitan, and later became head of desk and Wall Street correspondent at TheMarker.

Between 2010 and 2012, during the 18th Knesset, he served as parliamentary assistant to MK Uri Ariel, and in December 2012 was appointed spokesman of the Chief Rabbinate of Israel.

From March 2015 to April 2016 he was a researcher at the Kohelet Policy Forum, and authored a position paper on film funding policy by the Ministry of Culture and Sport (Israel). Some of its recommendations were adopted in the 2018 amendment to the Film Law.

=== CEO of Israel's Media Watch ===
In May 2016, Maor was appointed CEO of Israel's Media Watch. In this role he promoted the position advocating closure of all public broadcasting bodies in Israel – the Israeli Public Broadcasting Corporation, Galei Tzahal and Knesset Channel – arguing that public broadcasting harms the free market. He also argued that state regulation of broadcast content by the Second Authority for Television and Radio and the Council for Cable and Satellite Broadcasting damages freedom of expression and artificially preserves the dominance of supervised media outlets, particularly Keshet 12 and Reshet 13.

During this period he supported the 44th amendment to the Second Authority for Television and Radio Law, which removed Channel 14’s special status (then named Channel 20) as a heritage channel and curtailed the Second Authority's supervisory powers.

=== Further public activity ===
In July 2017 he was appointed editor of Mida, replacing Akiva Bigman. He was involved in publishing allegations of irregularities in cooperation between the Civil Service Commission and the Wexner Foundation, as well as biases by the Government Advertising Bureau in favor of "Haaretz" and against "Israel Hayom" in distribution of advertising budgets.

From 2019 to 2021 he was an attorney in Eran Ben-Ari’s office and legal adviser to the Im Tirtzu movement alongside Ben-Ari. Later, he became legal adviser to Radio Galei Israel.

Maor is also active in the organization National Vision where he lectures in its public leadership program.

=== In the media ===
Maor publishes opinion pieces in Mida, Globes, Srugim, Arutz Sheva, and frequently appears as a commentator on Channel 14.

Since 2017 he has hosted programs on Radio Galei Israel. In August 2021 he began a weekly legal program called "The Hammer". He also co-hosts shows such as "Nerve Center", "Wake Up with Ziv Maor", and the station’s midday news journal.

In July 2022 he joined the permanent team of presenters on TOV Channel, and he is the founder and editor-in-chief of the Radio Galei Israel news edition, launched in October 2022, which he also often anchors.

In July 2023 he was appointed member of the Council for Cable TV and Satellite Broadcasting.

=== Cultural activity ===
Between 2013 and 2016, Maor was a member of the Jerusalem a cappella choir "Kolot Cher Shuk". From 2019 to 2022 he acted in the play "The New Ghetto" by Theodor Herzl, directed by Prof. Yehuda Moraly, and in an adaptation of Baron Munchausen by Yitzhak Laor, directed by Asaf Friedman.

== Personal life ==
Ziv Maor is married to Yael, daughter of Avi Rat and sister of Rabbi Moshe Rat. They have four children. The family lived in Tekoa, Gush Etzion, and later moved to Jerusalem, where they reside as of 2025.
