= Mark Dratch =

American rabbi

Rabbi Mark Dratch

Executive vice president of the Rabbinical Council of America
- In office 2012–2024

Founder of JSafe

Personal details
- Spouse: Rachel Levitt Klein (m. 2017)
- Education: Yeshiva University
- Alma mater: Yeshiva College (1979); RIETS (rabbinic ordination, 1982); Ferkauf Graduate School (Jewish Education, 1982); MSW, Wurzweiler School of Social Work (2012)
- Occupation: Rabbi, advocate
- Known for: Founding JSafe, advocacy against domestic violence and abuse in the Jewish community

Mark Dratch served as the executive vice president of the Rabbinical Council of America from 2012 to 2024. He is the founder of JSafe (the Jewish Institute Supporting an Abuse-Free Environment). In 2010, he was named as one of Newsweek's "Top 50 Rabbis in America". He was number 13 on Newsweek's list in 2013.

Since 2023, Dratch has served as chair of the International Jewish Committee for Interreligious Consultations, an umbrella group of major Jewish organizations which represents world Jewry in dialogue with the Vatican, the World Evangelical Alliance, the World Council of Churches, and the Eastern Orthodox Patriarchate.

== Education ==
Dratch is a graduate of Yeshiva University (Yeshiva College, 1979; RIETS (rabbinic ordination), 1982; Ferkauf Graduate School (Jewish Education), 1982), and received an MSW from Wurzweiler School of Social Work (2012).

== Positions ==
Dratch served as a congregational rabbi for 22 years. His congregations include Congregation Agudath Sholom, Stamford, Connecticut; Shaarei Shomayim Congregation, Toronto, Ontario; Congregation Kehilath Jeshurun, New York, New York; Boca Raton Synagogue, Boca Raton, Florida (Dratch was the founding rabbi); and Congregation Beth Israel, Schenectady, New York. He also served as the "Webbe Rebbe", answering "Ask the rabbi" questions addressed to the Orthodox Union on its website.

He was a vice president of the Rabbinical Council of America, served as chairman of its task force on rabbinic improprieties, and was responsible for spearheading and formulating policy guidelines for responding to allegations against member rabbis. He was a member of the RCA Executive Board and the Orthodox Caucus.

He was an instructor of Jewish Ethics and Philosophy at the Isaac Breuer College of Yeshiva University, and the camp rabbi of Camp Morasha.

In September 2012, Dratch was appointed as executive vice president of the Rabbinical Council of America.

== Publications ==
Dratch has published articles in English and Hebrew-language journals, on the interface between Jewish law and contemporary society. He wrote a series of articles on Jewish ethical issues for the Ethics Project of the Orthodox Caucus.

He edited Foundation of Faith: a Tapestry of Insights and Illuminations on Pirkei Avot, based on the thought and writings of Rabbi Norman Lamm (OU Press, 2021). His chapter, "A Community of Co-Enablers: Why Are Jews Ignoring Traditional Jewish Law by Protecting the Abuser?" appears in Tempest in the Temple: Jewish Communities and Child Sex Scandals, A. Neustein, ed. (Brandeis University Press, 2009) and his chapter "I Do? Consent and Coercion in Sexual Relations" appears in Rav Chesed: Essays in Honor of Rabbi Dr. Haskel Lookstein, R. Medoff, ed. (Ktav, 2009). His paper dealing with the Jewish views on domestic violence was originally distributed through the Rabbinical Council.

== Domestic violence and sexual abuse advocacy ==
In 2005, Dratch founded JSafe: The Jewish Institute Supporting an Abuse Free Environment. He served as its CEO until his appointment as executive vice president of the Rabbinical Council of America. Dratch was a member of the Clergy Task Force on Abuse of Jewish Women International, a member of the Leadership Time of the FaithTrust Institute, and a member of the editorial Bbard of the (now defunct) Journal of Religion and Abuse. He also lectures on matters of domestic violence, child abuse, and professional abuse in the Jewish community.

== Personal life ==
He was married to Sara Lamm (d. 2013), the daughter of Rabbi Norman Lamm, the long-time president and chancellor of Yeshiva University. In December 2017 he married Rachel Levitt Klein.
