= Shmuel Goldin =

American Jewish Rabbi

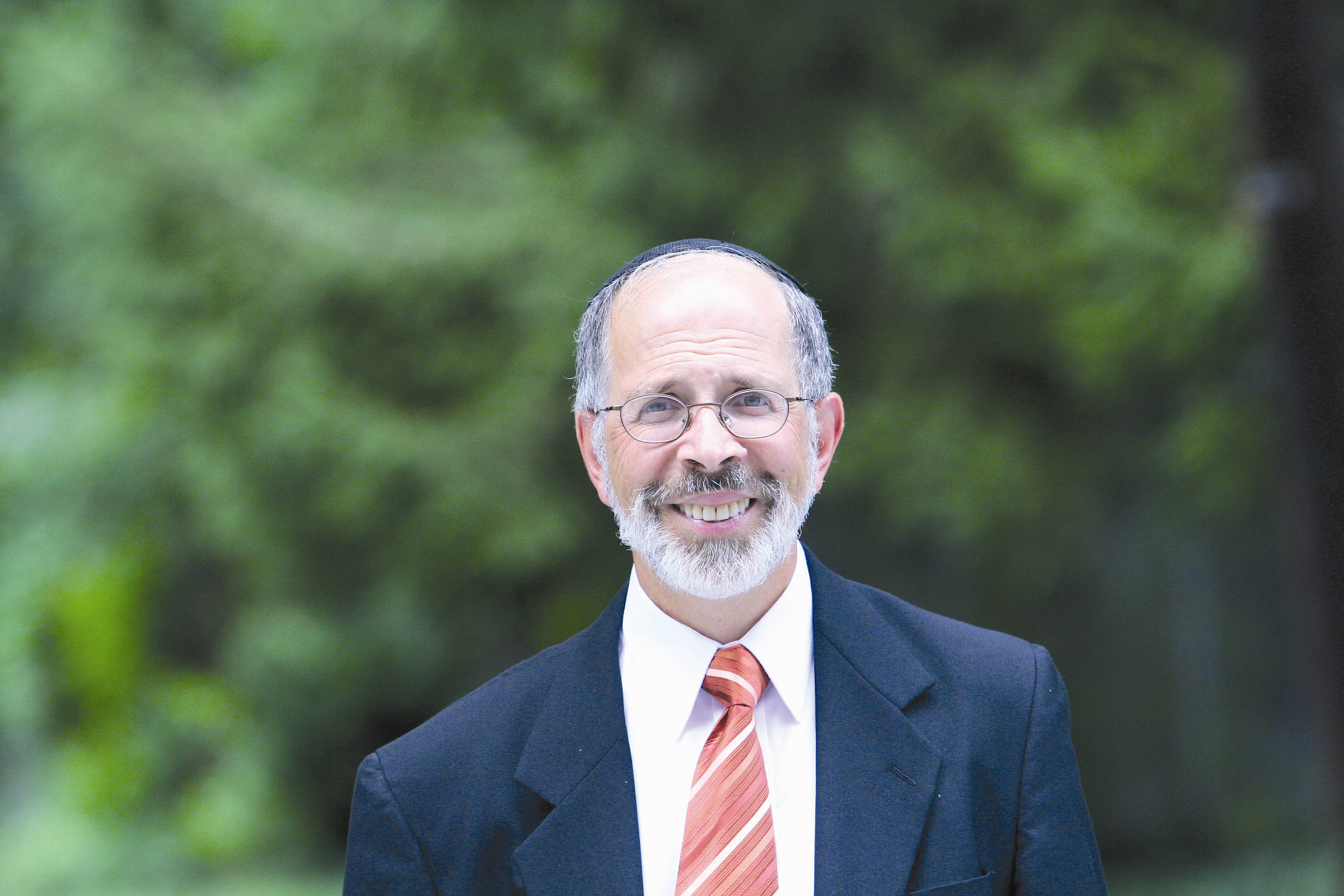
- Goldin in 2007
- Born: 1952 (age 73–74); Brooklyn, New York, U.S.
- Occupations: Rabbi; author
- Spouse: Barbara Goldin

Shmuel Goldin (born 1952) is a Modern Orthodox rabbi, scholar, and author. He served as senior rabbi of Congregation Ahavath Torah in Englewood, New Jersey, from 1984 until 2017, and was president of the Rabbinical Council of America (RCA) from May 2010 to July 2013.

== Early life and education ==
Goldin was born in the Borough Park neighborhood of Brooklyn and raised in West Hempstead, New York. He attended the Brooklyn Talmudic Academy and studied at Yeshiva University’s Isaac Elchanan Theological Seminary, where he received rabbinic ordination and earned a master’s degree in Jewish education.

== Career ==
In 1976, Goldin began his rabbinic career as Assistant Rabbi in Charge of Youth at Beth Jacob Congregation in Beverly Hills, California. Later that year, he became rabbi of Beth Sholom Congregation in Potomac, Maryland, serving there for six years. In 1984, he was appointed senior rabbi of Congregation Ahavath Torah, leading the synagogue for 33 years and expanding its educational and outreach programs. In April 2017, Ahavath Torah held a farewell tribute as Goldin and his wife prepared to relocate to Israel.

Goldin served as president of the Rabbinical Council of America from May 2010 until July 2013.

== Publications and scholarship ==
Goldin is the author of the multi-volume series Unlocking the Torah Text and of Unlocking the Haggadah (2019), a commentary on the Passover Haggadah combining translation, essays, and philosophical analysis. His Haggadah commentary was reviewed by Greer Fay Cashman in The Jerusalem Post in April 2019.

== Public positions ==
In July 2010, Goldin was among the signatories of a Rabbinical Council of America statement calling on Orthodox communities to welcome gay and lesbian Jews and their children as full members and to oppose conversion therapy.

Goldin’s reflections on making aliyah and life in Jerusalem were featured in a 2022 interview in The Jewish Link.

== Recognition ==
Goldin was selected as one of the “Forward 50” influential Jewish leaders in 2011 by The Forward.

== Personal life ==
Goldin and his wife, Barbara, have five children. They reside in Jerusalem following his aliyah in 2017.
