= Leonard Matanky =

American Orthodox rabbi (born 1958)

Leonard A. Matanky

Personal life
- Born: Leonard A. Matanky; October 26, 1958 (age 68) Chicago, Illinois
- Spouse: Margaret Matanky
- Children: 7
- Education: Hebrew Theological College (Ordination and MREd.), Loyola University (MEd), New York University (PhD)
- Occupation: Rabbi

Religious life
- Religion: Judaism
- Denomination: Modern Orthodox

Jewish leader
- Synagogue: Congregation K.I.N.S.
- Organization: Rabbinical Council of America
- Began: 2013
- Ended: 2015
- Residence: Chicago, Illinois
- Semikhah: Hebrew Theological College

Leonard A. Matanky (born October 26, 1958) is an Orthodox rabbi Based in Chicago, Illinois, Matanky is the rabbi of Congregation K.I.N.S of West Rogers Park. and Dean of Ida Crown Jewish Academy and past president of the Rabbinical Council of America and the Religious Zionists of America.

== Biography ==
Matanky was born in Chicago in 1958. In 1978 he wrote Shabbat Games - Games for Youth Groups, published as a joint venture between American Zionist Youth Foundation Inc. and Bnei Akiva. In 1981, he received rabbinical ordination and a master's degree in Religious Education from Hebrew Theological College. That year, he began teaching Judaic studies at Ida Crown Jewish Academy, a coeducational Modern Orthodox high school in Skokie, a suburb of Chicago, IL. Matanky subsequently earned a master's degree in Educational Administration from Loyola University in 1982, and a Ph.D. from the Graduate School of Arts and Sciences New York University in 1989. In 1994 he assumed the pulpit of Congregation K.I.N.S. in Chicago's West Rogers Park neighborhood. He was appointed Interim Principal of ICJA in 1996 and then Dean of the school (CEO) in 1999, where he continues to serve.

From 2013-2014, Rabbi Matanky was the president of the Rabbinical Council of America. From 2017 to 2023, Rabbi Matanky served as co-President of Religious Zionists of America/Mizrachi. Prior to that, he served two terms as president of the Chicago Rabbinical Council. Rabbi Matanky is on the boards of World Mizrachi, the Expanded Executive of the World Zionist Organization, the Religious Zionists of Chicago, and Camp Moshava. He was the co-Chairman of the Rabbinic Action Committee of the Jewish Federation of Metropolitan Chicago for more than a decade (until 2023) and serves on the rabbinic advisory committee of the YU Torah MiTzion Kollel of Chicago.

== Family ==
Matanky is married to Margaret Novick, with whom he has three sons and four daughters. His eldest child, Yaakov, died in a car accident in 2002 near Camp Moshava Wild Rose. The outdoor synagogue at the camp "Beit Yaakov Levi" was named in his memory.

== Recent Publications ==
Author, "Missions": The First 100 Days of the Gaza War" (2024)

Co-Editor, HaMadrikh: The RCA Lifecycle Guide (2023)

Contributor, Praying for the Defenders of Our Destiny: The Mi Sheberach for IDF Soldiers (2023) by Aviad Hacohen (Author), Menachem Butler (Editor)

Co-Author, “Ida Crown Jewish Academy’s 21st Century Campus” in Jewish Educational Leadership, Winter 2020

Editor, Koren Shiva House Siddur (2019)

Associate Editor, “Siddur Avodat HaLev” – the prayer book of the Rabbinical Council of America (2018)

Author, “To Represent and to Inspire: The Role of a Sheliaĥ Tzibbur,” in Ennoble and Enable: Essays in Honor of Richard M. Joel (2018)

== Sources ==
- "Administration: Head Administrators: Rabbi Dr. Leonard A. Matanky, Dean". Ida Crown Jewish Academy. Archived from the original on 2008-09-26.
- "Rabbi Leonard A. Matanky". Rabbinical Council of America. 2014.
- "New York - Rabbi Leonard Matanky Selected As New RCA Head". Vos Iz Neias?. 11 July 2013. Archived from the original on 15 July 2013.
