= Urim Publications =

Urim Publications, an independent publisher of Jewish interest books, is based in Jerusalem, with an outlet in Brooklyn, New York.

Established in 1997 by Tzvi Mauer and Moshe Heller, Urim publishes approximately fifteen books per year on various topics related to Jewish tradition.

Beside publishing works about women and Judaism, its books span a range of topics including Jewish religious thought and modern life, Jewish law, Bible commentary, Passover haggadahs, modern Jewish biographies and spirituality. Areas of interest also include the life and works of Rabbi Abraham Isaac Kook and Nehama Leibowitz.

== Awards ==
Dignity Beyond Death: The Jewish Preparation for Burial by Rochel U. Berman (2005)

- The Koret International Jewish Book Award in the category of Jewish Life & Living (2006)
- The National Jewish Book Award (runner-up) in the category of Contemporary Jewish Life & Practice (2005)

Second Chances: Transforming Bitterness to Hope and the Story of Ruth by Rabbi Levi Meier (2005)

- The National Jewish Book Award (runner-up) in the category of Contemporary Jewish Life & Practice (2005)
