= Rabbinical Council of America =

Orthodox Jewish Rabbinical Association

The Rabbinical Council of America (RCA) is an organization of Orthodox rabbis; it is affiliated with The Union of Orthodox Jewish Congregations of America, more commonly known as the Orthodox Union (OU). It is one of the two main professional rabbinical association within Modern Orthodox in the United States along with the International Rabbinic Fellowship. Many rabbis of the RCA are graduates of the Rabbi Isaac Elchanan Theological Seminary of Yeshiva University or otherwise identify with Modern Orthodox Judaism.

== History ==
The roots of the organization go back to 1923 when it was founded as the Rabbinical Council of the Union of Orthodox Jewish Congregations of America. Its purpose was to perpetuate and promote Orthodox Judaism in the United States.

Its members attempted on a number of occasions to merge with other Jewish groups, for the purpose of developing a unified traditional rabbinate for the American Jewish community. A number of attempts were made to join with groups, such as Agudat Israel, but all such attempts were rebuffed.

A merger took place in 1935 between the Rabbinical Council of the Union of Orthodox Jewish Congregations and another Orthodox rabbinical group, the Rabbinical Association of the Rabbi Isaac Elchanan Theological Seminary, a part of Yeshiva University. With this merger the combined group took the name Rabbinical Council of America (RCA). In 1942, the Hebrew Theological College alumni merged with the RCA. In later years, the RCA attempted to merge with another Orthodox rabbinical group, the Rabbinical Alliance of America, but this attempt failed. There was also a temporary adoption of the Orthodox Roundtable that was abandoned in 1991; RCA leadership tried to censor the group.

Most members of the Rabbinical Council of America are actively working as pulpit rabbis; a significant minority are working in Jewish education.

Rabbi Joseph B. Soloveitchik played an important role in the RCA until his death in 1993. For many years, the RCA was led by Rabbi Steven Dworkin, who served as executive vice-president until his death in January 2003. The RCA was then headed by Rabbi Basil Herring, who previously served as director of the Orthodox Forum. In September 2012 the RCA announced that Rabbi Herring was transitioning to the position of editor-in-chief of RCA Publications and that Rabbi Mark Dratch would take over as the new EVP. In 2023, Rabbi Menachem Penner was appointed Executive Vice President to replace Rabbi Dratch who had moved to Israel in July 2023.

In recent years, complaints have surfaced within the Orthodox Jewish community about a lack of leadership and direction by the RCA and that the RCA has failed to meet the challenges posed by recent changes within the Orthodox Jewish community.

It publishes an English quarterly journal, Tradition: A Journal of Orthodox Jewish Thought, which began in 1958, and a Hebrew journal, HaDarom, which began in 1957.

The RCA was, for many years, affiliated with two yeshivas in Israel—Yeshivat HaDarom and the Gan Yavneh Youth Village. It severed its relations with both in 2009, pleading economic difficulties.

In 2009, it issued a protest against a USCCB statement on interfaith dialogue that was critical of dual-covenant theology.

As of 2010, there were close to 1,000 ordained rabbis in the RCA, spread throughout 14 countries.

== Geirus Policies and Standards committee ==
In 2007, the RCA established a Geirus Policies and Standards (GPS) committee, to strive for uniform conversion procedures by its affiliated rabbis and local rabbinical courts across the United States.

The move was controversial, with some criticism that it would make conversion more difficult and intimidating, create onerous burdens for adopted children scheduled for conversion, and represented a capitulation to more conservative voices. Supporters of the GPS maintain that it would establish certainty for converts—particularly those looking to move to Israel and have their conversion recognized, create definite benchmarks, ensure observance of Jewish law by converts, and squelch past practices of questionable conversions that stemmed from situational pressure on individual rabbis.

Under the process created by the GPS, while individual rabbis mentor and educate potential converts, as was the case previously, a regional religious court (beth din) finalizes the conversion by examining the prospective convert and deciding whether to approving the application.

A week after the arrest of Rabbi Barry Freundel, a prominent Washington, D.C. area RCA member on charges of voyeurism at a mikvah, the RCA sought to contain damage from negative publicity. It announced on October 20, 2014 that it would now require the appointment of ombudswomen to protect the interests and handle concerns of women undergoing conversion to Judaism, a process which requires disrobing in a ritual bath. The council announced it would also create a commission to identify ways that abuses of converts during the conversion process could be prevented. The council noted that the commission will include female members. The crimes allegedly committed by Freundel sent shock waves through the American Jewish community and threatened to precipitate a crisis between the American and Israeli rabbinates. Initially, the spokesperson for the Chief Rabbinate of Israel, Ziv Maor, indicated that conversions Freundel had supervised would be reviewed, but after an emergency meeting the Rabbinate issued a statement that Freundel's conversions before his arrest would be viewed as valid. In December 2014 the RCA was added as a defendant in a lawsuit prompted by Freundel's alleged voyeurism. The lawsuit was filed by a student at Georgetown University's law school who initially identified Kesher Israel Congregation, the synagogue where Freundel served as rabbi, the mikvah, and the law school as defendants for permitting Freundel's alleged illegal activities to go unchecked. Two more lawsuits were filed by the end of 2014, alleging RCA was aware of irregular behavior on Freundel's part but failed to remove him from positions of authority. Rabbi Marc D. Angel, a critic of the RCA's new conversion system, claimed that if the allegations are true, they reinforce concerns about the concentration of conversion powers. "This is a bad example of the fears we have had all along," Angel told The Jewish Daily Forward. "If you concentrate too much power in few hands, then there is bound to be abuse, and this just confirms our deepest fears." In response to the lawsuits, RCA issued the following statement: "The RCA has conducted itself appropriately and is taking important steps to improve its conversion protocols. We will defend ourselves vigorously in this matter."

On October 22, 2018, a $14.25 million class action settlement was reached over claims connected to Freundel. The RCA, along with Kesher Israel, the National Capital Mikvah, and the Beth Din of America, were named as settling defendants.

== Controversy ==
Following the release of a resolution on gun usage and gun ownership in July 2014, a controversy arose where a group of 12 Orthodox rabbis—nine of them members of the RCA—issued a counterstatement disputing the resolution. Subsequent dialogue focused on the alleged narrowness or breadth of the RCA statement in condemning "gun violence" and the "critique of elements of American culture that valorize weaponry and violence” that focus exclusively on guns rather than non-firearm related violence in the United States, while the RCA maintained that the resolution was "not about particular laws and regulations but a critique of elements of American culture that valorize weaponry and violence. That is, it was a broader critique of American gun culture." The original resolution was passed by a plurality in a vote that included less than ten percent of RCA members participating.

== Position on women's ordination ==
In 2015, the RCA passed a resolution which states, "RCA members with positions in Orthodox institutions may not ordain women into the Orthodox rabbinate, regardless of the title used; or hire or ratify the hiring of a woman into a rabbinic position at an Orthodox institution; or allow a title implying rabbinic ordination to be used by a teacher of Limudei Kodesh in an Orthodox institution."

Rabbi Seth Farber, an RCA member, called the RCA's resolution a "PR stunt by the right-wing membership of the RCA in order to further deepen the dividing lines among orthodoxy," and said that he believed the RCA leadership did not support the resolution. Rabbi Avi Weiss and Rabbi Asher Lopatin resigned in protest of the RCA resolution.

== Presidents ==
=== Presidents ===
- Herbert S. Goldstein (1938–1940)
- Simcha Levy (1940–1942)
- Joseph Lookstein (1942–1944)
- William Drazin (1944–1946)
- Uri Miller (1946–1948)
- Israel Tabak (1948–1950)
- Samuel Berliant (1950–1952)
- Theodore L. Adams (1952–1954)
- David B. Hollander (1954–1956)
- Solomon J. Sharfman (1956–1958)
- Emanuel Rackman (1958–1960)
- Charles Weinberg (1960–1962)
- Abraham Avrutick (1962–1964)
- Israel Miller (1964–1966)
- Pesach Levovitz (1966–1968)
- Zev Segal (1968–1970)
- Bernard L. Berzon (1970–1972)
- Louis Bernstein (1972–1974)
- Fabian Schonfeld (1974–1976)
- Walter Wurzburger (1976–1978)
- Bernard Rosensweig (1978–1980)
- Sol Roth (1980–1982)
- Gilbert Klaperman (1982–1984)
- Louis Bernstein (1984–1986)
- Milton Polin (1986–1988)
- Max Schreier (1988–1990)
- Marc D. Angel (1990–1992)
- Moshe Gorelik (1992–1994)
- Louis Bernstein (1994–1995)
- Rafael G. Grossman (1995–1997)
- Jacob Rubenstein (1997–1999)
- Kenneth Hain (1999–2001)
- Heshie Billet (2001–2003)
- Kenneth Auman (2003–2005)
- Dale Polakoff (2005–2007)
- Shlomo Hochberg (2007–2009)
- Moshe Kletenik (2009–2011)
- Shmuel Goldin (2011–2013)
- Leonard Matanky (2013–2015)
- Shalom Baum (2015–2017)
- Elazar Muskin (2017–2019)
- Daniel Korobkin (2019–2021)
- Binyamin Blau (2021–2023)
- Zvi Engel (2023–2025)
- Etan Tokayer (2025-present)

=== President of Israel Regional ===
- Rabbi Raymond Apple (2015–present)

=== Executive Vice Presidents ===
- Israel Klavan (1950–1979)
- Binyamin Walfish (1979–1994)
- Steven Dworken (1994–2003)
- Basil Herring (2003–2011)
- Mark Dratch (2012–2024)
- Menachem Penner (2024–present)

== See also ==
- International Rabbinic Fellowship
- Modern Orthodox Judaism
- Orthodox Judaism
- Rabbi
