= Rosenzweig =

Rosenzweig, or Rosensweig is a German surname meaning "rose twig or branch". Notable people with the surname include:

- Adolf Rosenzweig (1850–1918), German rabbi and Biblical and Talmudic scholar
- Allan Rosencwaig, American physicist
- Avrum Rosensweig (born 1960), Canadian Jewish community leader and broadcaster
- Alyssa Rosenzweig, software developer
- Amy Rosenzweig, American biochemist
- Anne Rosenzweig, American retired chef
- Barney Rosenzweig (born 1937), American television producer
- Cynthia E. Rosenzweig, American scientist and climatologist
- Dan Rosensweig, American business executive
- Eitan Rosenzweig (2001–2023), Israeli artist
- Ester Yoelevna Rosentsveig (1900–1987), Soviet spy
- Ethan Rosenzweig, American university official, diplomat, and attorney
- Ferdinand von Rosenzweig, Austrian military officer
- Franz Rosenzweig (1887–1929), German philosopher
- Gerson Rosenzweig (1861–1914), writer and poet
- Harry Rosen (born 1931, originally Rosenzweig), Canadian menswear storefounder
- Helen Jonas-Rosenzweig (1925–2018), Polish-American Holocaust survivor
- Itamar Rosensweig, New York City Rabbi
- Jake Rosenzweig (born 1989), American racing driver
- James Benjamin Rosenzweig, American experimental plasma physicist
- Jeffery A. Rosensweig, business program director
- Joseph "Joe 'The Greaser'" Rosenzweig, American racketeer
- Luc Rosenzweig (1943-2018), French journalist
- Marco Rosenzweig (born 1996), German footballer
- Mark Rosenzweig (1922-2009), brain scientist
- Michael Rosensweig (born 1955), rabbi
- Michael Rosen, British poet and children's storyteller
- Michael Rosenzweig, American ecologist
- Nathalie Rozencwajg, Luxembourg-born architect
- Peggy Rosenzweig, American politician
- Rachel Zoe Rosenzweig, American fashion stylist
- Rosie Rosenzweig, American feminist scholar
- Roy Rosenzweig (1950–2007), American historian
- Saul Rosenzweig (1907–2004), American psychologist and therapist
- Scott Rosenzweig (born 1963), American politician
- Smadar Rosensweig, assistant professor of Judaic Studies
- Tal Rosenzweig (born 1967), Danish-Israeli artist, known as "Tal R"
- Viktor Rosenzweig (1914–1941), Croatian communist, poet and writer

== Other uses ==
- Buber-Rosenzweig-Medal, an annual prize for Christian-Jewish relations, named after Franz Rosenzweig
- Chaim Rosenzweig, a fictional character in the Left Behind novels
- The Sisters Rosensweig, a play by Wendy Wasserstein
