= Gedalya =

Gedalya or Gedalyah may refer to:

- Gedaliah or Gedalya, Jewish governor of Yehud province under Nebuchadnezzar II of Babylon
- Gedalya Gal (born 1933), Israeli farmer and former politician
- Gedalya Dov Schwartz (1925–2020), American-born Orthodox rabbi, author, and legal jurist
- Gedalya Schorr (1910–1979), American rabbi
- Gedalya Silverstone (1871–1944), American rabbi
- Gedalya Sofer, flight engineer of El Al Flight 1862 that crashed in 1992
- Fast of Gedalia (Tzom Gedalya), a minor Jewish fast day

== See also ==
- Gedaliah (name)
