= Zweig =

Origin
- Languages: German, Yiddish
- Meaning: twig, branch
- Region of origin: Germany, Poland, Czech Republic, Austria

Zweig (German for "twig" or "branch") is a German and Yiddish surname. A shortening of Rosenzweig ("Rose branch"). It is the surname of:

- Alan Zweig, Canadian documentary filmmaker
- Ann Strickler Zweig, American scientist
- Arnold Zweig (1887–1968), German writer and pacifist
- Esther Zweig (1906-1981), American author, composer and translator
- George Zweig (born 1937), American particle physicist and neurobiologist
- Martin Zweig (1942–2013), American stock investor and financial analyst
- Stefan Zweig (1881–1942), Austrian writer
- Stefan Jerzy Zweig (born 1941) Austrian (formerly Polish) author and camera operator, Holocaust survivor
- Stefanie Zweig (1932–2014), German writer
- Rabbi Yochanan Zweig (born 1942), American Rosh Yeshiva
- Wiebke Zweig (born 1982), German politician
- Zachi Zweig, birth name of Zachi Dvira, Israeli archaeologist
