= Antoni Gawryłkiewicz =

Polish farm laborer who protected Jewish refugees during the Holocaust (1922-2007)

Antoni Gawryłkiewicz (1922-2007) was a Polish farm laborer. He was awarded the title of Righteous among the Nations by Yad Vashem from Jerusalem in July 1999, for saving the lives of 16 Polish Jews during the Holocaust, between May 1942 and July 1944, at the time of the Nazi German occupation of Poland.

== Biography ==
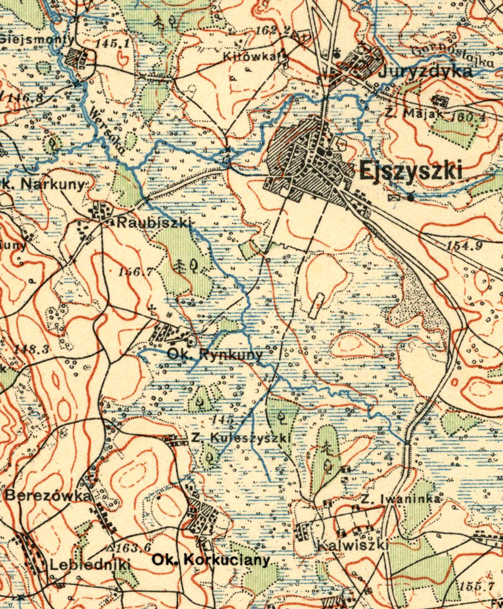
1926 map of the Korkuciany and Ejszyszki area in prewar Poland

During World War II, 18-year-old Gawryłkiewicz lived in the village of Korkuciany in Eastern Poland where he worked as laborer on a farm of Kazimierz Korkucz and his mother. In 1942 Kazimierz Korkucz was approached by a Jewish family-man Moshe Sonenson with a plea for help following the 1941 Ejszyszki massacre, which he escaped with his wife Zipporah, 10-year-old son Yitzhak and 6-year-old daughter Sonia (Scheinele). Their baby brother, Shaul, did not survive. Kazimierz Korkucz agreed to hide the Sonensons around his house as well as the other two families who came along: Kabaczniks and Solominanskys. Antoni Gawryłkiewicz, a shepherd employed by Korkucz, took it upon himself to do most of the caring. "To him," states Yitzhak Sonenson, "we all owe our lives," for he was the person most intimately involved with the care of the 16 Jews in hiding, including digging underground shelters, preparing food, removing bodily wastes, transfer from one locality to another, and no-less – warning them of approaching danger." Zipporah Sonenson, while in hiding, gave birth to her fourth child, Hayyim, in June 1944.

According to one account, at one point during the war Gawryłkiewicz's family was brutally interrogated by Lithuanian Nazi collaborators, who killed his father and brother, demanding information on hidden Jews. Antoni Gawryłkiewicz refused to give the refugees up. According to another account, quoting Gawryłkiewicz himself, his father and brother died after the war, in 1948, through he confirms they were killed by Lithuanians as a "revenge on friends of the Jews". After the war the village of Ejszyszki became annexed by the Soviet Union, and many local Poles were resettled west to Poland. Gawryłkiewicz moved to Płock in 1957 during the second repatriation. In 1999 he received the Righteous among the Nations recognition from Yad Vashem. He died in 2007.

== Conflicting accounts ==
The members of the Sonenson family, who survived the war thanks to Gawryłkiewicz and his employer as well as their numerous neighbors, emigrated to the United States. Sonia Sonenson became Professor Yaffa Eliach of New York's Brooklyn College. She collaborated with the United States Holocaust Memorial Museum in Washington, DC, and in 1998 published a book There Once Was A World, tracing the history of Jews from Ejszyszki. She also successfully appealed to Yad Vashem to grant its medal of honor to Antoni Gawryłkiewicz, which he received in 1999. However, in a 2000 interview Gawryłkiewicz disputed some details of Eliach's account, expressing surprise at some of the events she described, noting that he remembers them differently or considers them very unlikely.

In 2003, historian Marek Jan Chodakiewicz wrote that Eliach's rationale for the award for Gawryłkiewicz contained misleading inaccuracies; most notably the deposition stated erroneously that Gawryłkiewicz was severely beaten by the Polish underground for helping Jews, a story which Gawryłkiewicz never corroborated and that was not mentioned in his 2000 interview, in which he talked about numerous interrogations by Germans, and the brutal murder of his family members by Lithuanian collaborators. As of 2018, 15 years after Chodakiewicz pointed it out as a possible error, one of his two biographical entries at the Yad Vashem pages still contains the claim that "Antoni was apprehended by a Polish underground unit, and sustained severe beatings for refusing to disclose the presence of the hidden Jews", omitting any mention of the murder of his father and brother by Lithuanian collaborators, despite Antoni mentioning the loss of his two closest family members in his speech at Yad Vashem in 1999. (The other biography of the subject available at Yad Vashem states instead "One day, Gawryłkiewicz and Korkuć were arrested but, despite being brutally interrogated, did not betray their friends, and were released." without clarifying who carried out the arrest). Neither biography as of 2018 has been updated with the Gawryłkiewicz's date of death.
