= Michael Rosensweig =

American Rosh Yeshiva (born 1956)

Rabbi Dr. Michael Rosensweig
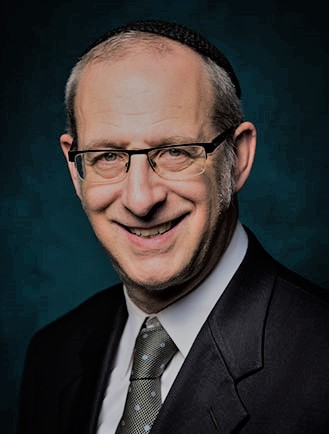
- Rosensweig in 2020

Personal life
- Born: December 22, 1956 (age 69)
- Spouse: Smadar Rosensweig
- Education: Yeshivat Har Etzion, Yeshiva University, Bernard Revel Graduate School

Religious life
- Religion: Judaism
- Denomination: Modern Orthodoxy

Jewish leader
- Position: Rosh Yeshiva
- Yeshiva: RIETS
- Residence: Kew Gardens, Queens
- Semikhah: Rabbi Isaac Elchanan Theological Seminary

Michael Rosensweig (born December 22, 1956) is an American Rosh Yeshiva at the Rabbi Isaac Elchanan Theological Seminary of Yeshiva University and the Rosh Kollel of the Beren Kollel Elyon.

== Biography ==
In 1973, at the young age of 16, Rabbi Rosensweig traveled to Israel to study under Rabbi Aharon Lichtenstein at Yeshivat Har Etzion for a year and a half. He then studied under Rabbi Joseph B. Soloveitchik at Yeshiva University for six years. He received his Semicha from the Rabbi Isaac Elchanan Theological Seminary and was a distinguished fellow at RIETS's post-semicha Gruss Kollel Elyon. He also studied with Rabbi Yaakov Bobrofksy, a disciple of Rabbi Baruch Ber Leibowitz, at Yeshiva High School of Queens.

Rosensweig graduated summa cum laude from Yeshiva College in 1980. He received his M.A. and Ph.D. in Medieval Jewish History from the Bernard Revel Graduate School of Jewish Studies, where he was mentored by Haym Soloveitchik, for whom he wrote both his M.A. thesis and doctoral dissertation. His dissertation is titled Debt Collection in Absentia: Halakhah in a Mobile and Commercial Age. Rosensweig is one of the only doctoral students mentored by Soloveitchik.

== Talmudic Methodology ==
Inspired by his teachers Rabbi Soloveitchik and Rabbi Lichtenstein, Rabbi Rosensweig employs a unique expanded form of the conceptual Brisker methodology in explaining Talmudic topics, with intense focus on the opinions of Rambam. To develop a broader and more nuanced perspective on issues and the topic as a whole, Rabbi Rosensweig meticulously presents the varying approaches of the Rishonim and Acharonim on the sugya, highlighting their underlying conceptual assumptions as well as pointing to consistencies in their views in other areas. He also seeks to accentuate the broader Torah values expressed by Halachic institutions.

== Appointment as Rosh Yeshiva and Rosh Kollel ==
In 1985, Rosensweig was appointed Rosh Yeshiva at RIETS, where he currently holds the Nathan and Perel Schupf Chair of Talmud. In 1997, he was appointed Rosh Kollel of the prestigious Beren Institute for Advanced Talmudic Studies (Beren Kollel Elyon) at RIETS.

In 2013, Rosensweig was invited to become the Rosh HaYeshiva at Yeshivat Kerem B'Yavneh in Israel, which he declined.

== Personal life ==
His father was Rabbi Dr. Bernard (Berel) Rosensweig (1926–2021), a professor of Jewish History at Yeshiva University. He was a student of Rabbi Joseph B. Soloveitchik and Rabbi Avraham Aharon Price.

He is the great-grandson of Rabbi Yehudah Yudel Rosenberg (1860–1935) on his mother's side.

In 1983, Rabbi Rosensweig married Smadar Rosensweig, a current professor at Yeshiva University's Stern College. She is a daughter of David and Yaffa Eliach.

Rav Rosensweig resides in Kew Gardens, Queens, with his wife, Smadar. They have seven children.

His son, Rabbi Itamar Rosensweig, is a maggid shiur at RIETS and a dayan on the Beth Din of America.

== Works ==
=== Books ===
- Mimini Mikhael - Essays on Yom Kippur and Teshuvah

=== English articles ===
- Personal Initiative and Creativity in Avodat Hashem (1989)
- Elu Va-Elu Divre Elokim Hayyim: Halakhic Pluralism and Theories of Controversy (1992)
- Reflections on the Conceptual Approach to Talmud Torah (2006)
- Family Structure: Halakhic and Anthropological Perspectives (2010)

=== Hebrew articles ===
- שיטת הרמב"ם בעניין ברכת חתנים (2003)
- שיטת הרמב"ם בעניין מנחת חביתין (2008)
- בעניין טיבו של איסור ריבית דאורייתא: הקדמה לפרק איזהו נשך (2016)

== Notable students ==
- Assaf Bednarsh
- Ari Berman
- Daniel Fridman
- Itamar Rosensweig
- Elliot Schrier
- Rabbi Reuven Taragin
- Rabbi Yosef Bronstein
