= Kesher Israel (Washington, D.C.) =

Modern Orthodox synagogue in Washington, D.C.

- Hebrew: קשר ישראל
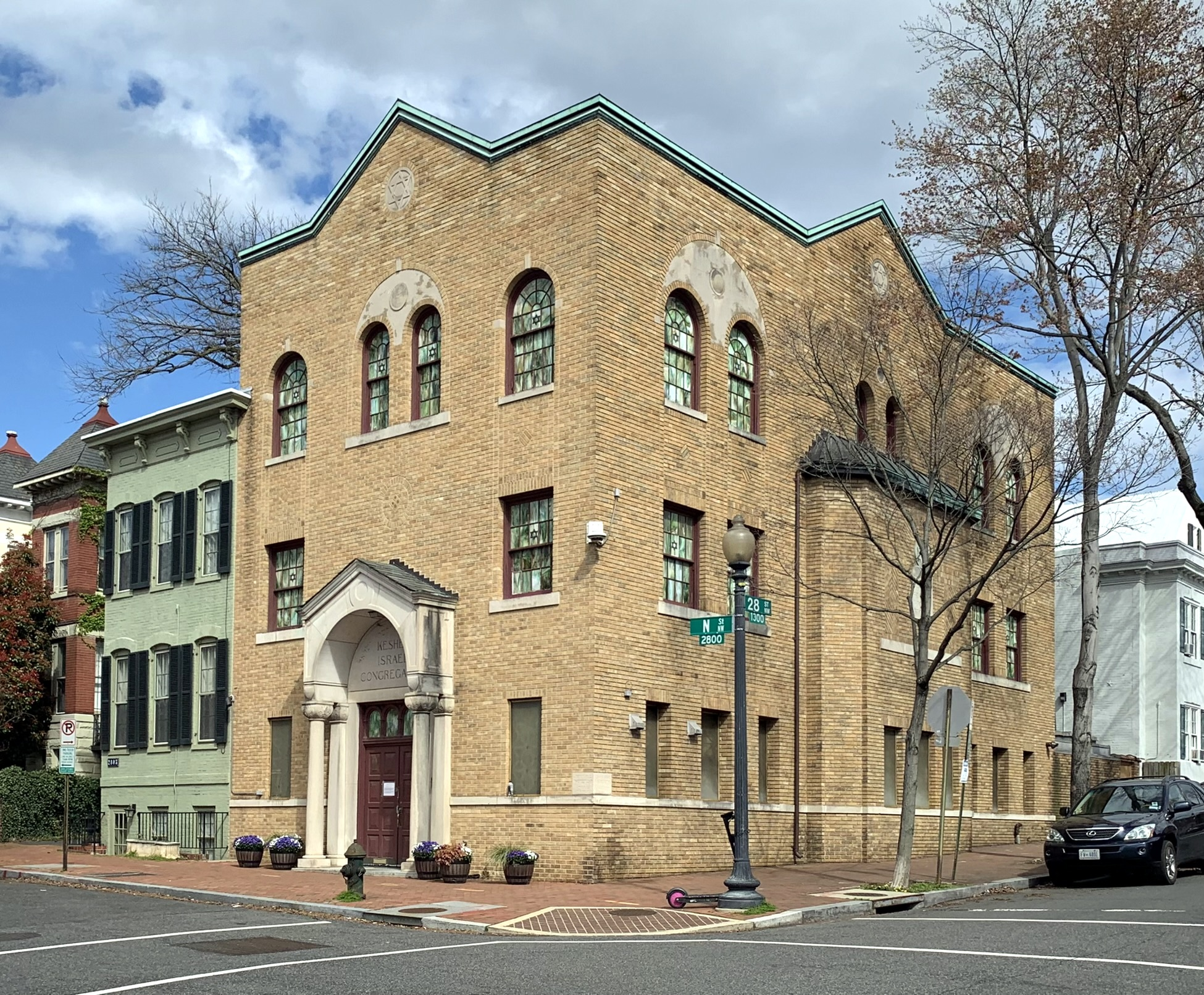
- Kesher Israel in 2022

- Location in Washington, D.C.

Religion
- Affiliation: Modern Orthodox Judaism
- Ecclesiastical or organisational status: Synagogue
- Leadership: Rabbi Hyim Shafner
- Status: Active

Location
- Location: 2801 N Street, Georgetown Historic District, NW Washington, D.C.
- Country: United States
- Coordinates: 38°54′25″N 77°3′25″W

Architecture
- Architect: Julius Wenig
- Type: Synagogue
- Style: Spanish Colonial Revival
- Established: 1911 (as a congregation)
- Completed: 1931

Website
- kesher.org
- Kesher Israel
- U.S. National Historic Landmark District – Contributing property
- D.C. Inventory of Historic Sites
- Part of: Georgetown Historic District (ID67000025)

Significant dates
- Designated NHLDCP: May 28, 1967
- Designated DCIHS: November 8, 1964

Kesher Israel (Hebrew: קשר ישראל, lit. 'Kinship of Israel'), also known as the Georgetown Synagogue, is a Modern Orthodox synagogue located in the Georgetown neighborhood of Washington, D.C. The congregation was founded in 1911 and its worshipers have included prominent politicians, diplomats, jurists, journalists, and authors.

== History ==
In 1910, six local Jewish merchants organized the Georgetown Hebrew Benevolent Society, which began to conduct religious services above a storefront on M Street, NW. A year later, this kernel, now numbering 50 families, founded Kesher Israel Congregation, which thus became the seventh synagogue organized in the nation's capital. In 1915, the congregation acquired, renovated, and began to meet in a premises at 2801 N Street, NW. The current synagogue building, which was constructed in 1931 on that site with a construction budget of $28,000, is a contributing property to the Georgetown Historic District, a National Historic Landmark, listed on the National Register of Historic Places.

The synagogue also administers two congregational cemeteries, one in Anacostia and the other in Capitol Heights, Maryland.

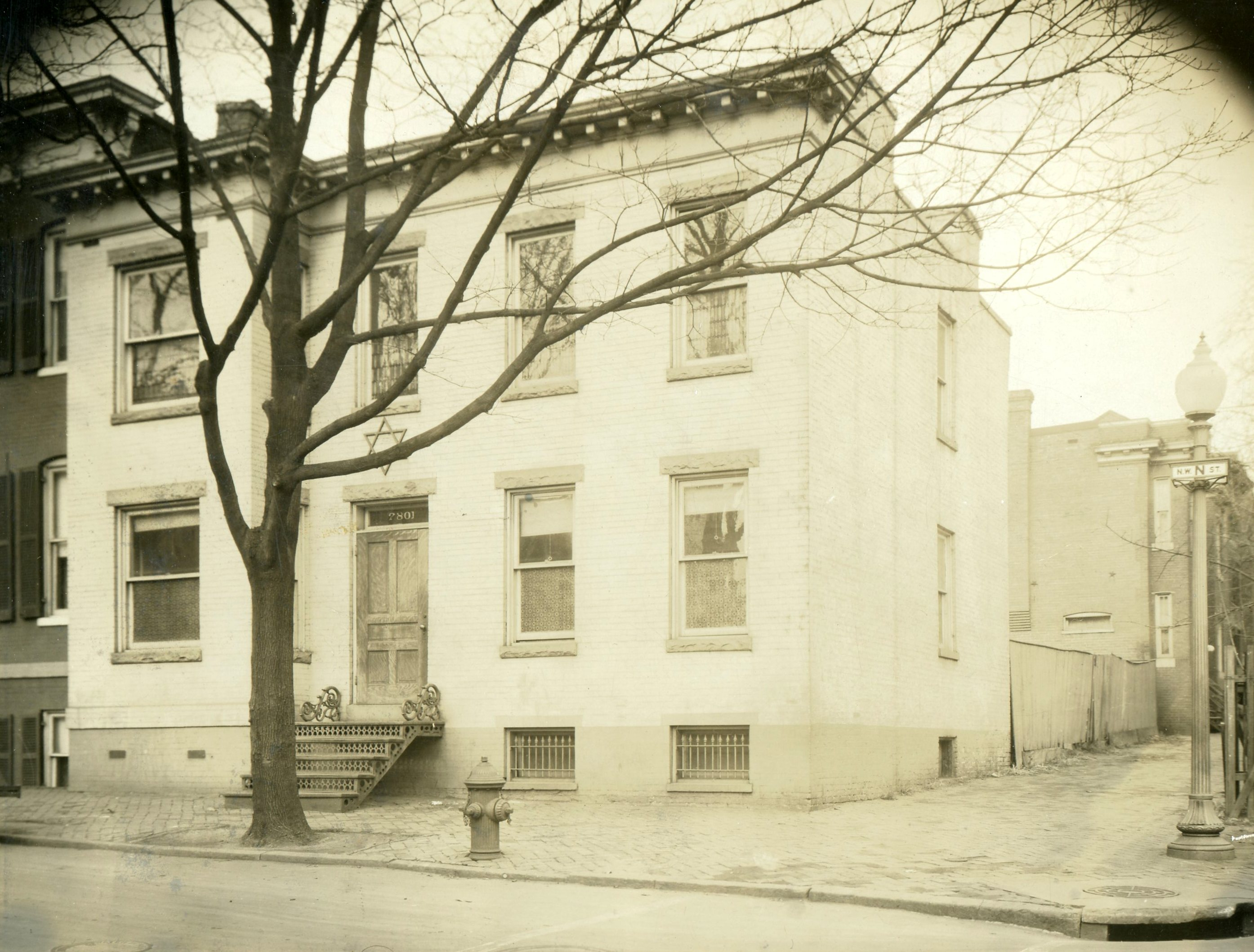
Kesher Israel's first building, in use between 1915 and 1931

Kesher Israel is the last of the city's original pre-war Orthodox synagogues located in walking distance of downtown Washington. Beginning in the 1950s, as the local Jewish community grew exponentially, all the others relocated uptown or to suburban Montgomery County, Maryland. This demographic trend, coupled with the passing of the founding generation, reduced Kesher Israel's membership in the 1960s to the point where it was difficult to ensure a daily minyan. The synagogue, however, experienced a renaissance beginning in the late 1970s, spurred by young urban professionals who were moving to Georgetown and nearby neighborhoods, including the West End, Foggy Bottom, Dupont Circle, Burleith, and even those further afield like Adams-Morgan, Kalorama and Rosslyn, across Key Bridge in Arlington County, Virginia. As of 2016, its membership was approximately 250 families and singles. Kesher Israel also attracts many students enrolled at nearby Georgetown University and George Washington University.

Following the signing of the Camp David Accords in September 1978, members of the Israeli delegation to the subsequent Blair House negotiations, including Foreign Minister Moshe Dayan and Defense Minister Ezer Weizman, attended Kol Nidre services at the synagogue.

Kesher Israel attracted national media attention during the 2000 U.S. presidential election when a member, Senator Joseph Lieberman, was selected as the Democratic nominee for Vice President of the United States. When the Senate scheduled important votes on Shabbat, Lieberman walked nearly 3 miles (5 km) from the synagogue to the United States Capitol, a trek he made over 25 times during his Senate career.

Author Herman Wouk, who joined Kesher Israel upon relocating to Washington when he began to research his novels of World War II, called it "the best little shul in America" and "a haven of true Yiddishkeit at the center of the finest neighborhood in Washington." It was due to his long association with the community that Kesher Israel was commonly known in Washington as "Herman Wouk's synagogue." Wouk recalled Kesher Israel one last time in his final book and memoir, Sailor and Fiddler: Reflections of a 100-Year-Old Author (2015), stating that “The little old synagogue at one end of N Street was our kind of shul.”

== Rabbinic leadership ==
=== Early years ===
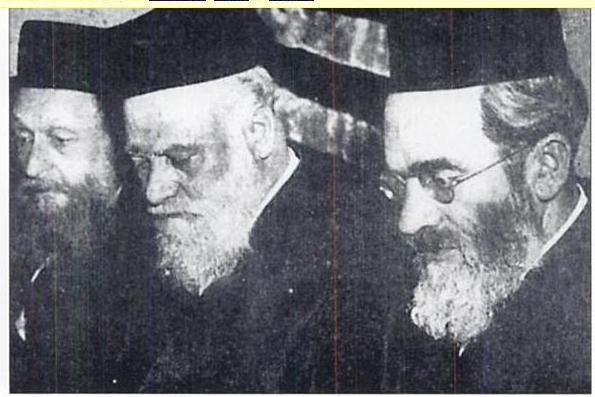
Rabbi Jacob Aizer Dubrow (left) and Rabbi George Silverstone (center), photographed together with Rabbi Joshua Klaven (right) of Talmud Torah Congregation in Southwest Washington, ca. 1935

After it was founded, the Georgetown Hebrew Benevolent Association hired Elias Stolar as "minister and Hebrew teacher" and "recognized religious leader." Born in Russia in about 1881, he was referred to as "reverend," a widely used title at the time for synagogue functionaries who were not ordained rabbis.

The synagogue's first spiritual leader was the Polish-born, British-trained Rabbi George (Gedaliah) Silverstone, who concurrently served Ohev Sholom Congregation (then located at 5th and I Streets, NW). He remained with both congregations until he announced his intention to make aliyah to the Land of Israel in 1923. While he made several return trips back to Washington after that, Rabbi Silverstone died in Jerusalem in 1944 and was buried on the Mount of Olives.

Rabbi Silverstone was a vice president of the Union of Orthodox Rabbis, a director of the Hebrew Sanitarium of Denver and the Hebrew Home for the Aged of Washington and a member of B'nai B'rith. He also founded the first Talmud Torah in Washington and many of his sermons refer to the poor state of Jewish education. An active Zionist, he attended the Sixth Zionist Congress in 1903 as a delegate from Belfast before he emigrated to the United States.

=== From 1925 to 1949 ===
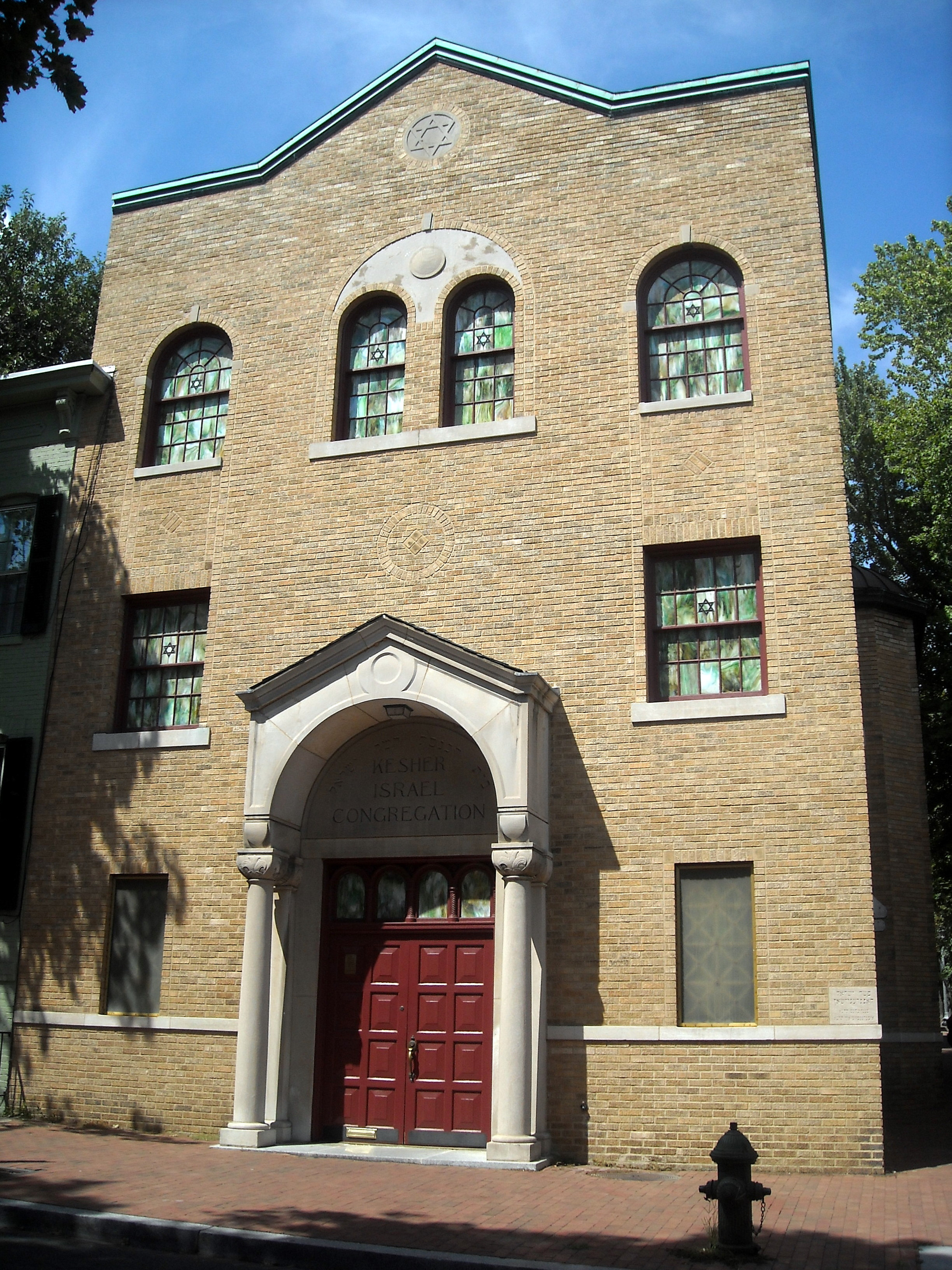
Kesher Israel

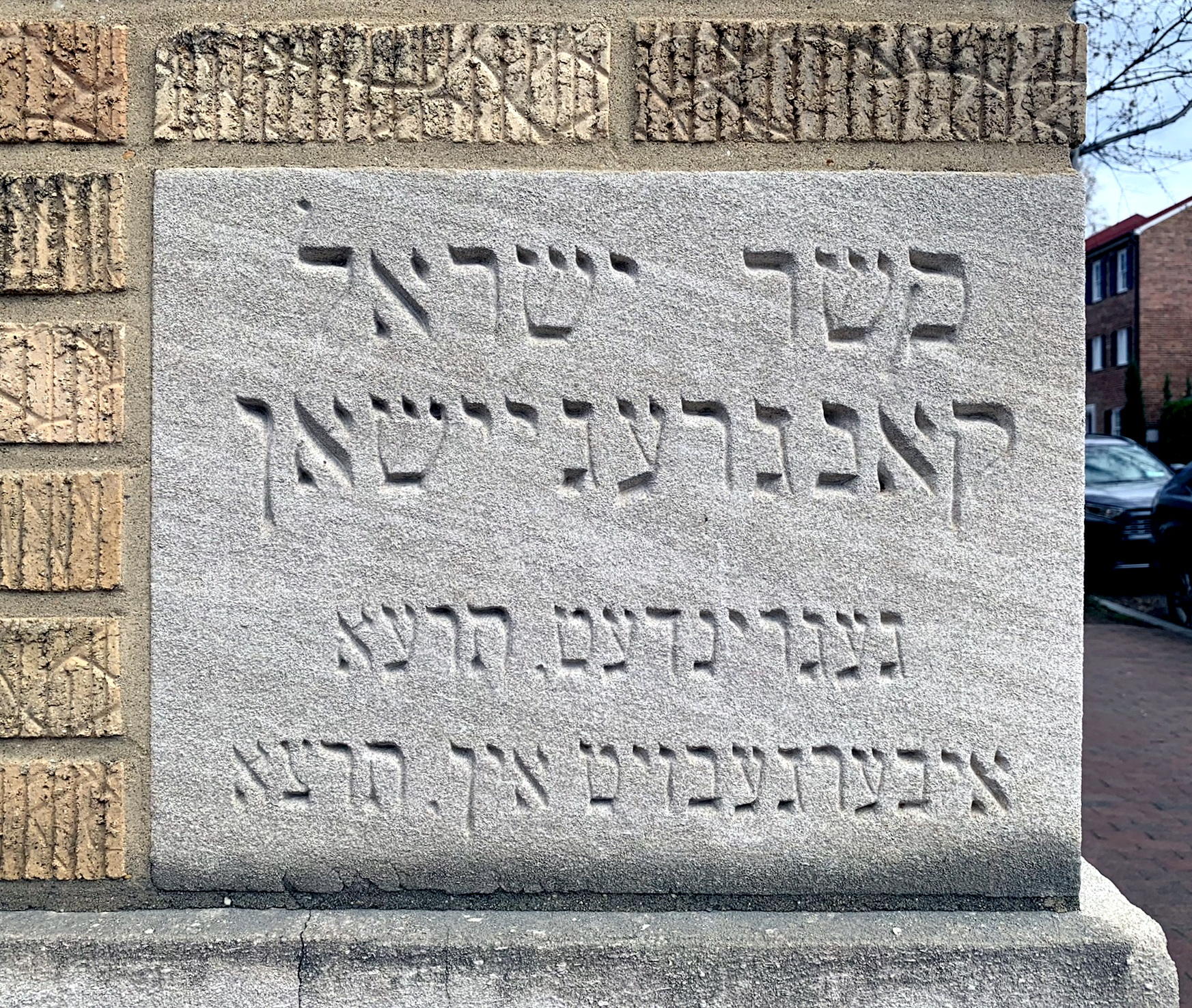
Cornerstone of the Synagogue building

The first rabbi named to lead Kesher Israel on an exclusive basis was Rabbi Jacob Aizer Dubrow, a Chabad hassid, who was appointed in 1925 and remained with the synagogue until his death in 1944 at the age of 64. Born in Žlobin in what is today Belarus, he was one of the original students of the fifth Lubavitcher rebbe, Sholom Dovber Schneersohn, at the Tomchei Temimim yeshiva in Lyubavichi, where he studied for seven years. After receiving semikhah, Rabbi Dubrow became the melamed of the son of the Skverer rebbe before becoming a rosh yeshiva in a town near Kiev. He then served as a rabbi and posek in a number of Ukrainian shtetlekh before leaving for Baltimore in 1924.

Rabbi Dubrow's main focus was education. He instituted daily Talmud classes, both at the synagogue and at the Hebrew Home for the Aged, and an afternoon Talmud Torah for the synagogue's children, hiring Rabbi Oscar Summer as their teacher. He was also one of four Washington rabbis who initiated the establishment of the city's first Jewish day school, the Hebrew Academy of Greater Washington (now known as the Melvin J. Berman Hebrew Academy). Rabbi Dubrow also organized a congregational hevra kadishah. He is remembered in Chabad for being instrumental in facilitating the wartime evacuation of the sixth Lubavitcher rebbe, Yosef Yitzchak Schneersohn, from German-occupied Warsaw in 1940 by interceding, together with several rabbinic colleagues, with President Franklin D. Roosevelt and a number of senators.

Rabbi Dubrow's first wife died after their arrival in the United States. He was survived by his second wife, five daughters and his only son, who had remained in the Soviet Union and would fall in battle as a soldier in the Red Army near the close of the war. Another married daughter had predeceased him. During his funeral at Kesher Israel parts of Pennsylvania Avenue, two blocks away, had to be closed off in order to accommodate the crowds that came to pay their last respects. Rabbi Dubrow bequeathed in his will that his personal library of religious books was to be auctioned off after his death and the money raised be donated to help support the poor of Jerusalem. Mention of this final act of charity was etched into his gravestone. He was buried in Kesher Israel's Capitol Heights cemetery.

Rabbi Dubrow was succeeded by Rabbi I. Meckler (1945–1946) and Rabbi Sidney Shulman (1946–1949).

=== From 1950 to 1988 ===
Rabbi Philip L. Rabinowitz was appointed rabbi of Kesher Israel in 1950. Born Jeruchem Fiszel Arje Rabinowicz in Łomża, Poland in 1920, he and his twin sister were the youngest of 13 children. With World War II on the horizon, he left home at the age of 18 to study at an American yeshiva, the Hebrew Theological College in Chicago, Illinois, where he would receive semikhah. His immigration to the United States was sponsored by his eldest brother, who had arrived in Chicago two years before he was born. Another brother emigrated to the Land of Israel in 1933 but his other relatives, including his parents, Rabbi Asher and Miriam Rabinowicz, were murdered in the Holocaust.

At Kesher Israel Rabbi Rabinowitz focused on three objectives: to study and teach Torah, sustain the daily minyanim and watch over the welfare of his community. His home was always open to anyone in need, even strangers, and he helped assure that the community was spiritually enriched. He was instrumental in founding the Washington Beit Din (rabbinical court) and the Vaad HaKashrut, Greater Washington's kosher food supervisory body.

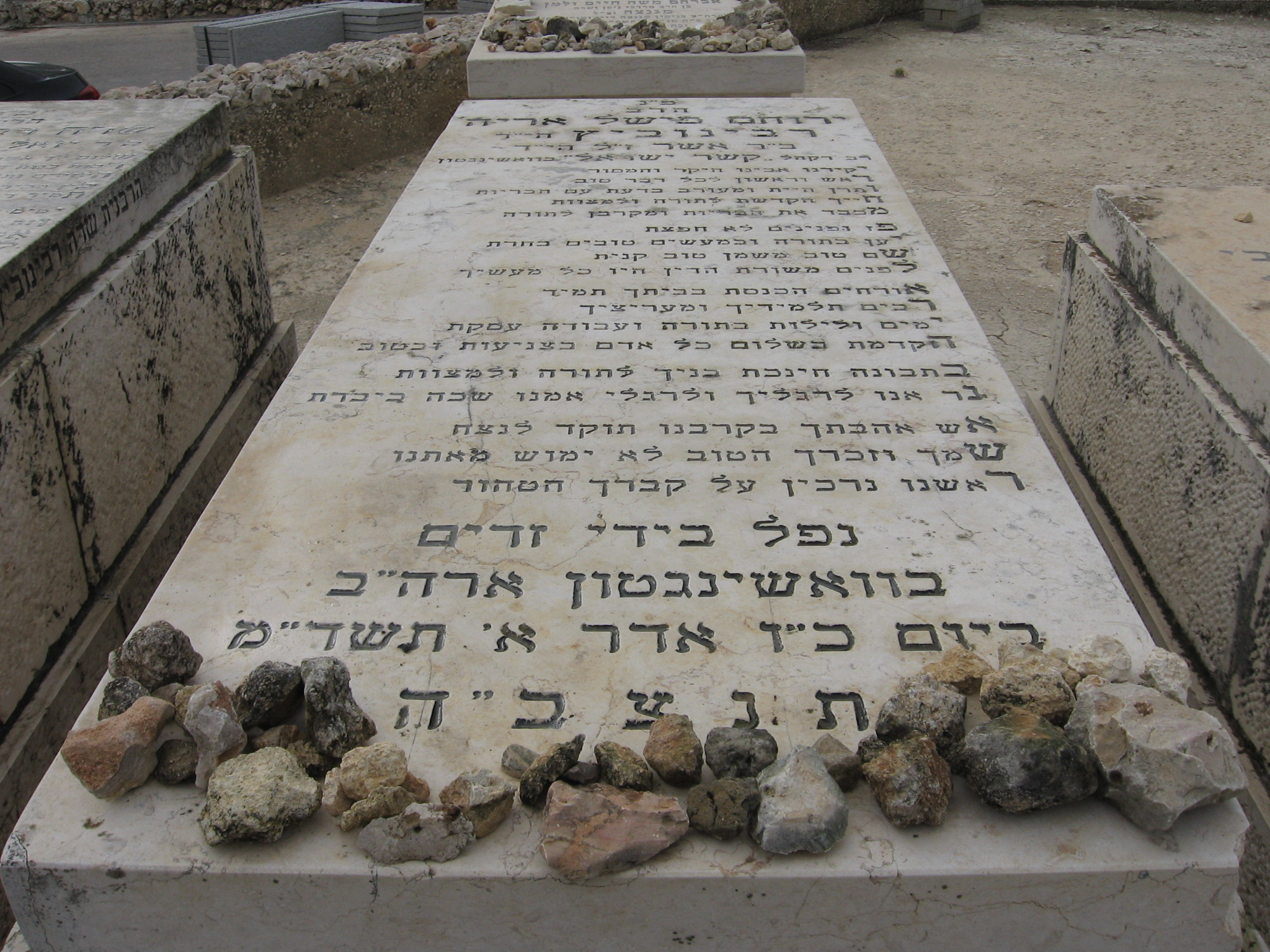
Rabbi Rabinowitz's tombstone at the Eretz HaHayyim Cemetery near Beit Shemesh, Israel

On the evening of February 28, 1984, Rabbi Rabinowitz, a 63-year-old widower who lived alone, was murdered in his West End home by an unknown assailant shortly after returning from Maariv. His bludgeoned body was found the next morning on the floor of his small study by four congregants whose concern was raised by his atypical absence from that morning's incomplete Shaharit minyan (had he attended, he would have been the tenth). It is presumed that the rabbi knew his murderer because he was always careful to peek out the window pane in order to check the identity of whoever rang his doorbell before opening the door. Moreover, while the door was closed and unlocked, there was no evidence of forced entry or robbery.

The case was never solved and remains open to this day.

An estimated one-thousand mourners attended Rabbi Rabinowitz's funeral held on the morning of March 1 at the synagogue, including the Israeli ambassador, Dr. Meir Rosenne, who delivered one of the eulogies. He was buried in Israel one day later next to his wife, who died unexpectedly from natural causes in 1978. He was survived by a son (named after his father), a daughter (named after his mother), several grandchildren, and his brothers in Chicago and Israel.

An eruv encompassing Georgetown, adjacent neighborhoods and all of downtown Washington was established by the congregation in 1990 and named in Rabbi Rabinowitz's memory. The Hebrew Academy, where he taught from 1958 to 1979, named its Kollel Beit Midrash in memory of the rabbi and annually presents its Rabbi Philip Rabinowitz Memorial Award for Excellence in Limudei Kodesh to outstanding students.

Rabbi Rabinowitz was succeeded by Rabbi Rod Glogower (1985–1988).

=== From 1989 to 2014 ===
Rabbi Dr. Barry Freundel was named to the pulpit of Kesher Israel in 1989. He would soon develop a reputation as "a brilliant scholar," a "profound" orator and an authority in several areas of halakha, including eruvim, which he assisted in constructing in a number of cities, including Washington.

In early October 2014 the lay leadership of Kesher Israel and the National Capital Mikvah, an independent facility located in an adjacent synagogue building that Freundel had been instrumental in founding in 2005, delivered to the police a suspicious clock radio that was placed in the mikvah shower room, disappeared and suddenly appeared again."Upon receiving information regarding potentially inappropriate activity, the board of directors quickly alerted the appropriate officials," the synagogue and mikvah boards wrote in a joint statement. "Throughout the investigation, we cooperated fully with law enforcement and will continue to do so."

On October 14, Freundel was arrested for recording women showering using the clock radio, which was equipped with a hidden video camera. He was suspended without pay upon his arrest and then fired. The synagogue board immediately directed its attention to the victims of his actions by arranging a support group led by a licensed psychologist and consultations with therapists, as well as organizing a closed community meeting with Cathy L. Lanier, Washington's chief of police.

On December 2, a student at Georgetown University Law Center, where Freundel taught a seminar on Jewish law, filed a lawsuit against Kesher Israel, as well as Georgetown University and the National Capital Mikvah. The unnamed student, who had written a term paper on the mikvah, seeks class action status and claims that the defendants turned a blind eye and failed in their responsibility to protect students from the rabbi, whose behavior she claims, was becoming ever more bizarre and who was mistreating women subjected to his authority. On December 18, a student at Towson University, where Freundel also taught, added her name to the lawsuit, claiming that Freundel encouraged her to take a "practice dunk" in the mikvah as part of her studies, even though she was not Jewish and had no interest in converting. She was joined by another woman who had been converting to Judaism under Freundel's auspices and who had likewise been encouraged by Freundel to take a "practice dunk." They added the Rabbinical Council of America as a defendant as well. In August 2016, the class action lawsuit was amended to add the Beth Din of America as a defendant, bring the total number of institutions named as defendants to four.

The synagogue board responded with this statement: "Kesher Israel's leadership is deeply concerned about the harm caused by Rabbi Freundel's actions—of which we did not and could not have known—and for the personal welfare of all those individuals who may have been violated. The lawsuits that were recently filed are completely without merit. Our energies remain focused on working towards healing our community and building a vibrant future for Kesher Israel."

Freundel ultimately pleaded guilty to 52 counts of voyeurism and was sentenced to six-and-a-half years in prison and fined $13,000.

On October 22, 2018, a class action lawsuit against Freundel and four religious organizations named as defendants – Kesher Israel, the National Capital Mikvah, the Rabbinical Council of America, and the Beth Din of America – was settled for $14.25 million.

=== From 2015 ===
In July 2015 the congregation hired Rabbi Dr. Avidan Milevsky as its part-time interim spiritual leader. Milevsky, an associate professor of psychology at Kutztown University of Pennsylvania, was the author of five books and previously served as interim rabbi of Ner Tamid Greenspring Valley Congregation in Baltimore. The Milevsky family made aliyah to Israel a year later.

On March 16, 2017, the synagogue announced the appointment of a full-time replacement, Rabbi Hyim Shafner, who had been serving for the previous 13 years as a congregational rabbi in St. Louis. He formerly served for eight years as the Hillel chaplain at Washington University in St. Louis and, before then, worked for a year in the Jewish community in Mumbai, India.

Kesher Israel was the target of an antisemitic incident on December 17, 2023, when a man from Toledo, Ohio illegally parked his U-Haul van on the sidewalk in front of the synagogue and then attempted to gain entry into the building while the rabbi was conducting a class. When he was unable to open the locked door, he shouted "gas the Jews" and sprayed a foul-smelling substance on two congregants who had exited the building. The man was arrested by Metropolitan Police and charged with multiple offenses, including a hate crime. Earlier on the same day, multiple Jewish institutions and synagogues in Washington, including Kesher Israel, received bomb threats by email, which the police had deemed to be "non-credible."

In 2024, following the acquisition of an adjacent property, the congregation announced an $18 million renovation campaign that would greatly expand its facilities.

== Notable past and present members ==
- Peter Beinart, political pundit and former editor of The New Republic
- Laura Blumenfeld, journalist, author and U.S. State Department official
- Marshall Breger, Ford, Reagan and George H. W. Bush administration official
- Alex Brummer, British journalist, editor and author
- Warren Cikins, Kennedy and Johnson administration official and member of the Fairfax County Board of Supervisors
- Jaime Daremblum, former Costa Rican ambassador to the U.S.
- Peter Deutsch, former U.S. Representative from Florida
- Norman L. Eisen, former U.S. ambassador to the Czech Republic
- David Epstein, former assistant U.S. attorney and Georgetown Law adjunct professor
- Eugene R. Fidell, president of the National Institute of Military Justice
- Dan Glickman, former Secretary of Agriculture and U.S. Representative from Kansas
- Linda Gradstein, journalist and former correspondent for NPR
- Linda Greenhouse, Pulitzer Prize-winning former Supreme Court correspondent of The New York Times
- Tova Herzl, former Israeli ambassador to South Africa, ambassador to the Baltic states and congressional liaison at the Embassy of Israel in Washington
- Michael Herzog, former Israeli ambassador to the U.S. and retired IDF general
- Jeff Jacoby, journalist and syndicated newspaper columnist
- Lucette Lagnado, author and reporter for The Wall Street Journal
- Frederick M. Lawrence, former president of Brandeis University
- Jack Lew, former United States Secretary of the Treasury
- Nathan Lewin, attorney, former U.S. Department of Justice official and former contributing editor of The New Republic
- Joseph Lieberman, former U.S. Senator from Connecticut, and Hadassah Lieberman
- Deborah Lipstadt, historian and diplomat
- Bethany Mandel, American conservative commentator
- Mark Mellman, Democratic pollster and political consultant
- Jay Michaelson, writer and LGBT activist
- Alfred H. Moses, former U.S. ambassador to Romania and Carter administration official
- Jeremy A. Rabkin, professor of law at Antonin Scalia Law School at George Mason University
- Andrew H. Schapiro, former U.S. ambassador to the Czech Republic
- Mitchell Silk, former Assistant Secretary of the United States Department of the Treasury for International Affairs
- Tevi Troy, presidential historian and former Deputy Secretary of the United States Department of Health and Human Services
- Kenneth R. Weinstein, former president and CEO of the Hudson Institute
- Mindy Weisel, abstract visual artist and author
- Baruch Weiss, Washington attorney and former federal prosecutor
- Leon Wieseltier, former literary editor of The New Republic, dismissed contributing editor of The Atlantic, and author, whose book Kaddish notes his attendance at Kesher Israel's daily minyanim during the eleven-month mourning period following his father's death
- Herman Wouk, Pulitzer Prize-winning author
