= Yeshivat Sha'alvim =

Location
- Sha'alvim; Israel
- Coordinates: 31.8696°N 34.9856°E

Information
- Denomination: Orthodox
- Established: 1961
- Founder: Rabbi Meir Schlesinger
- Principal: Rabbi Michael Yammer
- Gender: Males
- Enrollment: over 300.
- Campus type: Rural

Yeshivat Sha'alvim is a hesder yeshiva, a kollel and a yeshiva high school for boys, located in Kibbutz Sha'alvim. It is one of the most prestigious Yeshivas in central Israel.

== History ==
Yeshivat Sha'alvim was founded in 1961 by Meir Schlesinger, the rabbi of Kibbutz Sha'alvim. The yeshiva, like the kibbutz, was originally affiliated with Poalei Agudat Yisrael ("Agudat Israel Workers"). Schlesinger was the rosh yeshiva for over 30 years.

The yeshiva's campus includes a kollel (for rabbanut and dayanut), a teachers college, a yeshiva high-school for boys, an ulpana high school for girls, an elementary school and a Talmud Torah. In the early 1990s a National Religious yishuv named Nof Ayalon was built around the Sha'alvim educational campus. Over 400 families live in the yishuv including many graduates of the yeshiva.

The yeshiva also has a post-high-school seminary for girls from the United States and other countries, in Jerusalem.

The yeshiva is headed by Rav Michael Yammer, son of Max Jammer; the kollel is headed by Gidon Binyamin, rabbi of Nof Ayalon.

In 2006 Yeshivat Sha'alvim took control of the Isaac Breuer Institute (also formerly affiliated with Poalei Agudat Israel), which issues the scholarly quarterly HaMa'ayan.

== Overseas program ==
Yeshivat Sha'alvim has a program for students from countries including the United States, the United Kingdom, Canada, France, Belgium, Hungary, South Africa and Australia. Over 100 students attend it annually. In 2004, Sha'alvim opened a women's division of its overseas program in Jerusalem. Approximately 80 young women attend the program annually and another 15 return for a second year of study.

== Notable alumni ==
Alumni of Yeshivat Shaalvim include:

- David Hirsch, Rosh Yeshiva at Rabbi Isaac Elchanan Theological Seminary (RIETS), an affiliate of Yeshiva University
- Yona Reiss, former dean of RIETS and current Av Beth Din of the Chicago Rabbinical Council (cRc)
