= Gedaliah (name) =

Gedaliah Gedalia (Hebrew: גדליה) and some other spellings, is a Hebrew given name. It means "made great by God." Notable people with the name include:

== Biblical figures ==
- Gedaliah, son of Ahikam (2 Kings and Jeremiah)
  - Fast of Gedaliah, an annual Jewish day of fasting, the third day of Tishrei
- Gedaliah, son of Pashhur, one of the nobles who conspired against Jeremiah (Jeremiah 38:1)
- Gedaliah, son of Amariah (Zephaniah 1:1)

== Others ==
- Gedaliah ibn Yahya ben Joseph (c.1515 – c.1587), a 16th-century Italian talmudist
- Gedaliah Alon (1901–1950), an Israeli historian
- Gedaliah Anemer (1932-2010), an Orthodox rabbi
- Gedaliah Bublick (1875–1948), a Yiddish writer and Zionist leader
- Gedalia Gal (b. 1933), an Israeli politician
- Gedalio Grinberg (1931-2009), a Cuban-born watchmaker
- Gedale B. Horowitz (1932-2020), an American banker
- Gedaliah Aharon Koenig (1921-1980), an Israeli rabbi
- Gedali Kunyavsky (1916-1981), a Soviet engineer
- Gedaliah Nadel (1923-2004), an Israeli rabbi
- Gedalia Schorr (1910–1979), a Polish-American rabbi who was Rosh Yeshiva (dean) of Torah Vodaath
- Gedaliah Silverstone (1871-1944), an Orthodox rabbi
- Gedali Szapiro (1929-1972), a Polish-Israeli chess master
- Gedalyahu Fuchs (1911-1966), a Romanian footballer
- Gedalia Dov Schwartz (b. 1925), head of the Chicago Rabbinical Council
- Geoff Schwartz (born 1986), American football player whose birth name was Gedalia Yitzhak Schwartz
- Gdalyahu Vilbushevich (1865-1943), an architect and engineer from the Russian Empire

== Fictional ==
- "Gedali", a short story by Isaac Babel from the Red Cavalry

== See also ==
- Gedalya (disambiguation)
- Gdal, a short form of the name
