= Izhak Weinberg =

Holocaust survivor

- Born: 1938 (age 87–88); Kraków, Poland
- Occupation: Artist
- Spouse: Ilana
- Children: Zohar, Hila

Izhak Weinberg (born 1938) is one of the youngest Holocaust survivors, who lost his family of 60 in a single day. He and his younger brother hid for several years in different villages in Europe and survived.

For the last 30 years he has been intensively involved in the project of imparting the lessons of the Holocaust to Yad LaYeled, which includes personal testimony and the establishment of commemorative corners, created from his wall hangings, in memory of the 1.5 million children who were murdered in the Holocaust. To date, 42 memorial centers have been set up throughout the country, including 329 hand-woven tapestries, hand-woven in his home, with the assistance of his vision, the theme of which is the anti-thesis of the Holocaust and symbolizes the victory of the spirit over Nazi Germany.

== About ==
He is one of the few Holocaust survivors left, and for 25 years he has accompanied the trips to Poland as a witness, bringing youth to the scene of the Belzec Death Camp.

There is another reference on Belzec Death camp in this link:

He sought to share his first-hand story of survival with the younger generation. Only a small handful of survivors, who decided to dedicate their lives, were left to convey the terrible story of the past to the younger generation.

In 2006, Yad Vashem published his book Three Mothers for Two Brothers, which tells of his survival and his brothers during the war. Channel 8 also produced a film called "Day Care in Hell" that focuses on their survival at Bergen-Belsen in Germany.

In 2011, he produced the film "Here I Learned to Love", based on his book, describing his and his brothers' survival in Poland, Hungary, Germany and Switzerland, which was shown on Channel 2 on the eve of Holocaust Remembrance Day in 2012. Since then,

The film has been translated into 5 languages and is screened in all communities around the world. There is a reference to this movie in a NY Times article.

Since 2011, he has continued researching the extermination camp at Belzec, where the ashes of his entire family are buried, including archaeological excavations at the site.

Near the end of his life, Izhak Weinberg completed Polish Tune, an 11-minute film about the Bełżec extermination camp.It is called "Polish Tune" (English and Hebrew versions). The film addressed the killing methods used in the gas chambers of the Operation Reinhard camps: Bełżec, Sobibor, and Treblinka.

Weinberg’s family was among the victims of the Holocaust. According to accounts about the film, members of his immediate and extended family were murdered at Bełżec. The film was intended to document the memory of the victims and to counter Holocaust denial and antisemitism.

The film includes imagery associated with Weinberg’s recollections of Bełżec, including Jewish musicians near the entrance to the gas chambers, geraniums beside the stairs, and a Star of David above the entrance.

There is another reference on Izhak Weinberg life and accomplishments in this link

== Life ==
Izhak Weinberg was born in 1938 in Kraków, Poland to Jewish family. His parents names were Mordechai and Minda Weinberg. In 1941 the family was deported to the Kraków Ghetto. In June 1942, there was a large aktion in the ghetto, and the entire family of 60 people was sent to the extermination camp in Belzec. At the same day the whole family was killed in the gas chambers of the camp. Weinberg and his brother Avner were smuggled out of the ghetto by his aunt, Avin's sister Malka, and his uncle Yitzhak to Shatil's house, and for two years they were hidden among the local gentiles.

In February 1944, they were smuggled through Czechoslovakia to Hungary, but only one month later, in March 1944, Nazi Germany entered Budapest and the demonic dance began again.

In June 1944, the aunt who smuggled them to Hungary brought the brothers as hidden passengers to the Kasztner train, assuming that this was a rescue train intended to reach Palestine. Due to short negotiations between Kasztner and Eichmann, the rescue train was transferred to Germany and all its passengers 1684 + the two hidden children, ended in the Bergen-Belsen concentration camp.

As their language was Polish, while the other passengers were Hungarian-speaking, they found themselves again in the heart of hell alone, without any relatives. Weinberg was five and a half years old then, left to care for his younger brother. A 20 year old young woman adopted them in camp for 180 days. Their native language was changed from Polish to Hungarian.

In December 1944, the rest of the surviving group was released and transferred under the agreement between Kasztner and Eichmann to Switzerland. In Switzerland, they are slowly recovering and gradually returning to normal life, but now Naomi, the girl who adopted them and became a loving and devoted mother in the camp, committed suicide.

In September 1945, they were transferred to the port of Bari in Italy and from there sailed on the illegal immigrant ship "Will Duran" to Palestine. As soon as they arrived in Palestine, they were transferred by the British to the Atlit detention camp. They stayed in the camp for several weeks.

On October 11, 1944, The day after the night of the break-in to Atlit, they are transferred to Agudat Israel's Sanhedria institution in Jerusalem, and study in the "cheder" Torah and mitzvot. Here the Hungarian language is replaced by Yiddish. After a few months, as a result of a lack of accommodation, they are smuggled from there and transferred to the Tehiya Bnei Akiva youth center in Petah Tikva for three years. Here, for the fourth time, their language of Yiddish is changed to Hebrew and studied at the Netzach Yisrael boys' school.

In 1949, the Youth Aliyah closed the Tehiya institution and all the children were transferred to Raanana's Kfar Batya youth village. Where he was educated until 1955. In that school he studied with Yaffa Eliach who later married the principal of the school. From there he begins his studies at the Air Force Technical School and continues to serve as a career soldier until 1964, during which he completes his matriculation exams.

As he did not have close family ties, the Air Force base effectively served as his residence, and he remained there during breaks, including Sabbaths and holidays. Consequently, little institutional support was available for soldiers without family connections, and individuals were largely left to manage their circumstances independently.

In this context, he devoted significant time and effort to his professional responsibilities and advancement. His commitment contributed to a rapid progression in rank, which provided him with a sense of achievement within his military career.

Weinberg viewed his time in the air force as the happiest period in his life. There he also found his partner Ilana.

In 1960. he married Ilana and established a family with her. He had two daughters. Zohar was born in 1967 and served as an infantry instructor, today a doctor in biology. Hila was born in 1969 and served in the Armored Corps in the Golan Heights. And today a teacher at Ma'alot High School. Both are married and have three granddaughters and three grandchildren.

Between the years 1964 and 1977 he worked as an independent in the automotive spare parts industry.

Since 1977, he studied art for three years at the University of Haifa and for two more years in the Ein Hod artists village, specializing in weaving wool-wall carpets.

In 1981, he was accepted as a member of the National Painters and Sculptors Association and continues to study for another year with teacher Shmuel Bonneh.

In 1987, the "Lapid" movement, led by Aryeh Barnea, initiated a conference of Kasztner train survivors. After a 45-year-old elm, he tells the story of his survival in its entirety, including the escape from the Kraków ghetto, the Kasztner train, Bergen-Belsen, Switzerland, Italy, Atlit, .

Recently Izhak Weinberg started taking Harmonica lessons with Ami Luz from Harmonica Breeze and produced a video that reflects the soul of a Jewish boy who survived the Holocaust and brings a universal message to the world from the Jewish people. The song is based on the Pslams.
