= Gdal =

Gdal (Hebrew: גדאל) is a Jewish surname, a short form of Gedaliah. Notable people with the name include:

- Gdal Gelshtein (1917-1989), Soviet cardiologist
- Gdal Maslyansky (1906-1993), Soviet chemist
- Gdal Oksegendler (1929-1994), Soviet chemist
- Gdal Saleski (1890-1966), American musician

== See also ==
- GDAL
