= Beth Din of America =

Orthodox Jewish rabbinical court in the U.S.

The Beth Din of America is an Orthodox beth din (court of Jewish law) serving Jews throughout the United States of America as a forum for arbitrating disputes through the din torah process, obtaining Jewish divorces, family law, and confirming Jewish personal status issues. It was founded in 1960 and reconstituted in 1994. The Beth Din is affiliated with the Orthodox Rabbinical Council of America (RCA) and sponsored by the Union of Orthodox Jewish Congregations of America. The current director of the Beth Din is Rabbi Shlomo Weissmann, who succeeded Rabbi Yona Reiss in 2008.

== Leadership ==
The Beth Din of America is overseen by a lay board of directors, although that body does not decide cases or make policy in the realm of Jewish law issues. The actual work of the Beth Din of America is overseen by its rabbinic leadership, consisting of:

- Rabbi Gedalia Schwartz (deceased), Av Beis Din
- Rabbi Mordechai Willig, S'gan Av Beth Din
- Rabbi Yona Reiss, Chaver Beth Din
- Rabbi Shlomo Weissmann, Menahel (Director)
- Rabbi Michoel Zylberman, S'gan Menahel (Associate Director), Gittin Coordinator

The day to day operations and case management of the Beth Din of America are managed by the Beth Din's operations staff, which consists of Rabbi Shlomo Weissmann (Director), Rabbi Michoel Zylberman (Associate Director) and Jordana Mondrow (Administrative Attorney). In addition, Rabbi Itamar Rosensweig is the editor of Jewishprudence, a blog which publishes periodic updates on policies of the organization and discussions of Jewish law and beth din jurisprudence.

== Publications ==
In 2012, the Beth Din of America launched The Journal of the Beth Din of America, a periodical that contains articles on Jewish jurisprudence and beth din practice, with a particular emphasis on the policies and practices of the Beth Din of America. Each issue of the Journal includes anonymized versions of actual din torah (arbitration) decisions issued by the Beth Din of America. Two issues of The Journal of the Beth Din of America were published. In 2019, the Beth Din of America launched Jewishprudence: Thoughts on Jewish Law and Beth Din Jurisprudence, a first-in-the-nation blog dedicated to explaining Rabbinical Court process and decisions. The goals of Jewishprudence are to make the din torah process more transparent and accessible, and to create a sophisticated forum for discussions of Jewish law as it applies to the contemporary commercial marketplace. Rabbi Itamar Rosensweig was named the editor of Jewishprudence in 2019.
