= Menachem Penner =

American rabbi

Rabbi Menachem Penner

Personal life
- Born: 1969 (age 56–57)
- Education: Yeshivat Har Etzion, Yeshiva University

Religious life
- Religion: Judaism
- Denomination: Modern Orthodox

Jewish leader
- Predecessor: Yona Reiss
- Synagogue: Young Israel of Holliswood, Queens
- Yeshiva: Rabbi Isaac Elchanan Theological Seminary
- Began: July 1, 2013
- Ended: December 21, 2023
- Semikhah: Rabbi Isaac Elchanan Theological Seminary

Menachem (Marc) Penner (Hebrew: מנחם פעננער; born 1969) is an American Modern Orthodox rabbi and executive vice president of the Rabbinical Council of America (RCA). He formerly served as the Max and Marion Grill Dean of the Rabbi Isaac Elchanan Theological Seminary of Yeshiva University and Dean of Men's Undergraduate Torah Studies Program at Yeshiva University. Penner is the Rabbi Emeritus of the Young Israel of Holliswood.

== Education ==
Following high-school, Penner attended Yeshivat Har Etzion in 1988, then headed by Aharon Lichtenstein and Yehuda Amital. He graduated from Yeshiva College in 1991 and received Semicha from RIETS in 1994.

== Career ==
Penner served as the spiritual leader of the Young Israel of Holliswood in Queens for 20 years, a position he was elected to in 1996. He is now the Rabbi Emeritus. He continues to teach, focusing on Tanach, Tefillah and Machshavah in Queens and in communities worldwide.

In 2013, Penner was elected Max and Marion Grill Dean of the Rabbi Isaac Elchanan Theological Seminary. He succeeded Yona Reiss and began his deanship on July 1, 2013. In December 2023 it was announced that Rabbi Penner would be leaving RIETS and beginning a new position as vice president of the Rabbinical Council of America.

== Personal ==
Penner is the parent of an individual with special needs. He speaks across the United States on issues of families facing disabilities. Penner also has a son who is a member of the LGBTQ community.
