= Yona Reiss =

American rabbi (born 1966)

Rabbi Yona Reiss
- Born: Jonathan Reiss; 1966 (age 59–60); New York City, New York, USA
- Education: Yeshivat Shaalvim, Yeshiva University (BA), Yale University (J.D)
- Occupations: Lawyer, Dean, Rabbi
- Spouse: Mindy Reiss

Yona (Jonathan) Reiss (born 1966 in New York City) is an American rabbi, Torah scholar, attorney, lecturer, and jurist, and the current Av Beth Din of the Chicago Rabbinical Council (cRc). From 2008 to 2013 Reiss was the Max and Marion Grill Dean of Rabbi Isaac Elchanan Theological Seminary (RIETS). From 1998 to 2008 he was Director of the Beth Din of America.

== Education ==
Reiss attended the Yeshiva University High School for Boys in New York. Later, he learned in Yeshivat Shaalvim in Israel before graduating summa cum laude from Yeshiva University in 1987 with a BA in philosophy. He also learned briefly in Yeshivat Har Etzion and Ponevezh Yeshiva. Reiss was privileged to maintain close relationships with some of the greatest Torah luminaries of his generation including Rav Gedalia Dov Schwartz ztl, Rav Aharon Lichtenstein ztl, Rav Moshe David Tendler ztl, Rav Zevulun Charlop ztl, Rav Yoel Schwartz ztl, Rav Nota Greenblatt ztl, and is a student of yblc"t Rav Hershel Schachter shlita and Rav Mordechai Willig shlita. He received his rabbinic ordination from RIETS (Rabbi Issac Elchanan Theological Seminary) in 1991, where he also earned the distinction of Yadin Yadin later in 2002. He received his J.D. from Yale Law School in 1992, and served as a senior editor of the Yale Law Journal.

== Career ==
From 1992 to 1998, Reiss worked as an associate at the international law firm of Cleary Gottlieb Steen & Hamilton in New York City. He maintained an association with the firm until 1999. He is a member of the New York State Bar Association, and was a certified mediator for the City of New York court system, and was a member of the Family and Divorce Mediation Council for New York.

In 1998, Reiss assumed the position of Director of the Beth Din of America, a position he served until 2008, when he was appointed the Dean of Rabbi Isaac Elchonon Theological Seminary (RIETS). Reiss serves on the editorial board of Tradition magazine. A frequent writer on a variety of topics relating to both Jewish and secular law, he has published widely in Jewish publications, as well as in the Wall Street Journal and New York Law Journal.

In 2013, Reiss stepped down as Dean at Yeshiva University and assumed the position of Rosh Yeshiva. He was succeeded by Rabbi Menachem Penner. Since 2013, Reiss serves as the Av Beth Din of the Chicago Rabbinical Council. He is also the executive authority who makes final decisions with regards to the CRC's kosher supervision service.

== Personal life ==
Reiss and his wife Mindy have five sons and a daughter and live in Chicago, IL. Reiss is the son of Harry Reiss, a Rockland County town councilman who taught at Yeshiva University and Rockland Community College.
