= Yaffa Eliach =

Polish-American historian and writer

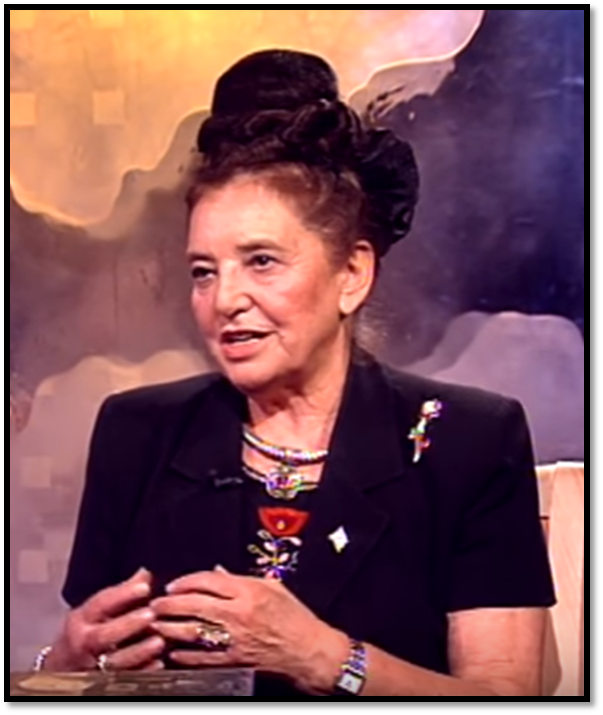
- Yaffa Eliach
- Born: Yaffa Sonenzon; May 31, 1937 (Note: sources vary on birth year giving 1935, 1936, or 1937); Ejszyszki, Second Polish Republic (now Eišiškės, Lithuania)
- Died: November 8, 2016 (aged 81); Manhattan, New York, United States
- Education: Brooklyn College, City University of New York
- Occupation: Historian
- Known for: Founding Director of the Center for Holocaust Studies, Documentation and Research

Yaffa Eliach (May 31, 1935 – November 8, 2016) was an American historian, author, and scholar of Judaic studies and the Holocaust. In 1974, she founded the Center for Holocaust Studies, Documentation and Research in Brooklyn, New York, which collected over 2,700 audio interviews of Holocaust survivors as well as thousands of physical artifacts. Eliach created the "Tower of Faces" made up by 1,500 photographs for permanent display at the US Holocaust Museum in Washington, D.C.

== Biography ==
Yaffa Eliach was born Sonia Sonenzon (Yiddish name Shayna) to a Jewish family in Ejszyszki (Yiddish: איישישאָק/Eishyshok) near Vilna. It is a small town now Eišiškės, Lithuania, but before the war it was part of Second Polish Republic, and had a Jewish majority until the Holocaust.

Eliach lived there until she was four years old. Following the Soviet takeover in 1939, her father became involved with the Soviet authorities. When the town was occupied by the Germans in June 1941, most of the Jewish population were murdered by the Germans and Lithuanians, including 200 of Eliach's relatives.

Eliach's six immediate family members hid and were sheltered by landowner Kazimierz Korkuc and farmer Antoni Gawryłkiewicz, both Poles. The family members were:

- Father Moshe
- Mother Zipporah
- Older brother Yitzhak
- Shayna (Yaffa)
- Baby brother Hayyim (I), who died when other refugees in an attic in Radin muffled his crying, which would have betrayed their hiding-place
- Baby brother Hayyim (II), born later while they were still in hiding

In 1944, following the Soviet takeover of the town from Nazi Germany, Eliach's family returned to the town. Soon thereafter, her father again became involved with the Soviet authorities. Her father began to house Soviet soldiers. During a fight between Polish resistance and Soviet forces, two members of Eliach's family and two Soviet soldiers were killed. Eliach claimed that her mother and baby brother, who had begun crying, were shot multiple times after her mother, wanting to save the rest of the family, stepped out of a closet they were hiding in, and that she survived underneath her mother's body that had fallen back down on her in the closet. Eliach said her family members were shot deliberately in an act of antisemitism.

=== Post war ===
Eliach emigrated to Palestine in 1946, changing her name to Yaffa Ben Shemesh, a play on words of her previous Yiddish name, Shayna Sonenzon (Yaffa is a Hebrew translation of the Yiddish Shayna; son and sun are homophones of "ben" and "shemesh"). In Israel, she attended Kfar Batya. Another student at the school, Izhak Weinberg, who was three years younger than Yaffa, remembered her as a most positive, talented and gifted student. The principal of her school was David Eliach, whom she married in 1953. She became a history teacher in the school while still a teenager.

The couple emigrated to the United States in 1954. Eliach received her B.A. in 1967 and her M.A. in 1969 from Brooklyn College, New York and a Ph.D. in 1973 from City University of New York in Russian intellectual history, studying under Saul Lieberman and Salo Baron.

== Career ==
From 1969, Eliach served as a professor of history and literature in the department of Judaic Studies at Brooklyn College. She created a course on Hasidism and the Holocaust, and she found that many of her students were the children of Holocaust survivors, liberators, or Holocaust survivors themselves. She began requiring students to record audio interviews with Holocaust survivors in their community as a course assignment.

In 1974, Eliach established the Center for Holocaust Studies to serve as a repository for these interviews. Initially housed at the Yeshiva of Flatbush, the Center grew to include professional staff, over 2,700 interviews, and thousands of physical objects donated by Holocaust survivors. Her organization became the model for many other similar efforts, and changed the dialog about Holocaust victims to include more focus on their pre-Holocaust lives. In 1990, the Center merged with the Museum of Jewish Heritage, where its oral history collection, objects, and institutional archives are now housed.

Eliach served as a member of President Jimmy Carter's Commission on the Holocaust in 1978-79 and accompanied his fact-finding mission to Eastern Europe in 1979. She was a frequent lecturer at numerous conferences and educational venues and has appeared on television several times in documentaries and interviews. She wrote several books and contributed to Encyclopaedia Judaica, The Women's Studies Encyclopedia, and The Encyclopedia of Hasidism.

Eliach devoted herself to the preservation of the memory of the Holocaust from a survivor's vantage point. She preserved her memories (via lecture) on video and audiocassettes, and her research provided much material used in courses on the Holocaust in the United States. She thought her generation "the last link with the Holocaust", and considered it her responsibility to document the tragedy in terms of life, not death, bringing the Jews back to life.

In memory of her hometown, Eliach created the "Tower of Life", a permanent exhibit that contains approximately 1,500 photos of Jews in Eishyshok before the arrival of the Germans for the U.S. Holocaust Museum in Washington, D.C.

In 1953, Eliach married David Eliach, who served for decades as principal of the Yeshivah of Flatbush High School. They had a daughter, Smadar Rosensweig, Professor of Bible at Stern College for Women (NYC), and a son, Yotav Eliach, the principal emeritus of Rambam Mesivta High School. Yaffa Eliach had 14 grandchildren, including Itamar Rosensweig, and nine great-grandchildren, at the time of her death in New York on November 8, 2016.

== Works ==
=== Hasidic Tales of the Holocaust ===
Eliach is the author of Hasidic Tales of the Holocaust (Oxford University Press). Derived from interviews and oral histories, these eighty-nine original Hasidic tales about the Holocaust provide unprecedented witness, in a traditional idiom, to the victims' inner experience of "unspeakable" suffering. This volume constitutes the first collection of original Hasidic tales to be published in a century.

According to Chaim Potok, Hasidic Tales is "An important work of scholarship and a sudden clear window onto the heretofore sealed world of the Hasidic reaction to the Holocaust. Its true stories and fanciful miracle tales are a profound and often poignant insight into the souls of those who suffered terribly at the hands of the Nazis and who managed somehow to use that very suffering as the raw material for their renewed lives." And, as Robert Lifton wrote "Yaffa Eliach provides us with stories that are wonderful and terrible -- true myths. We learn how people, when suffering dying, and surviving can call forth their humanity with starkness and clarity. She employs her scholarly gifts only to connect the tellers of the tales, who bear witness, to the reader who is stunned and enriched."

=== There Once Was a World: A 900-Year Chronicle of the Shtetl of Eishyshok ===
In memory of her native Eishyshok she wrote There Once Was a World: A 900-Year Chronicle of the Shtetl of Eishyshok (1998). The book was a finalist for the National Book Award.

== Dispute over death of Eliach's family members ==
Eliach's eyewitness testimony was published and widely disseminated in a New York Times op-ed, in which she said she was a victim of a pogrom by Poles and the Polish Home Army. Eliach claimed that prior to the attack, the Polish commander outside the houses concluded his order with what she claims was a popular Home Army slogan "Poland without Jews". According to historian John Radzilowski, Eliach was never able to produce any documents supporting her claim such slogans were used.

Israeli historian Israel Gutman criticized Eliach stating "I don't have sympathy for this author; she's not an authority on Holocaust, and her books haven't been translated to Hebrew. One shouldn't close eyes to the fact that the Home Army in the Vilnius region fought with Soviet partisans for the liberation of Poland. That's why Jews that belonged to the other side were killed by the Home Army as enemies of Poland, and not as Jews".

Polish-Jewish journalist Adam Michnik, founder of the liberal Gazeta Wyborcza newspaper, said she insulted Poland and that while "individual anti-Semitic excesses could have happened(...)it is shocking and out of place for a professional historian to blame everyone for a crime committed by one individual" and that the Eliach's claim was "senseless fanaticism". A Polish American Public Relations Committee member said that "Holocaust survivors tend to be revisionist, wanting to satisfy their egos, defame others and financially profit". Eliach responded by saying that "several fringe Polish-American groups, following in the footsteps of Holocaust revisionists, set out to deny the truth about the murder of Zipporah and Hayyim Sonenzon, my mother and baby brother".

Historian Jaroslaw Wolkonowski did not deny the incident, but said Eliach omitted to mention that her family was harboring a Soviet spy and that her father was a supporter of the Soviet Union, who had occupied the area from Poland and later Nazi Germany. Polish Historian Tadeusz Piotrowski questioned the Home Army's motivations to commit a pogrom in Eishyshok, which was a Soviet garrison town and points out that freeing 50 captured Polish fighters who were held prisoner in the town might have been the target of the raid. Piotrowski also pointed out a NKVD agent, belonging to a SMERSH unit, was in the house. Lithuanian historian and political scientist Liekis Sarunas has also said that the available historic documents do not support Eliach's version of the event as being an attack on Jews while showing that her family and friends "were clearly on the side of the NKVD and even directly served them" and thus became part of the "Soviet repressive structure". John Radzilowski said that Eliach believed that the Home Army with the help of the Catholic Church held a conference similar to the Wanesee Conference in which a plan to mass murder all remaining Jews was discussed, and death of her family was part of a "Polish Final Solution". Radzilowski also stated that Eliach was questioned on her claims and documents supporting them by members of US Holocaust Memorial Museum Memorial Council, and responded by joking "they didn't have Xerox machines", later changing her version to stating that the documents were found by Soviet secret police, and later again changing her claim and stating that this document was found by her father and NKVD in raid against the Home Army

The Polish Ministry of Justice asked the U.S. Justice Department to allow lawyers to interview Eliach so that a case could be opened to investigate if any guilty party was still alive. Eliach refused, saying that the request was "couched in Orwellian language" about bringing the killers of her mother and brother to justice, when they were already tried and punished by the Soviets more than 50 years prior. Eliach questioned the lack of the Polish investigation into other murders of Jews by Poles in Poland, and into Holocaust denial in Poland.

According to a documentary article in Gazeta Wyborcza written in 2000 in which Eliach was interviewed, Eliach herself claimed that the Polish Home Army slogan was "Poland without Jews" and that it planned the mass extermination of all Jewish people within Poland. The article also mentioned her stating that the primary goal of the Polish Home Army was killing Jews. Two historians interviewed in the article have rejected Eliach's claims and described the death of her family members as most likely a coincidence during a shoot out between Polish resistance and Soviet and NKVD operatives.

== Legacy ==
- The Tower of Life: How Yaffa Eliach Rebuilt Her Town in Stories and Photographs by Chana Steifel and Susan Gal (Scholastic Press, 2022) is a Sibert Honor-winning children's book about Yaffa Eliach.

== Honors and awards ==
- Myrtle Wreath award for humanitarian activities (with Joseph Papp), 1979;
- Christopher award, 1982, for Hasidic Tales of the Holocaust;
- Guggenheim fellowship and Louis E. Yavner award, both in 1987;
- Women's Branch of the Orthodox Jewish Congregation of America's "Distinguished Woman of Achievement," 1989;
- AMIT Women's Rambam award, 1990;
- Award of accomplishment, 1994, and National Holocaust Education award, 1995, Union of Orthodox Jewish Congregations;
- CBSTV "Woman of the Year," 1995;
- Eternal Flame award, 1999;
- Honorary doctorates: Yeshiva University, New York; Spertus College, Chicago; Keene State College, 2003

== Bibliography ==
- Eishet ha-Dayag [Hebrew; The Fisherman's Wife]. 1965.
- The Last Jew: A Play in Four Acts, with Uri Assaf (Tel-Aviv, 1975). 1977.
- Liberators: Eyewitness Accounts of the Liberation of Concentration Camps 1981
- Hasidic Tales of the Holocaust 1988
- We Were Children Just Like You 1990
- There once was a world: A 900-Year Chronicle of the Shtetl of Eishyshok 1998
