= Eišiškės =

City in Dzūkija Region, Lithuania

Eišiškės Ejszyszki (Polish)
- City
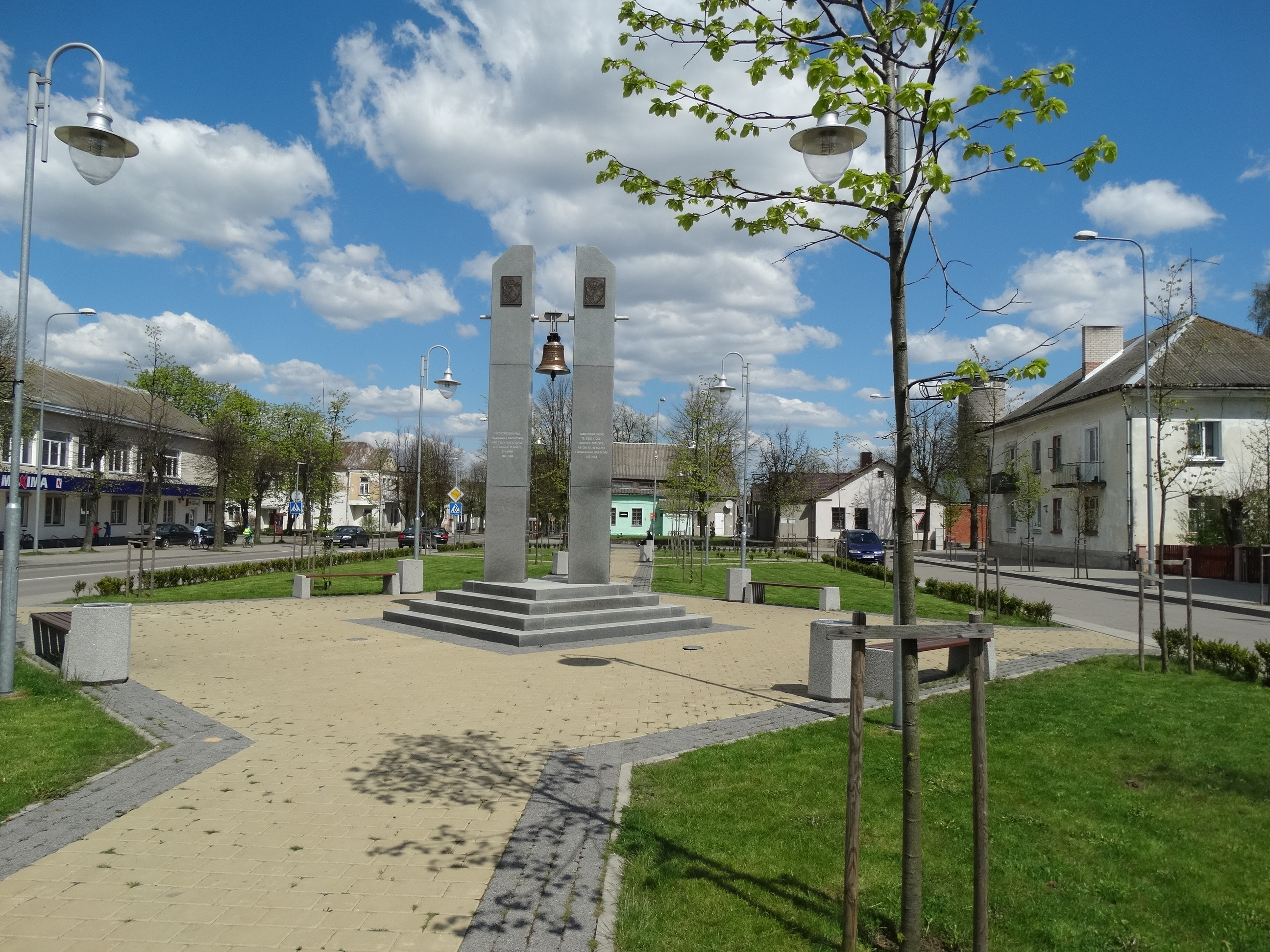
- Central square of Eišiškės

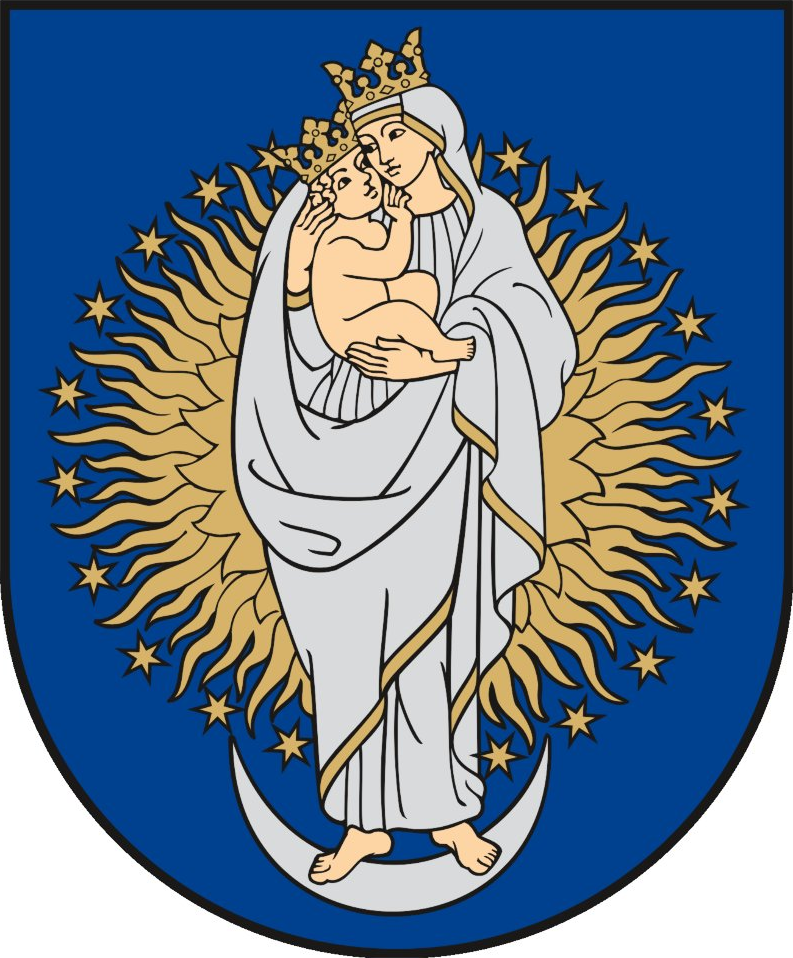
- Coat of arms

- Location of Eišiškės
- Coordinates: 54°10′N 25°00′E
- Country: Lithuania
- Ethnographic region: Dzūkija
- County: Vilnius County
- Municipality: Šalčininkai District Municipality
- Eldership: Eišiškės eldership
- Capital of: Eišiškės eldership
- First mentioned: 1384
- Granted city rights: 1950

Population (2021)
  - Total: 2,908
- Time zone: UTC+2 (EET)
  - Summer (DST): UTC+3 (EEST)

Eišiškės (Note: Polish: Ejszyszki, German: Eiksiskendorf, Russian: Эйши́шки/Eishishki, Belarusian: Эйшы́шкі/Eishyshki, Yiddish: אײשישאָק/Eyshishok/Eishishok,) is a city in southeastern Lithuania on the border with Belarus. It is situated on a small group of hills, surrounded by marshy valley of Verseka and Dumblė rivers. The rivers divide the city into two parts; the northern part is called Jurzdika. As of the census in 2011, Eišiškės had a population of 3,416. It has a hospital and two high schools (one for Polish and another for Lithuanian students).

== Names ==
According to the Lithuanian Chronicles, the settlement was named after Eikšys, possibly one of the sons of Karijotas.

According to Yaffa Eliach,

"Local Jewish folklore had its own account of how the name of the town came into being: Once upon a time in the early days of the shtetl, a man came home and was greeted by his wife with a special treat of freshly cooked varenie (preserves), made from the berries that grow in such abundance in the region. Not realizing they were still sizzling hot, he took a big bite and scorched his tongue, which caused him to yell "Heishe-shok!" (Hot sauce!) at the top of his lungs."

== History ==
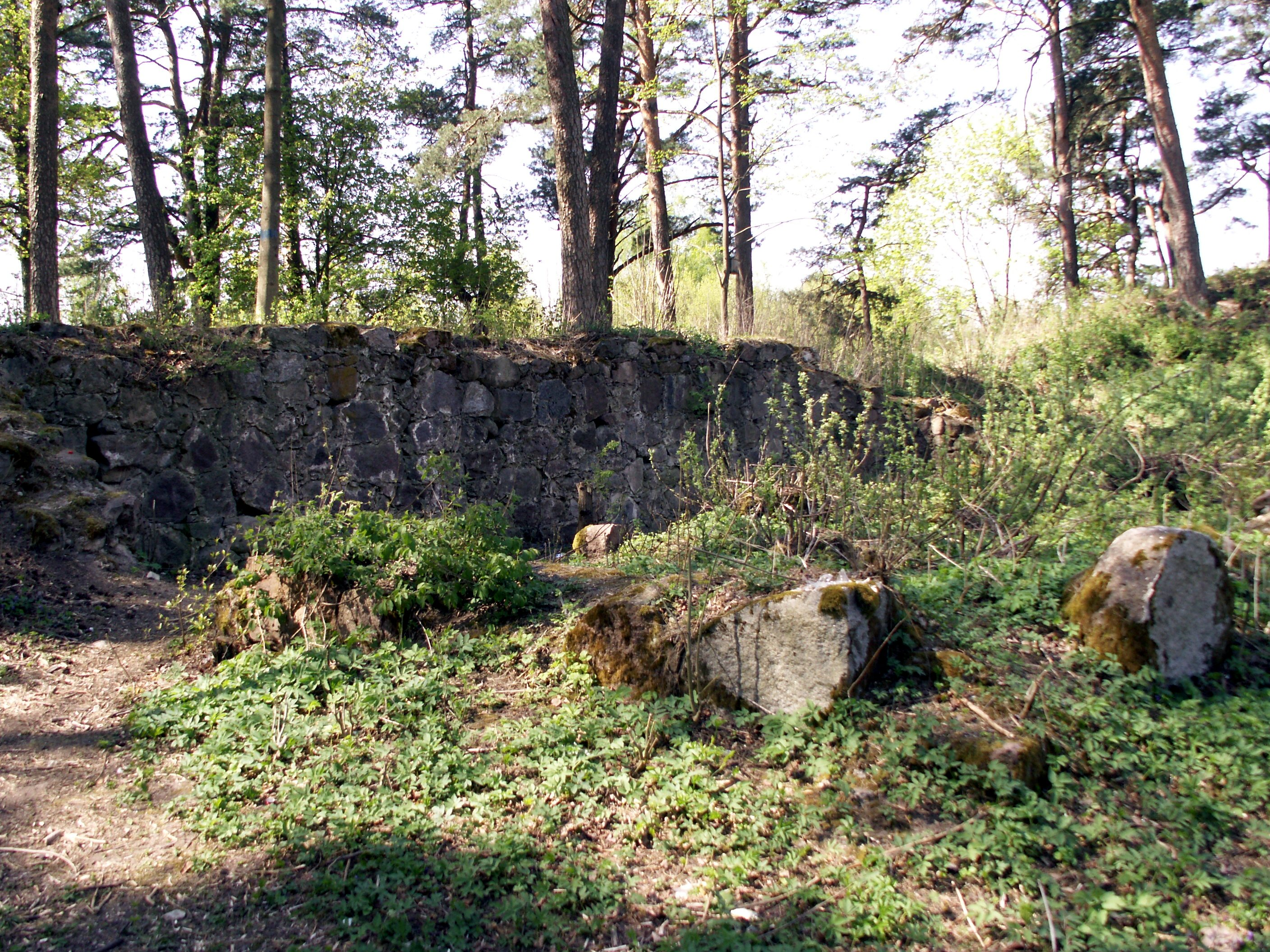
Ruins of the Eišiškės Castle

Eišiškės is mentioned for the first time in the Treaty of Königsberg (1384) between Grand Duke Vytautas and the Teutonic Knights. East of the town there is a castle site, dating back from the 14th–15th centuries. Historian Ignas Jonynas argued that Anna, Grand Duchess of Lithuania and wife of Vytautas was a sister of Sudimantas, a nobleman from Eišiškės and commander of Vytautas' army. An important route, connecting Vilnius, Hrodna, and Warsaw, ran through the town. Protected by the castle and boasting a church built by Vytautas, the town became one of the important trading centers in the Grand Duchy of Lithuania. It had a court and here nobles gathered for a sejmik.

Eišiškės was sacked and burned in 1655 during the Russian invasion and in 1706 during the Great Northern War. The town lost the majority of inhabitants and lost its former status as a trade center. At the end of the 17th century, in hopes to revive the economy, Eišiškės were granted Magdeburg rights and became known for its horse and cattle markets. The former market square and surrounding streets are protected as urban heritage since 1969. The town's importance decreased after the partitions of the Polish–Lithuanian Commonwealth, especially after it was sacked during the French invasion of Russia. However, the town grew rapidly following the Uprising of 1863 and the abolition of serfdom. After a few devastating fires, residents started constructing brick buildings. The town continued to be known for its markets and for its carriages. Eišiškės was part of the Nowogródek Voivodeship of the Second Polish Republic during the interwar years. During World War II, the town witnessed some fighting between the Polish Armia Krajowa, Nazi Wehrmacht, and Soviet Red Army.

=== Jewish history ===
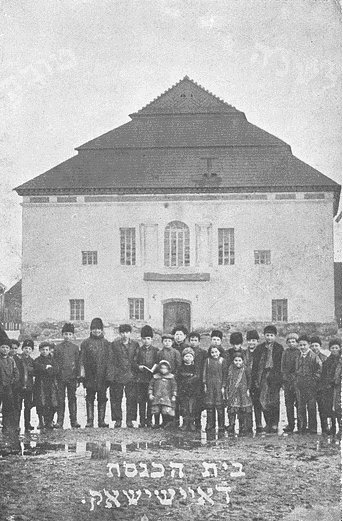
Great Synagogue, early 20th century

According to Jewish sources, there were tombstones dating from as early as 1097 at the former Jewish cemetery, making Eishishok one of the oldest Jewish settlements in Eastern Europe. In the 18th century, the Jewish population accounted for about half of the population, and as the town grew, the proportion of Jewish residents increased, hitting a peak of 80% in 1820.

By 1921, according to the 1921 Polish Census, Jews no longer constituted a majority in the town: Poles 1688 (70.86%), Jews 687 (28.84%), 7 Tatars (0.3%).

In the Holocaust, German troops came in Eišiškės on June 23, 1941, and on September 21, 1941, an SS Einsatzgruppen entered the town, accompanied by Lithuanian auxiliaries. More than four thousand Jews from Eishishok and its neighboring towns and villages were first imprisoned in three synagogues and then taken in groups of 250 to the old Jewish cemetery where SS men ordered them to undress and stand at the edge of open pits. There, Lithuanian auxiliary troops shot them. The old cemetery is now a site of remembrance with a memorial stone in three languages. The new cemetery was destroyed in 1953 and turned into the yard of a kindergarten. Some of the private Jewish buildings survive and are protected as part of the urban heritage. One school is now a library, while another was demolished.

No Jews are known to live in the town today. The history of Jewish Eyshishok has been documented in the book There Once Was A World by Yaffa Eliach, professor at Brooklyn College, and popularized in the Sibert Honor-winning children's book The Tower of Life: How Yaffa Eliach Rebuilt Her Town in Stories and Photographs by Chana Steifel and Susan Gal (Scholastic Press, 2022).

== Demographics ==
Population by ethnicity (2011)
| Poles | 83.26% (2844) |
| Lithuanians | 8.37% (286) |
| Russians | 3.19% (109) |
| Roma | 2.02% (69) |
| Belarusians | 1.64% (56) |
| Ukrainians | 0.5% (17) |
| Others | 1.02% (35) |

Today Poles form a majority: they constitute some 80% of the population within the Šalčininkai District Municipality. Eišiškės also has a small community of Romani people, numbering some 34 families. It dates from at least 1780 when King Stanisław August Poniatowski appointed a certain Znamirowski as community's elder. In 2001, in Eišiškės 42 students of Roma descent received financial assistance from an education fund.

Historical population

| Year | Pop. | ±% |
|---|---|---|
| 1833 | 630 | — |
| 1861 | 751 | +19.2% |
| 1897 | 3,196 | +325.6% |
| 1931 | 2,839 | −11.2% |

| Year | Pop. | ±% |
|---|---|---|
| 1959 | 2,532 | −10.8% |
| 1970 | 3,477 | +37.3% |
| 2008 | 3,765 | +8.3% |
| 2011 | 3,416 | −9.3% |

== Religion ==
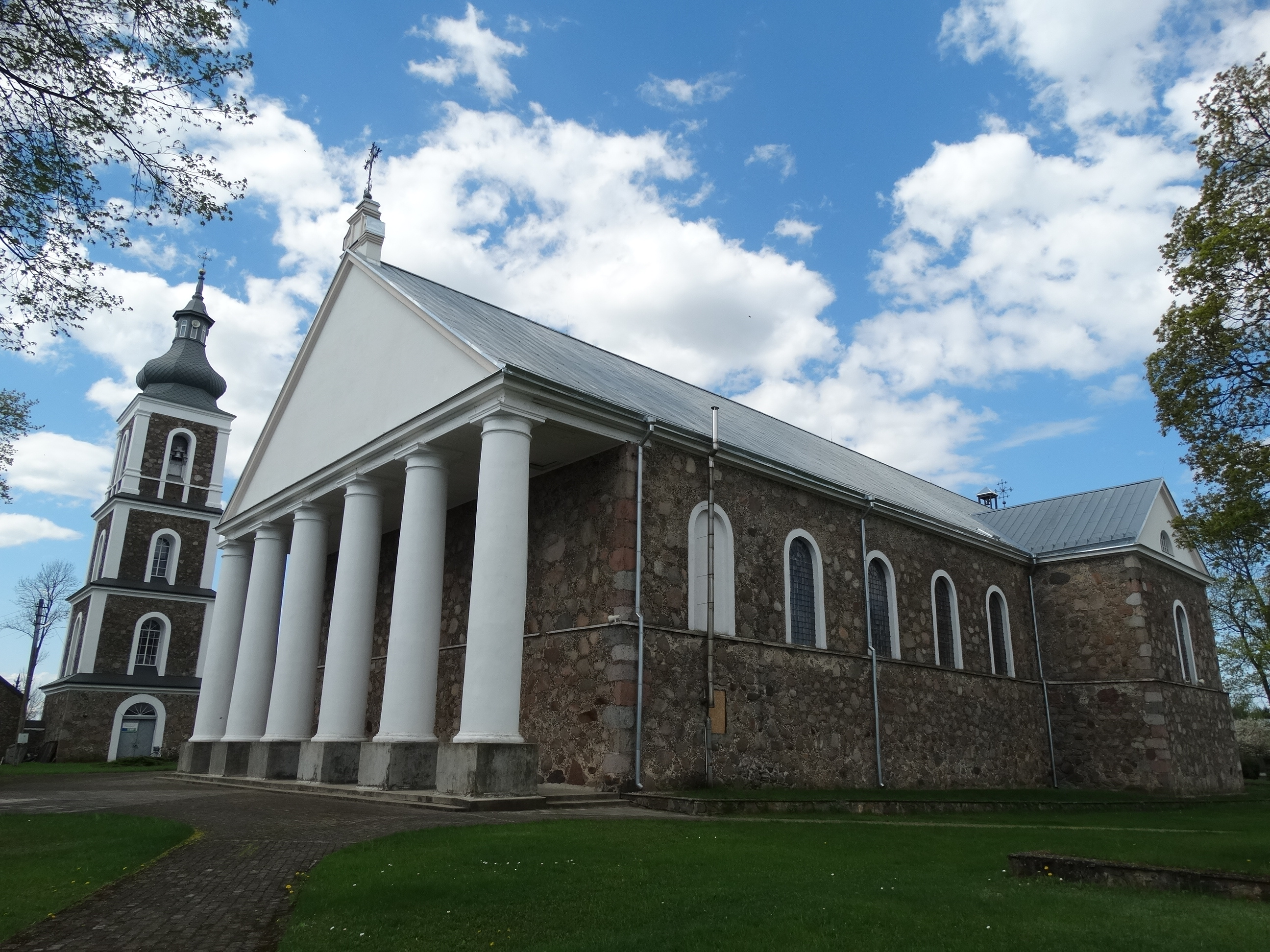
Church of the Ascension of Christ, built in 1852

The first church was probably built in 1398 by Grand Duke Vytautas. It was one of the first churches built in Lithuania after the Christianization of Lithuania in 1385. It is suggested that the church was burned during the Lithuanian Civil War (1431–1435). It was rebuilt on another site. About 1500 a second church was built in the southern part of the town. Likely both churches burned down during the Muscovite invasion. A small poor church was rebuilt, but before it could be improved it was burned by the Swedes. In 1707, a wooden church was built with a two-story tower and three-story belfry. By the 1770s, it was falling apart and needed reconstruction. The construction included the rectory and a wooden parish school. In 1845 a plan was drafted by historian Teodor Narbutt for a new brick church in neoclassical style. The construction was finished in 1852 and the church preserves its basic design to this day. The church, built of field stones, has a portico with six Doric columns. It is accompanied by a four-story belfry with a Baroque cap. The church lost its tower. The plain exterior is contrasted with the interior, decorated in light Baroque style. Three paintings, housed in the church, are protected as monuments of national importance.

The former synagogues are either destroyed or abandoned, including one that was reconstructed into a sport hall by the authorities of the Lithuanian Soviet Socialist Republic.

== Education ==
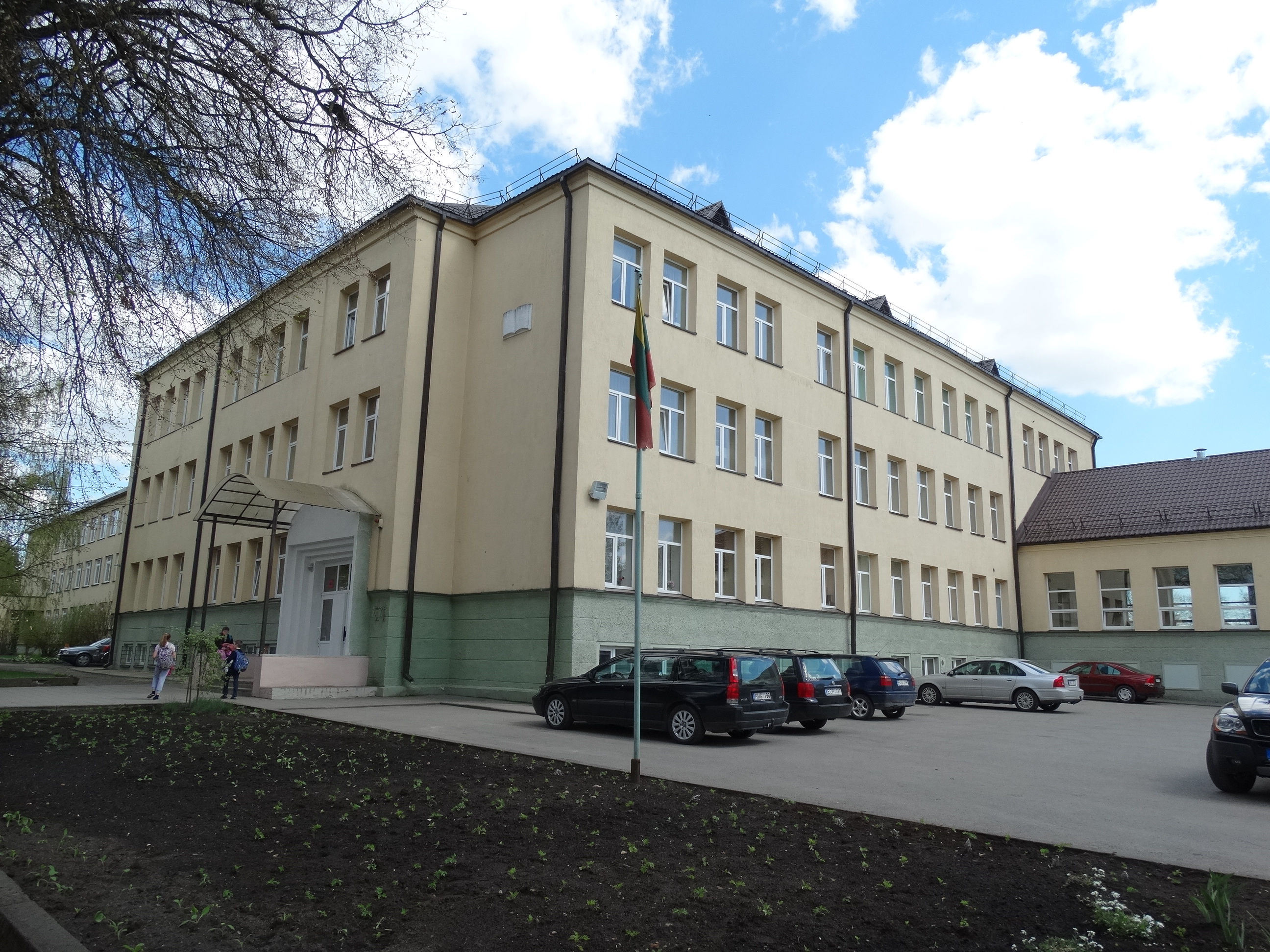
Polish school

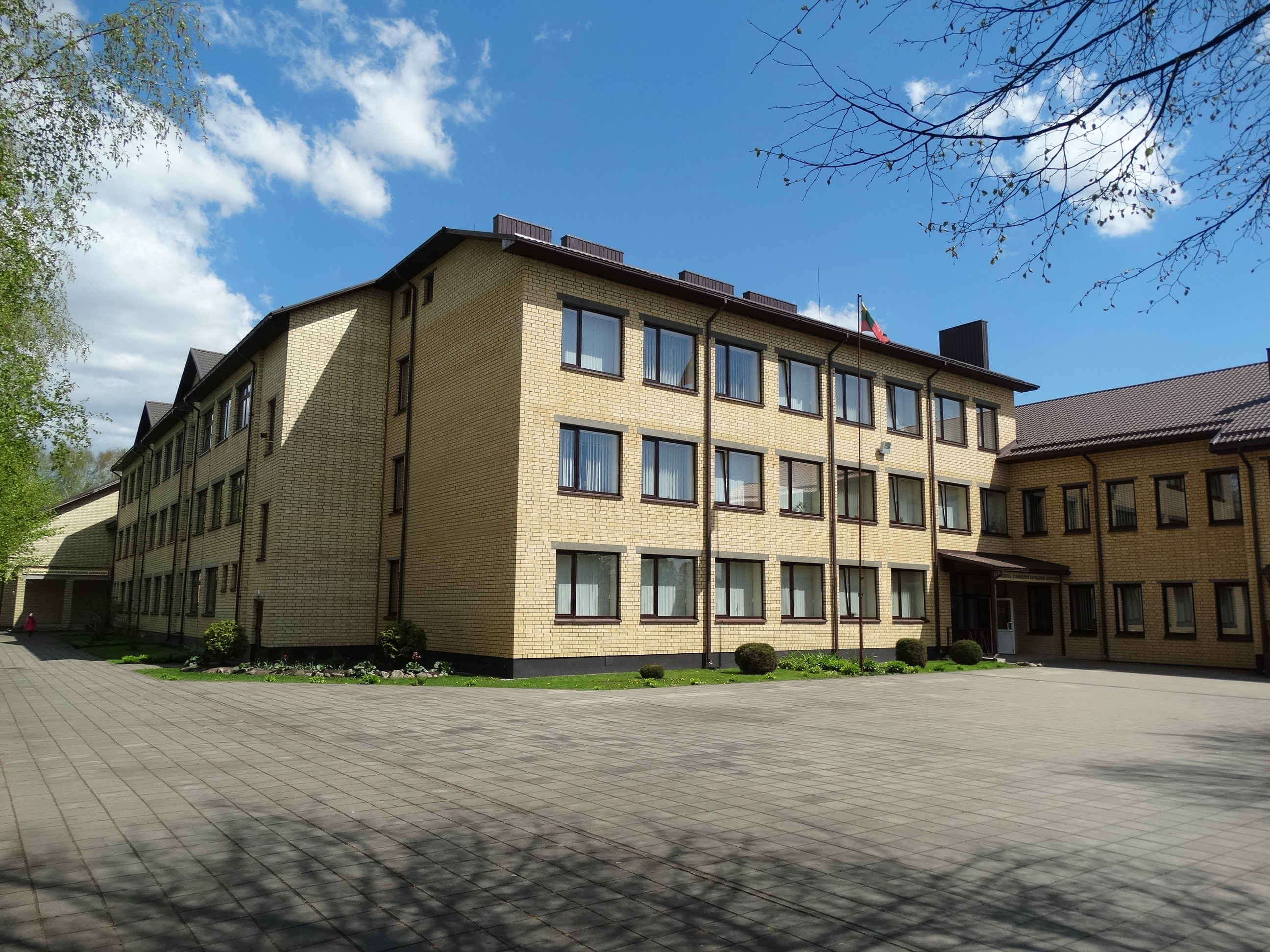
Lithuanian school

The first school, attached to the church, was established in 1524. It was one of the first schools in Lithuania. A seven-year school was established in 1921, but up until 1938 it did not have a separate building and had to rent rooms from private individuals. Before the new school building could properly open, World War II began and Germans seized the building and established a command post. The school was bombed and suffered heavy damage. After the war, the school was rebuilt and classes commenced in three languages: Russian, Polish, and Lithuanian. As the number of students grew, an extension was built in 1967. Russian school moved out in 1983 and Lithuanian in 1992. In 2006, the Polish school earned the name of Eišiškės Gymnasium and had 602 students and 79 teachers. The Lithuanian school, named after Stanislovas Rapalionis, had 460 students in 2006. The Russian "Viltis" school was attached to the Lithuanian school.
