= Itamar Rosensweig =

New York City Rabbi

Rabbi Itamar Rosensweig

Rabbi of The Merion Shtiebel

Maggid Shiur, Yeshiva University

Dayan, Beth Din of America

Personal details
- Relatives: Son of Rabbi Michael Rosensweig, grandson of Yaffa Eliach
- Education: Yeshiva University, Columbia University, Rabbi Isaac Elchanan Theological Seminary, University of Pennsylvania
- Occupation: Rabbi, Maggid Shiur, Dayan
- Known for: Editor of Jewishprudence: Thoughts on Jewish Law and Beth Din Jurisprudence

Itamar Rosensweig is a rabbi and maggid shiur at Yeshiva University in New York City and a dayan (rabbinic judge) at the Beth Din of America, where he also serves as the editor of Jewishprudence: Thoughts on Jewish Law and Beth Din Jurisprudence. Rabbi Rosensweig is also the Rabbi at The Merion Shtiebel in Merion Station, Pennsylvania, and teaches Jewish Business Law and Ethics at YU's Sy Syms School of Business. Previously, he taught an advanced Talmud shiur at Columbia University's Kraft Center, and presently serves as the maggid shiur at the University of Pennsylvania Hillel. He is the son of Rabbi Michael Rosensweig, and grandson of Yaffa Eliach.

== Education and Teaching ==
Itamar Rosensweig received his BA, with honors, in physics and philosophy from Yeshiva University, his MA in philosophy from Columbia University, and his Semikhah, Yoreh Yoreh and Yadin Yadin, from the Rabbi Isaac Elchanan Theological Seminary, where he was a fellow of the Wexner Kollel Elyon and Editor in Chief of the Beit Yitzchak Journal of Talmudic and Halakhic Studies. He also holds an PhD in medieval Jewish history from the Bernard Revel Graduate School of Yeshiva University and a PhD in philosophy from University of Pennsylvania.

He studied Talmud closely with Rabbi Aharon Lichtenstein at Yeshivat Har Etzion and the history of Halakha with Professor Haym Soloveitchik at Yeshiva University. He is a close disciple of and studied for over a decade with his father, Rabbi Michael Rosensweig. He taught an advanced Talmud shiur at Columbia University's Kraft Center, a weekly chazarah shiur at the Rabbi Isaac Elchanan Theological Seminary, and served as the rabbinic scholar at Congregation Ahavath Torah in Englewood, NJ.
