= Smadar Rosensweig =

Smadar Rosensweig (Smadar Eliach) is an adjunct assistant professor of Bible at Yeshiva University's Stern College for Women. Prior to that she served as lecturer of Judaic studies and history at Touro College.

Smadar Rosensweig received her B.A. from Barnard College and M.A. from Azrielli (Yeshiva University) Barnard College. She delivers shiurim and lectures extensively throughout the New York metropolitan area.

She is the daughter of Rabbi David Eliach and Dr. Yaffa Eliach, Holocaust scholar and professor emeritus at Brooklyn College.

In 1983 she married Rabbi Michael Rosensweig, a Rosh Yeshiva at RIETS and Rosh Kollel of its Beren Kollel Elyon.
