= Linda Gradstein =

American journalist

Linda Gradstein is an American journalist. She is the Israel bureau chief for The Media Line news agency.

Gradstein was the Israel correspondent for NPR News from 1990 until 2009. As a freelance reporter she has reported for PRI's The World and AOL News and other venues such as Slate. Gradstein is a member of the team that received the Overseas Press Club award for her coverage of the assassination of Israeli Prime Minister Yitzhak Rabin and the team that received Alfred I. DuPont-Columbia University Award for Excellence in Broadcast Journalism for her coverage of the Persian Gulf War. Linda spent 1998-9 as a Knight Journalism Fellow at Stanford University.

== Background ==
Gradstein has covered important events in Israel and the West Bank and Gaza Strip including the intifada, the mass immigration of Soviet immigrants to Israel, the return of Palestinian leader Yasser Arafat to Gaza, the rise of Hamas, the assassination of Yitzhak Rabin, the Persian Gulf war, and two elections in Israel.

Gradstein earned a bachelor's degree in Foreign Service from Georgetown University in 1985 and a master's degree in Arab Studies. She spent a year as a Rotary Fellow at the American University in Cairo. She speaks both Hebrew and Arabic.
