= Ann Strickler Zweig =

Scientist

- Education: B.S., University of Kansas; M.S., University of Colorado Boulder
- Occupation: Scientist

Ann Strickler Zweig is a scientist at the University of California, Santa Cruz's Jack Baskin School of Engineering.

Zweig is a senior program manager with the UCSC Genome Browser project. Zweig was one of the Web of Science Group's 2019 recipients of the highly-cited-researchers designation under biology and biochemistry. The designation "identifies scientists and social scientists who produced multiple papers ranking in the top 1% by citations for their field and year of publication, demonstrating significant research influence among their peers."

Zweig is also involved in the UCSC SARS-CoV-2 Genome Browser, a research tool for the virus that causes COVID-19.

== Previous work ==
Zweig co-founded and was the president and chief operating officer of Omni-Vista, Inc., a corporation in Colorado.

Zweig holds a patent for a "method for providing bi-directional propagation among data within spreadsheets."

Zweig was a writer in The Wiley Guide to Project Technology, Supply Chain, and Procurement Management.
