= Adolf Rosenzweig =

German rabbi and Biblical and Talmudic scholar

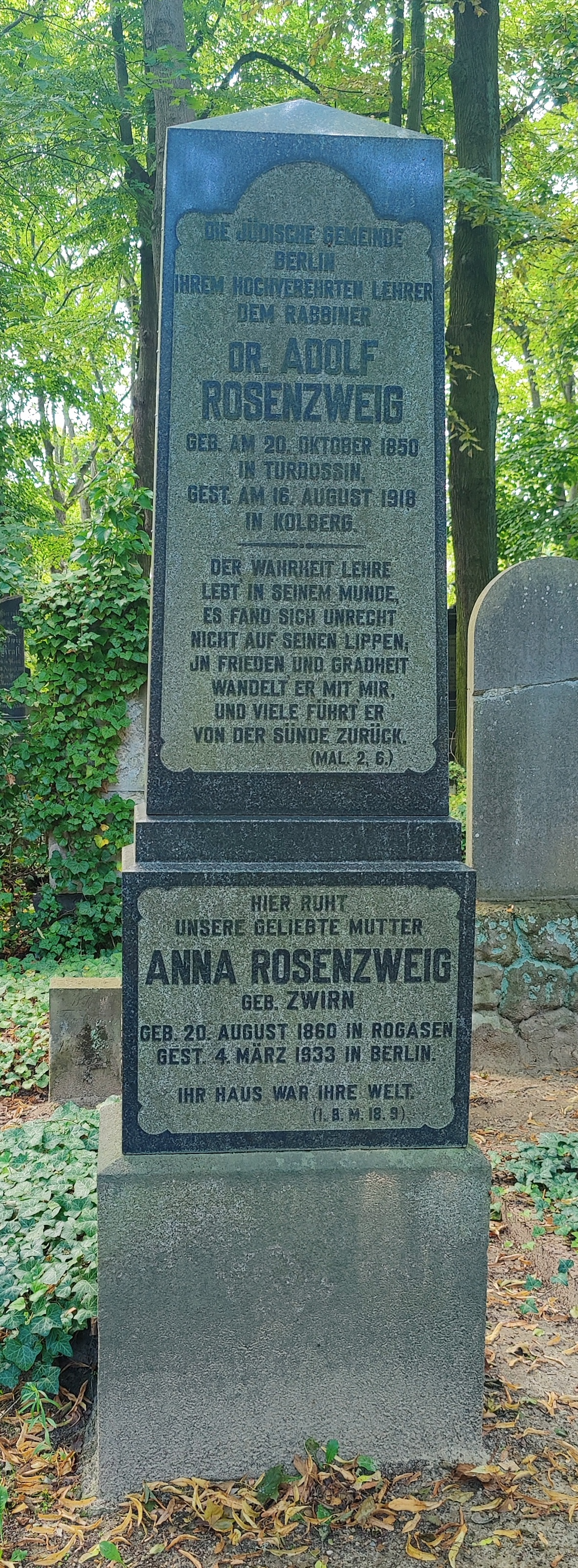
Grave of Adolf Rosenzweig and Anna Rosenzweig at the Jewish Cemetery Weißensee, Berlin

Rabbi Dr. Adolf Rosenzweig (October 20, 1850 – August 16, 1918) was a German moderate liberal rabbi and Biblical and Talmudic scholar. In his publications he dealt with historical and archaeological matters.

== Biography ==
Adolf Aharon Rosenzweig was born in Turdossin, Hungary. He studied at the gymnasium at Pest, later at the Yeshiva of Pressburg. After graduation he went to Berlin, where he studied philosophy and Oriental languages and literatures at the University of Berlin, and theology at the Hochschule für die Wissenschaft des Judentums. Finally he earned his PhD.

On October 20, 1874, he entered upon the rabbinate of Pasewalk, Province of Pomerania, whence he was called to Birnbaum, Posen. In 1879 he went to Teplitz, Bohemia, and in 1887 he accepted a rabbinate at the New Synagogue (Neue Synagoge) in Oranienburger Straße, Berlin, where he remained until his death in 1918. There he came to be known as an outstanding preacher. He was also a prolific author, writing on history and archaeology as well as religious subjects.

He was married to Anna Rosenzweig, née Zwirn (1860-1933). Rosenzweig died in 1918, at 68, and was buried at the Jewish Cemetery Weißensee, Berlin. On his gravestone was written: "The law of truth was in his mouth, and unrighteousness was not found in his lips" (Malachi 2:6).

== Family ==
Rosenzweig's son, Rabbi Dr. Arthur Rosenzweig (March 27, 1883, Teplitz – 1935, Prague), was a spiritual leader.

His daughter, Hedwig, married Rabbi Judah Bergmann (1874–1956) – Galician-born, studied in the Rabbinical Seminary in Vienna; rabbi in Berlin from 1908; emigrated to Palestine in 1933. They had 8 children. Their elder son, Ernst David Bergmann (October 18, 1903, Karlsruhe – 1975), was a professor of Organic Chemistry in the Hebrew University of Jerusalem (1954–1975), and often considered the father of the Israeli nuclear program. His brother, Felix Bergmann (August 17, 1908, Frankfurt – 2002, Israel), raised in Berlin, PhD in chemistry and MD from the University of Berlin in 1933; chair of Pharmacology in the Hebrew University of Jerusalem (1950–2002). Arthur Bergmann (born 1908) was a lawyer who defended Palestinian prisoners and initiated several humanitarian projects for blind Palestinian children. Theodor Bergmann (born March 7, 1916, in Berlin) is a professor of Agricultural Economy in the University of Hohenheim in Stuttgart since 1981.

Alfred Bergmann (born 1910) was a member of the German communist opposition (KPD-O) like his younger brothers Theodor and Josef. Alfred was forced to emigrate to Switzerland from where he was handed over to the German Gestapo in 1942 and murdered in prison. Josef Bergmann (born 1913), also a member of the German communist opposition, emigrated with his brother Theodor to Sweden and returned to Germany after WW II.

== Works ==
- Zur Einleitung in die Bücher Esra und Nehemia (Berlin, 1875)
- Zum Hundertsten Geburtstage des Nathan der Weise (Posen, 1878)
- I. Des Schofars Rufe und die drei Bücher des Lebens; II. Des Wächters Stimmen: zwei Predigten für Rosch Haschana und Jom Hakippurim (Magdeburg, 1879)
- Das Jahrhundert nach dem babylonischen Exile: mit besonderer Rücksicht auf die religiöse Entwicklung des Judentums, (Berlin, 1885)
- Künstler und Jugendbildner: eine pädagogische Parellele (Neuhaus, 1886)
- Der politische und religiöse Charakter des Flavius Josephus (Berlin, 1889).
- Jerusalem und Caesarea: ein historisches Essay mit besonderer Rücksicht auf die Bedeutung Caesarea’s für Judenthum und Christenthum (Berlin, 1890)
- Das Auge in Bibel und Talmud: ein Essay (Berlin, 1892)
- Geselligkeit und Geselligkeits-Freuden in Bibel und Talmud: ein Beitrag zur Culturgeschichte des Alterthums (Berlin, 1895)
- Kohelet’s Welt- und Lebensanschauung / Predigt von A.R. (Berlin, 1903)
- Kleidung und Schmuck im biblischen und talmudischen Schrifttum (Berlin, 1905)
- Die Al-tikri-Deutungen: ein Beitrag zur talmudischen Schriftdeutung (Breslau, 1911)

=== Other publications ===
- Wort des Dankes, gesprochen am 2. Tage des Pessah-Festes (5629): im Locale der Israelitischen Speise-Anstalt in Wien, Wien: Theilnehmern der Speise-Anstalt, 1869.
- Rede, gehalten am 11. August in der Neuen Synagoge bei der Feier von Leopold Zunz’ens hundertjährigem Geburtstage (Berlin, 1894)
- Des Gotteshauses Botschaft und Forderung: Rede gehalten am 4. Sept. 1898 bei der Einweihung der Synagoge des Synagogenvereins Moabit, Berlin: Moabit, 1898.
- Des Gotteshauses Bedeutung und Berechtigung: Weiherede, gehalten am 4. September 1904 bei der Einweihung der Gemeindesynagoge in der Rykestrasse (Berlin, 1904)
- In deinem Blut sollst du leben! Predigt und Gebet beim Trauergottesdienste für die Opfer der Judenverfolgungen in Russland am 10. Dez. 1905, in der Synagoge Ryke-Strasse 53, Berlin: L. Lamm, 1905.
