= Chicago Rabbinical Council =

US regional Orthodox rabbinical organization

- Founded: 1932
- Key People: Rabbi Sholem Y. Fishbane- Kashrus Administrator; Rabbi Moshe Moscowitz- Senior Rabbinic Coordinator
- Website: https://www.crcweb.org/

The Chicago Rabbinical Council (or cRc) is the largest regional Orthodox rabbinical organization in America, located in Chicago, Illinois. The cRc is a non-profit offering a wide variety of Jewish services, including kosher product supervision and kosher certification. Kosher certification (cRcKosher) is available around the world and throughout the year, including Passover supervision.

The cRc is also involved in community relations, funeral standards, legislative issues, youth education, and other activities benefiting the Jewish and general communities.

The cRc provides a beth din, a court of rabbis who are experts in Jewish law. In addition to dealing in the area of Jewish divorce, the Jewish court deals with Jewish adoption, conversion, certification of Jewish status, cases of mediation, and legal disputes.

The CRC's beth din and kashrus services are used by many other midwestern and south-central United States Jewish communities.

Rabbi Gedalia Dov Schwartz was the long-time Av Beit Din of the cRc. He died in December 2020. Since 2013, Rabbi Yona Reiss has been the Av Beit Din.

Rabbi Sholem Fishbane is the Director of Kashrus for the Chicago Rabbinical Council (cRc), as well as the Executive Director of the Associated Kashrus Organizations (AKO), an umbrella group of major kosher-certifying agencies.

The cRc maintains a list of "Acceptable Kashrus Agencies".
