= Eitan Rosenzweig =

Israeli artist (2002–2023)

- איתן רוזנצוויג
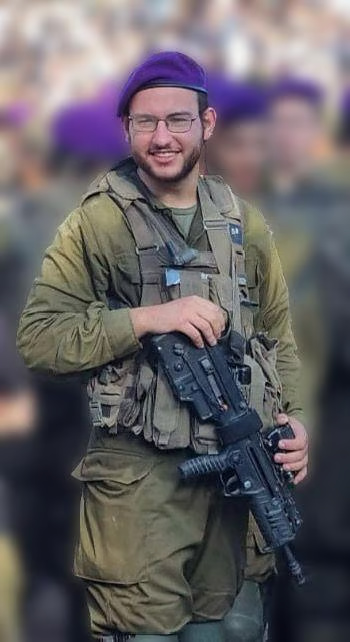
- Born: March 7, 2002; Alon Shvut, West Bank
- Died: November 22, 2023 (aged 21); Jabalya, Gaza Strip
- Education: Open University of Israel
- Military career
- Allegiance: Israel
- Branch: Israel Defense Forces
- Rank: Staff Sergeant
- Unit: Givati Brigade
- Conflicts: Gaza war

Eitan Rosenzweig (Hebrew: איתן רוזנצוויג) was an Israeli poet, visual artist and spoken word performer.

Rosenzweig died in Jabalya, Gaza, at the age of 21 during the Gaza war while serving in Israel Defense Forces.

== Biography ==
Rosenzweig was the eldest of five sons of Hagit and Uzi. He grew up in the Gush Etzion settlement of Alon Shvut. He completed high school at the Neve Shmuel Yeshiva in Efrat. He studied in the regional art major in Gush Etzion. His final work, which he created at the age of 18, "Kuma, Mei Aftzim and Kankantum", won him first place in a national competition and a scholarship for academic studies in art.

During his high school years, Rosenzweig displayed academic and artistic abilities. He completed a Bachelor of Arts in economics from the Open University along with his regular studies. His intellectual pursuits extended to various interests, including literature, history, and art. Unusually for someone from the Religious Zionist community, he also developed close ties with the Gur Hassidic group in Jerusalem. Rosenzweig was noted for his creative talents. His 12th-grade final project was a four-meter-long illustration depicting significant events in Jewish history. His school later announced plans to publish a collection of his poetry and artwork as a tribute to his legacy. He was one of three soldiers from the same graduating class at Naveh Shmuel Yeshiva High School who were killed in the Gaza offensive. The Rosh Yeshiva of Naveh Shmuel described him as "different, fascinating, very talented, very curious, a very interesting and rich person."

At the age of five, during a class trip, Rosenzweig discovered a stone that his father later identified as an Early Bronze Age female figurine of archaeological significance. The artefact was subsequently submitted to the Israel Antiquities Authority and is now displayed at the exhibition's entrance. It was an early example of Rosenzweig's interest in history, art, and cultural heritage, which he continued to explore later.

=== Death ===
In September 2023, Rosenzweig completed compulsory army service in the Shaked Battalion of the Givati Brigade. On October 7, as soon as Hamas attacked Israel, he was called back to the military reserve duty in his unit and was among the first forces to enter Gaza later in October, where he was killed in combat four weeks later.

== Exhibitions ==
- 2024 'Kuma: The Art of Eitan Rosenzweig'. Curated by Porat Solomon. Bible Lands Museum, Jerusalem, Israel.

At the request of Rosenzweig's parents, Uzi and Hagit Rosenzweig, the exhibition was inaugurated during the week between Remembrance Day and Independence Day in May. Due to the constrained timeline, the project relied on crowdfunding rather than conventional museum funding processes. The campaign garnered nearly NIS 60,000 from supporters across the globe.
