= Gedalia Dov Schwartz =

American-born Orthodox rabbi, author, legal jurist

Rabbi Gedalia Dov Schwartz
- Title: Rosh Beth Din

Personal life
- Born: Gedalia Dov Schwartz; January 24, 1925 Newark, New Jersey, U.S.
- Died: December 9, 2020 (aged 95) Chicago, Illinois, U.S.
- Children: Avraham Yishaya; Rivka Leah; Chaim Heschel
- Parent: Avraham
- Occupation: Rabbi, posek, scholar

Religious life
- Religion: Judaism
- Denomination: Orthodox

Jewish leader
- Organisation: Beth Din of America; Chicago Rabbinical Council
- Began: 1991
- Residence: Chicago, Illinois
- Semikhah: Rabbi Isaac Elchanan Theological Seminary

Gedalia Dov Schwartz (January 24, 1925 — December 9, 2020) was an eminent American Orthodox rabbi, scholar, and posek (halakhic authority) who lived in Chicago, Illinois. From 1991 to 2013, when he gave his position as Av Beth Din to Rabbi Yona Reiss, he was the av beis din (head of the rabbinical court) of both the Beth Din of America and the Chicago Rabbinical Council (cRc) as well as the rosh beth din (chief presiding judge) of the National Beth Din of the Rabbinical Council of America (RCA). He was also editor of HaDarom, the RCA Torah journal.

== Biography ==
Schwartz was born and raised in Newark, New Jersey, where he first studied Torah in his teenage years with Rabbi Yaakov Benzion Mendelson. He was a graduate of Yeshiva College and the Rabbi Isaac Elchanan Theological Seminary of Yeshiva University, where he received his rabbinic ordination. Following this ordination, he received a fellowship in the Institute of Advanced Rabbinic Research of Yeshiva University. Later he was awarded an honorary Doctor of Divinity degree. Rabbi Schwartz was honored with the Harav Yosef Dov Halevi Soloveitchik Aluf Torah Award, RIETS highest honor, at Yeshiva University's Chag Haseemicha convocation on March 23, 2014.

Before coming to Chicago in 1987, Schwartz was the rabbi of the Young Israel of Boro Park for 18 years, having earlier held pulpits in Rhode Island, New Jersey and Pennsylvania. He was a past president of the Mizrachi of Rhode Island and the RCA Philadelphia Region.

== Family ==
His father's name was Avraham. He married Rosalie (Rissia aka Shoshana) Poupko (d. 2009), with whom he had two sons and a daughter. In 2010, Schwartz married his second wife, Chana Sarah.

== Positions ==
Rabbi Schwartz's opinion was frequently sought by both Jewish and secular sources on issues such as conversion to Judaism, halakhic prenuptial agreements, kashering items for Passover, child abuse, and tattoos. In 2002 he was appointed as the head of a three-judge panel which examined cases of agunahs from the September 11 attacks, using DNA testing of post-mortem remains to verify the death of their husbands and allow them to remarry.

== Halakhic works ==
"Rabbi Schwartz was the first second-generation American rabbi to publish an original halachic [Jewish legal] work":

- Divrei Regesh
- Migdanos Eliezer
- Shaarei Gedulah

== Articles ==
- Comments on the New York State "Get Law"
- Halakhah and Minhag in Nusach Hatefillah (1990). Journal of Jewish Music and Liturgy 13, 7-10.
