= Gedaliah Silverstone =

Gedaliah Silverstone גדליה סילברסטון
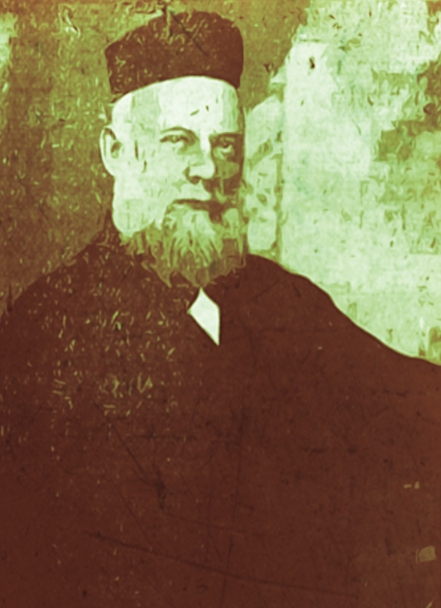

Personal life
- Born: 1871 Jasionowka, Russian Empire
- Died: 1944 (aged 72–73) Jerusalem, Mandatory Palestine

Religious life
- Religion: Judaism

Rabbi George (Gedaliah) Silverstone (1871 in Jasionowka, Russian Empire − July 22, 1944, in Jerusalem, Mandatory Palestine) was a prominent Orthodox rabbi and author in the United States at the beginning of the 20th century.

== Biography ==
Gedaliah ben Isiah Meir Zylbersztejn was born in 1871 in a shtetl in what is now Poland, where his maternal grandfather was the rabbi. At the age of two, he moved to Sakot, Kovno Governorate, where his father served as a rabbi. Young Gedaliah studied in the yeshivot in Ruzhany and Telz until 1891, when his father moved his family to Liverpool, England, where his name was anglicized. Silverstone was appointed the rabbi of the Belfast Hebrew Congregation in 1901. He visited America in 1905 to sell his books. The following year he decided to settle there because he could not support his large family in the United Kingdom and he was appointed rabbi of Ohev Sholom Congregation in Washington, D.C. He simultaneously served Kesher Israel Congregation in Georgetown after it was organized in 1911. Silverstone, a popular rabbi, was on good terms with his congregants.

As opposed to other American rabbis of the period, his publishing endeavors were supported by the community at large and he issued pamphlets of sermons on an almost annual basis. He had little difficulty in attracting benefactors to defray the publishing costs. Rabbi Dov Ber Manischewitz of Cincinnati and Noah (Nathan?) Musher were among his patrons and he repeatedly reported that his works were eagerly sought after by preachers. He generally published only sermons because he knew that most American Jews would not read his more scholarly works and because "many rabbis and sages from other countries write to me that my approach to Aggadah is the only one that can be used to influence the masses and lure them to their Father in heaven" (Mesamhai Lev, St. Louis, 1925, pp. 5–6). A vocal opponent of non-Orthodox synagogues, seminaries and rabbis, his sermons contain many polemical statements.

He later sent two of his sons to study in Jerusalem and, after visiting the Land of Israel (c. 1921), he announced that he would soon be immigrating there (Darke be-Kodesh, St. Louis, 1922, pp. 4, 6). Though he was unable to carry out his plans right away (Doresh Tov, St. Louis, 1923, p. 5), he did visit again within a year, this time together with Rabbi Zvi Hirsch Masliansky.

He finally settled in Jaffa by the end of the summer of 1923 and he was invited to preach a number of times at the Neveh Tzedek synagogue. A few months later, however, he was compelled to return to Washington because his wife, Rebecca, became ill. Attempts to settle in Safed in 1936 and in Jerusalem between 1938 and 1939 failed as well and he returned to America each time. He returned once more a few years later, this time remaining until his death in 1944. He was buried on the Mount of Olives.

=== Involvement in Jewish Society ===
Rabbi Silverstone was a vice president of the Agudath Harabbonim, a director of the Hebrew Sanitarium of Denver and the Hebrew Home for the Aged of Washington, D.C., and a member of B'nai B'rith. He also founded the first Talmud Torah in Washington, D.C., and many of his sermons refer to the poor state of Jewish education. An active Zionist, Silverstone attended the Sixth Zionist Congress in 1903 as a delegate from Belfast.

=== Family ===
Rabbi Silverstone was a grandson of Rabbi Elijah Abramsky, a nephew of Rabbi Chaim Zev Hirsh Braude, the father of Rabbi Dr. Harry Silverstone, a cousin to Rabbi Zelig Reuben Bengis; an in-law of Rabbi Gershom Ravinson of Cleveland, Ohio.
