= Greenberg & Lieberman =

American law firm

Coordinates: 38°55′8″N 77°4′12″W

- Industry: Law
- Founded: 1996; 30 years ago
- Founders: Michael Greenberg; Stevan Lieberman
- Headquarters: K Street, Washington, D.C., U.S.
- Services: Dealing with intellectual property, trademark infringements, domain names, virtual worlds, and software
- Number of employees: 9 (attorneys)
- Website: aplegal.com

Greenberg & Lieberman is a national and international law firm based in Washington, D.C. Established in 1996 by Michael Greenberg and Stevan Lieberman, the firm is known for its expertise in the technology-law areas of intellectual property, trademark infringements, domain names, virtual worlds, and software and was listed among 16 influential entities in the field of domain names in 2010. A "boutique law firm", Greenberg & Lieberman credited for being among the first in the world to begin generating a significant revenue and client base via online virtual worlds such as Second Life. Greenberg & Lieberman are also noted for their involvement with media law and military law.

== Background and areas of expertise ==
The Washington, D.C.-based national and international law firm Greenberg & Lieberman was established in 1996. The firm's headquarters are located on K Street NW in the K Street Corridor neighborhood in northwest Washington, D.C. The firm is registered to practice before the U.S. Patent and Trademark Office (USPTO).

The company has a particular focus on computer Internet law, copyrights and patent prosecution for small businesses. Since its establishment it has been recognized in the media and in the field of law for its expertise in intellectual property issues like domain and trademark law and reverse domain hijacking, and has been quoted in outlets such as the Washington Post, CNN, Associated Press, Kansas City Star and USA Today. A "boutique law firm", Greenberg & Lieberman is one of the first law firms in the world to venture into virtual world platforms such as Second Life and are amongst the virtual world's earning elite. Business News Express has described Greenberg & Lieberman as being "the rare law firm that possesses the resources of any large, international firm while maintaining individual, personalized contact between the firm's attorneys and its clients."

As part of Greenberg & Lieberman, Lieberman and Greenberg have filed almost 300 trademarks and over 560 patent files as of September 2011, serving over 20,000 clients. Many of their patent cases involve what is termed as a Utility patent, ranging from electronics and consumer goods to online business and software applications. A great deal of the work conducted by the firm centers around trademark disputes and they have been involved in legal cases from small businesses to global corporations such as Microsoft and Nike. The firm also offers to register trademarks formally for companies concerned with such issues to protect their brand names, logos or taglines by initiating research through screening the USPTO and the Internet to ensure that trademarks proposed are not too similar to any existing one and filing an application through the USPTO and Community Trade Mark (CTM) for European Union registration. Greenberg & Lieberman extend their work in trademarks to copyright infringement and defense and are adept at obtaining copyrights for computer software, web page designs, and screen displays and applying for copyright licensing contracts after evaluation. Since its establishment in 1996, the firm has been heavily involved with Internet and New Media law involving intellectual property and Uniform Domain-Name Dispute-Resolution Policy (UDRP) over domain names, which form a high percentage of their notable cases. The company is a proponent of technological development and in understanding the way online communication is evolving has branched out into virtual reality; they are credited with being among the first in the world to begin generating a significant revenue and client base via online virtual worlds such as Second Life. Greenberg & Lieberman also have a long history of preparing and negotiating contractual agreements from large corporations to small businesses and arranging licensing agreements.

Although they are best known for dealing with intellectual property issues, Greenberg & Lieberman have considerable experience dealing with military law issues, with attorneys on board such as Mike Lebowitz, an expert in military expression with firsthand Judge Advocate General's Corps (JAG) and combat experience. The company has expertise in military law issues such as the correction of military records, courts-martial defense, administrative separation defense, military expression and free-speech issues, AWOL concerns and whistleblowing.

== History ==
=== 1990s ===
After the establishment of Greenberg & Lieberman in 1996, one of their earliest notable cases was a successful motion to dismiss copyright infringement suit based on lack of personal jurisdiction in Evan K. Aidman v. Mark S. Nelson in 1999. In September 1999 the firm was involved in a motion to dismiss patent infringement matter in Molnlycke Health Care AB v. Dumex Medical Surgical, a notable case in Internet law.

=== 2000s ===
In 2000, the firm was involved in a trademark infringement matter in the National Jewish Defense League (JDL) v. Mordechai Levy case which ended in November 2002 when JDL chairman Irv Rubin died in suspicious circumstances in jail, and defended against copyright infringement in the Studio Martis, B.V. v. Joseph D. Wager Smith case. In 2001 Greenberg & Lieberman were involved in a trademark matter concerning Apache Boats v. Mark McManus and made a motion to dismiss in the Ramfan Corporation v. Super Vacuum Manufacturing case. In 2002, their involvement in the Ramsey v. Schutt, et al. case in the Maryland State Circuit Court for Charles County was influential in changing the rule in Maryland pertaining to what is necessary in a contract to obviate liability.

In 2003, Greenberg & Lieberman was involved in several UDRP or trademark infringement disputes such as Size, inc. v. Future Media Architects, Jensen Research v. Future Media Architects, Internet Development Corp v. Titlesoft, Internet Development Corp v. Senetek, Quantum Software Systems Ltd v. Future Media Architects, and a copyright infringement case, Future Media Architects v. Corey Richardson. In 2004, the firm continued to represent Future Media Architects and Internet Development Corporation in a series of disputes over UDRP and trademark infringements and other matters including representing Future Media Architects against Cool, Inc., QNX, Capital Networks PTY Ltd, Punto Verde, Murat Yikilmaz and Hay Napa International, and representing Internet Development Corporation against B.S.A. Corporation at Maryland District Court, Freightliner and Lactel.

In 2005, Greenberg & Lieberman were involved in the federal court and mediation in the Ariadne Genomics v. Stratagene California dispute. They were hired by Mastercard International Incorporated v. Priceless.com to settle a trademark matter. The firm also represented clients in several UDRP cases such as EuroChannel, Inc. v. Mrs. Jello, Weld Racing Inc. v. Web Development Group, Ltd., and RCS Recover Services v. John Laxton RL.COM, a case which was still ongoing as of September 2011. In 2006, they represented H2Ocean against Schmitt, April's After-Care and April's Attic in a case which was settled and was involved in UDRP disputes such as Equifax, inc v. The Tidewinds Group, Inc., Marchex v. Name Development Corp. and Thomas Weisel Partners Group, Inc. v. Tom Weisel House of Entertainment.

In 2007, Greenberg & Lieberman were hired by businessman Antonis Polemitis in a case against Ville de Paris, a Municipal Corporation of the city of Paris at the Virginia Eastern District Court involving the Lanham Act in which the client claimed tortious interference with contract and defamation. They also represented some major global firms in trademark matters such as Nike, Inc. v. Niyad Enterprise in California Central District Court, Microsoft v. Domain Source, Inc. and UDRP cases such as HSBC Finance Corp. v. Whois Privacy Protection Service, Inc. and Payday America, Inc. v. Xedoc Holding, SA.

In 2008, Greenberg & Lieberman were involved in a trademark/domain matter between Air China and Airchina.com and with LG Electronics USA and LG.com. They were also hired in a Second Life case between Chris Mead and Jakob Hyvarinen and in the UDRP cases of Blue Magic, Inc. v. Johns Creak Software Inc. and Genzyme Corporation v. Abadaba S.A. In 2009 they were again hired by Abadaba in a trademark matter against Microsoft and by 411 PAIN against Rafael Foss. They also represented dentist Alex McMillan, IV v. Tom Winkler case in a dispute over cybersquatting. The Alexandria Circuit Court ruled in favor of their client McMillan in a case which involved "a legal action initiated against a former employee charged with trademark infringement, trade secret violations, and domain theft." Lieberman has said, "2009 was most definitely an interesting year. We saw a large number of corporations, Verizon, Microsoft & Costco to just mention a few, taking the scorched earth point of view and suing everyone they can, even individuals and entities that no longer owned the alleged infringing domain names. This of course led to a large number of confidential settlements, which it can be assumed, were all rather painful to those paying to end the lawsuits."

=== 2010s ===
In 2010, Greenberg & Lieberman were involved in copyright cases in the John M. Smith vs Gosmile, Inc. dispute (settled), and began representing the Second Life firm Amaretto Ranch Breedables, LLC v. Ozimals, Inc. in a copyright infringement case which began in California Northern District Court on December 15, 2010, overlooked by judge Charles R. Breyer. The dispute involved a DMCA takedown notice dispute between companies that produce virtual animals on Second Life. Ozimals filed a DMCA takedown notice, claiming that Amaretto's horse infringed on their bunnies. Consequently, Amaretto filed for a temporary restraining order against Linden Research, the makers of Second Life. This was granted and held in effect as the case proceeded. The court denied Ozimal's motion on April 22, 2011, to dismiss Amaretto's UCL claim, but granted their motion to dismiss Amaretto's common law unfair competition claim for failure to state a claim. Greenberg & Lieberman were also active in the Warren Weitzman v. Lead Networks trademark case and were hired by ERGO Baby, Inc. v. Amaya Lucy in a UDRP case. In 2011, Greenberg & Lieberman were again hired by ERGO to represent them in another UDRP case against Henghao Zhan Jianzong and by Value Eyecare Network, Inc. in a dispute against Chengbiao Zhan. In April 2011, they lost a case representing Rabbi Shmuel Herzfeld of the Modern Orthodox Congregation Ohev Sholom in northwest Washington when U.S. District Court Judge Emmet G. Sullivan denied the request of the rabbi to have an upcoming local election rescheduled because it conflicted with the Jewish Passover.

== Attorneys ==
As of 2011, there are 9 attorneys working for the firm. Various members of the firm have testified to the US Congress as legal experts in fields such as intellectual property and military law.

=== Members ===
==== Michael Greenberg ====
Michael Greenberg is a legal expert in intellectual property law and patent law. Greenberg, a graduate of Union College and Franklin Pierce Law Center in 1993, has a background in the fields of biochemistry, economics, and sociology. After graduating from Union College, Greenberg undertook his Judicial Clerkship with the Honorable L. Leonard Ruben of the 6th Judicial Circuit of Maryland in 1992. Greenberg is a member of the Maryland State Bar Association and American Bar Association, the American Intellectual Property Law Association and the Licensing Executives Society. He served as Vice Chairman of the Intellectual Property Section of Montgomery County from 1998 to 2000 and the Chairman of the Montgomery County Maryland Bar's Intellectual Property and Technology Law Section from 2000 until 2003 and then from 2007 to the present.

==== Stevan Lieberman ====
Like Greenberg, co-founder Stevan Lieberman is a legal expert in intellectual property law and patent law. He is a graduate of Adelphi University and the David A. Clarke School of Law in 1994. Lieberman is noted for his pioneering work into virtual world platforms such as Second Life and has been described by CNN as "among the virtual world's earning elite". CNN reported that the American Bar Association and the Federal Bureau of Investigation (FBI) are among the organizations seeking assistance and legal guidance from Lieberman on issues relating to business practices in virtual worlds.

A recipient in September 2009 of the FountainBlue award for his work in virtual worlds, virtual real estate, and virtual tools, Lieberman is the co-founder and CEO of SpotOn3D.com, a 3D web development project designed for today's digital business. Lieberman is a member of the American Bar Association, American Intellectual Property Law Association and the Montgomery County Bar Association, amongst others.

=== Of counsel ===
==== John B. Anderson ====
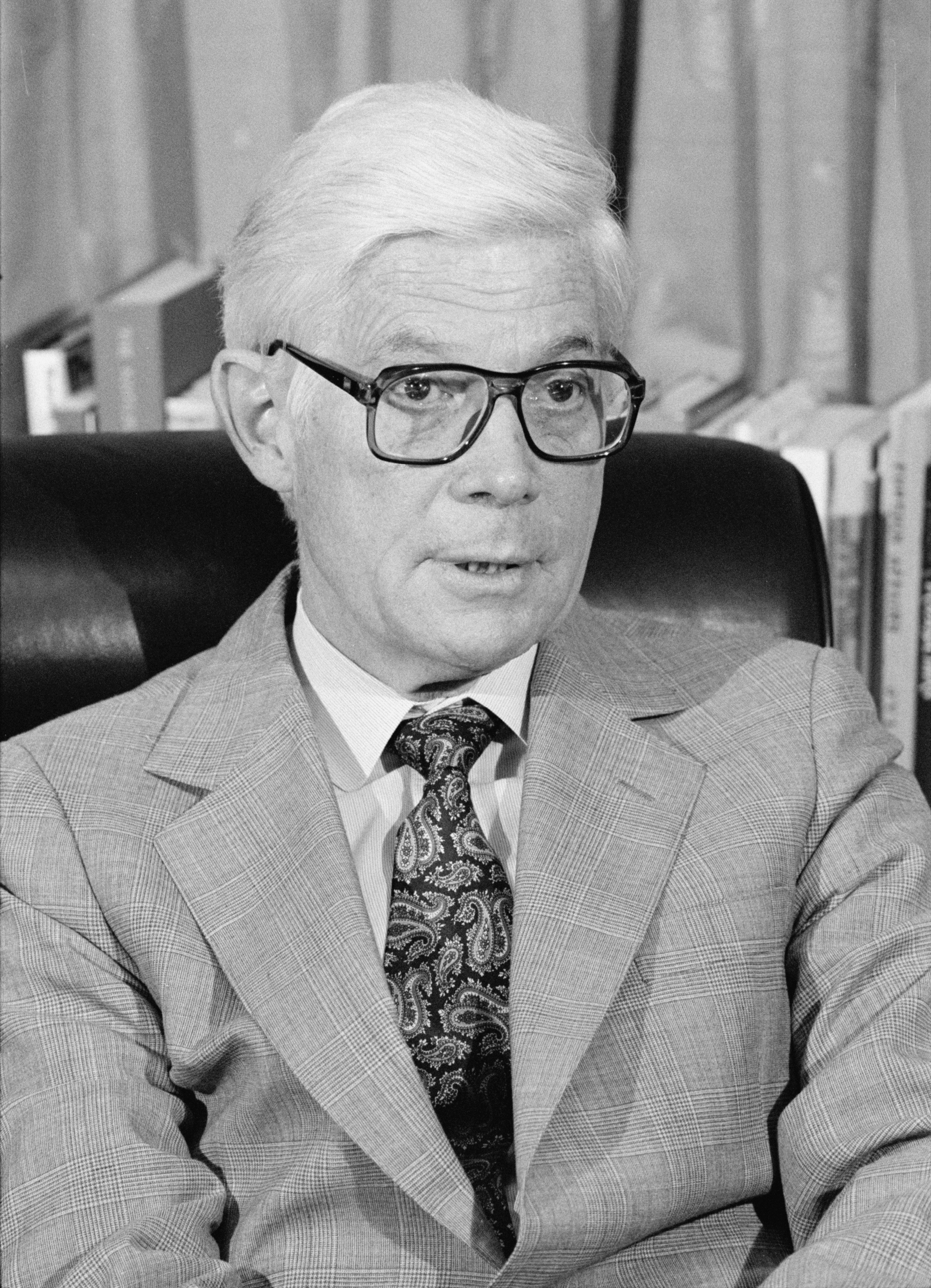
John B. Anderson

John B. Anderson, a graduate of the University of Illinois (1946) and Harvard University (1949), has had a notable career in law and politics. First elected to the U.S. House of Representatives in 1960, he has served ten terms as congressman. He was a presidential candidate during the 1980 presidential election for the Republican Party with 7 percent of the vote and was considered as a possible candidate for the 2000 presidential election for the Reform Party. He joined Greenberg & Lieberman when it was established in 1996. Anderson has also lectured for many years as a visiting professor at universities such as Stanford University, Duke University, University of Illinois College of Law, Brandeis University, Bryn Mawr College, Oregon State University, University of Massachusetts Amherst, and Nova Southeastern University.

==== Phillip S. Corwin ====
Phillip S. Corwin, a graduate of Cornell University and Boston College Law School is an expert in the law of electronic commerce and intellectual property and has considerable experience with financial services and cutting edge technology firms and knowledge of Internet law and IP litigation. He has served as Director and Counsel of Operations, Retail Banking, and Risk Management for the American Bankers Association and Legislative Counsel to the Independent Bankers Association of America. An employee of the United States Senate from 1976 to 1981, he was a principal spokesman for the American Bankers Association and has been invited to appear on numerous national television programs. He joined Greenberg & Lieberman in March 2011. An active member of the American Bar Association, he has also served as Chairman of the Business Law Section's Committee on Legislation and Washington Liaison for the Science and Technology Section, amongst others.

==== Mike Lebowitz ====
Mike Lebowitz, a graduate of Kent State University, Case Western Reserve University School of Law, is a legal expert in military law and military expression. He achieved success prior to joining the firm as an international journalist, working for the Jerusalem Post and the Cleveland News-Herald and gaining experience in media law and judicial reform whilst working in eastern Africa. A JAG officer with the Virginia Army National Guard, in 2005 and 2006 he served in Iraq as a paratrooper with the Pathfinder Company of the 101st Airborne Division. Lebowitz is a founder of the Modern Whig Party, a mainstream organization that was originally created in 2008 as an advocacy forum for military families and veterans, named by Time magazine in March 2010 as among the "top 10 most popular political movements worldwide". He regularly lectures on the subject of military law and intellectual property and has been asked to speak on issues such as military free speech and technology.

==== Howard A. Newman ====
Howard A. Newman, a graduate of the University of Florida, works at the intersection of litigation, business, and intellectual property with both a national and international practice with a niche area of Brasil. With an MBA and as a registered patent attorney, he has a license to practice in Washington, D.C., Florida, Maryland, and Oregon, and he is a member of various US District and Appellate Courts, including the US District Courts for the District of Columbia, Florida (Northern District), Florida (Southern District), Maryland, and Michigan (Western District) as well as the Fourth, Eleventh, and Federal Circuits, and the U.S. Supreme Court.

==== David Shaheen ====
David Shaheen, a graduate of the University of Notre Dame and George Washington University, has considerable experience in corporate and securities law, representing public and private companies in a wide range of fields such as telecommunications, real estate, hospitality and manufacturing. He began his legal career with the Securities and Exchange Commission and is also a partner of Burk & Reedy, LLP. Much of his work involves advising entrepreneurs and companies in corporate finance, shareholder and management concerns, employment and long-term business strategies. Shaheen is the Chairman of the Corporate Law Committee for the District of Columbia Bar Association and has also been presented as a candidate by the Bar Association's Election Committee to run for the position of President of the Bar Association. He is the author of several publications related to economic law and the co-author of the book Start a Business in Maryland, Virginia, or the District of Columbia.

==== Jonathan Westreich ====
Jonathan Westreich, a graduate of Oberlin College in 1988 in Philosophy and Political Theory, and the American University Washington College of Law, is an experienced litigator, with experience in State and Federal Court disputes over businesses, contract law, and intellectual property litigation.

=== Senior Attorney ===
==== Debora McCormick ====
Debora J. McCormick, a graduate of Guilford College (1969–1971), Appalachian State University (1976) and District of Columbia School of Law (1994), is an experienced litigator and specialist in trademark issues. She previously worked for Shaw Pittman, LLP and Banner & Witcoff. She has been licensed to practice in front of the U.S. Supreme Court since 2001.
