= Michael Greenberg (lawyer) =

- Education: Union College (BA); Franklin Pierce Law Center (JD)
- Occupation: Lawyer

Michael Greenberg is an American lawyer, regarded as a legal expert in intellectual property law and patent law. He is a partner of the Washington, D.C.–based law firm, Greenberg & Lieberman, with Stevan Lieberman, established in 1996. As part of the firm, Greenberg has been involved in hundreds of UDRP or trademark infringement disputes and is a well-regarded and experienced litigator, with particular expertise in patent infringement cases.

== Early life and background ==
Greenberg attended Union College in Schenectady, New York, where he graduated in 1990 with a Bachelor of Arts degree. He has a background in the fields of biochemistry, economics, and sociology. He later earned his Juris Doctor from Franklin Pierce Law Center in Concord, New Hampshire in May 1993. After graduating from Union College, Greenberg undertook his Judicial Clerkship, with the Honorable L. Leonard Ruben of the 6th Judicial Circuit of Maryland in 1992. After joining the Franklin Pierce Law Center, he gained experience in legal writing and research and was an issue editor for the IDEA: The Journal of Law and Technology from 1992 to 1993.

Greenberg is a member of the Maryland State Bar Association and American Bar Association, the American Intellectual Property Law Association and the Licensing Executives Society. He served as Vice Chairman of the Intellectual Property Section of Montgomery County from 1998 to 2000 and the Chairman of the Montgomery County Maryland Bar’s Intellectual Property and Technology Law Section from 2000 until 2003 and then from 2007 to the present. He also works as a legal lecturer for the Montgomery County Bar Association and lectures annually at the American University Law School.

== Career ==
Greenberg formed Washington, D.C.–based law firm, Greenberg & Lieberman, with Stevan Lieberman, also an expert in patent law and a pioneer in the technology-law areas of virtual worlds, domain names and software, in 1996. A national and an international firm, the company has a particular focus on computer Internet law and patent prosecution for small businesses. As of 2010, the firm has served over 20,000 clients.

As part of Greenberg & Lieberman, Greenberg has filed almost 300 trademarks and over 560 patent files as of September 2011. One of his earliest cases was a successful motion to dismiss copyright infringement suit based on lack of personal jurisdiction in Evan K. Aidman v. Mark S. Nelson in 1999. In September 1999 he was involved in a motion to dismiss patent infringement matter in Molnlycke Health Care AB v. Dumex Medical Surgical, a notable case in Internet law. In 2000 he was involved in a trademark infringement matter in the National Jewish Defense League (JDL) v. Mordechai Levy case which ended in November 2002 when JDL chairman Irv Rubin died in suspicious circumstances in jail, and defended against copyright infringement in the Studio Martis, B.V. v. Joseph D. Wager Smith case. In 2002, Greenberg and Lieberman's involvement in the Ramsey v. Schutt, et al. in the Maryland State Circuit Court for Charles County was influential in changing the rule in Maryland pertaining to what is necessary in a contract to obviate liability.

In 2003, Greenberg was involved in several UDRP or trademark infringement disputes such as Size, Inc. v. Future Media Architects, Jensen Research v. Future Media Architects, Internet Development Corp v. TitleSoft, Internet Development Corp v. Senetek, Quantum Software Systems Ltd v. Future Media Architects, and a copyright infringement case, Future Media Architects v. Corey Richardson. In 2004, the firm continued to represent Future Media Architects and Internet Development Corporation in a series of disputes over UDRP and trademark infringements and other matters including representing Future Media Architects against Cool, Inc., QNX, Capital Networks PTY Ltd, Punto Verde, Murat Yikilmaz and Hay Napa International, and representing Internet Development Corporation against B.S.A. Corporation at Maryland District Court, Freightliner and Lactel.

In 2005, Greenberg was involved in the federal court and mediation in the Ariadne Genomics v. Stratagene California dispute. His firm was hired by Mastercard International Incorporated v. Priceless.com to settle a trademark matter. In 2006, Greenberg was involved in UDRP disputes such as Equifax, inc v. The Tidewinds Group, Inc., Marchex v. Name Development Corp. and Thomas Weisel Partners Group, Inc. v. Tom Weisel House of Entertainment.

In 2007, Greenberg & Lieberman were hired by businessman Antonis Polemitis in a case against Ville de Paris, a Municipal Corporation of the city of Paris at the Virginia Eastern District Court involving the Lanham Act in which the client claimed tortious interference with contract and defamation. They also represented some major global firms in trademark matters such as Nike, Inc. v. Niyad Enterprise in California Central District Court, Microsoft v. Domain Source, Inc. and UDRP cases such as HSBC Finance Corp. v. Whois Privacy Protection Service, Inc..

In 2008, Greenberg was involved in a trademark/domain matter between Air China and Airchina.com and with LG Electronics USA and LG.com. He was also hired in a Second Life case between Chris Mead and Jakob Hyvarinen and in the UDRP Genzyme Corporation v. Abadaba S.A. case. In 2009 they again represented Abadaba in a trademark matter against Microsoft and by the Broward Rehab Center Inc. against Rafael Foss. Greenberg also represented dentist Alex McMillan, IV v. Tom Winkler case in a dispute over cybersquatting. The Alexandria Circuit Court ruled in favor of their client McMillan in a case which involved "a legal action initiated against a former employee charged with trademark infringement, trade secret violations, and domain theft."

In 2010, Greenberg was involved in copyright cases in the John M. Smith vs Gosmile, Inc. dispute (settled), and began representing the Second Life firm Amaretto Ranch Breedables, LLC v. Ozimals, Inc. in a copyright infringement case in California Northern District Court, overlooked by judge Charles R. Breyer. As of October 2011, the Amaretto case is still ongoing. He was also active in the Warren Weitzman v. Lead Networks trademark case and was hired by The ERGO Baby, Inc. v. Amaya Lucy in a UDRP case. In 2011, Greenberg & Lieberman were again hired by ERGO to represent them in another UDRP case against Henghao Zhan Jianzong. In April 2011, Greenberg's firm lost a case representing Rabbi Shmuel Herzfeld of the Modern Orthodox Ohev Sholom - The National Synagogue in northwest Washington when U.S. District Court Judge Emmet G. Sullivan denied the request of the rabbi to have an upcoming local election rescheduled because it conflicted with the Jewish Passover.
