= Ohev Sholom =

Ohev Sholom (or Ohave/Ohaveth Shalom/Sholem/Sholum) (Hebrew: אוֹהֵב שָׁלוֹם "Lover of Peace"), may refer to the following synagogues:

== Canada ==
- Congregation Beth Israel Ohev Sholem (Quebec City, Quebec)

== United States ==
- Ohev Sholem Synagogue (New London, Connecticut)
- Ohev Sholom Congregation (Washington, D.C.), formerly "Ohev Sholom - The National Synagogue"
- Ohev Sholom Talmud Torah Congregation of Olney (Olney, Maryland)
- Congregation Ohev Shalom (Marlboro, New Jersey)
- Ohave Shalom Synagogue (Woodridge, New York)
- Temple Ohev Sholom (Harrisburg, Pennsylvania)
- Congregation Ohev Shalom (Wallingford, Pennsylvania)
- Ohaveth Sholum Congregation, (Seattle, Washington)
- Ohev Sholom Temple (Huntington, West Virginia)
- Oheb Shalom Congregation (South Orange, New Jersey)
