= Stevan Lieberman =

American intellectual property and Internet lawyer (born 1965)

- Born: Stevan H. Lieberman; July 22, 1965 (age 61); Brooklyn, New York City, U.S.
- Education: Adelphi University (BA); David A. Clarke School of Law (JD)
- Occupation: Lawyer
- Employer: Greenberg & Lieberman
- Known for: Domain name law, digital asset escrow, virtual world law
- Title: Managing Attorney
- Website: aplegal.com

Stevan H. Lieberman (born July 22, 1965) is an American lawyer specializing in intellectual property, Internet law, domain name disputes, and digital asset transactions. He is the co-founder and managing attorney of the Washington, D.C. law firm Greenberg & Lieberman, established with Michael Greenberg in 1996, and the managing member of the firm's domain name and digital asset escrow service, EscrowDomains.

Lieberman has represented parties in hundreds of proceedings under the Uniform Domain-Name Dispute-Resolution Policy (UDRP) and in federal domain name and trademark litigation, and was among the first lawyers to build a practice within online virtual worlds such as Second Life, for which CNN described him as "among the virtual world's earning elite." In 2021 he led the attempted sale of the domain name Internet.com at a $35 million minimum bid.

== Early life and education ==
Lieberman was born in Brooklyn, New York City. He attended Bard College from 1983 to 1985 and Adelphi University in Garden City, New York, graduating in 1987 with a Bachelor of Arts with honors. He earned a certificate from the Strasbourg Institute of Human Rights at the University of Strasbourg in 1993 and a Juris Doctor from the District of Columbia School of Law (now the David A. Clarke School of Law) in May 1994, where he was a member of the law review.

Lieberman was admitted to the bar of Pennsylvania in 1994 (now retired status), the District of Columbia Bar in 1995 (Bar No. 448218), and the bar of Maryland in 2000. He is also admitted to practice before the United States District Court for the District of Maryland, the United States District Court for the District of Columbia, and the Supreme Court of the United States, where he has appeared as counsel of record.

== Career ==
=== Greenberg & Lieberman ===
Lieberman co-founded Greenberg & Lieberman with Michael Greenberg in 1996. The firm practices intellectual property, Internet, and domain name law and, as of 2010, had served more than 20,000 clients. In 2010 the firm was listed by DN Journal among sixteen influential entities in the domain name industry. The firm operates several service brands, including EscrowDomains (domain and business escrow), WilyFish (brand protection and enforcement), and DomainTheft.com (recovery of stolen domain names).

=== Domain name law ===
Lieberman has been described in trade coverage as one of the leading domain name lawyers in the world and has written and litigated on reverse domain name hijacking, including a 2016 finding of reverse domain name hijacking against the complainant in the WIPO proceeding over chinaready.com. He testified before the Congressional Budget Office in June 2000. DN Journal has noted his presence at the industry's principal conferences from the first T.R.A.F.F.I.C. conference in 2004 through NamesCon.

Among the firm's domain and trademark matters, Lieberman represented portfolio holders Future Media Architects and Internet Development Corporation in UDRP and federal proceedings, and handled matters involving Nike, Inc., Microsoft, Mastercard, Air China, LG Electronics, HSBC, Equifax, Genzyme, Thomas Weisel Partners, and Ergobaby.

In 2021, Lieberman was engaged to conduct the sale of Internet.com, one of the most valuable domain names in the domain aftermarket, through an auction with a $35 million minimum bid, with legal and escrow services provided by Greenberg & Lieberman and EscrowDomains. Nine statements of interest above the trigger price were received, but no sale closed during the auction window and the seller suspended the process to negotiate privately. The domain was subsequently licensed to an email service operator while sale discussions continued.

=== Escrow and digital asset transactions ===
Greenberg & Lieberman has provided domain name escrow services since 2002. In 2015 the firm acquired the online escrow application developed by Escrow Hill Limited, which automated much of the escrow process and allowed the firm, which had previously seldom handled transactions below $100,000, to accept transactions of any size. The service, operated as EscrowDomains (also Escrow.Domains), handles domain purchases, leases, and lease to own arrangements, as well as business and intellectual property asset transfers, and carries errors and omissions insurance and a $10 million crime policy. The firm also offers escrow for cryptocurrency and other digital assets. In 2021, Airbnb filed a UDRP complaint naming Lieberman and the firm as respondent for a domain name the firm was holding as escrow agent; the panel noted that the firm held the domain subject to an escrow agreement rather than as the party responsible for its transfer. In January 2026, cryptocurrency held in the firm's escrow wallets was stolen through a compromised credential. The firm filed suit in the United States District Court for the District of Maryland against unidentified defendants and, later, the operators of a cross-chain swap service, asserting claims under the Racketeer Influenced and Corrupt Organizations Act and for conversion, and obtained temporary restraining orders and third party discovery against cryptocurrency exchanges and service providers to trace the assets.

=== Virtual worlds ===
Lieberman was among the first lawyers to develop a client base through virtual worlds such as Second Life, where he practiced under the avatar name "Navets Potato." In 2007 CNN reported that the American Bar Association and the Federal Bureau of Investigation were among organizations seeking his guidance on business practices in virtual worlds. His virtual world practice has been discussed in legal ethics scholarship. He received a FountainBlue award in September 2009 for his work in virtual worlds and was co-founder and CEO of SpotOn3D, a 3D web development platform. He represented Amaretto Ranch Breedables in Amaretto Ranch Breedables, LLC v. Ozimals, Inc., a copyright and DMCA dispute between Second Life businesses in the United States District Court for the Northern District of California.

=== Other roles ===
Lieberman is a principal of DigitalCandy, Inc., an ICANN accredited domain name registrar (IANA registrar ID 3253). He previously served as general counsel to the ICANN Business Constituency.

== Notable cases ==
- Aidman v. Nelson (E.D. Pa. 1999): successful motion to dismiss a copyright infringement suit for lack of personal jurisdiction.
- Molnlycke Health Care AB v. Dumex Medical Surgical Products Ltd. (E.D. Pa. 1999): personal jurisdiction over Internet based activity, cited in treatises on Internet law and electronic commerce.
- Jewish Defense League v. Levy (2000 to 2002): trademark dispute that ended with the death of JDL chairman Irv Rubin.
- Polemitis v. Ville de Paris (E.D. Va. 2007): Lanham Act, tortious interference, and defamation action against the City of Paris on behalf of a domain name owner.
- McMillan v. Winkler (Alexandria Cir. Ct. 2009): judgment for the firm's client on trademark infringement, trade secret misappropriation, and domain theft by a former employee.
- Amaretto Ranch Breedables, LLC v. Ozimals, Inc. (N.D. Cal. 2010): copyright and DMCA dispute arising in Second Life.
- China Ready and Accredited Pty Ltd v. Weitzman (WIPO 2016): defense of the chinaready.com domain resulting in a finding of reverse domain name hijacking against the complainant.
- Right of the Dot, LLC v. Lizmi (Fla. Cir. Ct., Broward County, 2021): action on behalf of the auction house over the buyer's failure to pay for the domain names Bird.com and Fish.com.
- Herzfeld v. District of Columbia Board of Elections (D.D.C. 2011): unsuccessful request on behalf of Rabbi Shmuel Herzfeld to reschedule a District of Columbia election that conflicted with Passover.
- DTLD L.L.C. v. The Power Station Limited Partnership (U.S. 2026): petition for a writ of certiorari from the District of Columbia Court of Appeals, with Lieberman as counsel of record.
- Greenberg & Lieberman, LLC v. John Does 1-20 (D. Md. 2026): RICO and conversion action to trace and recover cryptocurrency stolen from the firm's escrow wallets.

== Professional memberships ==
Lieberman is a member of the American Bar Association, the American Intellectual Property Law Association, the Montgomery County Bar Association, for which he lectures on intellectual property, and the Montgomery County High Tech Committee.
