= Michael Greenberg =

Michael Greenberg may refer to:

- Michael Greenberg (economist) (1914–1992), scholar of Chinese economics and history
- Michael E. Greenberg (born 1954), American neuroscientist
- Michael Greenberg (writer) (born 1952), author of Hurry Down Sunshine
- Michael Greenberg (lawyer), American lawyer
- Mike Greenberg (born 1967), television show host
