= Quarterly Journal =

Quarterly Journal may refer to:

- AIPLA Quarterly Journal
- Quarterly Journal of Austrian Economics
- Quarterly Journal of Economics
- Quarterly Journal of Engineering Geology & Hydrogeology
- Quarterly Journal of Experimental Psychology
- Quarterly Journal of Mathematics
- Quarterly Journal of Medicine
- Quarterly Journal of Microscopical Science
- The Quarterly Journal of Pure and Applied Mathematics
- Quarterly Journal of Science
- Quarterly Journal of Speech
- Quarterly Journal of Studies on Alcohol
- Quarterly Journal of the Chemical Society
- Quarterly Journal of the Geological Society of London
- Quarterly Journal of the Royal Astronomical Society
- Quarterly Journal of the Royal Meteorological Society
- The Quarterly Journal, published by Personal Freedom Outreach, Christian organisation
