= Robert Lewin =

Robert Lewin may refer to:

- Robert Lewin (art dealer), art dealer and philanthropist
- Robert Lewin (chiropractor)
- Robert Lewin (screenwriter)
