= Ida G. Ruben =

American politician from Maryland (1929–2024)

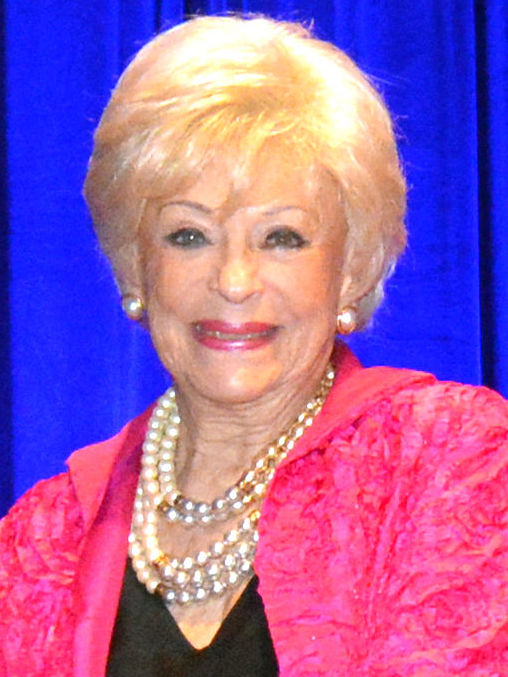
- Ruben in 2018

Member of the Maryland Senate from the 20th district
- In office January 14, 1987 – January 10, 2007
- Preceded by: Stewart W. Bainum Jr.
- Succeeded by: Jamie Raskin

Member of the Maryland House of Delegates from the 20th district
- In office January 8, 1975 – January 14, 1987
- Preceded by: Leonard Ruben
- Succeeded by: Peter Franchot

Personal details
- Born: January 7, 1929 Washington, D.C., U.S.
- Died: November 1, 2024 (aged 95) Bethesda, Maryland, U.S.
- Party: Democratic

Ida Gass Ruben (born Ida Fanny Gass; January 7, 1929 – November 1, 2024) was an American politician who served in the Maryland House of Delegates from the 20th district from 1975 to 1987 and in the Maryland Senate from the 20th district from 1987 to 2007.

Ida Fanny Gass was born in Washington on January 7, 1929, and married Leonard Ruben (died 2007) in 1948. They had four sons.

Ruben was first elected to the House of Delegates in 1974, filling a seat that had been vacated by her husband, who was appointed to a judgeship. She became a state senator in 1987 and served in the chamber for 20 years, rising to the position of president pro tem before losing her seat to Jamie Raskin in the 2006 election. During her time in office, she helped pass laws to protect victims of domestic violence, and to enforce child support payments.

Ruben died in Bethesda, Maryland, on November 1, 2024, at the age of 95. Following this, Governor Wes Moore ordered state flags to fly at half-staff in Ruben's honor.
