= John B. Anderson =

American lawyer and politician (1922–2017)

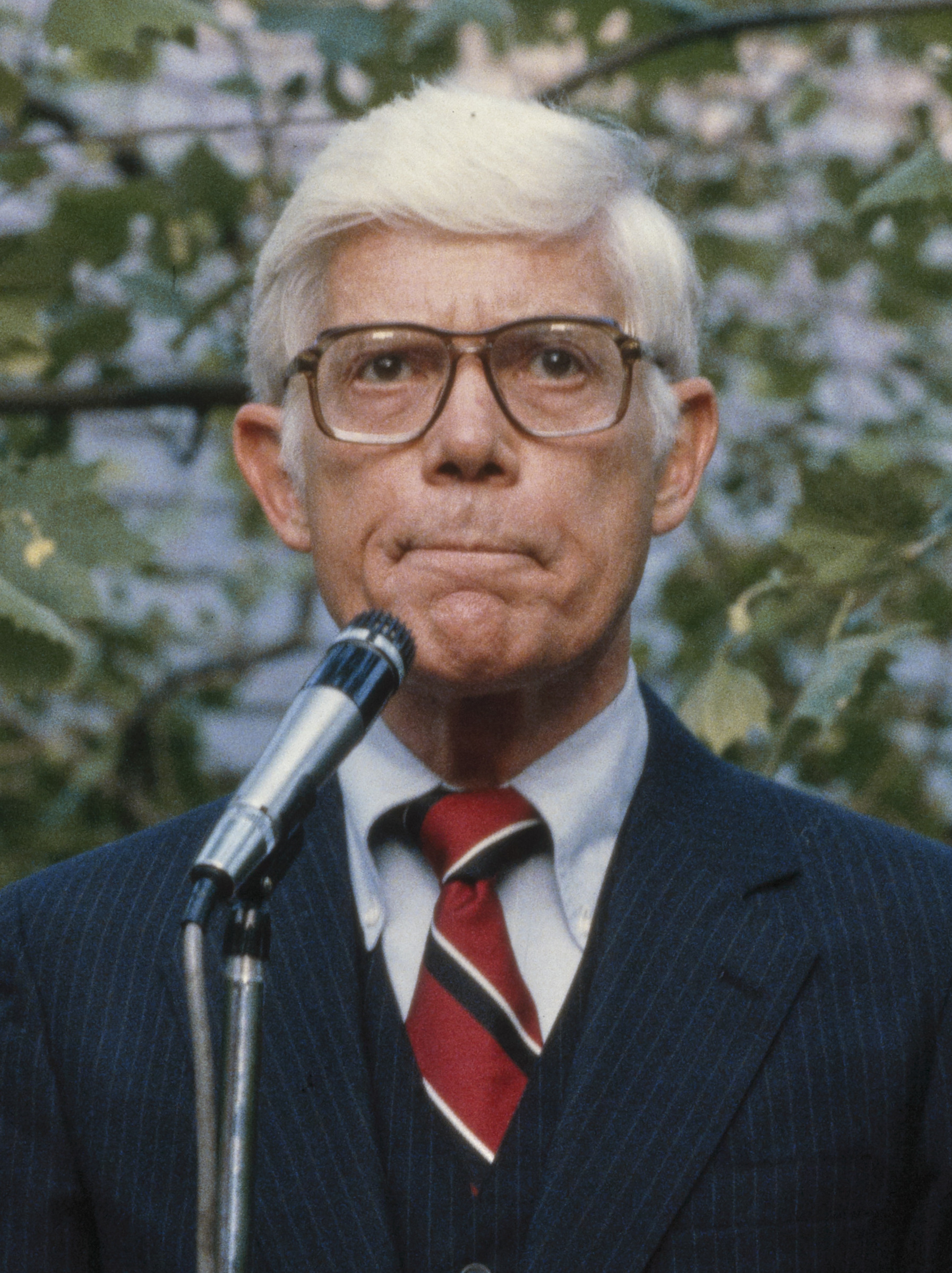
- Anderson in 1980

Chair of the House Republican Conference
- In office January 3, 1969 – June 8, 1979
- Leader: Gerald Ford; John Jacob Rhodes
- Preceded by: Melvin Laird
- Succeeded by: Samuel L. Devine

Member of the U.S. House of Representatives from Illinois's 16th district
- In office January 3, 1961 – January 3, 1981
- Preceded by: Leo E. Allen
- Succeeded by: Lynn M. Martin

Personal details
- Born: John Bayard Anderson; February 15, 1922 Rockford, Illinois, U.S.
- Died: December 3, 2017 (aged 95) Washington, D.C., U.S.
- Resting place: Arlington National Cemetery
- Party: Republican (before 1980); Independent (1980–2017)
- Spouse: Keke Machakos (m. 1953)
- Children: 5
- Education: University of Illinois, Urbana-Champaign (BA, JD); Harvard University (LLM)

Military service
- Allegiance: United States
- Branch/service: United States Army
- Years of service: 1943–1945
- Rank: Staff Sergeant
- Battles/wars: World War II

John Bayard Anderson (February 15, 1922 – December 3, 2017) was an American lawyer and politician who served in the United States House of Representatives from 1961 to 1981, representing Illinois's 16th congressional district. Initially a member of the Republican Party, he also served as the Chairman of the House Republican Conference from 1969 until 1979. In 1980, he ran an independent presidential campaign, receiving 6.6% of the popular vote.

Born in Rockford, Illinois, Anderson practiced law after serving in the Army during World War II. After a stint in the United States Foreign Service, he won election as the State's Attorney for Winnebago County, Illinois. He won election to the House of Representatives in 1960 in a strongly Republican district in Illinois, and served ten terms in the House until he resigned in 1980. Initially one of the most conservative members of the House, Anderson's views moderated during the 1960s, particularly regarding social issues. During his tenure in the House, he became chairman of the House Republican Conference in 1969 and remained in that position until 1979. He strongly criticized the Vietnam War as well as President Richard Nixon's actions during the Watergate scandal.

Anderson entered the 1980 Republican presidential primaries, introducing his signature campaign proposal of raising the gas tax while cutting Social Security taxes. Anderson established himself as a contender for the nomination in the early primaries but eventually dropped out of the Republican race, choosing to pursue an independent campaign for president. In the election, he finished third behind Republican nominee Ronald Reagan and Democratic President Jimmy Carter. He won support among Democrats who became disillusioned with Carter, as well as Rockefeller Republicans, independents, liberal intellectuals, and college students.

After the 1980 election, he resumed his legal career and helped found FairVote, an organization that advocates electoral reform, including an instant-runoff voting system. He also won a lawsuit against the state of Ohio, Anderson v. Celebrezze, in which the Supreme Court struck down early filing deadlines for independent candidates. Anderson served as a visiting professor at numerous universities and was on the boards of several organizations. He died at the age of 95 in December 2017.

== Early life and career ==
John Bayard Anderson was born in Rockford, Illinois, where he grew up, the son of Mabel Edna (née Ring) and Ernest Albin Anderson. His father was a Swedish immigrant, as were his maternal grandparents. His father was born in 1885 in Eriksberg parish, Västergötland.

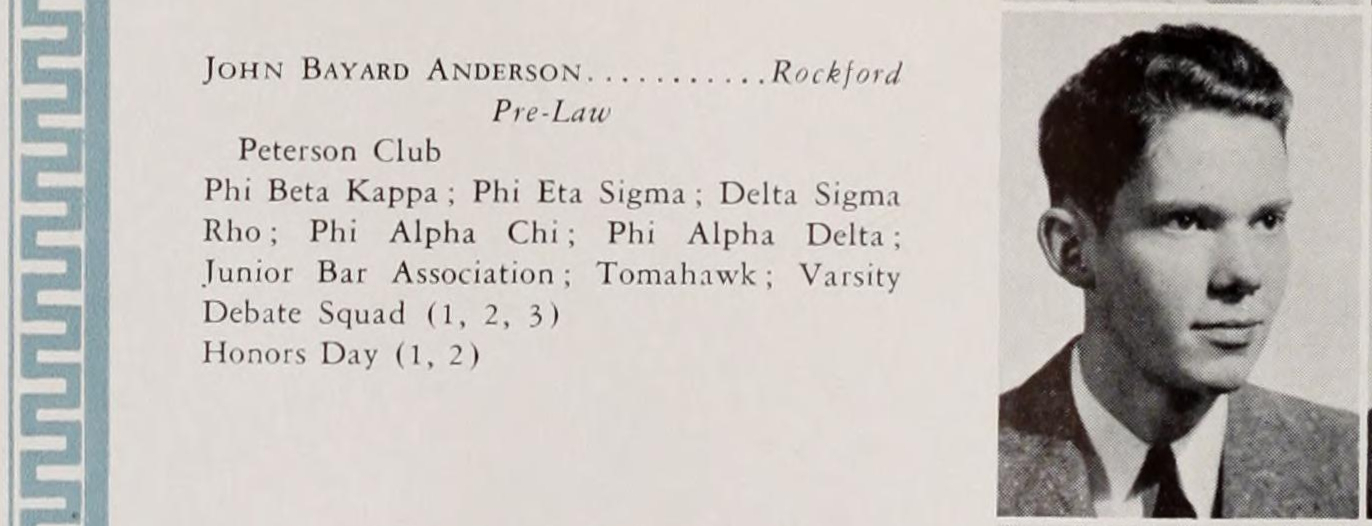
Anderson in the University of Illinois's 1942 yearbook

In his youth, he worked in his family's grocery store. He graduated as the valedictorian of his class (1939) at Rockford Central High School. He graduated from the University of Illinois at Urbana–Champaign in 1942, and started law school; his education was interrupted by World War II. He enlisted in the Army in 1943, and served as a staff sergeant in the U.S. Field Artillery in France and Germany until the end of the war, receiving four service stars. After the war, Anderson returned to complete his education, earning a Juris Doctor (J.D.) from the University of Illinois College of Law in 1946.

Anderson was admitted to the Illinois bar the same year, and practiced law in Rockford. Soon after, he moved east to attend Harvard Law School, obtaining a Master of Laws (LL.M.) in 1949. His LL.M. thesis was entitled, "A historical prologue to federal jurisdiction." While at Harvard, he served on the faculty of Northeastern University School of Law in Boston. In another brief return to Rockford, Anderson practiced at the law firm Large, Reno & Zahm (now Reno & Zahm LLP). Thereafter, Anderson joined the Foreign Service. From 1952 to 1955, he served in Berlin, as the Economic Reporting Officer in the Eastern Affairs Division, as an adviser on the staff of the United States High Commissioner for Germany. At the end of his tour, he left the foreign service and once again returned to the practice of law in Rockford.

== Early political career ==
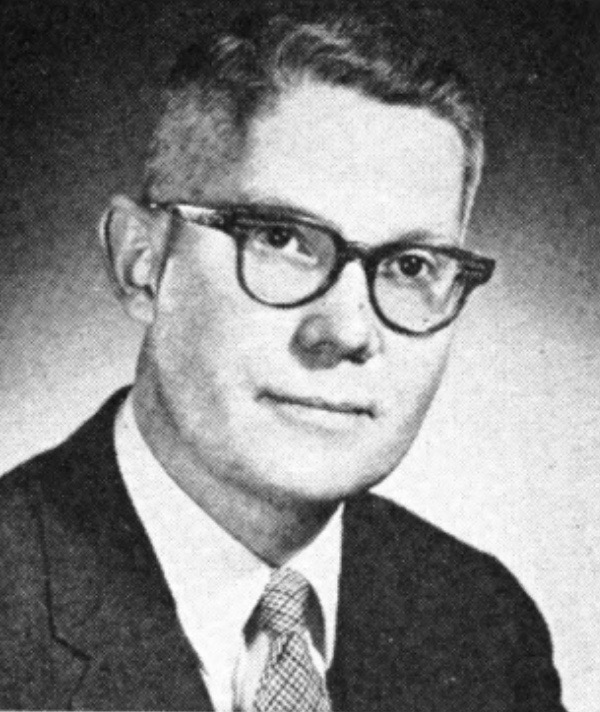
Anderson in 1965 during the 89th Congress

Soon after his return, Anderson was approached about running for public office. In 1956, Anderson was elected State's Attorney in Winnebago County, Illinois, first winning a four-person race in the April primary by 1,330 votes and then the general election in November by 11,456 votes. After serving for one term, he was ready to leave that office when the local congressman, 28-year incumbent Leo E. Allen, announced his retirement. Anderson joined the Republican primary for Allen's 16th District seat—the real contest in this then-solidly Republican district based in Rockford and stretching across the state's northwest corner. He won a five-way primary in April (by 5,900 votes) in April and then the general election in November (by 45,000 votes). He served in the United States House of Representatives for ten terms, from 1961 to 1981.

Initially, Anderson was among the most conservative members of the Republican caucus. Three times (in 1961, 1963, and 1965) in his early terms as a Congressman, Anderson introduced a constitutional amendment to attempt to "recognize the law and authority of Jesus Christ" over the United States. The bills died quietly but later came back to haunt Anderson in his presidential candidacy. Anderson voted in favor of the Civil Rights Acts of 1964 and 1968, as well as the Twenty-fourth Amendment to the United States Constitution and the Voting Rights Act of 1965.

Initially supportive of Barry Goldwater's candidacy for president in 1964 and believing Goldwater to be an "honest, sincere man", Anderson came to believe that most of his ideas would not work on a national scale, and described Lyndon B. Johnson's victory over Goldwater in the 1964 election as a vote for moderation, believing that the Republican Party needed to go in a moderate direction. Other factors such as attending the funerals of Andrew Goodman, Michael Schwerner, and James Chaney, as well as the street riots happening in America at that point, led to Anderson shift from the right to the left on social issues, although his fiscal positions largely remained conservative. The riots led Anderson to vote in favor of the Housing and Urban Development Act of 1968.

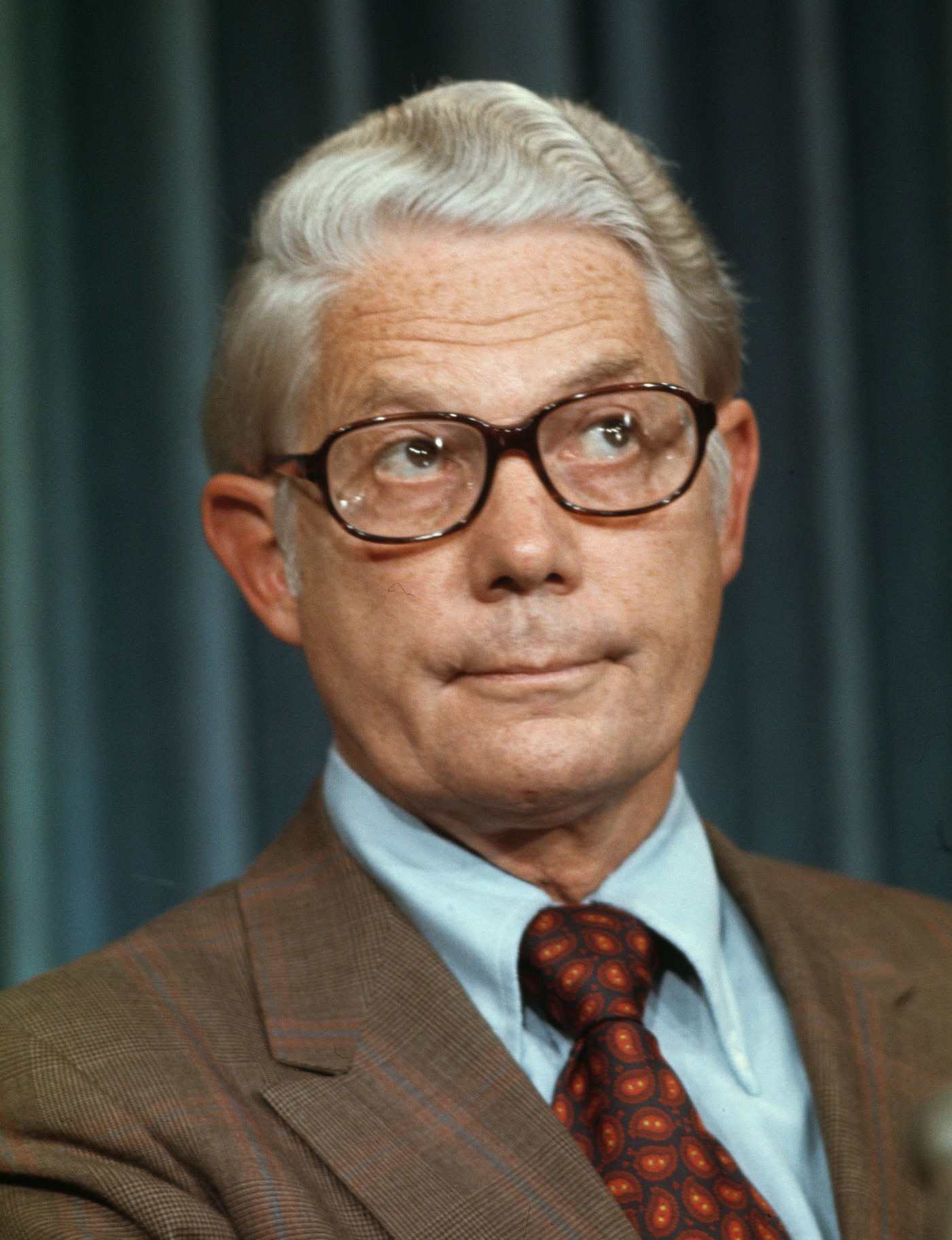
Anderson in 1974

In 1964, Anderson won appointment to a seat on the powerful Rules Committee. In 1969, he became Chairman of the House Republican Conference, the number three position in the House Republican hierarchy in what was (at that time) the minority party. Anderson increasingly found himself at odds with conservatives in his home district and other members of the House. He was not always a faithful supporter of the Republican agenda, despite his high rank in the Republican caucus. He was very critical of the Vietnam War, and was a very controversial critic of Richard Nixon during Watergate. In 1974, despite his criticism of Nixon, the strong anti-Republican tide in that year's election held him to 55% of the vote, what would be the lowest percentage of his career. Anderson described Nixon as a "man of great duplicity".

His spot as the chairman of the House Republican Committee was challenged three times after his election and, when Gerald Ford was defeated in the 1976 presidential campaign, Anderson lost a key ally in Washington. In 1970 and 1972, Anderson had a Democratic challenger in Rockford Professor John E. Devine. In both years, Anderson defeated Devine by a wide margin. In late 1977, a fundamentalist television minister from Rockford, Don Lyon, announced that he would challenge Anderson in the Republican primary. It was a contentious campaign, where Lyon, with his experience before the camera, proved to be a formidable candidate. Lyon raised a great deal of money, won backing from many conservatives in the community and party, and put quite a scare into the Anderson team. Though Anderson was a leader in the House and the campaign commanded national attention, Anderson won the primary by 16% of the vote. Anderson was aided in this campaign by strong newspaper endorsements and crossover support from independents and Democrats.

== 1980 presidential campaign ==
=== Early campaign ===
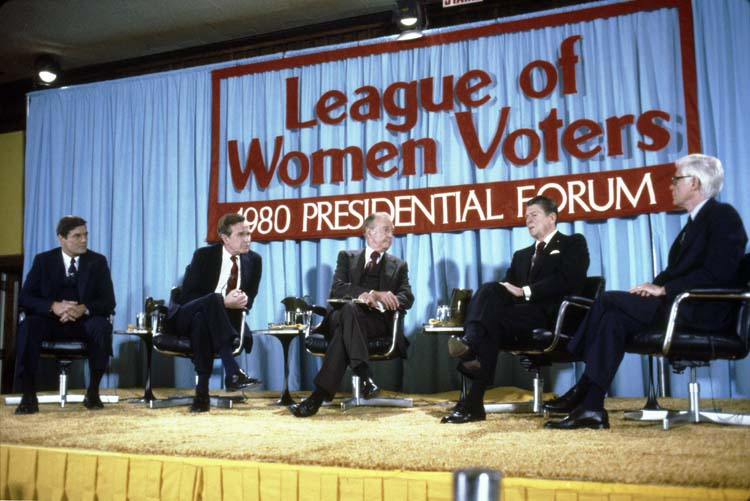
Anderson (far right) in a League of Women Voters-sponsored presidential forum alongside fellow Republican candidates, March 13, 1980

In 1978, Anderson formed a presidential campaign exploratory committee, finding little public or media interest. In late April 1979, Anderson made the decision to enter the Republican primary, joining a field that included Ronald Reagan, Bob Dole, John Connally, Howard Baker, George H. W. Bush, and the perennial candidate Harold Stassen. Within the last weeks of 1979, Anderson introduced his signature campaign proposal, advocating that a 50-cent a gallon gas tax be enacted with a corresponding 50% reduction in Social Security taxes. Anderson built state campaigns in four targeted states—New Hampshire, Massachusetts, Illinois, and Wisconsin. He won some political support among Republicans, picking up endorsements along the way that helped legitimize him in the race. He began to build support among media elites, who appreciated his articulateness, straightforward manner, moderate positions, and his refusal to walk down the conservative path that all of the other Republicans were traveling.

Anderson often referred to his candidacy as "a campaign of ideas". He supported tax credits for businesses' research-and-development budgets, which he believed would increase American productivity; he also supported increasing funding for research at universities. He supported lowering interest rates, antitrust action, conservation, environmental protection and limiting oil companies from absorbing small businesses through legislation. He opposed Ronald Reagan's proposal to cut taxes broadly, which he feared would increase the national debt and the inflation rate (which was very high at the time of the campaign), believing it to be "Coolidge-era economics". He also supported a tax on gasoline to reduce dependence on foreign oil. He proposed a one-year corporate surtax and a 10% tariff on oil imports, opposed wage and price controls, and was supportive of a health care plan for insurance against catastrophic illness. He supported the Equal Rights Amendment, gay rights and abortion rights generally; he also touted his perfect record of having supported all civil rights legislation since 1960. He opposed the requirement for registration for the military draft, which Jimmy Carter had reinstated. This made him appealing to many liberal college students who were dissatisfied with Carter. However, he also voiced support for a strong, flexible military and support for NATO against the USSR, as well as several other positions associated with Republicans, including deregulation of some industries such as natural gas and oil prices, and a balanced budget to be achieved mainly by reductions in government spending.

=== Republican primary ===
On January 5, 1980, in the Republican candidates' debate in Des Moines, Iowa, unlike the other candidates, Anderson said lowering taxes, increasing defense spending, and balancing the budget were an impossible combination. In a stirring summation, Anderson invoked his father's immigration to the United States and said that Americans would have to make sacrifices "for a better tomorrow." For the next week, Anderson's name and face were all over the national news programs, in newspapers, and in national news magazines. Anderson spent less than $2000 in Iowa, but he finished with 4.3% of the vote. The television networks were covering the event, portraying Anderson to a national audience as a man of character and principle. When the voters in New Hampshire went to the polls, Anderson again exceeded the expectations, finishing fourth with just under 10% of the vote.

Anderson was declared the winner in both Massachusetts and Vermont by the Associated Press, but the following morning ended up losing both primaries by a slim margin. In Massachusetts, he lost to George Bush by 0.3% and in Vermont he lost to Reagan by 690 votes. Anderson arrived in Illinois following the New England primaries and had a lead in the state polls, but his Illinois campaign struggled despite endorsements from the state's two largest newspapers. Reagan defeated him, 48% to 37%. Anderson carried Chicago and Rockford, the state's two largest cities at the time, but he lost in the more conservative southern section of the state. The next week, there was a primary in Connecticut, which (while Anderson was on the ballot) his team had chosen not to campaign actively in. He finished third in Connecticut with 22% of the vote, and it seemed to most observers like any other loss, whether Anderson said he was competing or not. Next was Wisconsin, and this was thought to be Anderson's best chance for victory, but he again finished third, winning 27% of the vote.

=== Independent campaign ===
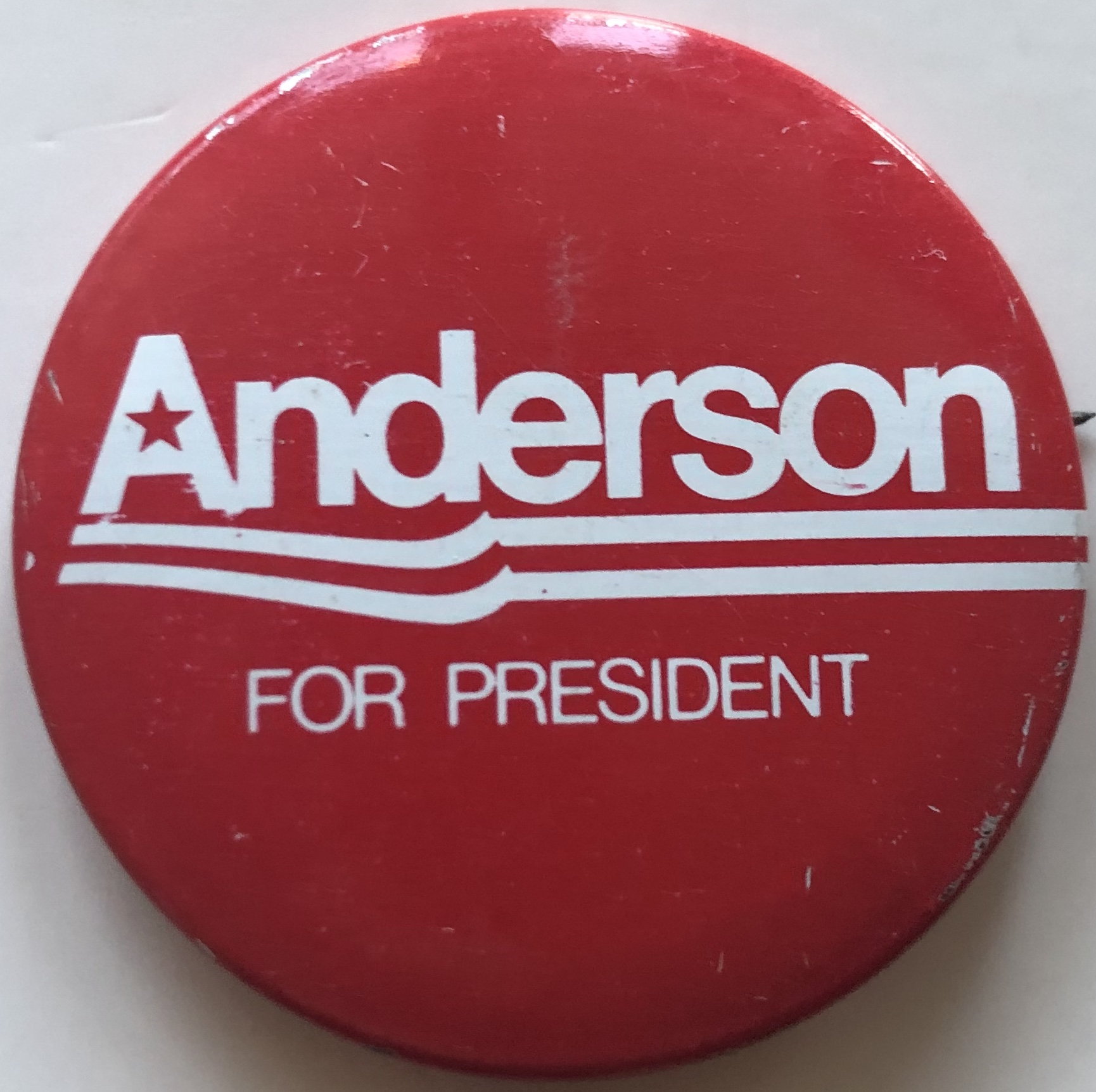
A campaign button for Anderson's independent campaign

The Republican platform failed to endorse the Equal Rights Amendment or support extension of time for its ratification. Anderson was a strong supporter of both. Pollsters were finding that Anderson was much more popular across the country with all voters than he was in the Republican primary states. Without any campaigning, he was running at 22% nationally in a three-way race. Anderson's personal aide and confidant, Tom Wartowski, encouraged him to remain in the Republican Party. Anderson faced a huge number of obstacles as a non-major party candidate: having to qualify for 51 ballots (which the major parties appeared on automatically), having to raise money to run a campaign (the major parties received close to $30 million in government money for their campaigns), having to win national coverage, having to build a campaign overnight, and having to find a suitable running mate among them. He built a new campaign team, qualified for every ballot, raised a great deal of money, and rose in the polls to as high as 26% in one Gallup poll.

However, in the summer of 1980, he had an overseas campaign tour to show his foreign policy credentials and it took a drubbing on national television. The major parties, particularly the Republicans, basked in the spotlight of their national conventions where Anderson was left out of the coverage. Anderson made an appearance with Ted Kennedy and it, too, was a huge error. By the third week of August he was in the 13–15% range in the polls. A critical issue for Anderson was appearing in the fall presidential debates after the League of Women Voters invited him to appear due to popular interest in his candidacy, although he was only polling 12% at that time. In late August, he named Patrick Lucey, the former two-term Democratic Governor of Wisconsin and Ambassador to Mexico as his running mate. Late in August, Anderson released a 317-page comprehensive platform, under the banner of the National Unity Party, that was very well received. In early September, a court challenge to Federal Election Campaign Act was successful and Anderson qualified for post-election public funding. Also, Anderson submitted his petitions for his fifty-first ballot. Then, the League ruled that the polls showed that he had met the qualification threshold and said he would appear in the debates.

=== Fall campaign ===
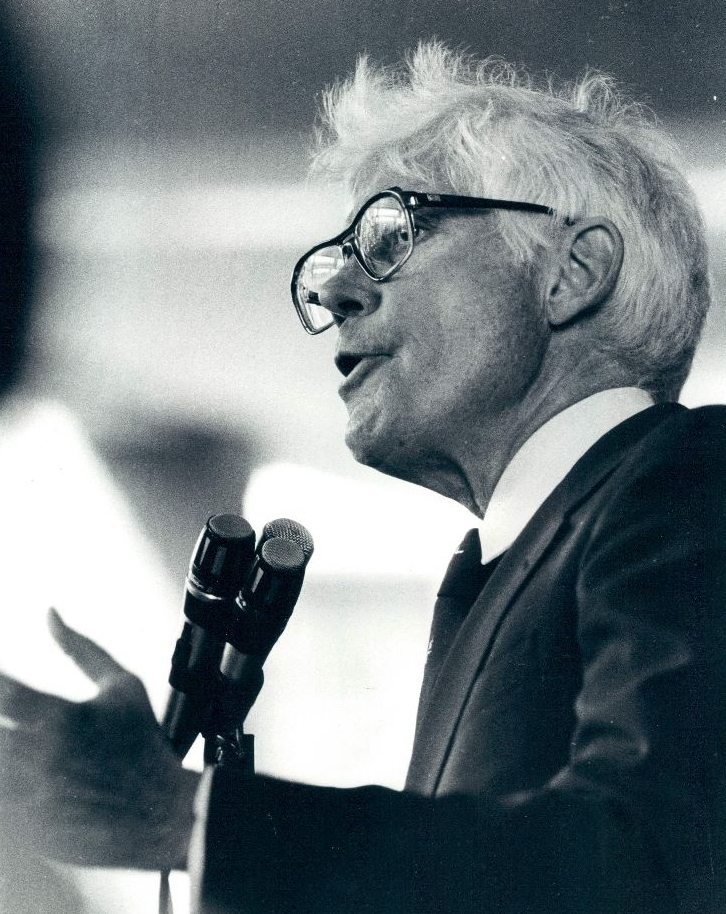
Anderson speaking to students at the University of Michigan, September 3, 1980

Carter said that he would not appear on stage with Anderson, and sat out the debate, which hurt the President in the eyes of voters. Reagan and Anderson had a debate in Baltimore on September 21, 1980. Anderson did well, and polls showed he won a modest debate victory over Reagan, but Reagan, who had been portrayed by Carter throughout the campaign as something of a warmonger, was seen as a reasonable candidate who carried himself well in the debate. The debate was Anderson's big opportunity as he needed a break-out performance, but what he got was a modest victory. In the following weeks, Anderson slowly faded out of the picture with his support dropping from 16% to 10–12% in the first half of October. By the end of the month, Reagan debated Carter alone, but CNN attempted to let Anderson participate in the 2nd debate by tape delay. Daniel Schorr asked Anderson the questions from the Carter-Reagan debate, and then CNN interspersed Anderson's live answers with tape delayed responses from Carter and Reagan.

Anderson's support continued to fade down to 5%, although rose up to 8% just before election day. Although Reagan would win a sizable victory, the polls showed the two major party candidates closer (Gallup's final poll was 47–44–8 going into the election and it was clear that many would-be Anderson supporters had been pulled away by Carter and Reagan. In the end, Anderson finished with 6.6% of the vote. Most of Anderson's support came from those Liberal Republicans who were suspicious of, or even hostile to, Reagan's conservative record. Many prominent intellectuals, including All in the Family creator Norman Lear, and the editors of the liberal magazine The New Republic, also endorsed the Anderson campaign. Cartoonist Garry Trudeau's Doonesbury ran several strips sympathetic to the Anderson campaign. Former First Lady Jacqueline Kennedy Onassis, actor Paul Newman, and historian Arthur M. Schlesinger Jr. also supported Anderson.

Although the Carter campaign feared Anderson could be a spoiler, Anderson's campaign turned out to be "simply another option" for frustrated voters who had already decided not to back Carter for another term. Polls found that around 37% of Anderson voters favored Reagan as their second choice over Carter. Anderson did not carry a single precinct in the country. Anderson's finish was still the best showing for a third-party candidate since George Wallace's 14% in 1968 and stands as the seventh-best for any such candidate since the Civil War (trailing James B. Weaver's 8.5% in 1892, Theodore Roosevelt's 27% in 1912, Robert La Follette's 17% in 1924, Wallace, and Ross Perot's 19% and 8% in 1992 and 1996, respectively). He pursued Ohio's refusal to provide ballot access to the U.S. Supreme Court and won 5–4 in Anderson v. Celebrezze. His inability to make headway against the de facto two-party system as an independent in that election would later lead him to become an advocate of instant-runoff voting, helping to found FairVote in 1992.

== Later career ==
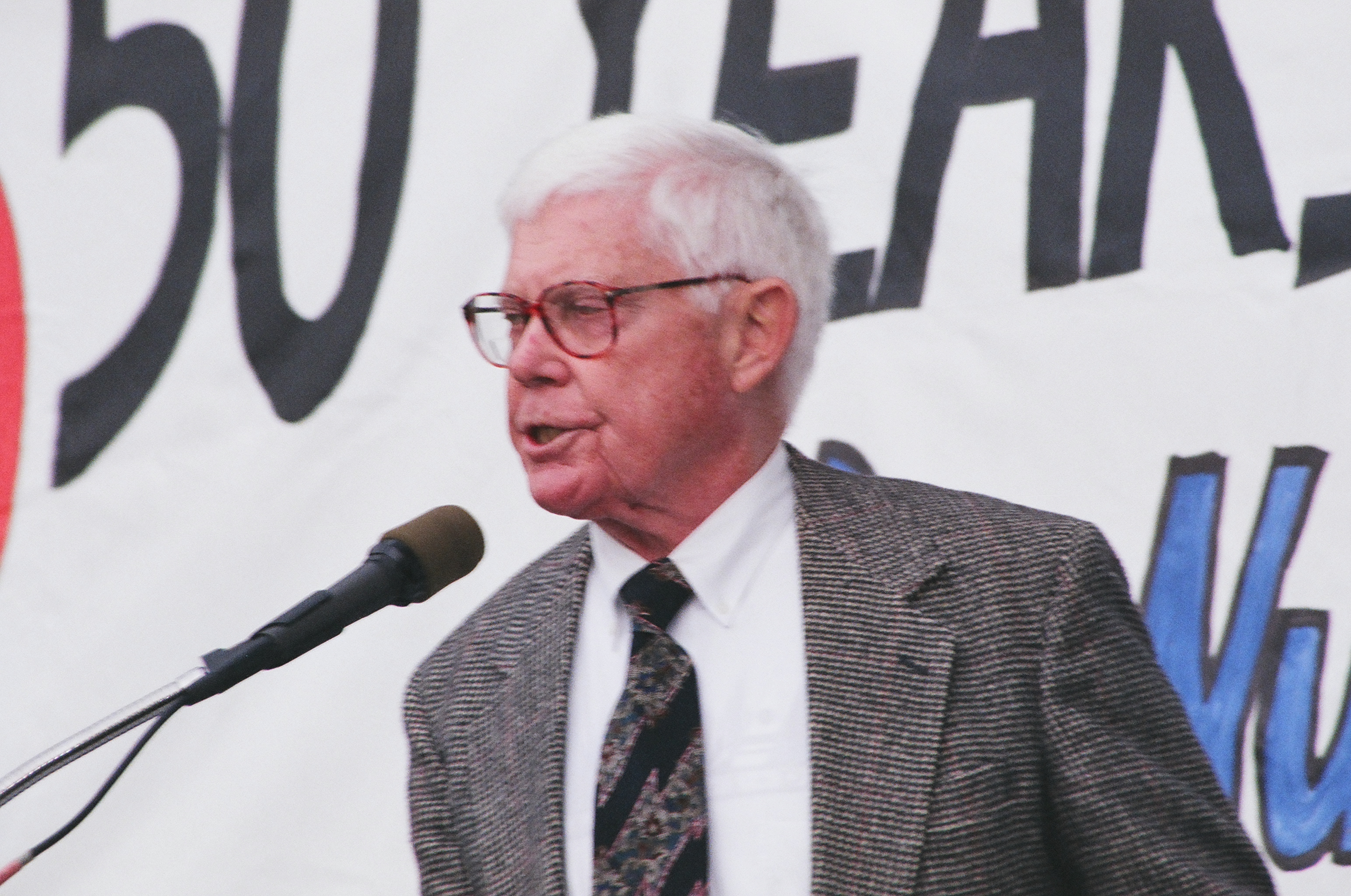
Anderson speaking at a rally, 1999

By the end of the campaign, much of Anderson's support came from college students. Jesse Ventura stated during an interview that he voted for Anderson in 1980. Anderson capitalized on that by becoming a visiting professor at a series of universities: Stanford University, University of Southern California, Duke University, University of Illinois College of Law, Brandeis University, Bryn Mawr College, Oregon State University, University of Massachusetts Amherst, and Nova Southeastern University and delivered the lecture at the 1988 Waldo Family Lecture Series on International Relations at Old Dominion University. In 1984, Anderson endorsed Walter Mondale over Ronald Reagan in the presidential election. He was chair of FairVote from 1996 to 2008, after helping to found the organization in 1992, and continued to serve on its board until 2014. He also served as president of the World Federalist Association and on the advisory board of Public Campaign and the Electronic Privacy Information Center, and was of counsel to the Washington, D.C.–based law firm of Greenberg & Lieberman, LLC.

He was the first executive director of the Council for the National Interest, founded in 1989 by former Congressmen Paul Findley (R-IL) and Pete McCloskey (R-CA) to promote American interests in the Middle East. In the 2000 U.S. presidential election, he was briefly considered as possible candidate for the Reform Party nomination but instead endorsed Ralph Nader, who was nominated by the Green Party. In January 2008, Anderson indicated strong support for the candidacy of a fellow Illinoisan, Democratic contender Barack Obama. In 2012, he played a role in the creation of the Justice Party, a progressive and social-democratic party organized to support the candidacy of former Salt Lake City mayor Rocky Anderson (no relation) for the 2012 U.S. presidential election. On August 6, 2014, he endorsed the campaign for the United Nations Parliamentary Assembly (UNPA), one of only six persons who served in Congress ever to do so.

== Death ==
Anderson died in Washington, D.C., on December 3, 2017, at the age of 95. He is interred at Arlington National Cemetery on June 22, 2018.

U.S. House of Representatives
Preceded by Leo E. Allen	Member of the U.S. House of Representatives from Illinois's 16th congressional district 1961–1981	Succeeded by Lynn M. Martin
Party political offices
Preceded by Melvin Laird	Chair of the House Republican Conference; 1969–1979	Succeeded by Samuel L. Devine
