= Donald W. Banner =

US Commissioner of Patents and Trademarks (1924–2006)

Director of the United States Patent and Trademark Office
- President: Richard Nixon; Jimmy Carter
- Preceded by: C. Marshall Dann
- Succeeded by: Sidney A. Diamond

Personal details
- Born: February 23, 1924 Chicago, Illinois, United States
- Died: January 29, 2006 (aged 81) Tucson, Arizona, United States
- Resting place: Arlington National Cemetery (Sec: 69, Site: 710)
- Education: Purdue University B.S. (1948); University of Detroit J.D. (1952); John Marshall Law School Master's of Patent Laws (1958)

Military service
- Allegiance: United States
- Branch/service: Army Air Force
- Rank: Second Lieutenant

Donald W. Banner (February 23, 1924 – January 29, 2006) was a United States Commissioner of Patents and Trademarks.

== Early life and career ==
Banner was born in Chicago and served as a P-47 pilot during World War II. He was shot down over Italy, and held in a German POW camp until April 29, 1945.

After the war, Banner attended Purdue University, graduating with a BSEE in 1948. He earned his Juris Doctor in 1952 from the University of Detroit. He later went on to earn his Master of Patent Law in 1958, and his Doctor of Laws in 1979 from the John Marshall Law School.

== Political career ==
Banner was appointed to be U.S. Commissioner of Patents and Trademarks by both Presidents Nixon and Carter, the only person to be so appointed by presidents of both political parties. He served in that office only during the Carter Administration from 1978 to 1979. After his time as Commissioner of Patents he entered private practice with the firm now known as Banner & Witcoff. He also served as director of the Patent Law Division at John Marshall Law School.

He died on January 29, 2006, in Tucson, Arizona.
