= Miccosukee Resort & Gaming =

Florida resort and casino

Miccosukee Casino & Resort
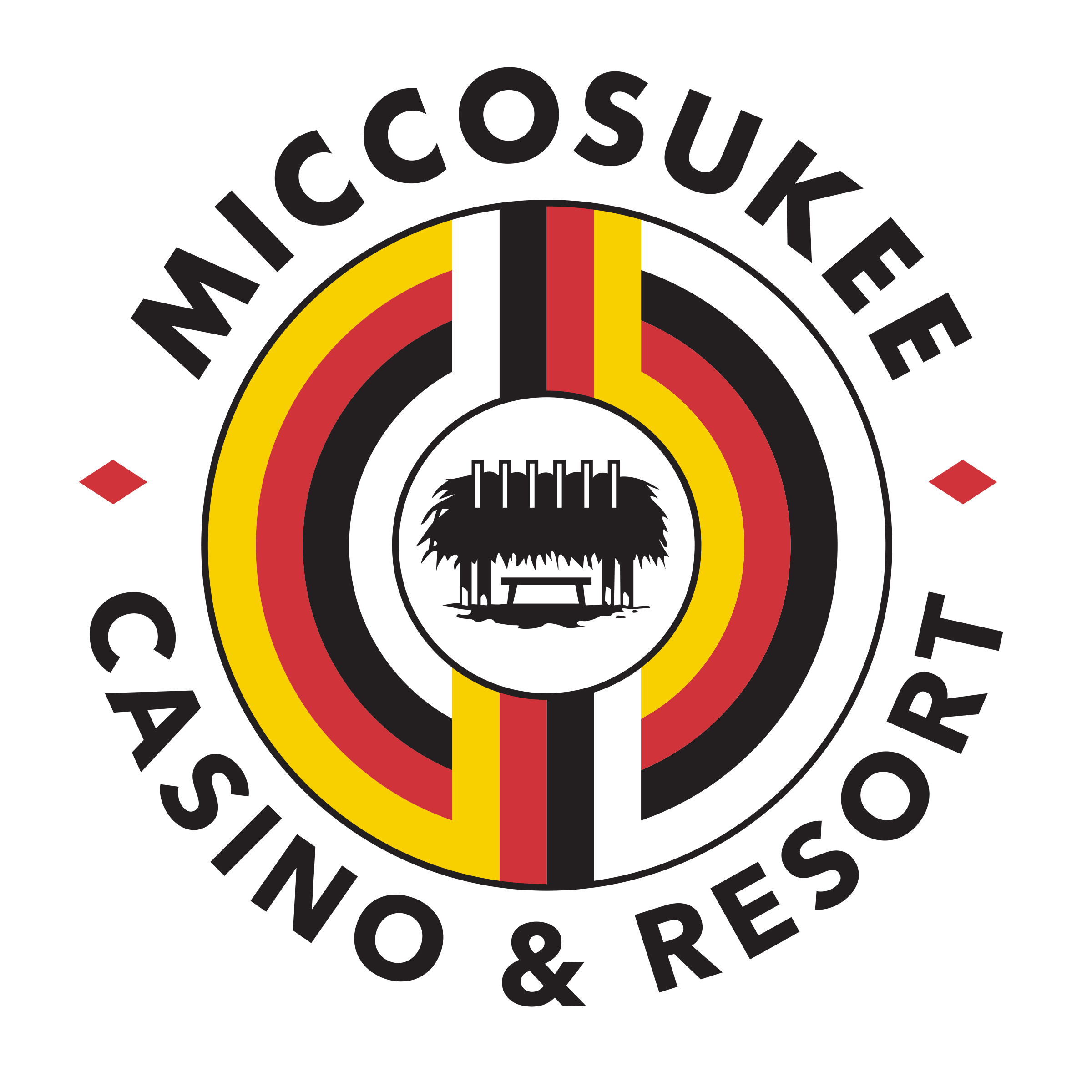

- Location within Florida

General information
- Type: Hotel and casino
- Location: SR 997 and US 41, Miami, Florida, US
- Coordinates: 25°45′48″N 80°29′4″W
- Completed: 1999
- Opened: 1999

Miccosukee Casino & Resort is a nine-story resort and casino located in the western outskirts of Miami, Florida, on the edge of the Everglades. It has a colored statue of a young Miccosukee boy outside the front entrance. It has been quoted to be "one of the most unusual resort destinations in Florida" due to the contrast between the Native American village surroundings and the casino. Established in 1999 at a reported cost of $45 million, it is operated by about 640 members of the Miccosukee Tribe. In 2009, it was estimated that the Miccosukee Resort generated revenue of around $75 million a year.

== Facilities ==
The resort has 302 rooms and suites, with guest facilities including a casino, dining, a conference center, and banquet facilities. Various events, including Boxing and MMA, are hosted at Miccosukee Casino. The casino includes slot machines and a poker section where it regularly hosts poker tournaments.

== Dining ==
There are four dining locations:

- La Brisa: Latin fusion cuisine
- Tempt Lounge: upscale bar
- B1 Grill: Mixed foods
- Max's Grab & Go: 24-hour kiosk

== Other ==
The Miccosukee Golf and Country Club is also located nearby. On September 29, 2011, Miccosukee Resort, along with Romance 106.7FM, Budweiser, 411 pain and Walgreens, organized a Latin music concert in Miami named "Una Copa con Romance", attended by some 1500 people and artists such as Charlie Zaa. The resort is a setting in the 2010 Jonathan King novel Acts of Nature.

Nearby attractions also include the Miccosukee Indian Village, Miccosukee Airboat Tours through the Everglades, and alligator demonstrations that introduce visitors to the area's wildlife and Miccosukee cultural heritage.

== See also ==
- List of casinos in Florida
