= Banner Witcoff =

Banner Witcoff, Ltd.
- Headquarters: Chicago, Illinois USA
- No. of offices: 4
- No. of attorneys: 120
- Major practice areas: Intellectual Property Law
- Key people: Katie Laatsch Fink (President)
- Date founded: 1920
- Website: www.bannerwitcoff.com

Banner Witcoff, Ltd. is an American law firm that specializes in the practice of intellectual property law, including patent, trademark, copyright, trade secret, computer franchise and unfair competition law. The firm engages in the procurement, enforcement and litigation of intellectual property rights throughout the world, including all federal and state agencies, and the distribution of such rights through leasing and franchising. The firm has approximately 125 attorneys and agents in its Chicago, Washington, DC, Boston, and Portland offices.

== History ==
Banner Witcoff traces its history from 1920, in Des Moines, Iowa. The company's name was chosen when two regional intellectual property law firms, Allegretti & Witcoff and Banner, Birch, McKie & Beckett, joined forces to create a national firm. The firm opened the Chicago office of Banner & Witcoff in 1937. Subsequent offices were opened in Washington, DC (1960), Boston (1985), and Portland (1997).

In 2021, the firm announced the election of firm president, Binal Patel.

== Diversity ==
The firm has offered the Donald W. Banner Diversity Scholarship for Law Students annually since 2008.

== Practice groups ==
It has groups specializing in practicing: copyrights, design patents, jury trials, licensing, litigation, patent prosecution, trademarks, and trade secrets.

== Notable cases ==
Banner Witcoff has represented clients in landmark intellectual property law cases, including New York Times Co. v. Tasini and Diamond v. Chakrabarty.

New York Times Co. v. Tasini (2001) is a leading decision by the United States Supreme Court on the issue of copyright in the content of a newspaper database. Tasini held that The New York Timescould not license articles appearing in the newspaper that were written by freelance journalists. Justice Ginsburg wrote the 7–2 ruling in favor of the freelance writers, who were represented by Banner & Witcoff.

In Diamond v. Chakrabarty (1980) the U.S. Supreme Court held for the first time that a living, genetically-altered microorganism constituted patentable subject matter. The Chakrabarty decision spurred new interest in patents, particularly in the then-nascent biotechnology industry. Diamond v. Chakrabarty was a pivotal decision that has led to numerous breakthroughs in medical therapies, the development of bioengineered plants and food, and the issuance of thousands of patents. Banner & Witcoff was one of several law firms representing Chakrabarty.

== Notable attorneys and alumni ==
- Donald W. Banner, a founding member of Banner Witcoff, former U.S. Commissioner of Patents and Trademarks, former Chair of the American Bar Association Section of IP Law, former President of the American Intellectual Property Law Association, former President of the International Patent and Trademark Association, Co-founder and President of the Intellectual Property Owners Association, United States delegate to numerous international diplomatic conferences. He was the first American to receive the Pacific Industrial Property Association Award for Outstanding Contributions in the Intellectual Property Field. He received the Lifetime Achievement Award from The Sedona Conference for his dedication to the practice of intellectual property law and the Lifetime Achievement Award from the National Inventors Hall of Fame.
- Mark T. Banner, Former Chair of the American Bar Association Section of Intellectual Property Law.
- Darrell G. Mottley, Former President of the D. C. Bar, former Chair of the District of Columbia Bar's Council on Sections.
- Joseph M. Potenza, Chair of the American Bar Association Section of Intellectual Property Law, former Publications Officer and Chair of the Content Advisory Board for the ABA-IPL Section, former Federal Circuit representative for the American Bar Association Standing Committee on the Federal Judiciary.

== Reputation and awards ==
- Banner Witcoff is ranked as a top Illinois trademark firm in the 2021 edition of the World Trademark Review 1000.
- The 2021 edition of Chambers and Partners listed Banner Witcoff as an intellectual property law firm, with a Band 2 ranking for patent prosecution in the District of Columbia and Band 2 for intellectual property law in Illinois.
- Banner Witcoff is ranked in the 2021 edition of IAM Patent 1000: The World’s Leading Patent Professionals. The firm was ranked among the top firms nationally for patent prosecution. It also ranks the firm for litigation and patent prosecution in Illinois. Additionally, the firm was ranked for litigation and recommended for patent prosecution in Washington, D.C.
- Banner Witcoff's patent and patent prosecution practices were "recommended" and "highly recommended" in Managing IP's 2021 edition of IP Stars. Additionally, IP Stars “highly recommended” the firm’s trademark practice in Illinois. Banner Witcoff is one of only six firms to be “highly recommended”— the guide’s highest recognition — in the category.
- In the 2021 edition of U.S. News – Best Lawyers’ “Best Law Firms” Banner Witcoff received a National Tier 1 ranking in intellectual property litigation, patent litigation and patent law.
- Banner Witcoff currently holds the record for the most U.S. design patents procured in a calendar year and has held that record for the past 18 years.
- Banner Witcoff’s trademark practice was named by Managing Intellectual Property “2019 Trademark Contentious Firm of the Year” and “2019 Trademark Prosecution Firm of the Year” among Midwest law firms.
