= 411 PAIN =

Medical and legal referral business

411-PAIN
- Founded: 1995
- Founder: Robert Lewin
- Defunct: December 2018
- Headquarters: Davie, Florida, United States
- Services: medical and lawyer referral service

The company 1-800-411-PAIN Referral Service (or 411 PAIN) was an American medical and lawyer referral service until it closed in December 2018. The firm, based in Davie, Florida, was established in 1995 by Robert Lewin. The organization is an attorney-referral system for victims of motor vehicle accidents, slip and falls work-related injuries, and recreational accidents.

The Florida Trend cited it as one of Florida's larger for-profit lawyer referral services. Biotech Week cited the company as one of America's "leading treatment and lawyer referral resources for people injured in auto accidents."

== Background and trademark ==
411-PAIN was established in Florida in 1995 by chiropractor Robert Lewin. In a 2010 United States District Court Southern District of Florida case, it states that 411-PAIN provided "assistance to victims of motor vehicle, slip and fall, work-related, and recreational accidents seeking medical, chiropractic and therapeutic care and legal advice by referring them to doctors and other health care professionals, scheduling appointments, and referring victims seeking legal advice to local attorneys."

In advertising, the company is known for its phrase, "After 911, Call 411, 1-800-411-PAIN." Their radio and television-based commercials usually feature actors portraying police officers or emergency workers urging motor accident victims to contact both a lawyer and doctor as soon as possible after the crash after calling 911.

== Legal issues ==
In 2010, a class-action lawsuit was launched against 411-PAIN by Ganesh Sohan and Bryan Rodriguez alleging the company misrepresented the nature of their services and the compensation received by accident victims. The lawsuit states that instead of victims directly receiving the $10,000 stated in their advertisements, 411-PAIN operates by "secur[ing] insurance payments and reimbursement for medical services."

Sohan and Rodiguez's lawyers alleged that companies like 411-PAIN operate by referring them to clinics owned by the company, providing medical services that intentionally deplete the $10,000 maximum allowable medical costs that are covered by personal injury protection (PIP) insurance and billing clients for all other expenses. The lawsuit also stated that, at the time, they "unlawfully solicit[ed] clients... on behalf of lawyers pursuing personal injury claims" and "intentionally misled consumers into believing they are contacting a lawyer for legal services or a service that will explain to them their rights... when, in fact, they are contacting chiropractic medical clinics."

In 2012, the Attorney General of the State of Florida sued 411-PAIN for unlawfully misrepresenting the amount of money and compensation to which customers were entitled in their advertising and for misleading clients into believing that police officers required accident victims to call 411 PAIN after dialing 911 following an accident. The case was settled out of court, and 411-PAIN agreed to change its advertising practices and make a charitable contribution of $550,000 to the Broward Health Foundation and the Joe DiMaggio Children's Hospital.

== Charitable giving ==
411-PAIN was involved in the Read and Rise program in low-income schools in both Miami-Dade and Broward Counties, donating $60,000 to the cause. They funded $60,000 for what is known as the 411 Pain Cash for Teachers Contest, which "awards $1,000 per month to a teacher in each county, culminating with a May grand prize of $11,000 for each district."

In March 2011, they donated $2,120 to Miami-Dade Schools Superintendent Alberto M. Carvalho and Martha Harris, principal of Dr. Henry W. Mack Elementary School in Miami, to fund a Scholastic Book Fair in which $5 gift certificates were given to children to buy books of their choice. The firm organized the 411 Pain Bowl between schools in southern Florida and was active in the campaign against bullying in schools, sponsoring The Prevention Team, an anti-bullying organization.

In September 2011, the company, along with Romance 106.7FM, Budweiser, Miccosukee Resort & Gaming and Walgreens, organized a Latin music concert in Miami named "Una Copa con Romance," attended by some 1,500 people and artists such as Charlie Zaa. In October 2011, the firm sponsored basketball coach Isiah Thomas's Mary's Court foundation and the "South Florida All-Star Classic" charity match featuring LeBron James, Dwyane Wade, and Chris Bosh, held at the S. Century Bank Arena on the Modesto Maidique Campus of Florida International University.
