= AIPLA Quarterly Journal =

- Discipline: Intellectual property law
- Language: English
- Edited by: Joan Schaffner & Caroline Totz

Publication details
- History: 1972; 54 years ago to present
- Publisher: American Intellectual Property Law Association and the George Washington University Law School (United States)
- Frequency: Quarterly

Standard abbreviations
- Bluebook: AIPLA Q.J.
- ISO 4: AIPLA Q. J.

Indexing
- ISSN: 0883-6078
- LCCN: 85648674
- OCLC no.: 10686580

Links
- Journal homepage

The AIPLA Quarterly Journal is a law journal covering intellectual property matters that is jointly published by the American Intellectual Property Law Association and the George Washington University Law School. The Journal was established in 1972 and is student-edited.
