= Biotech Week =

Biotech Week is a weekly biotechnology and pharmaceutical trade magazine. The magazine was established in 1999. It is published by NewsRX. The magazine covers a broad range of medical issues and financially related information about companies in these industries. The magazine is headquartered in Atlanta, Georgia.
