= Ohev Sholom Talmud Torah Congregation of Olney =

Orthodox Jewish synagogue in Olney, Maryland, US

- Location within Maryland

Religion
- Affiliation: Orthodox Judaism
- Ecclesiastical or organisational status: Synagogue
- Status: Active

Location
- Location: 18320 Georgia Avenue, Olney, Maryland 20832
- Country: United States
- Coordinates: 39°09′26″N 77°03′59″W

Architecture
- Established: 1995 (as a congregation)
- Groundbreaking: 2004
- Completed: 2005

Website
- osttolney.org

Ohev Sholom Talmud Torah Congregation of Olney, commonly known as OSTT, is an Orthodox synagogue located at 18320 Georgia Avenue, in Olney, Maryland, in the United States.

== History ==
The OSTT was founded in 1995 by fourteen families in the Olney community, holding services in a private home on Georgia Avenue.

OSTT started as a branch of Ohev Sholom Talmud Torah Congregation of Washington, D.C., now known as Ohev Sholom - The National Synagogue; and OSTT became independent in 2001–2005. However the formation of the new spin-off congregation resulted in a legal conflict. Eventually a lower US court's decision was overturned by the Appeals Court of the District of Columbia in 2005 that sent the case for arbitration in a beit din. At dispute was the financial control of common assets between the older National Synagogue located in Washington, D.C., and the newer one of the spin-off OSTT congregation located in Olney, that borders on the original "older" neighborhood.

By 2014 OSTT was independent and had expanded under the leadership of Rabbi Shaya Milikowsky for ten years. Milikowsky is an alumnus of Ner Israel Yeshiva of Baltimore, Maryland, and a former president of the Association for Jewish Outreach Programs. As noted by historian Adam Ferziger, in the late 1990s Milikowsky led a Jewish outreach training program known as "MAOR" at the Ner Israel Yeshiva in Baltimore and still runs it from OSTT.

== Affiliations ==
OSTT of Olney works in conjunction with the Friedman Kollel of Metropolitan Washington that is headed by Rabbi Eliezer Lachman. A kollel is an institution devoted to higher Talmudic studies, at times it also serves the Jewish adult education needs in various communities, as in the case of OSTT utilizing the rabbis and scholars at the Friedman Kollel of Metropolitan Washington. Milikowsky's pioneering work in the interplay between rabbinic, synagogue, kollel, Jewish outreach and Jewish communal life has been noted by scholars such as Adam Ferziger.

The synagogue works in conjunction with the Jewish Family Center of Northern Montgomery County (or: Center for Jewish Living and Learning of Northern Montgomery County) a Jewish educational outreach organization that is located on adjoining premises.

The synagogue headed by Rabbi Shaya Milikowsky, is affiliated with the Rabbinical Council of Greater Washington the main Orthodox kosher supervision agency in the Washington metropolitan area. In addition to the synagogue and kollel, Milikowsky continues to control and head the "MAOR" Orthodox Jewish outreach organization at the same location as the synagogue.

== See also ==
- History of the Jews in Maryland
