= Future Media Architects =

Future Media Architects, Inc.
- Company type: Private
- Industry: Internet
- Founded: British Virgin Islands (2002)
- Key people: Thunayan K. Al-Ghanim, Founder and former CEO

Future Media Architects is a defunct internet development company founded in 2002 and focused on acquiring and developing premiere domain names and web properties. Future Media Architects is primarily known for its large portfolio of internet domain names, estimated to exceed 120,000 in 2011. Future Media Architects has faced several lawsuits related to cybersquatting activities.

== History ==
Future Media Architects was founded by Thunayan Khalid Al-Ghanim, known by his internet alias "elequa", in 2002. Born in 1970 in London, Al-Ghanim "comes from a respected Kuwaiti family that has international business interests".

By mid-2003, Future Media Architects had "amassed more than 12,000 quality domains", including media.com, multimedia.com, fm.com, mp3.tv, dj.net, and oxide.com. The company purchased i.net, a major ICANN-approved internet registry, to process and manage its portfolio of domain names purchases.

By 2011, Future Media Architects held over 120,000 domain names, though Al-Ghanim said, "I haven't been an active buyer lately."

In 2016, Future Media Architects reversed a longstanding policy not to sell domain names, and began offloading parts of its domain portfolio. Notably, it sold a number of four-letter domain names in the Chinese market. In 2017, Future Media Architects listed almost 10,000 domain names for sale on the Uniregistry market. Between 2014 and 2018, Future Media Architects's domain name sales were estimated at $24M.

In March 2019, after "a dispute that lasted four years", Al-Ghanim was removed as an officer of Future Media Architects. The company is now under control of his sister, Shareefah Khalid Al-Ghanim. "According to court documents, Mrs. Alghanim asserted that her brother mismanaged the company, and indulged in a variety of vices impeding his judgement when making decisions about Future Media Architects. The two siblings were equal partners in the company with a 50% stake each."

== Lawsuits & Controversy ==
Future Media Architects and Al-Ghanim have faced several lawsuits related to cybersquatting activities, with judgements found both for and against Future Media Architects. Examples of disputed domains include kiwi.com, jackass.com, and calcar.org.
