= Stratagene California =

Stratagene California was an American biotechnological company based in La Jolla, California, a maker of life science research and diagnostic products. It was established in 1984 and incorporated in California. It has been involved with the fields of cellular analysis, cloning, cytogenomics, DNA methylation and DNA Sizing and Quantification and food testing. In 2007, Agilent Technologies acquired Stratagene for $250 million, spinning off certain business assets and licensing certain molecular diagnostics technology to a new entity, Decisive Diagnostics. As of October 2011, the Chief Executive of the new company is Joseph Sorge, original founder and CEO of Stratagene.
