= Shmuel Herzfeld =

American Modern Orthodox rabbi

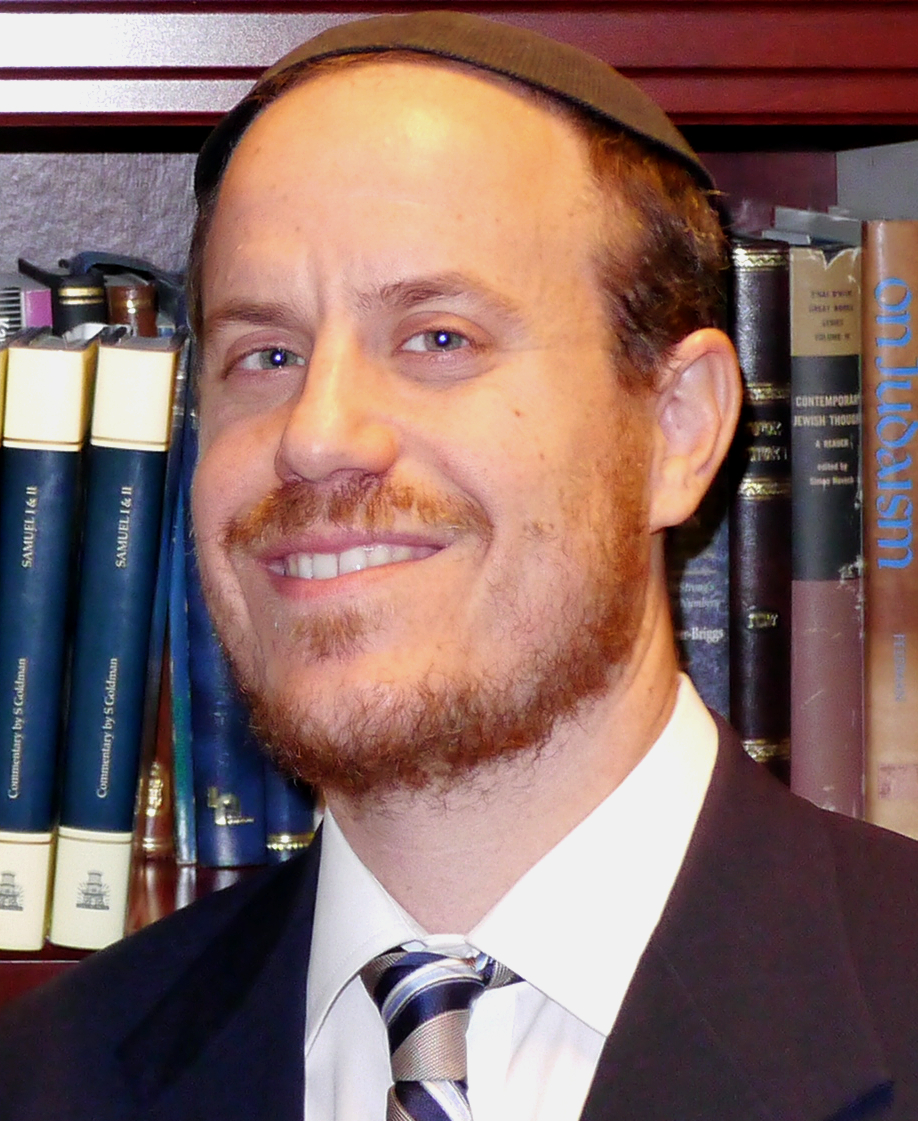
- ca. July 2014
- Title: Rabbi

Personal life
- Born: October 9, 1974 (age 52) Staten Island, New York
- Children: 7
- Education: Bernard Revel Graduate School of Jewish Studies

Religious life
- Religion: Judaism
- Denomination: Modern Orthodox

Jewish leader
- Synagogue: Yeshivas Elimelech
- Organisation: AMCHA Initiative
- Semikhah: Rabbi Isaac Elchanan Theological Seminary

Shmuel Herzfeld (born October 9, 1974) is an American Orthodox rabbi. He is the Rosh Yeshiva (dean) of Yeshivas Elimelech. He previously served as Senior Rabbi of Ohev Sholom - The National Synagogue in Washington, D.C., and before that as Associate Rabbi at the Hebrew Institute of Riverdale. He is a teacher, lecturer, activist, and author.

== Early life and education ==
Herzfeld is from Staten Island, New York City. He is one of five children from parents Jacob and Caryl Herzfeld. His mother, an artist, illustrated one of his books, An Extra Seat. His youngest brother, Akiva, served as Rabbi of Shaarey Tphiloh in Portland, Maine. His eldest brother, Baruch, is an entrepreneur and activist for e-bike safety who has utilized free bicycle loans to bring together different segments of the Jewish community in Brooklyn.

Herzfeld received his smicha (ordination) from the Rabbi Isaac Elchanan Theological Seminary in 1999, and a master's degree in Jewish history from Bernard Revel Graduate School of Yeshiva University. He received a master's degree in medieval Jewish history from Yeshiva University under the guidance of Haym Soloveitchik; his thesis was on the topic of "Hechlid Be-Miut Simanim" (see Babylonian Talmud Hullin 30a). During his rabbinate at the Hebrew Institute of Riverdale, Herzfeld was mentored by Avi Weiss.

== Career ==
Herzfeld served as the assistant rabbi under Rabbi Avi Weiss at the Hebrew Institute of Riverdale from 1999 to 2004 before transferring to Ohev Sholom.

From 2008 to 2010, Herzfeld hosted a weekly radio show called Shmoozin' with Shmuel, which was aimed at Jews in the Washington, DC community, and frequently wrote columns in newspapers. His writings have appeared in many publications, including The New York Times, the New York Sun, The Jewish Week, The Forward, and Washington Jewish Week. He has appeared in the national news, including The New York Times, The Washington Post, NPR, CNN and Fox News. On May 23, 2014, Herzfeld delivered the opening prayer for the United States House of Representatives as a guest Chaplain.

Under Herzfeld's leadership, the Shepherd Park eruv, first built in 2004, was merged with the Woodside eruv in 2013, creating the combined Shepherd Park/Woodside Community eruv encompassing over half a dozen synagogues and thousands of Jewish families.

In 2004, Herzfeld began working at Ohev Sholom - The National Synagogue, the oldest continuous Orthodox synagogue operating in Washington, DC, with a vision of taking the spirit of the synagogue out to the community and to welcome all Jews regardless of their prior Jewish background or training. He has increased the synagogue's membership from 75 families to approximately 375 families as of 2015.

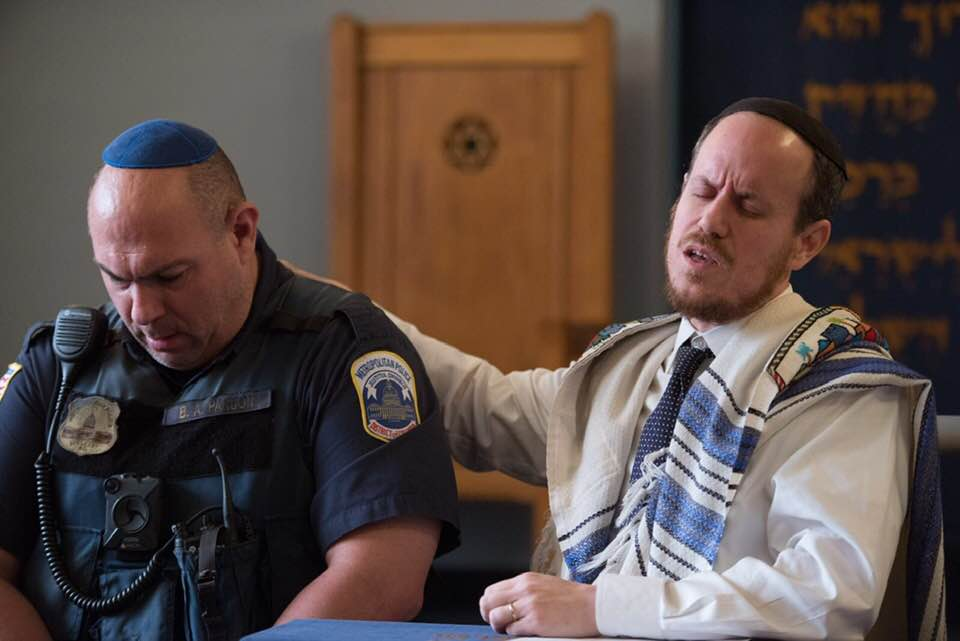
Rabbi Shmuel Herzfeld with a D.C. police officer

In December 2014 under Herzfeld's leadership, the Ohev Sholom Makor Chaim Mikvah opened to the public. The mikvah is a modern, clean, and fully accessible mikvah open to the entire community.

In February 2015, Herzfeld took a leadership role in forming the Beltway Vaad. Herzfeld's role is Kashrut Administrator, and continues to play a role in the certification of Soupergirl, along with the DC Vaad and the Star-K of Baltimore.

In April 2018, Herzfeld founded the DC Kosher organization, providing free kashrut supervision to vegan and vegetarian restaurants in the DC area. As of December, 2018, the organization supervises over a dozen restaurants, bakeries, and products.

In 2022 Rabbi Herzfeld left his position at Ohev Sholom and opened a yeshiva.

Rabbi Herzfeldl's Daf Yomi podcast (5 minute daf) has over 1 million downloads.

== Activism ==
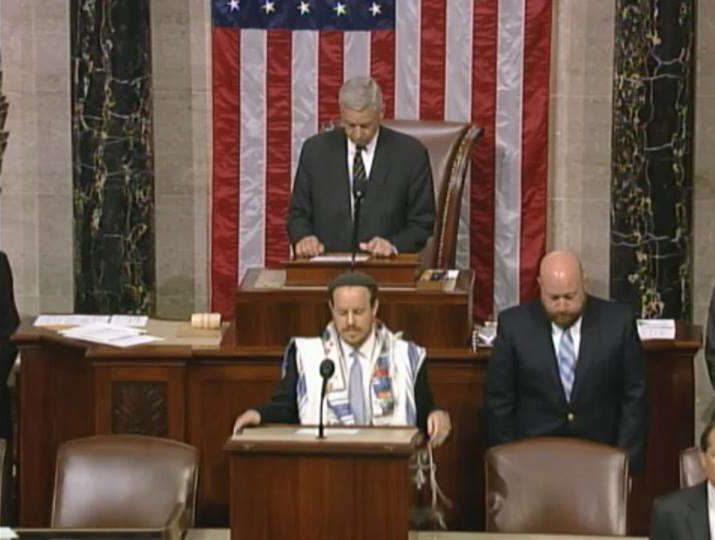
Rabbi Shmuel Herzfeld delivering the opening prayer as guest chaplain at the United States House of Representatives on May 23, 2014

Herzfeld is a Jewish Orthodox activist. He has been vocal on many issues, including Israel activism, Jewish outreach, the threat of anti-Semitism, gay rights, and the plight of the agunah. Herzfeld is currently the Vice President for Amcha - the coalition for Jewish concerns, a grass-roots coalition which engages in pro-Jewish activism.

In 2008, The New York Times published Herzfeld's op-ed article suggesting that meat produced under abusive conditions by Agriprocessors, a kosher meat company, should be considered unkosher. This article attracted media attention in NPR, other newspapers, and many blogs.

Herzfeld has been outspoken regarding the problem of the agunah, appearing in a front-page article in The New York Times in January 2011. This article generated a significant amount of media attention and put a spotlight on the agunah crisis within Orthodox Judaism.

Herzfeld has also been vocal regarding antisemitism in Europe, particularly in France. In early January, 2015, after the deadly terrorist attacks at a kosher supermarket in Paris, Herzfeld published an op-ed in the Washington Post arguing that the U.S. should do whatever it can to welcome European Jews to the United States. Herzfeld continues to speak out in support of European Jewry, and marched with the French Ambassador at a rally in early 2015.

Herzfeld is a critic of Donald Trump and his presidential campaign. During Trump's speech to the annual AIPAC Conference in 2016, Herzfeld stood and shouted out: "Do not listen to this man. He is wicked. He inspires racists and bigots." Herzfeld later wrote: "With every cell in my body I felt the obligation as a rabbi to declare his wickedness to the world."

== Works ==
Herzfeld has written five books:

- Fifty-Four Pick Up: Fifteen Minute Inspirational Torah Lessons (2012)
- Food for the Spirit: Inspirational Lessons from the Yom Kippur Service: The Orlofsky Edition (2014)
- Lieberman Open Orthodox Haggadah (2015), a bestseller on Amazon.com and at the Jerusalem Book Fair. A second printing and Hebrew edition were published in 2016.
- Renewal: Inspirational Lessons of Rosh Hashana (2015)
- An Extra Seat (English and Hebrew Editions) (2016)

Herzfeld records and publishes the daily "5 Minute Daf Yomi" podcast, in which he provides a brief overview of the day's page of Talmud. He began recording podcasts in late 2015, and has received over 200,000 downloads since then.

In September 2017, Herzfeld debuted the "AlefBlessed" cards, a Jewish high-holiday themed playing card series. As a result of their popularity, these were followed by "AlefBlessed 2" cards in 2018, displaying Jewish heroes throughout history. He has adopted the label "Matzoh Man" for wearing a matzoh suit while driving around in a car with a matzoh design.

In late 2018, Herzfeld began writing a complete Torah by hand, an enormous task which is generally undertaken by professional scribes and not by congregational Rabbis. Herzfeld completed the Torah in June 2019, which culminated with a parade in NW Washington DC in September, 2019. Herzfeld's daughter, Lea, published a yearbook in July 2019, which documented the journey Herzfeld took with his congregants in writing the Torah. Herzfeld also recently debuted his graphic novel titled "The Making of a Torah Scroll."

== Personal life ==
Herzfeld currently resides in Washington, DC, with his wife, Rhanni Herzfeld, and seven children.
