= Ohev Sholom Congregation =

Orthodox synagogue in Washington, D.C.

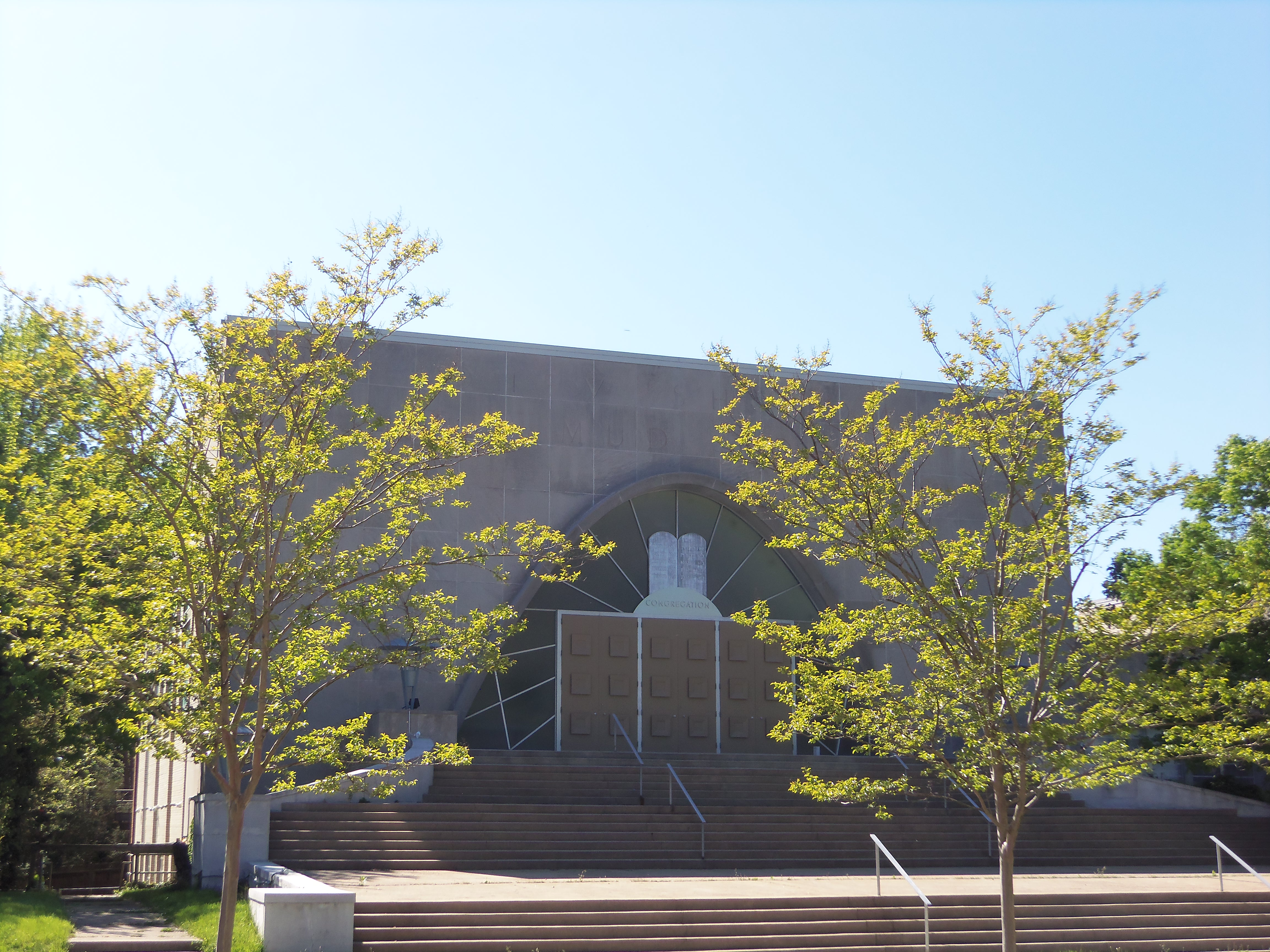
- Ohev Sholom synagogue

- Location in the District of Columbia

Religion
- Affiliation: Orthodox Judaism
- Rite: Nusach Ashkenaz
- Ecclesiastical or organisational status: Synagogue
- Leadership: Rabbi David Wolkenfeld
- Status: Active

Location
- Location: 1600 Jonquil Street, Shepherd Park, NW Washington, D.C.
- Country: United States
- Coordinates: 38°59′03″N 77°02′14″W

Architecture
- Type: Synagogue
- Groundbreaking: 1958
- Completed: 1960

Website
- www.ohevdc.org

Ohev Sholom Congregation (previously Ohev Sholom Talmud Torah [Hebrew for Lovers of Peace and Study of Torah] and Ohev Sholom – The National Synagogue) is the oldest Orthodox synagogue in the Shepherd Park neighborhood of Washington, D.C., in the United States.

The synagogue was formed from the merger of two synagogues, Ohev Sholom and Talmud Torah.

== History ==
Ohev Sholom Talmud Torah was formed in 1958 as a merger between Ohev Sholom Congregation, founded as Chai Adon Congregation in 1886, and Talmud Torah Congregation (the synagogue in which the father of Al Jolson once served as cantor), founded three years later. Ohev Sholom was previously situated at 5th and I Streets, NW, while Talmud Torah was previously situated at 14th and Emerson Streets, NW, having moved there from E Street in Southwest Washington. Their combined Shepherd Park building opened in 1960. Membership fell in the late twentieth century as Jewish families moved to the suburbs. The synagogue opened a branch composed largely of younger families in Olney, Maryland, in 1994, which became the separate congregation Ohev Sholom Talmud Torah Congregation of Olney between 2002 and 2005. Only a few, mostly older families, were left at the Washington DC location.

Early in the new century, a number of families who preferred urban life decided to attempt to revive Orthodox Jewish life in Shepherd Park. Hiring a new rabbi, Shmuel Herzfeld who was formerly the associate rabbi at the Hebrew Institute of Riverdale synagogue headed by Rabbi Avi Weiss, was central to this effort. The decision to rename the synagogue "The National Synagogue" in 2005 drew a good deal of criticism, not least from among other Jews, who felt that the name was a marketing label inaccurately implying a special position of leadership in the American Jewish community. Rabbi Herzfeld defended the choice on the grounds that the name makes clear that the synagogue is welcoming and open to everyone. Herzfeld insisted that in spite of the copyright on the phrase, other synagogues should feel free to use the same label.

During Rabbi Herzfeld’s tenure, the synagogue experienced significant growth. It promoted its services through leaflets and television and radio advertisements, offered free Yom Kippur services, and installed ramps and elevators to improve accessibility.

Herzfeld left to found a yeshiva at the end of 2021. In 2023, the synagogue was renamed to simply "Ohev Sholom", dropping "The National Synagogue".

== Today ==
Ohev Sholom Congregation advertises itself as a dynamic Orthodox community that values Torah, prayer, and good deeds. The congregation touts its location in NW Washington as easily accessible to surrounding neighborhoods in the District of Columbia and Maryland. The congregation counts in its membership a growing number of working professionals, families with small children, and others.

== External resources ==
- Official website
