= Hebrew Institute of Riverdale =

Modern Orthodox synagogue in the Bronx, New York

Hebrew Institute of Riverdale The Bayit
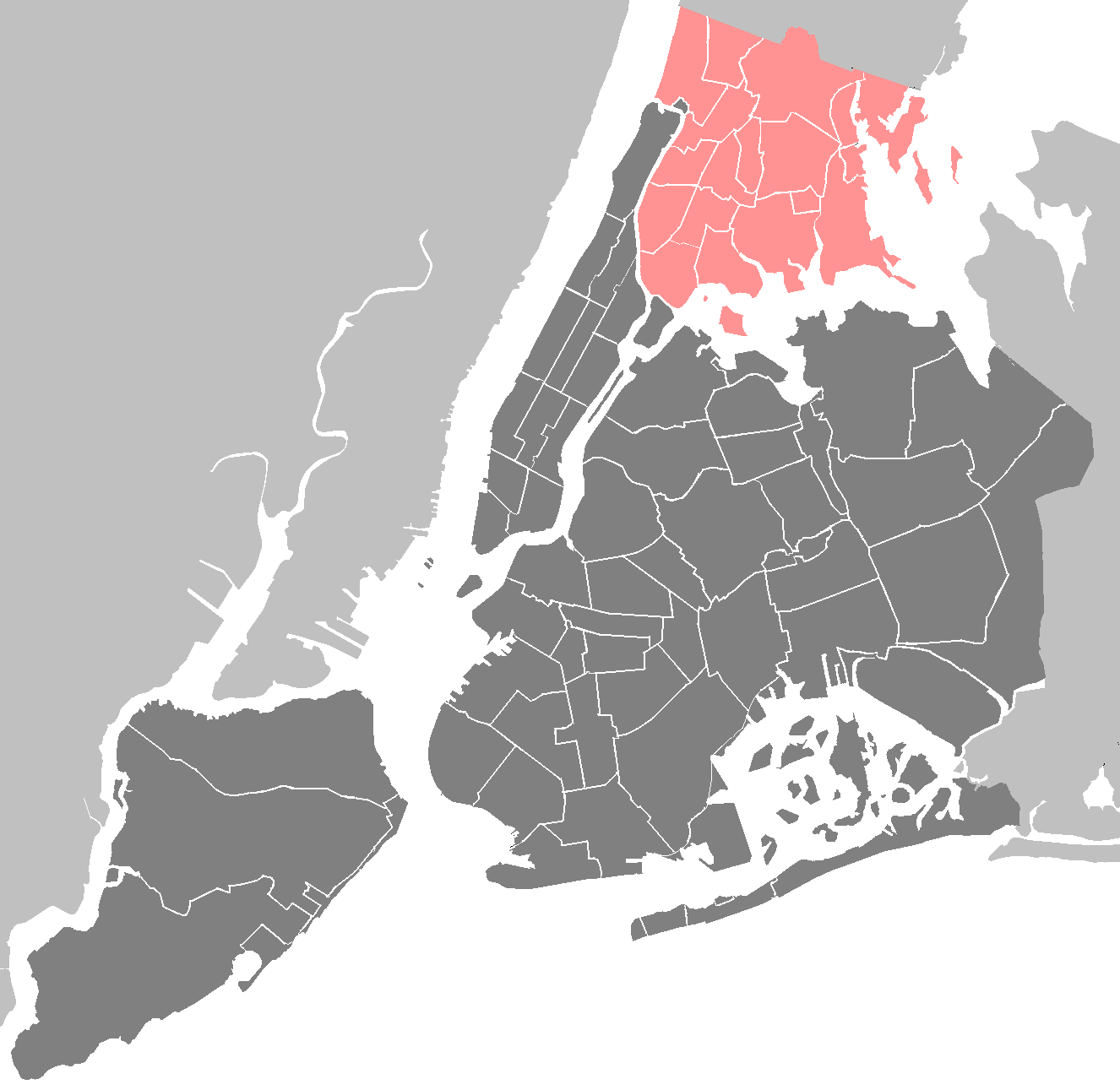
- Location in the Bronx, New York City

Religion
- Affiliation: Judaism
- Rite: Modern Orthodoxy
- Ecclesiastical or organisational status: Synagogue
- Leadership: Rabbi Steven Exler; Rabbanit Bracha Jaffe (Associate); Rabba Sara Hurwitz (Part time)
- Status: Active

Location
- Location: 3700 Henry Hudson Parkway, Riverdale (The Bronx), New York City, New York
- Country: United States
- Coordinates: 40°53′17″N 73°54′38″W

Architecture
- Established: 1924 (as the Hebrew Institute of University Heights)
- Completed: 1980 (current building)

Website
- thebayit.org

The Hebrew Institute of Riverdale, commonly called The Bayit, is a Modern Orthodox Jewish congregation and synagogue at 3700 Henry Hudson Parkway in the Riverdale neighborhood of the Bronx in New York City, New York, United States.

The congregation's founding dates from 1924 and was led by Rabbi Avi Weiss from 1973 to 2015. Weiss has since assumed the role as Rabbi in Residence and Rabbi Steven Exler assumed the role of Senior Rabbi.

The congregation is known for its pioneering of women's participation in prayer and Torah study. The synagogue introduced one Friday night "the first woman to lead this service in an established Orthodox synagogue in front of a mixed congregation."

== History ==
The congregation was founded in 1924 as the Hebrew Institute of University Heights. Due to changing demographics in the Bronx, the congregation relocated to Riverdale in 1971, and renamed itself as the Hebrew Institute of Riverdale, establishing itself in rented premises in a boiler room of the Whitehall Building off the Henry Hudson Parkway. In 1973, Avi Weiss, who had finished his training at Yeshiva University a few years earlier, became the synagogue's rabbi. The congregation met at the Whitehall apartment building in the early years, before constructing a permanent building in 1980.

The Hebrew Institute became known for its activism in the campaign to free Soviet Jewry and in defense of Israel.

The congregation has grown to 850 families and served as a platform for Weiss's rabbinical advocacy. The Jerusalem Post has called the Hebrew Institute "a training ground for young Modern Orthodox rabbis who go on to take over congregations of their own".
