= Licensing Executives Society International =

The Licensing Executives Society International, or LES International (LESI, or formally "LES International, Inc."), is a not for profit, non-political, umbrella organization having 33 national and regional member societies, interested in technology transfer or licensing of intellectual property rights - from technical know-how and patented inventions to software, copyright and trademarks. It was founded in 1973, and incorporated in 2000 in the United States. As of 2019, LESI has approximately 9,000 individual members in 90 countries, including representatives of companies, scientists, engineers, academicians, governmental officials, lawyers, patent and trademark attorneys, and consultants".

LESI publishes a quarterly journal called les Nouvelles. The organization was one of eight trade organizations to participate in the World Intellectual Property Day 2022 event produced by the United States Patent and Trademark Office.
