= Leonard Ruben =

American lawyer and judge from Maryland (1925–2007)

L. Leonard Ruben (1925 – March 21, 2007) was a Montgomery County, Maryland judge from 1974 until his death.

He was elected to the Maryland House of Delegates in 1970, vacating the seat upon appointment to the Montgomery County's District Court, where he served ten years. He served another 10 years on the Circuit Court until 1995 when he hit the state's mandatory retirement age of 70. At that point he continued as a part-time judge. He died after collapsing outside the district courthouse in Silver Spring, Maryland. At the time, he had been married for 58 years to Ida Ruben, who filled his vacant House of Delegates seat in 1974, and remained in the state legislature until she lost a Democratic primary 22 years later, in September 2006. He was Jewish.
