= American Intellectual Property Law Association =

- Formation: 1897
- Type: Legal Society
- Headquarters: Crystal City, Arlington County, Virginia
- Location: United States
- President: Salvatore Anastasi
- Key people: Vince Garlock, Executive Director
- Staff: 10
- Website: aipla.org

The American Intellectual Property Law Association (AIPLA), headquartered in Crystal City, Arlington County, Virginia, is a U.S., voluntary bar association constituted primarily of lawyers in private and corporate practice, in government service, and in the academic community. AIPLA represents individuals, companies and institutions involved in the practice of patent, trademark, copyright, and unfair competition law, as well as other fields of law affecting intellectual property. Members represent both owners and users of intellectual property.

== History ==
AIPLA was formed in 1897 as the American Patent Law Association. The name was formally changed in 1983 to AIPLA. The purpose of the organization, as set forth in the Articles of Incorporation, is “to maintain a high standard of professional ethics, to aid in the improvement in laws relating to intellectual property and in their proper interpretation by the courts, and to provide legal education to the public and to its members on intellectual property issues.”

== Governance ==
AIPLA is governed by a board of directors and has a staff of 8, headed by an executive director. AIPLA has over 60 committees which provide education to members and formulate proposed positions for the Board of Directors to consider adopting as association policy.

Q. Todd Dickinson, formerly the Under Secretary of Commerce for Intellectual Property and Director of the United States Patent and Trademark Office, was named Executive Director in 2008. Dickinson announced his decision to step down in a July 14, 2014 press release.

Lisa K. Jorgenson was named as the new Executive Director during the AIPLA 2014 Annual Meeting.

Vincent Garlock was named as the new Executive Director in September 2020.

== Publications ==
The association circulates the following publications to all members:

- AIPLA Quarterly Journal
- AIPLA eBulletin
- AIPLA Report of the Economic Survey

== Recent presidents ==
- 2025-2026: Salvatore Anastasi
- 2024-2025: Kimberly Van Voorhis
- 2023-2024: Ann M. Mueting
- 2022-2023: Brian B. Batzli
- 2021-2022: Patrick J. Coyne
- 2020-2021: Joseph R. Re
- 2019-2020: Barbara A. Fiacco
- 2018-2019: Sheldon H. Klein
- 2017-2018: Myra H. McCormack
- 2016-2017: Mark L. Whitaker
- 2015-2016: Denise W. DeFranco
- 2014-2015: Sharon A. Israel
- 2013-2014: Wayne P. Sobon
- 2012-2013: Jeffrey I.D. Lewis
- 2011-2012: William G. Barber
- 2010-2011: David W. Hill
- 2009-2010: Alan J. Kasper
- 2008-2009: Teresa Stanek Rea
- 2007-2008: James Pooley

== See also ==
- Intellectual property organization
