= Chesed Shel Emet =

Chesed Shel Emet (Hebrew: חֶסֶד שֶׁל אֱמֶת) is a Hebrew phrase meaning "a true act of kindness" or "the truest kindness."

== Meaning and context ==
In Hebrew, "chesed" means kindness or loving-kindness, and "emet" means truth. Together, Chesed Shel Emet refers specifically to the kindness shown to someone who cannot repay the act most often associated with caring for the dead, such as preparing a body for burial and attending funerals.

It's called "true" because it is done without expectation of reward or gratitude. The deceased cannot thank or repay the person performing the act. Thus, it represents the purest form of altruism in Jewish ethics.

== Linguistic and textual origins ==
The phrase "chesed shel emet" originates in the Hebrew Bible. The earliest and most frequently cited appearance is in the book of Genesis, where Jacob asks Joseph to promise that he will bury him in the Land of Israel, stating: “Do for me chesed ve’emet” (kindness and truth). Classical rabbinic commentators, including Rashi, interpret this request as referring to burial and explain that kindness toward the dead is “true kindness” because it cannot be repaid. Later biblical passages also associate kindness and truth as complementary moral virtues, reinforcing the ethical framework from which the later rabbinic concept developed. Rabbinic literature formalized the term chesed shel emet to describe acts of kindness performed for the deceased, distinguishing them from benevolent acts performed for the living, which may involve social recognition or reciprocity.

== Historical and religious significance ==
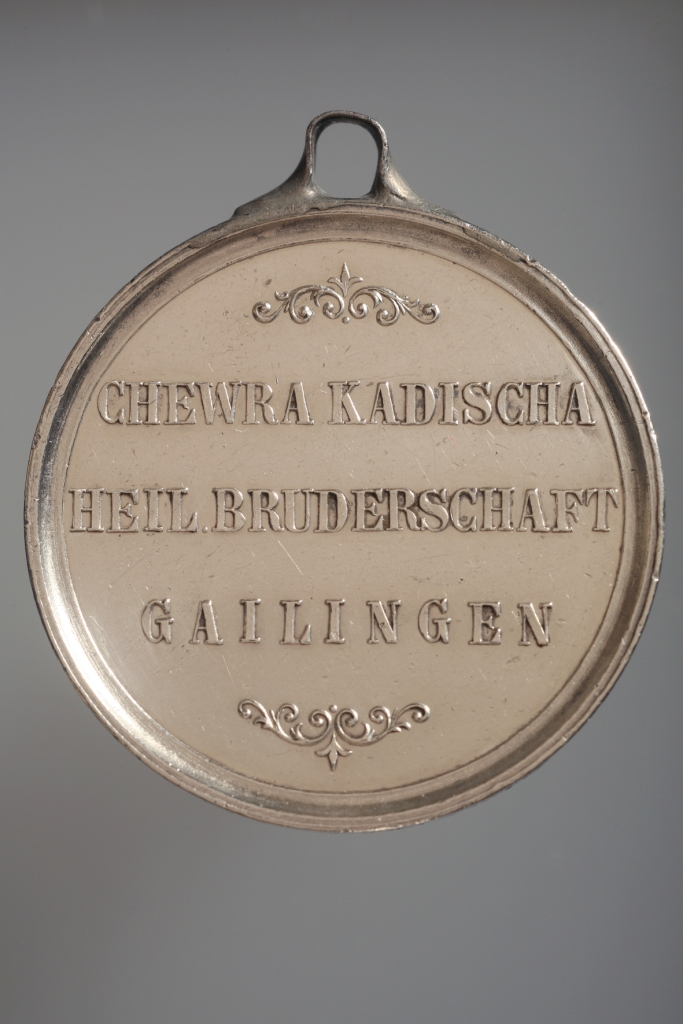
Chevra kadisha medal from 1876, on the occasion of the 200-year jubilee of the chevra kadisha of Gailingen. In the collection of the Jewish Museum of Switzerland.

The concept of Chesed Shel Emet is deeply rooted in Jewish halacha (law) and tradition. Jewish texts, including the Talmud and later rabbinic writings, emphasize the importance of ensuring proper burial and honoring the dead, describing these acts as a communal and spiritual responsibility. Historically, Jewish communities formed chevra kadisha (holy societies) dedicated to performing these duties, establishing structured rituals for washing, dressing, and burying the deceased according to halacha. In addition to the religious imperative, Chesed Shel Emet is often linked with moral education in Judaism, serving as a model of selfless service and ethical behavior. Philosophers and ethicists have highlighted that caring for those who cannot reciprocate exemplifies the highest ideals of communal solidarity and human dignity.

== Rituals and Practices ==
Chesed Shel Emet is most visibly expressed through the ritual practices of the chevra kadisha, the traditional Jewish burial society responsible for caring for the dead in accordance with halacha. These rituals emphasize dignity, respect, and equality for all individuals, regardless of social or economic status. The central ritual is tahara, the washing and purification of the body, followed by dressing the deceased in simple white shrouds (tachrichin) symbolizing purity and equality. A shomer traditionally keeps watch over the body until burial, a practice described in the Talmud as an act of honor. Escorting the deceased to the grave (levaya) is considered a major communal mitzvah, sometimes taking precedence over other obligations. Burial is carried out as soon as possible and with simplicity, following the example of Rabban Gamliel, who instituted modest funerary customs to preserve dignity for all.

== Use in practice ==
Logo image of Zaka, Chesed Shel Emet

Organizations like ZAKA (an Israeli volunteer emergency response and recovery organization) embody chesed shel emet by recovering and identifying human remains after disasters or attacks, Ensuring proper Jewish burial in accordance with halacha (Jewish law) and Providing dignity to the deceased and comfort to families.

Other Jewish organizations who help prepare members of the Jewish community for burial according to Orthodox tradition are the Chevra kadisha in Israel, and Chesed Shel Emes in Canada and the United States.

=== Organizations associated with chesed shel emet ===
(table)

Notable organizations associated with chesed shel emet
Organization	Founded	Location	Primary role	Notes
Chevra kadisha	Medieval period	Worldwide	Preparation of the deceased for burial according to Jewish law	Traditional communal burial societies found in most Jewish communities
ZAKA	1989	Israel	Recovery and identification of human remains	Known for disaster victim identification and ensuring proper burial
Chesed Shel Emes	1888	United States and Canada	Burial and funeral services	Orthodox burial society operating in multiple communities
