= Little Nell =

Little Nell may refer to:

== Arts and entertainment ==
- Nell Trent, fictional heroine of Charles Dickens's novel The Old Curiosity Shop (1840–41)
- "Little Nell", an 1857 ballad by Charles Sandys Packer (1810–1883)
- Little Nell, a character in Davy Crockett, an 1872 American play
- Little Nell, a 1917 short film starring Oliver Hardy (see Oliver Hardy filmography)
- Little Nell, a character in the 1925 short film Curses!, directed by Roscoe Arbuckle under the pseudonym William Goodrich
- Pearl Pureheart, sometimes called Little Nell, a Mighty Mouse cartoon character introduced in the 1940s
- Nell Campbell (born 1953), Australian actress, club owner, and singer, best known for her role as Columbia in The Rocky Horror Picture Show
- "Little Nell", a song on the 1964 album Gene Pitney Meets the Fair Young Ladies of Folkland
- Little Nell, 2007 play by Simon Gray

== Other uses ==
- Little Nell, winner of the 1872 Portland Handicap, a horse race in Great Britain
- Little Nell, a fountain with a sculpture in Hyde Park, London – see List of public art in Hyde Park, London
- Little Nell, a chairlift in Aspen Mountain (ski area), Colorado

== See also ==
- Little Nellie (disambiguation)
