= Ruhama Raz =

Israeli singer

Ruhama Raz רוחמה רז
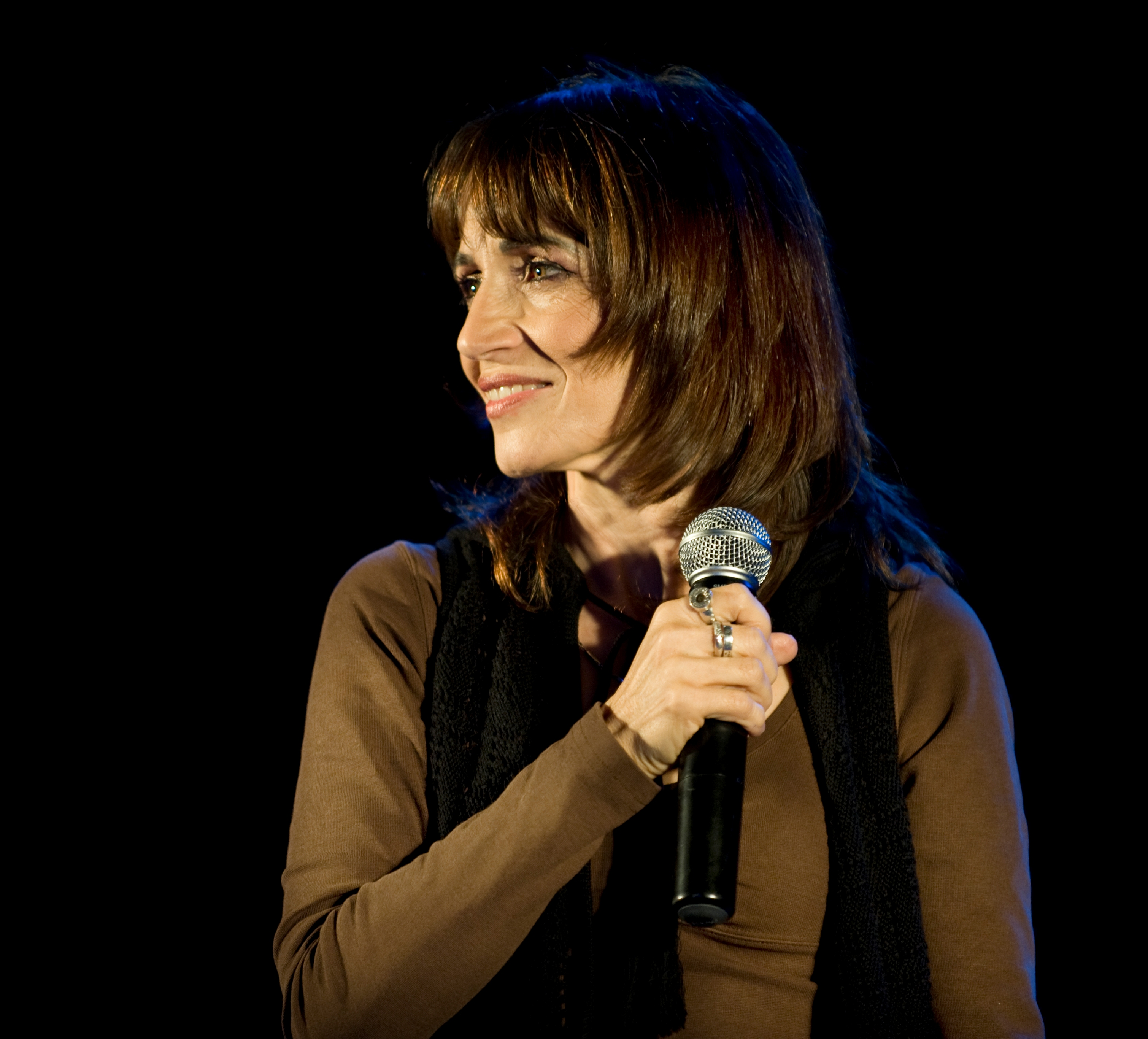
- Raz in 2008

Background information
- Born: Ruhama Zargari; 13 January 1955 (age 70); Jerusalem, Israel
- Genres: Folk; pop
- Occupation: Singer
- Instrument: Vocals
- Years active: 1977–present
- Website: http://www.ruhama.omanim.org/

Ruhama Raz (Hebrew: רוחמה רז; born 13 January 1955) is an Israeli singer.

== Biography ==
Raz was born in Jerusalem as Ruhama Zargari. Her parents immigrated from Iran and were described by Raz as "modern" parents who "made sure to speak Hebrew and supported us". When she was accepted to a military band she decided to change her last name to Raz. Raz served in the Central Command Band.

After she finished her military service Raz participated in the 1977 Song Festival (פסטיבל הזמר והפזמון) in which she won the first place with the song "Rakefet". In 1978 Raz participated in the children's song festival (פסטיבל שירי הילדים) with the song "Yaarit".

In 1979, Raz released the album "Dreams" (חלומות). The album included one of Raz's biggest solo hits, "Dreams" (חלומות), written by Rachel Shapiro to a music composed by Yair Klinger. During that time she married a member of Kibbutz Gal On. She moved to the kibbutz, where later the couple had two daughters. Raz choose to put a halt to her musical career in favor of raising her family. She returned to the stage in the mid 1980s and recorded the album "New in Town" (חדשה בעיר), which was released in 1988. Later on she released the album "In the heart of a small homeland" (בלב מולדת קטנה). This album also included a poem written in memory of her sister, Miriam Tzerafi, who was one of sixteen people killed in the 1989 Tel Aviv Jerusalem bus 405 terror attack.

In 1999, Raz participated in two songs of the Israeli rock band Knesiyat Hasekhel which were released in the band's third album named "Knesiyat Hasekhel".

In 2003, Raz released the album "You're dear to me" (אתה יקר לי). In addition, she also won the second place in the Ladino Festival (which held as part of the 2004 Israel Festival) with the song "The Bride".

In 2007, Raz participated in the recording of the song "Human Spirit" along with many Israeli artists, to raise awareness of psychiatric rehabilitation. In Hanukkah of 2007 Raz participated in the Israeli Children Songs Festival and won third place with the song "Collect the days". In December 2007 Raz released the album "Piece of sky" (פיסת שמיים).

Ruhama Raz is well identified among the Israeli public with her hometown of Jerusalem, and many of her songs are devoted to Jerusalem.
