= Misaskim =

American Jewish non-profit organization

- Formation: 2004
- Founder: Jack Meyer
- Type: Non-profit 501(c)3 organization
- Tax ID no.: 20-3957164
- Services: Bereavement, funeral, and burial assistance
- Leader: Meir Weill
- Affiliations: ZAKA
- Website: www.misaskim.org

Misaskim (Hebrew: מתעסקים) is an American Orthodox Jewish not-for-profit organization that provides services for the care of the dead and the needs and conveniences of mourners in accordance to Jewish law and custom. Misaskim provides moral support and bereavement assistance to individuals or families, while safeguarding the dignity of the deceased. They assist the bereaved by providing free shiva-related social links and lending religious articles. Their door signs at houses of mourning inform the public of the hours during which the mourner wishes to be visited. Misaskim also assists in providing burial plots and arranging funerals for those who are indigent or who do not have families, and in preventing cremations and autopsies, which are contrary to Jewish law.

Misaskim's Canadian affiliate, Misaskim Canada, is a registered charity.

== History ==
Misaskim was founded in Brooklyn in 2004 by a group of Hatzalah (volunteer ambulance) members and other community activists who perceived the need to help families during the painful time when a loved one dies. The small group decided to set up an organization with a 24-hour hotline. They named it Misaskim, which is the Ashkenazi pronunciation of a Hebrew word which means 'attendants', a term used for members of a Chevra Kadisha (Jewish burial society). Over time, additional programs and projects were added to Misaskim's original services of helping the bereaved.

Misaskim was directed by Yankie (Jack) Meyer, one of the organization's founders, and Meir Weill.

== Services ==
During major catastrophes or accidents with Jewish casualties, Misaskim dispatches a team of volunteers to any location in the United States on a moment’s notice. Misaskim’s mourners' services provide aveilim (mourners) with necessities, such as low chairs and Torah scrolls, during the week of shiva (mourning).

=== Care for the dead ===
Misaskim safeguards the dignity of the deceased by advocating to prevent autopsies and/or cremation, and educating government officials and coroners regarding respect to the Jewish departed.

=== Mourner's needs ===
Misaskim provides items needed for observing Shiva after the death of an immediate family member. They provide low chairs, Siddurim, Sefer Torah, folding chairs, guide to the customs of Shiva, and other items, free of charge.

=== Crisis relief ===
During disasters or tragedies, Misaskim volunteers clear crime scenes upon request by local law enforcement, find burial plots and arrange for the funeral, when necessary, and assists other Hebrew burial societies, providing sound systems, generator-powered lights for nighttime burials and solving logistical problems in order to arrange a funeral in a timely manner.

=== Other services ===
Misaskim reaches out to the orphans of the recently deceased with age-appropriate services, trips, gifts, and counseling, when necessary.

== Relationships with other organizations ==
In 2007, ZAKA announced cooperation with Misaskim, effectively making Misaskim the American branch of the Israeli organization.

== See also ==
- Chevra kadisha
