= Frank Mayo (stage actor) =

American actor (1839–1896)

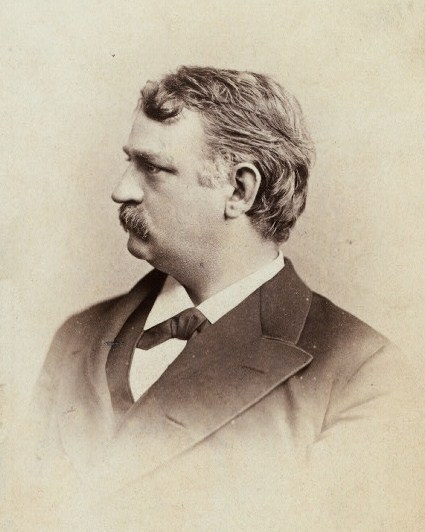
- Born: Francis Maguire; April 18, 1839; Boston, Massachusetts, U.S.
- Died: June 8, 1896 (aged 57); Grand Island, Nebraska, U.S.
- Burial place: West Laurel Hill Cemetery, Philadelphia, Pennsylvania, U.S.
- Occupation: Stage actor
- Children: 3
- Relatives: Frank Mayo (grandson)

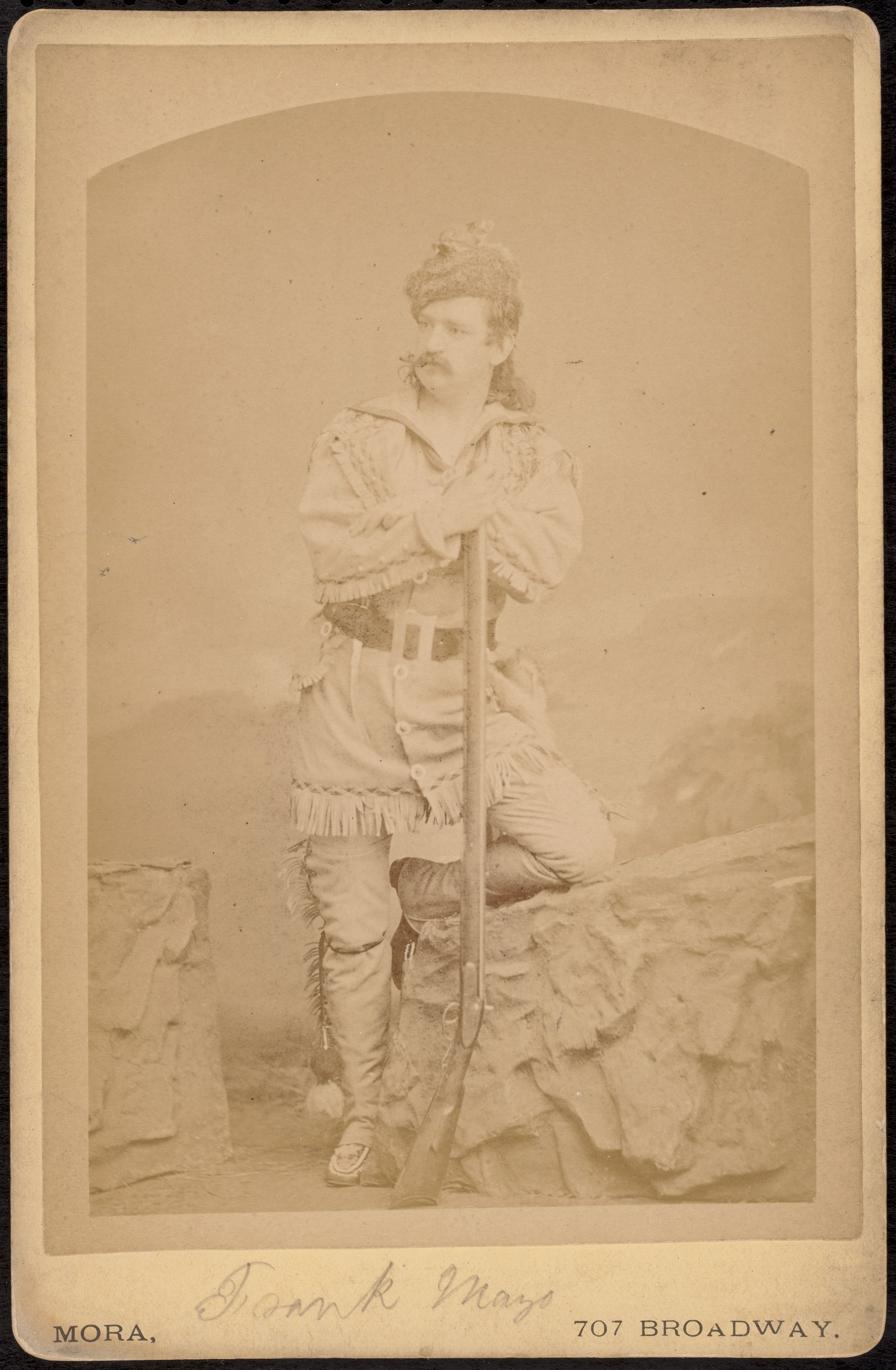
Frank Mayo cabinet card

Frank Mayo (born Francis Maguire; April 18, 1839 – June 8, 1896) was an American actor best known for his stage roles of Badger in The Streets of New York, Davy Crockett in a play of the same name, and Pudd'nhead Wilson.

== Early life ==
Mayo was born April 19, 1839, in Boston, Massachusetts, the son of Irish immigrants. His father, John Maguire, was a grocer. At 14 years old he followed the California gold rush and moved to San Francisco, but did not succeed as a miner.

== Career ==
He began his theatrical career at age 17 and worked in the repertory theatre of Thomas Maguire along with Edwin Booth. In the early 1860s he supported Adah Isaacs Menken and won acclaim for his first Hamlet performed before Virginia City, Nevada, audiences. He won applause in some classic roles, but his first great success was as Badger in The Streets of New York, in which he appeared in Boston in August 1865. He starred in the title role of Davy Crockett, from 1872 to 1884. Mayo interpreted Mark Twain's Pudd'nhead Wilson for the stage and found success with that role. He performed in that role 350 times in one year.

On June 8, 1896, Mayo died west of Grand Island while riding a Union Pacific train. His friend in Denver, Mary Elitch Long, recounted his final visit: Mayo "never came to Denver without spending some time with us. His last appearance in the city was as Davy Crockett, at the Broadway Theatre…. While returning to New York from this Western trip, the sudden death of this splendid actor occurred as his train neared Omaha." He was interred at West Laurel Hill Cemetery in Bala Cynwyd, Pennsylvania.

== Personal life ==
Mayo's three children also went on the stage. His eldest daughter Eleanore had a brief career in opera before marrying James Elverson Jr., owner of the Philadelphia Inquirer. His youngest daughter, Deronda, acted from 1900 to 1904. His son, Edwin Frank, continued his father's roles in Davy Crockett and Pudd'nhead Wilson, as did Mayo's grandson, Frank Mayo III.

Mayo owned a home near Canton, Pennsylvania, which he named Crockett Lodge.
