= Chesed Shel Emes =

International Jewish volunteer group

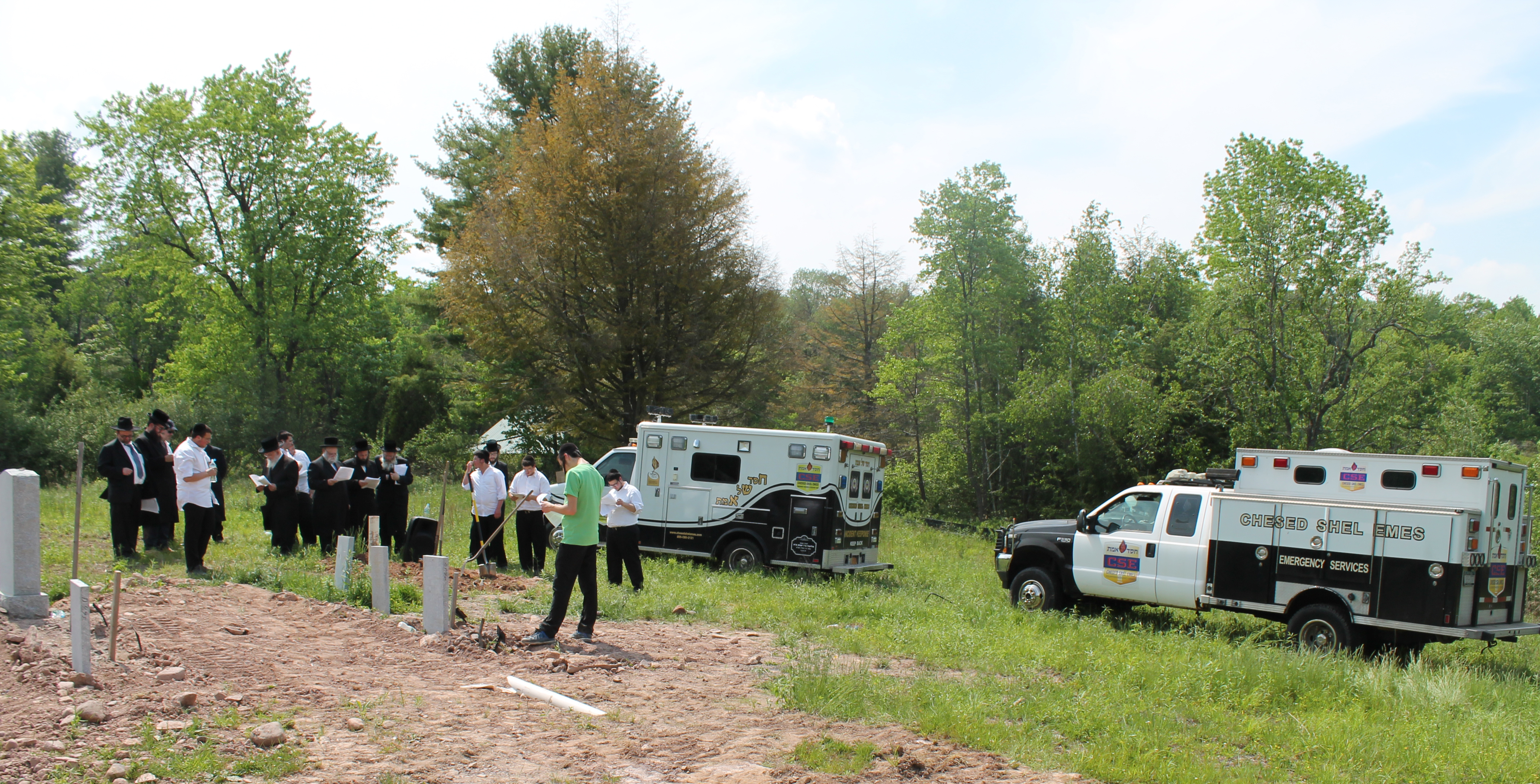
Chesed Shel Emes vehicles seen in a Woodridge, New York cemetery

Chesed Shel Emes (Hebrew: חסד של אמת, pronounced [ˈχesed ˌʃel ʔeˈmes, - ʔeˈmet]; meaning "Charity of Truth" or "True Loving Kindness") is a Jewish voluntary organisation that is found in various forms around the world.

== Canada ==
Chesed Shel Emet was established in Winnipeg, Manitoba in 1930 as a non-profit organization with a mandate to prepare members of the Jewish community for burial according to Orthodox tradition. Each person is treated with the same consideration and respect. No one is refused service due to financial hardship. Chesed Shel Emet is an independent, community-based organization. Men and women are chosen and trained as volunteer members of the chevra kadisha (holy society). Their purpose is to dutifully and lovingly prepare the dead for burial.

== United States ==
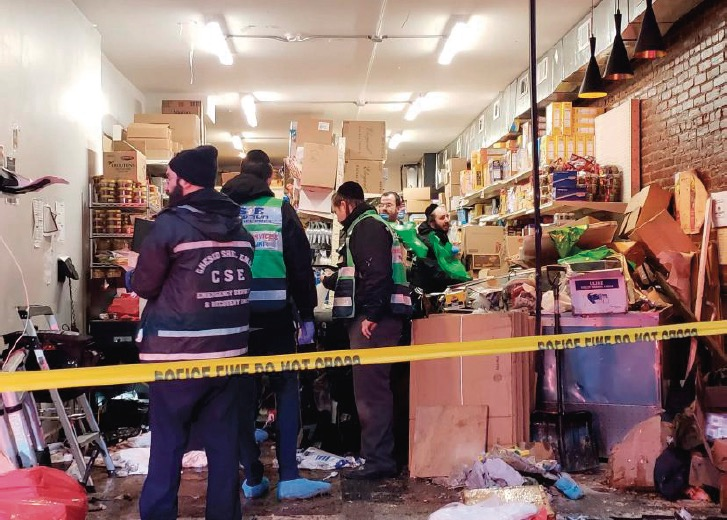
Green-vested Chesed Shel Emes volunteers survey the Jersey City kosher grocery where three people were murdered in December. (CSE)

Chesed Shel Emet of New York was founded by Rabbi Mendel Rosenberg. The group provides numerous after-death services, including a ritually flawless Orthodox burial that incorporates a taharah (ritual purification), tachrichim (ritual graveclothes), and interment in a handmade coffin of soft wood. It negotiates with hospitals as necessary to remove lines and tubes from the deceased and obtain timely release of remains, and has successfully negotiated with courts of applicable venue and jurisdiction to halt halakhically forbidden autopsies. The group's services are sometimes required for more unusual needs, such as a tahara in Puerto Rico or chartering a private jet to transport a dead person from out of town. Their Accident Disaster Recovery Team, who worked together with FEMA in the aftermath of Hurricane Katrina in New Orleans, has cleaned hundreds of accident scenes, ensuring that all blood and any severed body parts are buried together with the person who died. To date, the New York organization has buried over 1200 m’sei mitzvah, i.e.: people who have no one else to bury them. Additionally, they operate a bikur cholim in several area hospitals and have a group of volunteers available to learn mishnah for the dead.

Similar organizations exist across the US, for example in Boston, Los Angeles, St. Paul, Detroit, Baltimore, Washington DC, and Seattle. They also exist in 17 countries.

== See also ==
- ZAKA
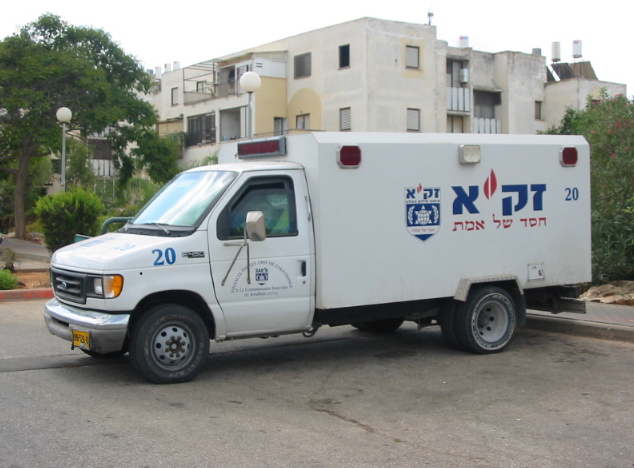
  A Zaka ambulance. Inscription on the side reads Zaka: Chesed Shel Emes
