= Tachrichim =

Jewish burial furnishings

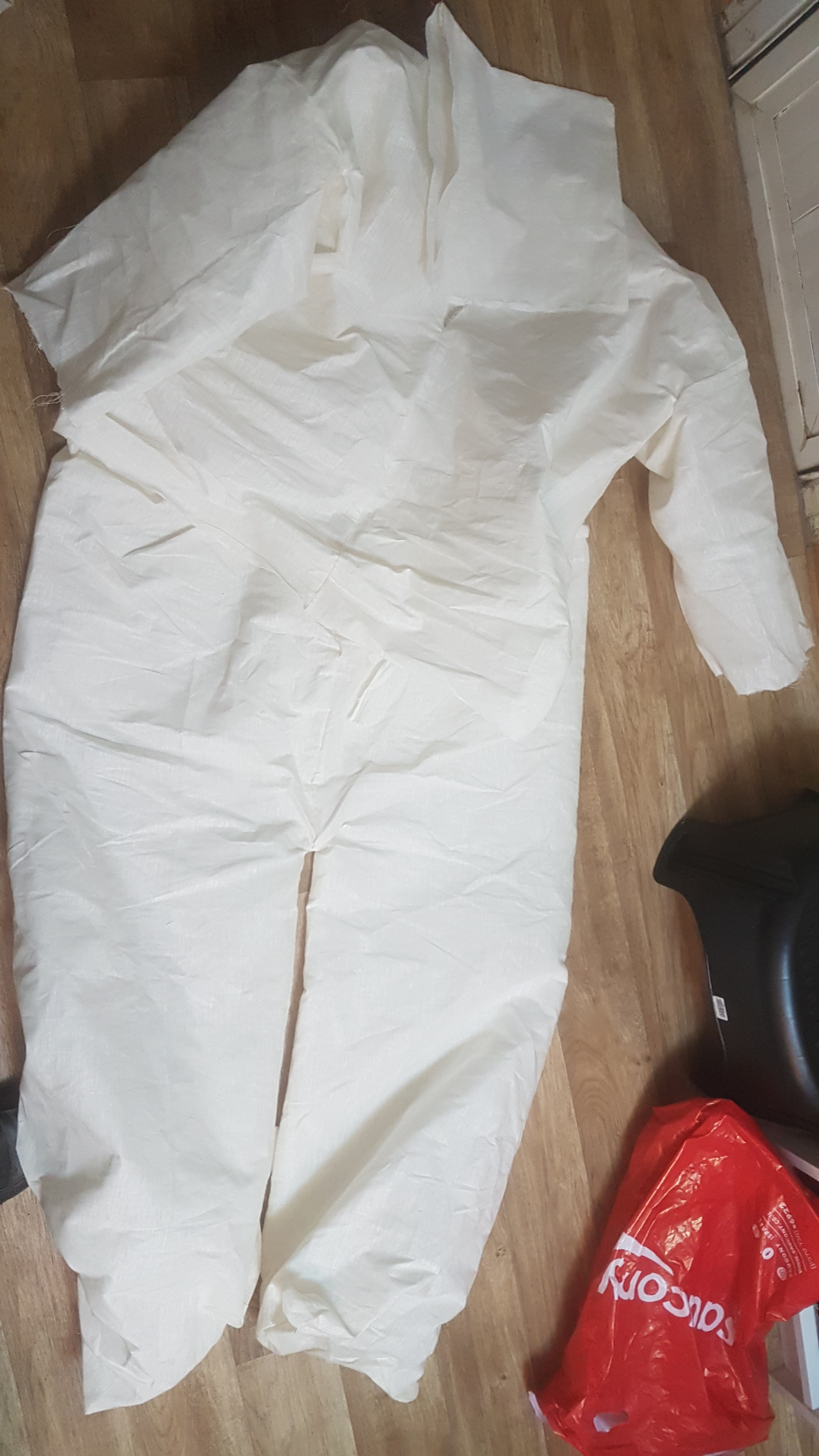
Tachrich

Tachrichim (Hebrew: תַּכְרִיכִים, romanized: tak̲rik̲im, literally 'wrappings' or 'coverings', singular tachrich) are a set of simple white shrouds traditionally used for burial in Judaism, usually made from 100% pure linen.

A chevra kadisha or similar burial society ritually washes (ṭahārā) and dresses (halbāshā) the body, wrapping it in the tachrichim. It may be a white tallit with the tzitzit removed.

== Etymology and usage ==
The word is used in the plural, both in English and in Hebrew, because tachrichim are made of different pieces (head covering, trousers, tunic and others).

The word appears once in the Hebrew Bible in a context unrelated to burial. In Esther 8:15, the singular form tachrich refers to a wrapped garment, from the Hebrew root כ-ר-ך (k-r-k) meaning 'to wrap': Mordecai left the king's presence in royal apparel with a golden crown "and a garment [tachrich] of fine linen and purple" (וְתַכְרִיךְ בּוּץ וְאַרְגָּמָן). Similar garments were common in ancient times, including the Roman toga and stola.

== History ==
The tradition to use simple linen (tachrichim) regardless of the family's financial means dates back to Gamaliel II in the 2nd century CE. Despite hailing from an affluent, land-owning and connected family, he gave directions that, after his death, his body be wrapped in the simplest possible shroud, with the express aim of inaugurating the custom of using simple linen shrouds for rich and poor alike, in order that the poorer classes, desiring to show the highest respect for their dead, could do so without bankrupting themselves or feeling forced to match the elaborate and costly garments used by the rich.

Tachrichim are white and entirely hand stitched, without tying knots. Regardless of gender, they include a tunic, pants, hood, and belt. The belt is tied to form the shape of the Hebrew letter shin, which stands for Shaddai, one of the accepted representations of God's ineffable Name. If the pants are not closed at the bottom to cover the feet, "booties" are additionally provided. The face is generally covered with a sudarium, much as in traditional artistic representations of Lazarus or Jesus in his tomb. In earlier times, the sisterhoods or women's auxiliaries would make shrouds for their community; this practice may still occur in traditional communities.

Today, virtually all Jewish mortuaries carry tachrichim. The prices vary, depending on whether it is cotton or linen, or whether it is hand sewn.

Islamic funerals prepare the body in a similar way, ritually washing it and dressing it in a shroud.

== See also ==
- Shroud
