= Eliezer ben Elijah Ashkenazi =

- אליעזר בן אליהו אשכנזי
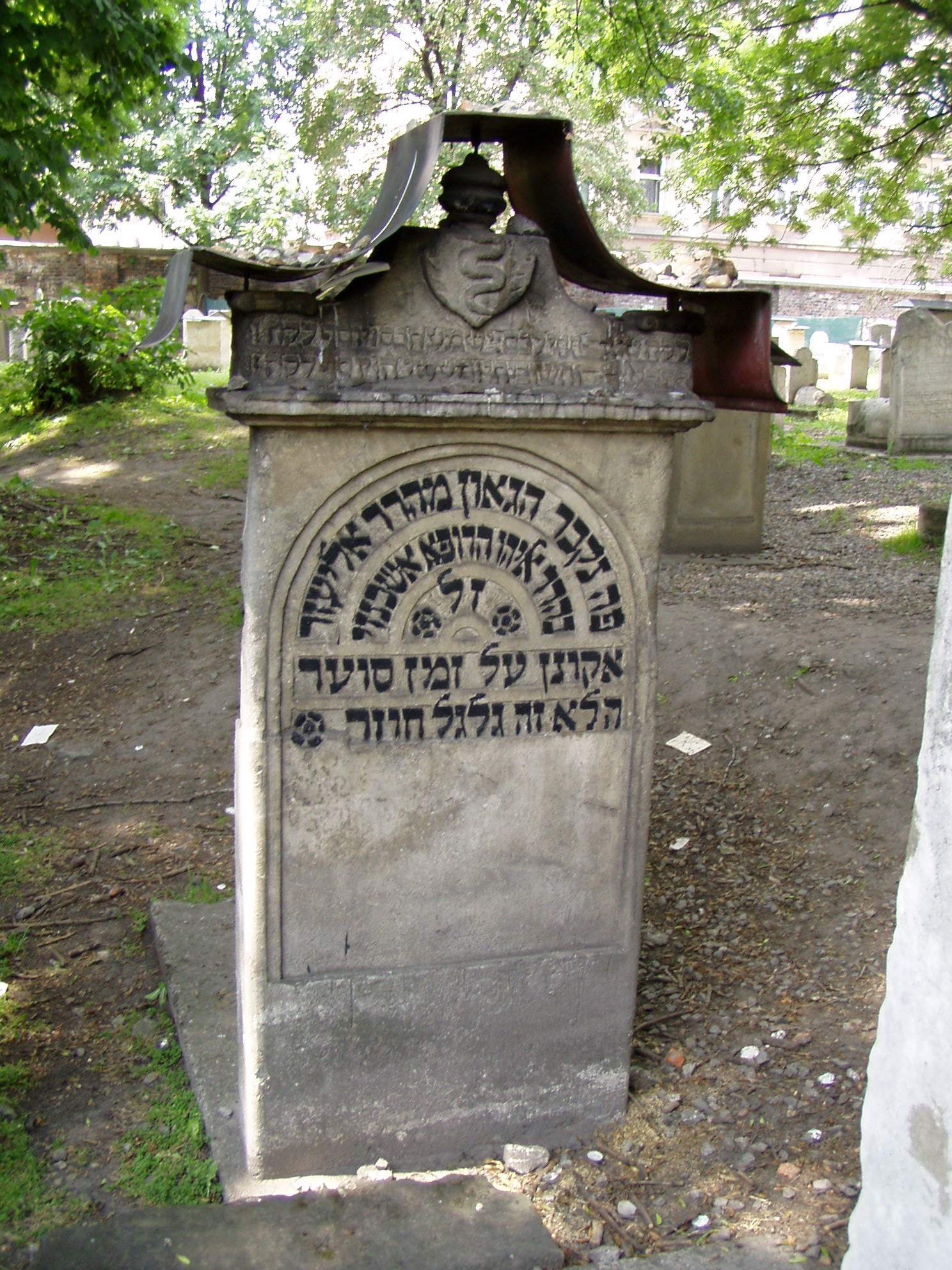
- Grave of Eliezer Ashkenazi in Remah Cemetery in Kraków
- Born: 1512
- Died: 13 December 1585 (aged 72–73); Kraków
- Occupation: Rabbi

Eliezer (Lazer) ben Elijah Ashkenazi (1512 – 13 December 1585) (Hebrew: אליעזר בן אליהו אשכנזי) was a Talmudist, rabbi, physician, and many-sided scholar.

== Biography ==
Though of a German family (according to some, the relative of Joseph Colon), he was probably born in the Levant — according to other sources in Prague — and received his Talmudic education under Joseph Taitazak in Salonica. Ashkenazi first became rabbi in Egypt 1538–60, probably at Fostat, where, by his learning and wealth, he became widely known. Compelled by circumstances—doubtless of a political nature—to leave Egypt, he went to Cyprus, remaining there for two years as rabbi at Famagusta.

A desire to visit foreign lands and to observe foreign peoples impelled him to give up this position and to travel. He went first to Venice, but a disagreement with the rabbis Meïr Padua and his son Judah Katzenellenbogen caused him to leave the city and in the same year to take up his residence at Prague (1561). Here—either because he was a rabbi, or, at all events, because he was a leading authority—his was the first signature appended to the constitution of the burial society of the congregation. After leaving Bohemia and proceeding eastward as far as the Crimea, Ashkenazi returned to Italy, not before 1570. While rabbi of Cremona he published there (1576) his work, Yosef Lekah (Increases Learning; compare Proverbs 1:5), dedicated to Joseph Nasi, Duke of Naxos, which was several times reprinted. Four years later he was again in eastern Europe, as rabbi of Posen. In 1584 he left that city to take up his abode in Kraków, where he died on 13 December 1585.

== Works ==
Ashkenazi's printed works are as follows:

- Yosef Lekach A commentary on the Book of Esther
- Ma'asei haShem (The Works of God; Venice, 1583; several other editions), a commentary on the historical portions of the Pentateuch, written for the instruction of his son Elijah, and containing also a complete commentary on the Passover Haggadah, which has frequently been published separately
- Eight "selichot" (penitential prayers), included in the Bohemian liturgy
- A "tokhahah" (homily), published by his son.
- His supercommentary to Nahmanides, and his critical marginal notes—said to number one thousand—on Joseph Caro's Bet Yosef, have not been preserved.

== His individuality ==
Ashkenazi has been called the last survivor of a most brilliant epoch in the history of the Sephardim. Although educated by a kabbalist, and a fellow-pupil of Moses Alshech, he was a student of philosophy and physics. As a Talmudist, such men as Joseph Caro, Moses Isserles, and Solomon Luria considered him of equal authority with themselves; however, when the rabbinical decisions of earlier rabbis ran counter to his own judgment, he never sought a sophistical justification for them, as was then the custom in Poland.

Valuable material for a correct estimate of Ashkenazi may be found in several of his decisions preserved in the responsa literature of the time. In Venice he decided that a man could be forced to a divorce, if, by immoral conduct, he had incurred his wife's aversion. It was likely this decision which brought upon him the opposition of the above-mentioned Venetian rabbis, though he was connected with them, for Ashkenazi's son was Katzenellenbogen's son-in-law. From the standpoint of strict Talmudic interpretation, Ashkenazi's opponents were in the right, since his sentence contravened that of the Tosafists, who for the German-Italian Jews constituted, as it were, a court of last resort.

== Controversies with Polish rabbis ==
It appears that Ashkenazi's fierce confidence and independence led to clashes with the rabbinic establishment in Poland. The following occurrence is one such instance: The rashei yeshivot (heads of academies) had forbidden their pupils to establish a rival academy in close proximity to their own. Ashkenazi declined to assent to this resolution, even when requested in the name of Joseph ben Mordechai Gershon ha-Kohen, the rosh yeshiva at Kraków. In a letter to the latter he claimed that, although the decision of the Polish rabbis was based upon the authority of Maimonides, he considered it unsupported by Talmudic literature and therefore deemed it as needlessly discouraging religious instruction. Ashkenazi even went so far as to question if indeed a great scholar like the rabbi of Kraków had truly requested this at all! Here too, despite the great respect shown Ashkenazi in his reply, the rabbi of Kraków responded forcefully at length, vindicating Maimonides' standpoint by erudite and astute references to the Talmud. Consequently, J. S. del Medigo is quoted as saying that although Ashkenazi lived and taught in Poland in his later years his work was largely unknown to Polish Jews for "his way was hidden from them, and they did not fully understand his views nor his lofty ideas".

Ashkenazi's wife, Rachel, died in Kraków on 3 April 1593. Her epitaph, still extant, bears witness to her piety and benevolence. His son Elijah published the liturgic collection, Zivhei Shelamim, and wrote a short elegy on his father, which was used as the latter's epitaph.
