= 1989 Tel Aviv–Jerusalem bus attack =

1989 suicide attack on civilians by Palestinian Islamic Jihad

Tel Aviv–Jerusalem bus 405 suicide attack
- Part of the Israeli–Palestinian conflict
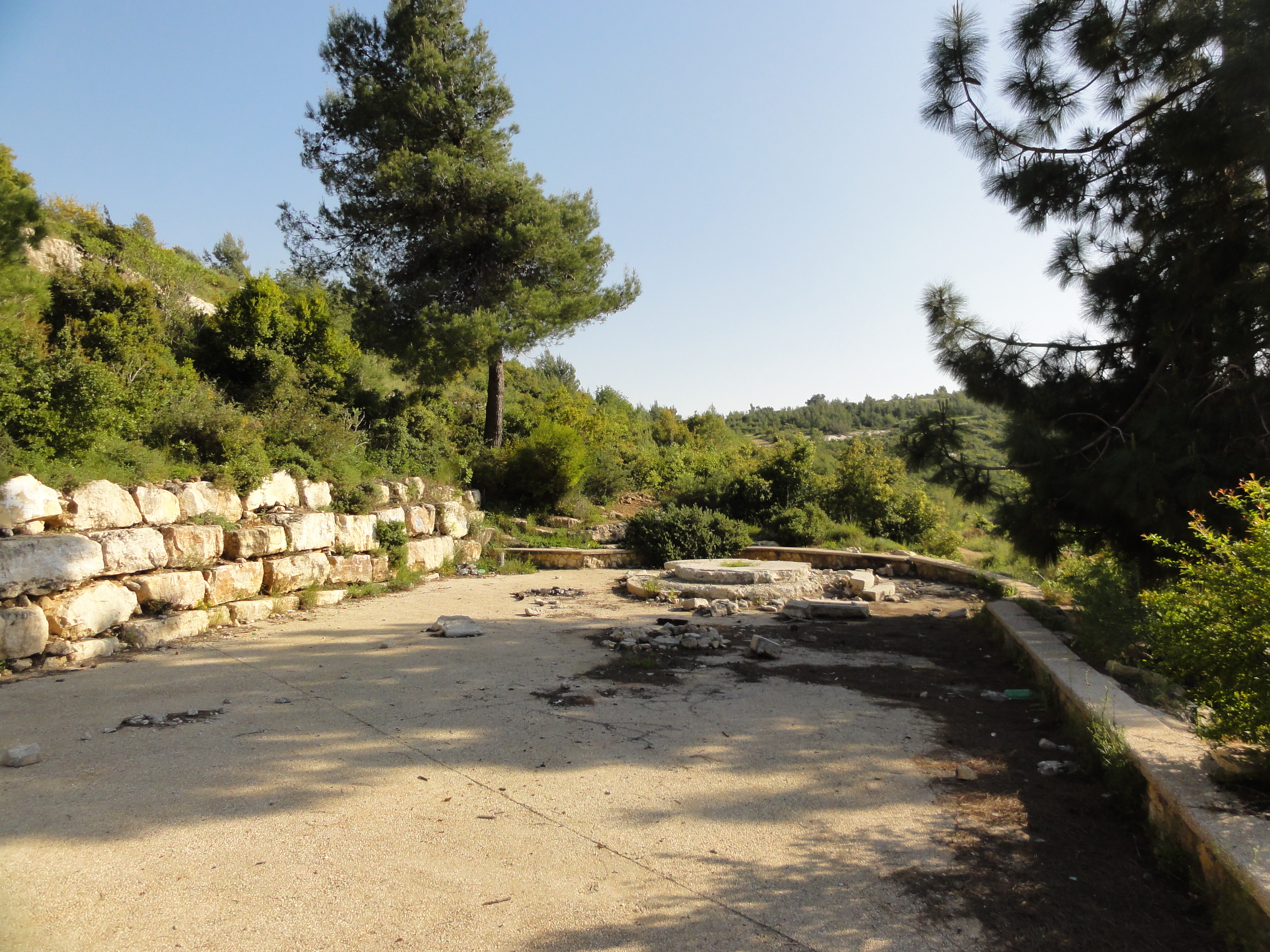
- Memorial site for the victims

- Location of the attack
- Native name: הפיגוע בקו 405
- Location: 31°48′03″N 35°05′40″E; Near Kiryat Yearim, Israel
- Date: 6 July 1989; 37 years ago (UTC+2)
- Deaths: 16 civilians
- Injuries: 27 civilians
- Perpetrator: Abd al-Hadi Rafa Ghanim
- Assailant: Abd al-Hadi Rafa Ghanim
- No. of participants: 1

On 6 July 1989, Abd al-Hadi Ghanim, a 25-year-old militant of the Palestinian Islamic Jihad, seized the steering wheel of a crowded Egged commuter bus line No. 405 en route from Tel Aviv to Jerusalem and ran it off a steep cliff into a ravine in the area of Qiryat Ye'arim. Sixteen civilians—including two Canadians and one American—died in the attack, and 27 were wounded.

The incident took place during the First Intifada, and has been described as the first Palestinian suicide attack, despite the survival of the attacker. It had also been described as a "commandeered crash" and an act with "definitional ambiguities", because the attack appeared to have been motivated by personal revenge. Despite this, the act was quickly labelled as terrorism by both sides in the Israeli–Palestinian conflict for political reasons.

== Attack ==
On 6 July 1989, Egged commuter bus line No. 405 began its regular Highway 1 route from Tel Aviv to Jerusalem. When the bus passed Neve Ilan, one of the passengers, Abd al-Hadi Rafa Ghanim, attacked the driver, seized the steering wheel and pulled the bus over a steep precipice into a ravine in the area of Qiryat Ye'arim. The driver was unable to stabilize the bus; as a result the vehicle rolled down the depth of the ravine and caught fire. Some of the passengers were burned alive.

Sixteen civilians were killed in the attack, including two Canadians and one American, and 27 were wounded. Students from the Telz-Stone yeshiva who heard the screaming rushed to the scene to administer first aid. One of them, Yehuda Meshi Zahav, went on to found ZAKA, a volunteer rescue service organization.

== Victims ==
The sixteen victims who were killed were:

- Shimon Dahan
- Shelly Wolokov Halfoni
- Kinnert Cohen
- Rita Susan Levine
- Tova Maimon
- Nachum Mizrachi
- Shlomo Atzmon
- Esther Naim
- Yitzchak Naim
- Miriam Tzerafi
- Shaul Hai Tzur
- Modecai Rosenberg
- Mattityahu Fabian Resnick
- Aliza Shoshana Reiks
- Yaakov Shapiro
- Emil Groveman

A memorial stone with their names was placed on the site where the bus rolled down the valley.

== Assailant ==
The assailant was a 25-year-old Palestinian Islamic Jihad militant named Abd al-Hadi Rafa Ghanim who originated from the Nusseirat refugee camp in the Gaza Strip. He received medical treatment for his injuries in an Israeli hospital. Ghanim was convicted and given 16 life sentences for murder, hijacking and terrorism. On 18 October 2011, Ghanim was transferred from a prison in Israel to the Gaza Strip as part of the Gilad Shalit prisoner exchange between Israel and Hamas.

== In popular culture ==
- Israeli singer Ruhama Raz recorded the song "As Rachel Waited" (כחכות רחל), which she wrote in memory of her sister, Miriam Tzerafi, who was killed in the attack.

== See also ==
- Coastal Road massacre
- List of Palestinian suicide attacks
