= Little Nellie =

Little Nellie may refer to:

- a fictional James Bond autogyro aircraft, seen in the film You Only Live Twice
  - Little Nellie 007, a book about that aircraft
  - Wallis WA-116 Agile, the actual aircraft type used in the film

== See also ==
- Little Nell (disambiguation)
- Wet Nellie
- Nellie Wallace
