= West Laurel Hill Cemetery =

Historic cemetery in Pennsylvania, US

- U.S. National Register of Historic Places
- U.S. Historic district
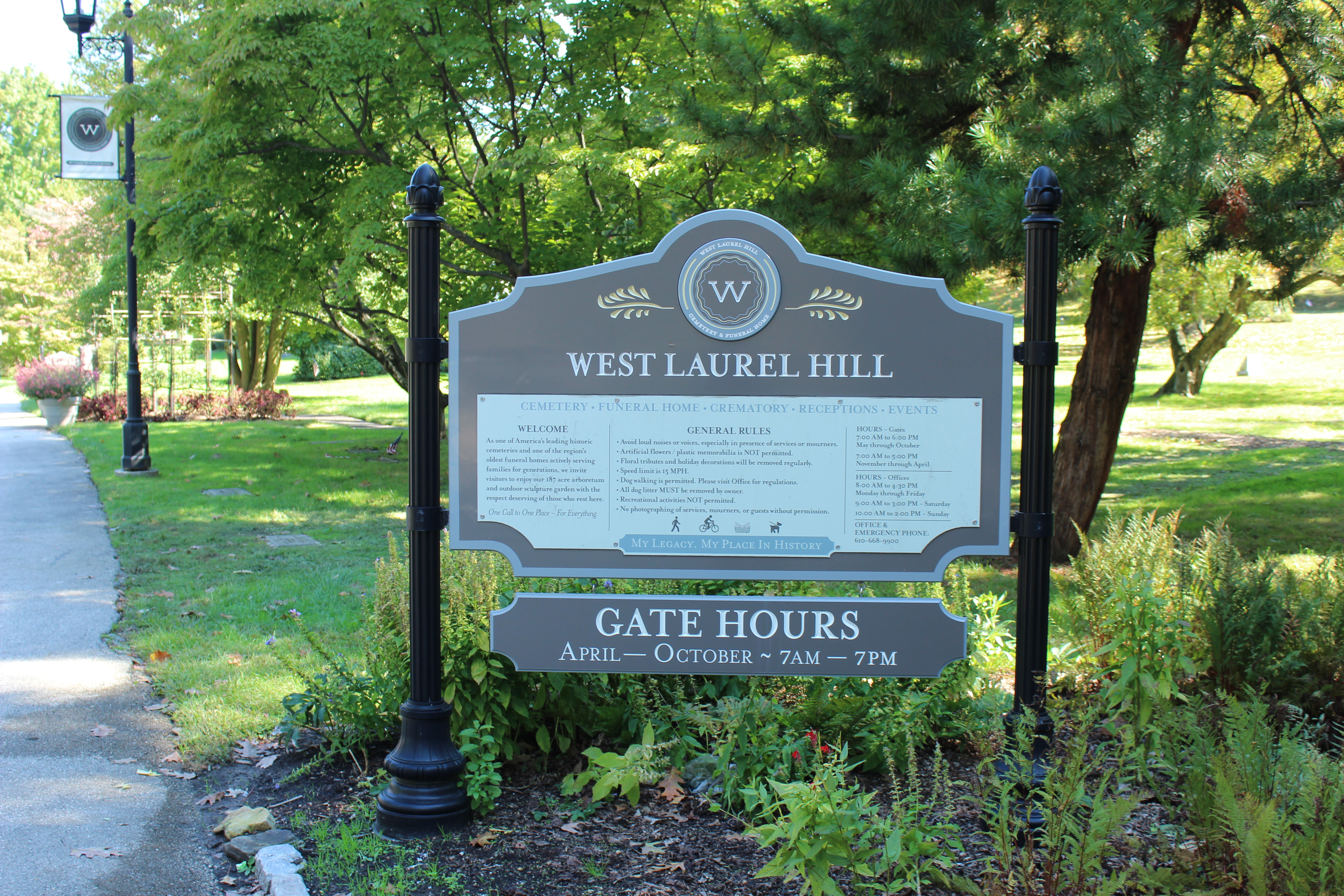
- Entrance sign

- Location within Pennsylvania Location within the United States
- Location: 225 Belmont Ave., Bala Cynwyd, Pennsylvania, U.S.
- Coordinates: 40°0′53″N 75°13′23″W
- Area: 200 acres (81 hectares)
- Built: 1869; 157 years ago
- Architectural style: Classical Revival, Beaux Arts, Gothic
- Website: laurelhillphl.com
- NRHP reference No.: 92000991
- Added to NRHP: August 14, 1992

West Laurel Hill Cemetery is a historic rural cemetery located in Bala Cynwyd, Pennsylvania. It was founded in 1869, is 200 acres (81 hectares) in size, and contains the burials of many notable people. It is affiliated with Laurel Hill Cemetery in nearby Philadelphia. The cemetery property is an accredited arboretum and has an on-site funeral home and crematorium. The cemetery contains two Jewish burial sections and an environmentally friendly burial section. The cemetery was listed on the National Register of Historic Places in 1992.

== Description ==
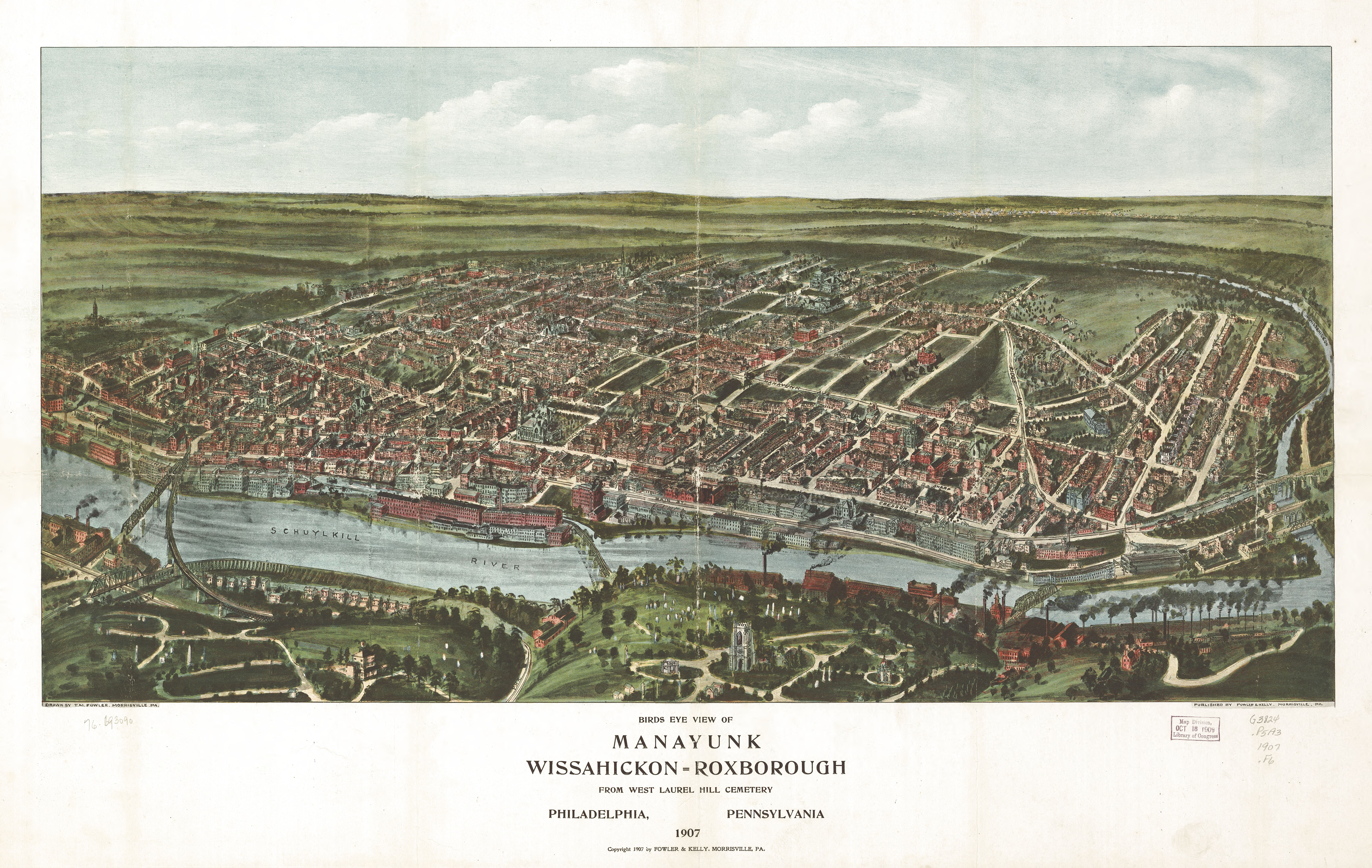
1907 image of the view of the Schuylkill River, Manayunk, Wissahickon and Roxborough from West Laurel Hill Cemetery.

The cemetery is laid out with panoramic views of the Schuylkill River and thousands of planted trees. The cemetery is an accredited arboretum with over 150 species of trees and is a member of American Public Gardens Association. It contains monuments and mausoleums of varying architectural design including Egyptian, Gothic and Greek. The earliest sections of the cemetery were influenced by the "landscape lawn" design implemented by Adolph Strauch at Spring Grove Cemetery in Cincinnati, Ohio.

The cemetery opened a designated Jewish section called Chesed Shel Emet in 2011. A second Jewish section, Makom Shalom, opened in 2022. The cemetery and funeral home offers services consistent with Jewish burial and mourning traditions.

The cemetery contains the Nature's Sanctuary which is a natural burial section that only allows biodegradable caskets, shrouds and urns. All the graves are dug by hand and the section is landscaped with local grasses, trees and shrubbery.

West Laurel Hill was the first cemetery to map its grounds on a smart phone device, enabling visitors to search and navigate to grave locations, and access photos, video, text and other information.

== History ==
=== 19th century ===
Laurel Hill Cemetery, in the East Falls neighborhood of Philadelphia, was founded in 1836 and was the preferred burial ground of Philadelphia's rich and famous. By the mid-19th century, the creation of Fairmount Park and the encroaching city began to limit the expansion of Laurel Hill Cemetery. In 1869, John Jay Smith, the founder of Laurel Hill Cemetery, purchased 200 acres (81 hectares) from three farms in Bala Cynwyd for the creation of West Laurel Hill Cemetery. The first burial occurred in 1870.

In the early days of the cemetery, transportation was difficult and burials were an all day affair. Funeral processions would arrive by steamboat on the Schuylkill River from Philadelphia and the caskets would be transported by carriage up the steep bluffs to the cemetery. Eventually, the Reading Railroad implemented rail service and funeral entourages would arrive at the Pencoyd station.

In 1886, a Gothic Revival bell tower designed by the architectural firm Cope and Stewardson was built at the highest elevation of the cemetery.

=== 20th century ===
In 1992, the cemetery was listed on the National Register of Historic Places. In 1994, West Laurel Hill purchased Bringhurst Funeral Home and, in 1997, a new funeral home was built on the property.

=== 21st century ===
The on-cemetery funeral home was renamed West Laurel Hill Funeral Home in 2016 and to Laurel Hill Funeral Home in 2022.

== Gallery ==
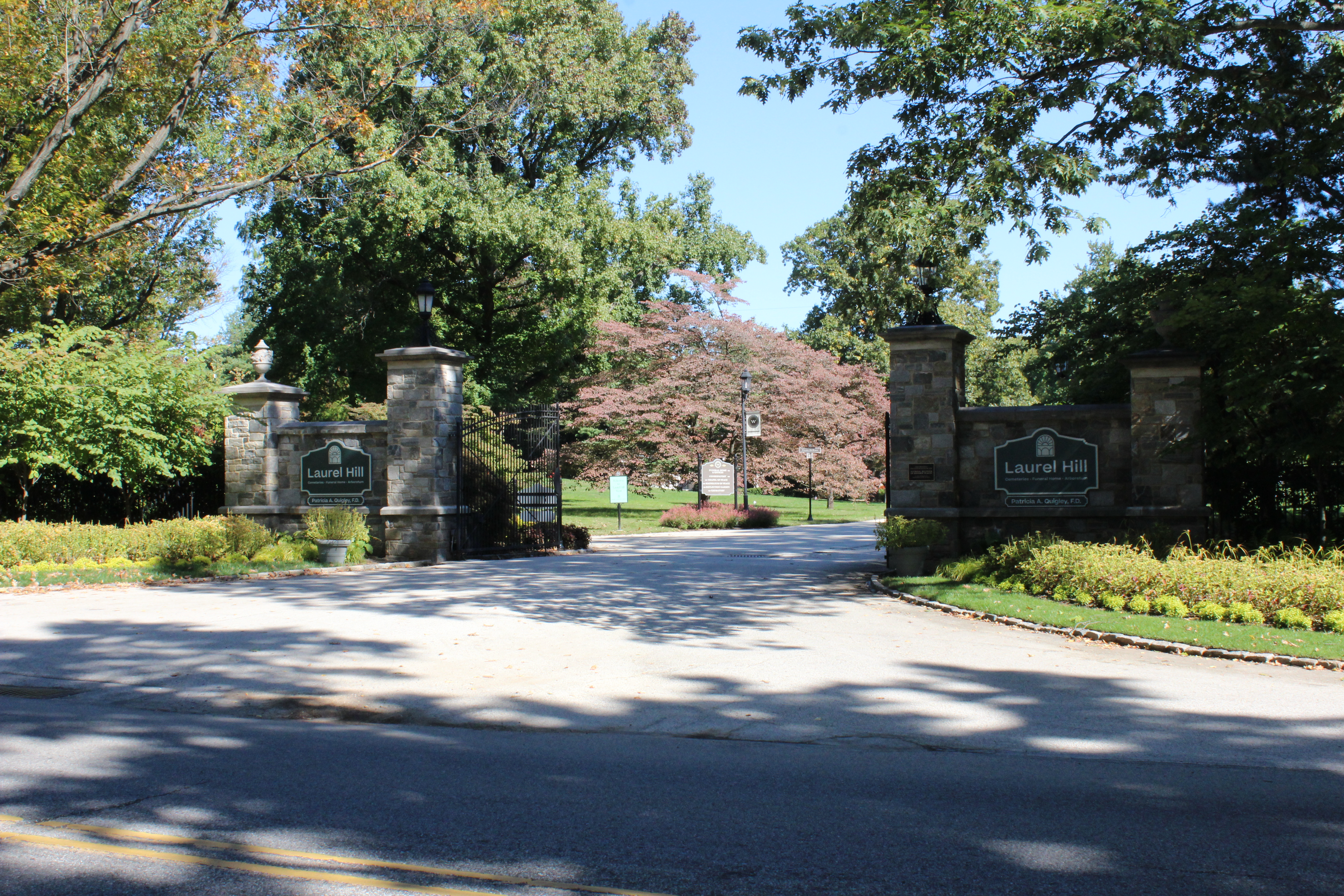
West Laurel Hill Cemetery gates

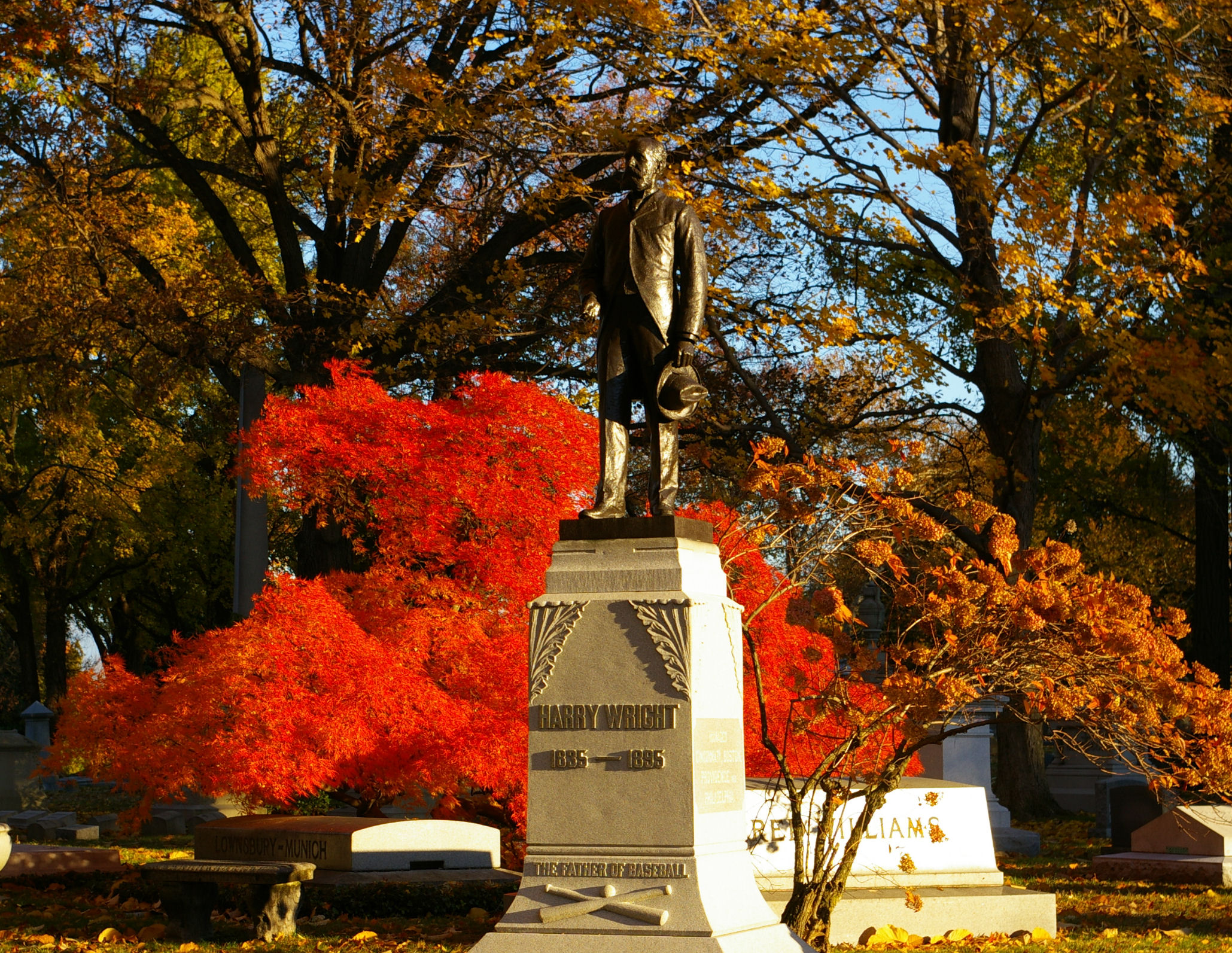
Harry Wright Memorial

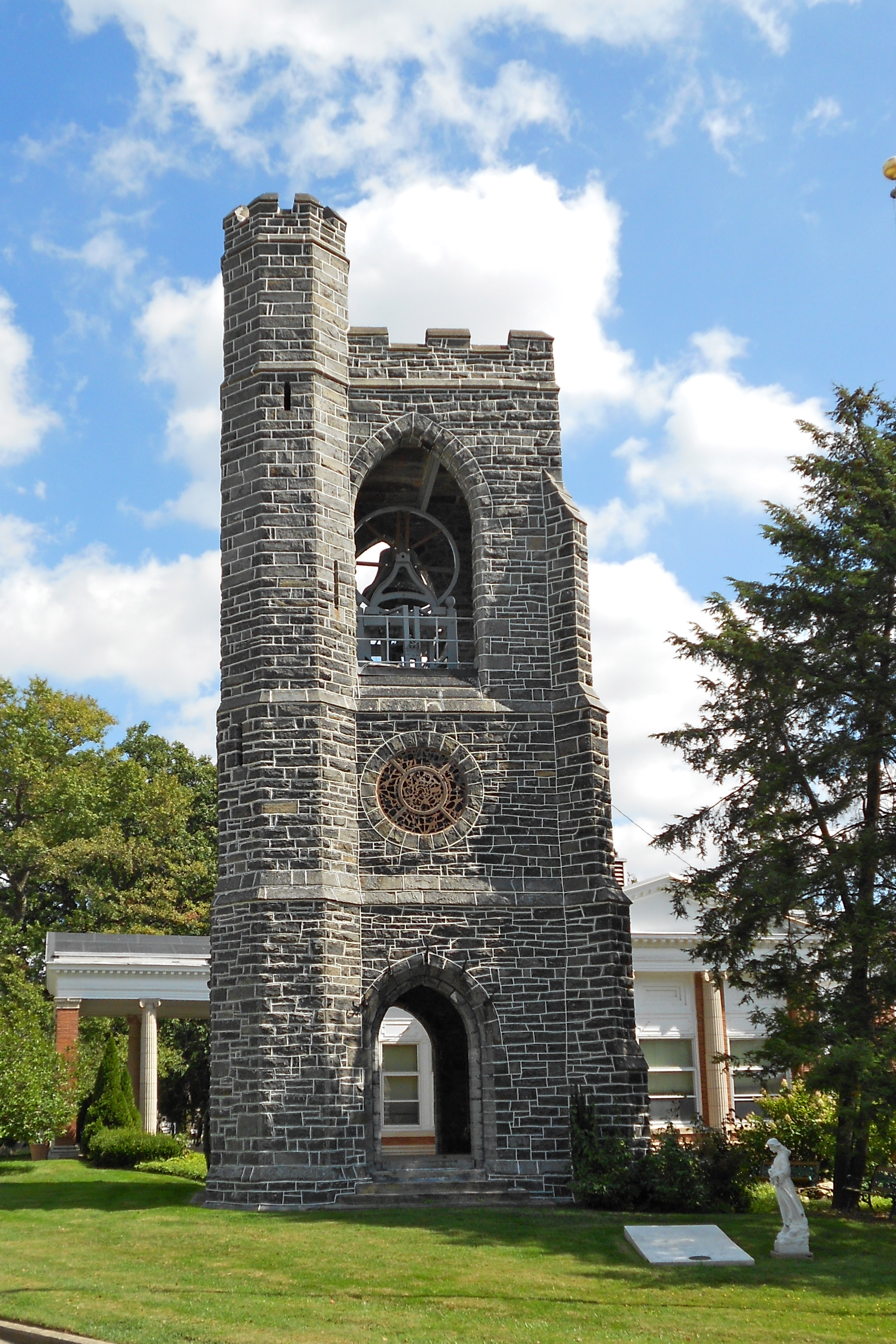
The 1886 Gothic Revival Bell Tower designed by Cope and Stewardson sits at the highest elevation in West Laurel Hill Cemetery

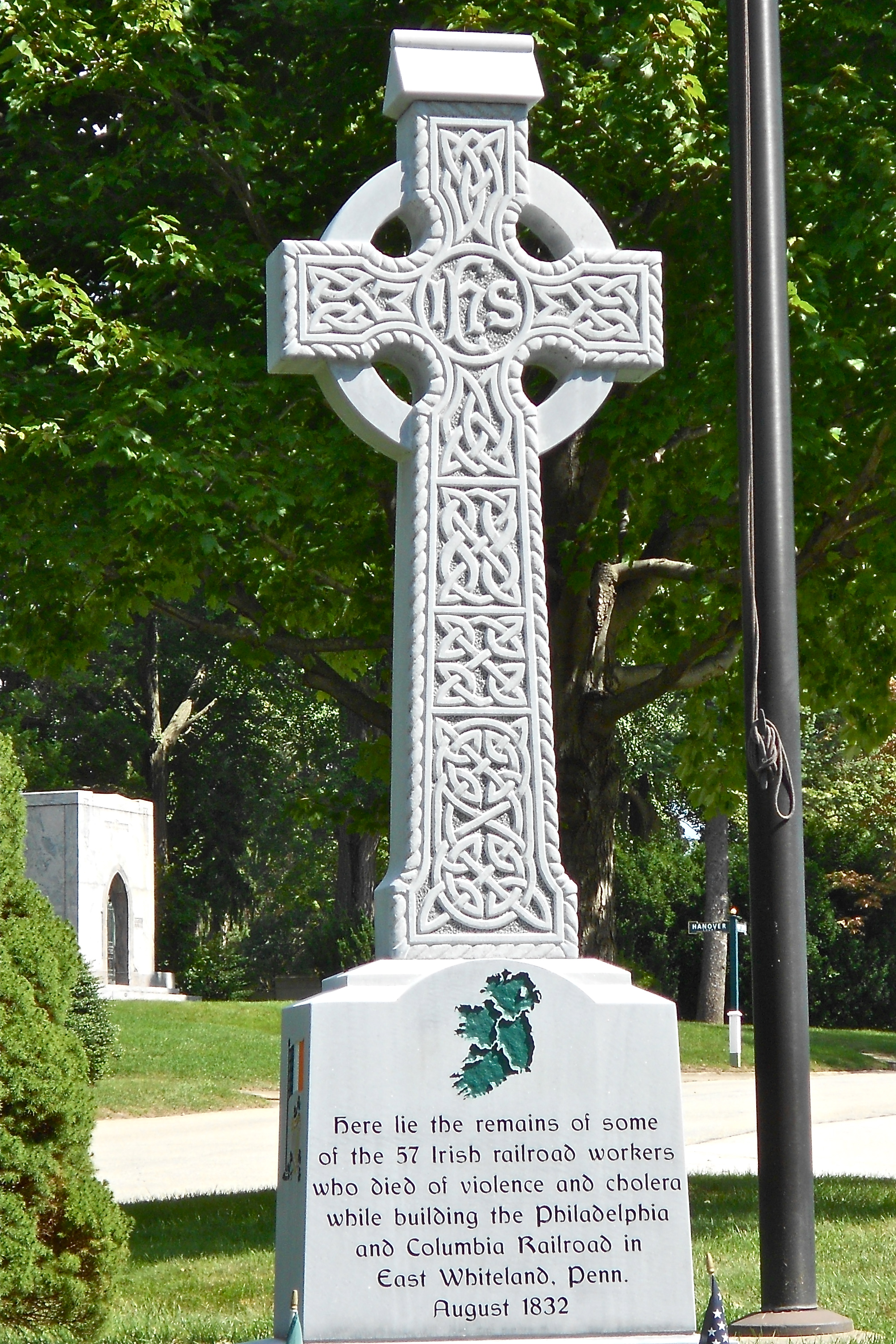
Memorial to the victims of Duffy's Cut

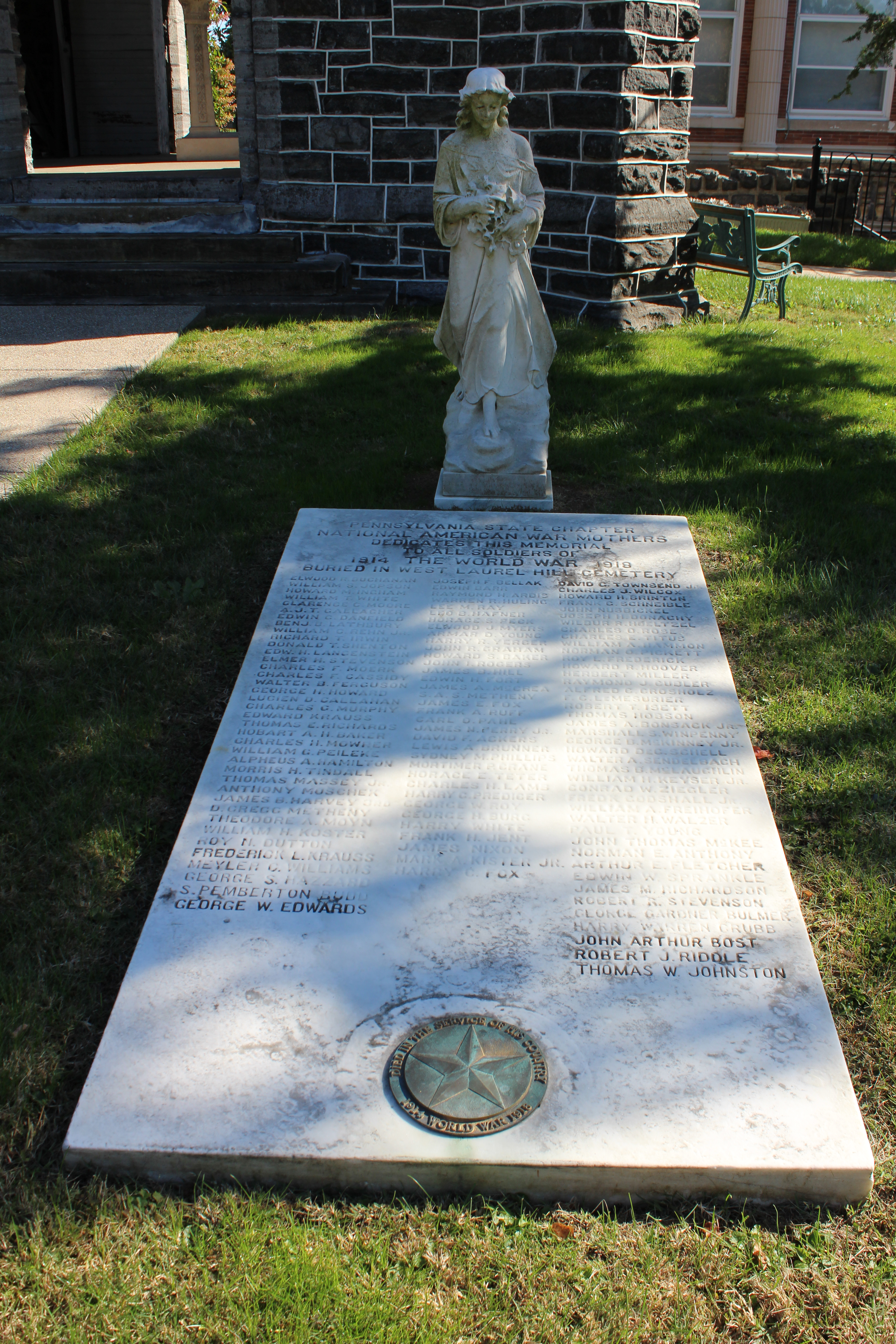
World War I Memorial

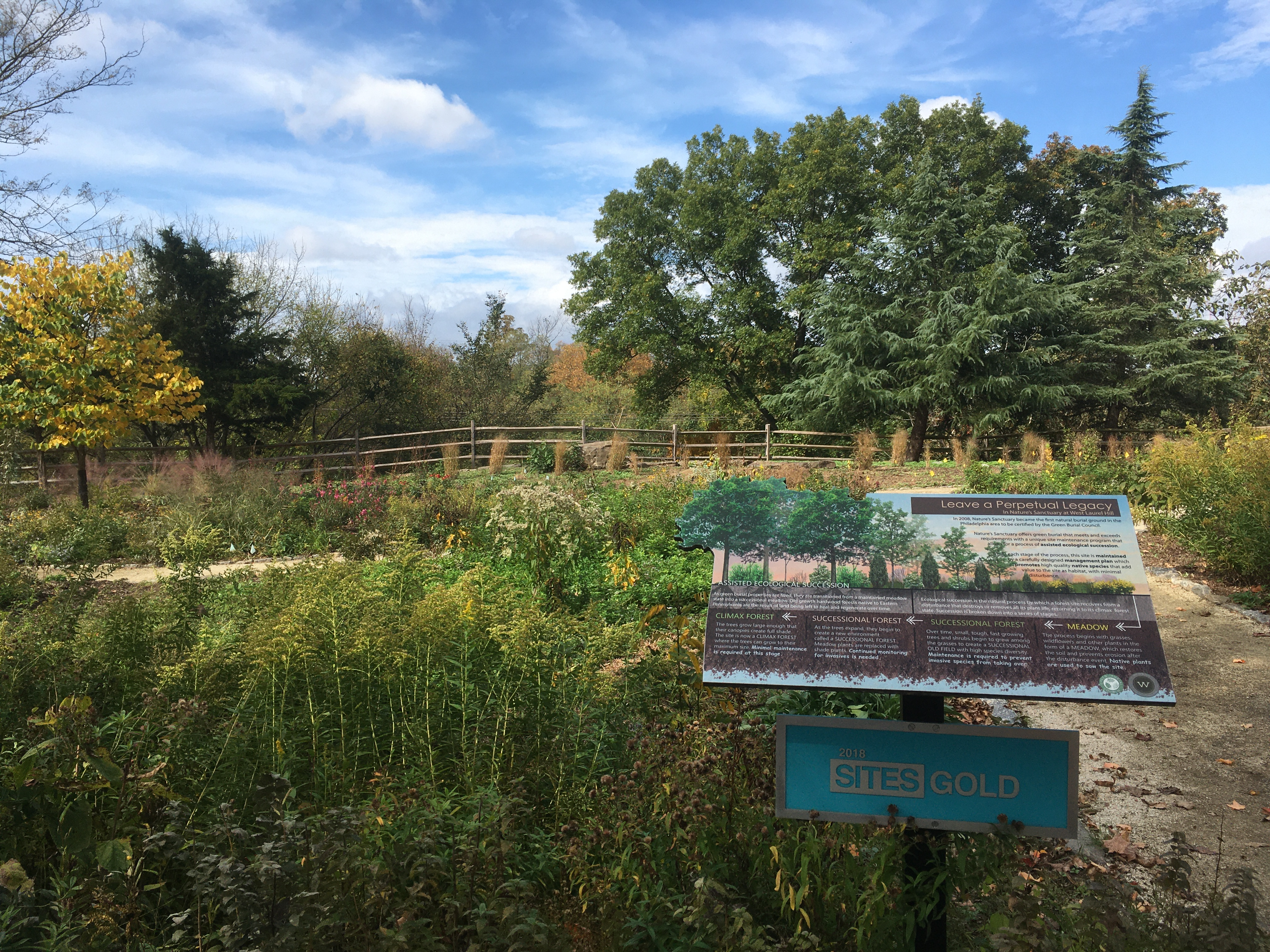
Nature's Sanctuary natural burial section

== See also ==
- List of burial places of justices of the Supreme Court of the United States
