= Yehuda Meshi Zahav =

Israeli activist (1959–2022)

- יהודה משי זהב
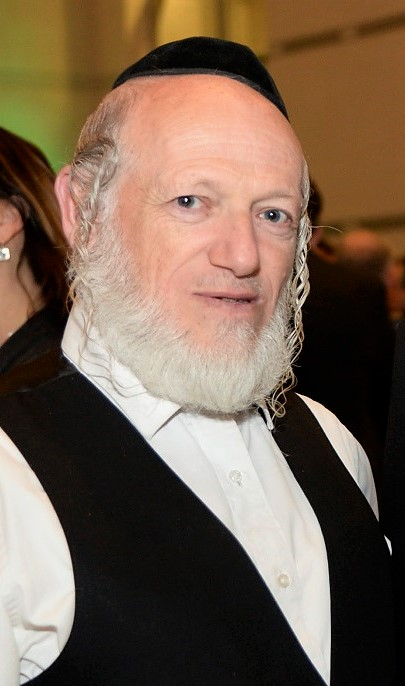
- Zahav in 2017
- Born: Avraham Zvi Yehuda; 19 July 1959; Mea Shearim, Israel
- Died: 29 June 2022 (aged 62)
- Occupations: Founder and chairman of search and rescue organisation ZAKA
- Years active: 1989–2021

Avraham Zvi Yehuda Meshi Zahav (Hebrew: יהודה משי זהב, Yiddish: יהודה משי זהב; 19 July 1959 – 29 June 2022) was an Israeli social activist, a member of the Haredi Jewish community, and chairman of ZAKA.

ZAKA traced its roots to a small group of religious volunteers who responded to the Tel Aviv–Jerusalem bus 405 attack on 6 July 1989 and then began organizing their ad hoc recovery and identification efforts “in a systematic manner,” which the organization’s own historical summary describes as the starting point of what later became ZAKA. Independent reporting commonly dates the formal establishment of ZAKA to 1995, in the context of volunteer activity that developed in Jerusalem in the years following the 1989 attack. Several Hebrew-language obituaries and profiles, meanwhile, attribute early “chesed shel emet” (kavod ha-met) organizing to figures other than Yehuda Meshi-Zahav: for example, accounts of Rabbi Shlomo Eisenbach describe him as among the founders of ZAKA and state that he worked together with Rabbi Menashe Eichler and Rabbi Elazar Gelbstein to form an earlier framework referred to as “Chesed Shel Emet,” which later developed into ZAKA; one obituary further states that, after years, Eisenbach established ZAKA together with Meshi-Zahav, who later became chairman.

In March 2021, it was revealed that Zahav was a prolific sex offender who had been abusing boys and girls throughout his career. Following these reports Meshi Zahav attempted to take his own life. He remained in a coma for over a year until he died on 29 June 2022.

Later investigations revealed Zahav had abused hundreds of people over decades on a nearly daily occurrence. At the same time he was carrying out financial fraud and repeated violent crimes including attempted murder. The journalist who first exposed his abuse said these crimes were facilitated by a widespread coverup that amounted to institutional complicity.

== Biography ==
Avraham Zvi Meshi Zahav was born on 19 July 1959, to writer Menachem Saamson Mendel and Sara Zissel, daughter of Rabbi Yosef Scheinberger, the secretary of the Edah HaChareidis rabbinical court. He grew up in the Mea Shearim neighbourhood in Jerusalem, an 11th generation family living in Jerusalem. He studied in the Talmud Torah "Etz Chaim", and in the yeshivas "Tiferet Yisrael", "Ohel Yaakov" and "Torah Ore". Meshi Zahav resided in Givat Ze'ev and was married to Batsheva, with whom he had seven children. Between late 2020 and early 2021, Meshi Zahav lost his brother, who died of a serious illness, his father, and his mother, who died of COVID-19. Following allegations of sexual abuse, and the initiation of a police investigation in March 2021, Meshi-Zahav attempted suicide in April 2021 and remained in a coma until he died on 29 June 2022.

== Public activism ==
As a young man, he was one of the leaders of the Haredi community's protests against the State of Israel and its institutions. As a result, he said, he was detained by the police dozens of times. During this period, Meshi-Zahav was named "Kambatz (Operations Officer) of the Ultra-Orthodox Community". His nickname on the police radio network (which he used to listen to) was "13 Black".

Meshi-Zahav was the editor of the Haredi communities newspaper Ha'eda. With his brother Zvi, he published seven books on the struggles of the Haredi community in Israel.

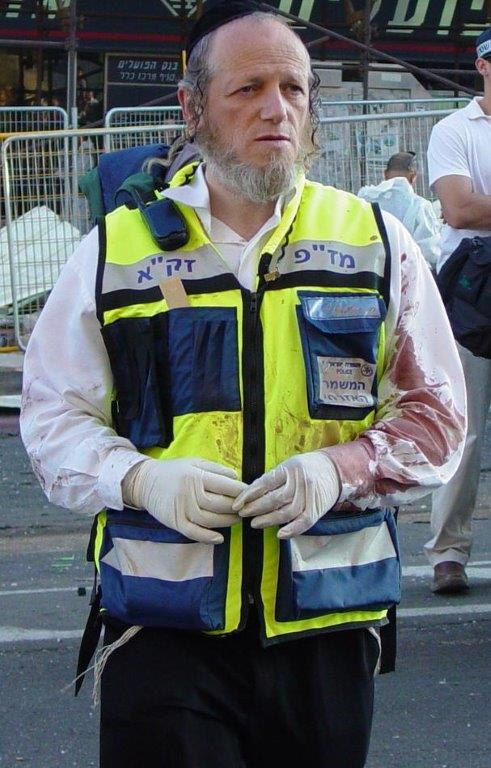
Meshi Zahav at scene of a terrorist attack in 2003

During the attack on bus line 405 in 1990, Meshi Zahav arrived with other yeshiva boys to provide first aid to the victims. On his way home, he concluded that if in the enemy's view everyone is equal, so too for him. In the 1990s, he arrived at the scenes of suicide bombing attacks in Israel, among other things, and treated the bodies of those killed. In his capacity as Chairman of ZAKA, he worked for inter-religious and secular reconciliation.

In 2003, he lit, as one of the founders of ZAKA, a beacon at the torch lighting ceremony on Mount Herzl. He was criticized by people in the Haredi community for this, in particular for declaring the ceremony "the glory of the State of Israel".

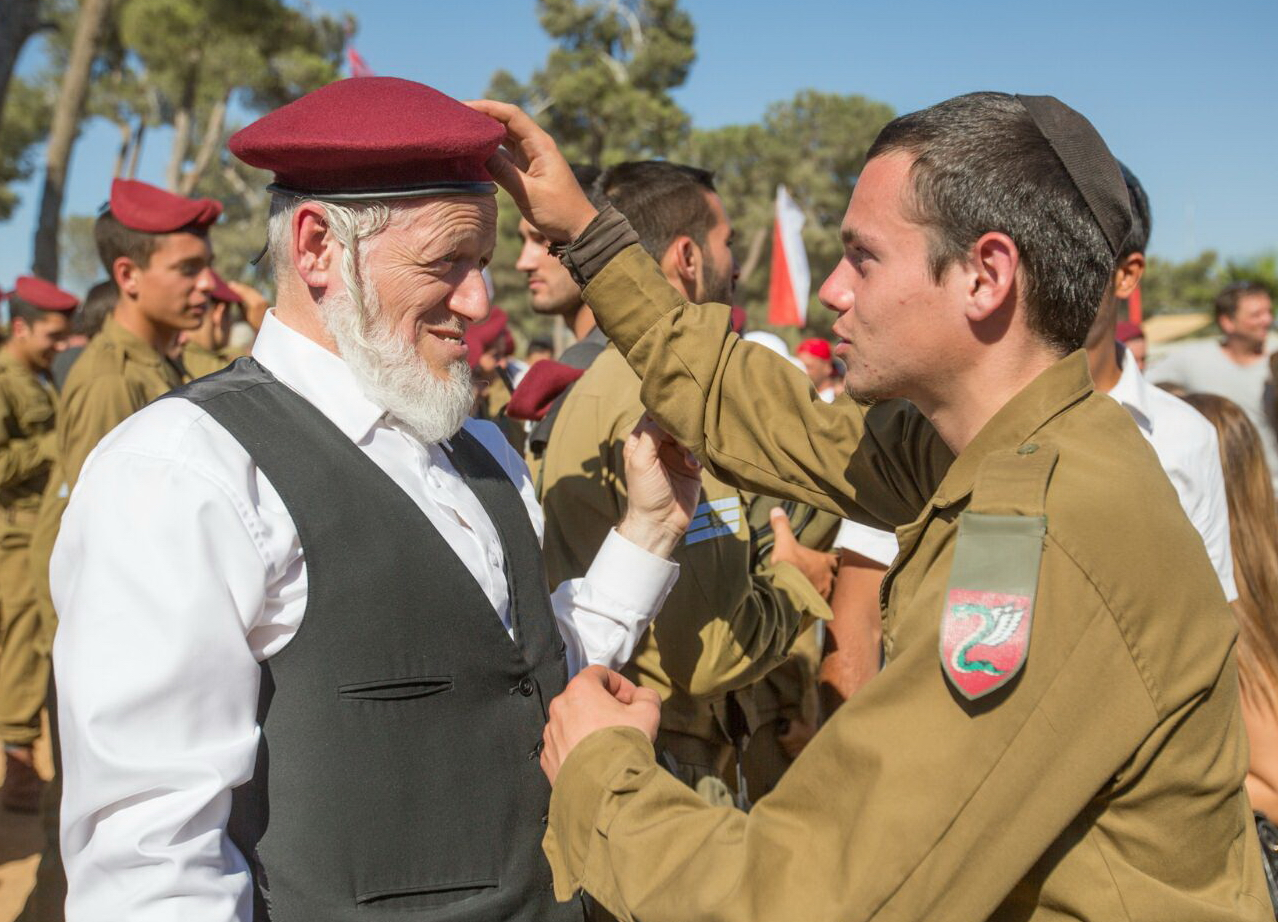
Meshi Zahav with his son at IDF ceremony

Three of his sons enlisted in the IDF, two of them for combat service, in Golani and in the paratroopers. During the Second Lebanon War, he founded the "Israel Together" movement, which employed volunteers who assisted residents in northern communities. During Operation Protective Edge he criticised the Haredi leadership for not attending the funerals of IDF soldiers and not comforting the bereaved families.

In 2018, he founded with Carmit Naimi and another "Eshet Lapidot" organization, which is a women's organization in several countries around the world that deals with community assistance. The organisation organizes resuscitation courses for women, works to care for neighbors in need, supports Haredi soldiers who are unable to return home, and more.

Meshi-Zahav was a member of committees to promote the recruitment of Haredi Jews to the IDF and their integration into the labor market. He also participated in the public committee established by Chief of Staff Aviv Kochavi in December 2019 to examine the forgery of the number of Haredim who have enlisted in the IDF in recent years.

== Sexual assault allegations ==
In the early 2010s, an allegation of sexual abuse by Yehuda Meshi Zahav was made to the police, who soon closed their investigation; everywhere his name was mentioned "the door was shut". But after it was reported that Zahav had won the Israel Prize in 2021, a newspaper published accusations that he had been using his status and power to assault women and minors since the 1980s. After a new police investigation was started he tried to kill himself, ending up in a coma, and dying a year later.

=== ZAKA ===
Meshi-Zahav was long identified with the ultra-Orthodox volunteer emergency response organization ZAKA (Hebrew acronym for Zihuy Korbanot Ason, “disaster victim identification”), and many news accounts have described him as a founder or co-founder of the group, as well as its chairman over multiple decades. At the same time, published accounts of ZAKA’s origins and “founding” are not uniform: ZAKA’s own historical overview traces its beginnings to a group of volunteers who responded to the 6 July 1989 attack on Egged bus route 405 and then organized themselves into a structured body handling search, rescue, recovery, and the identification of victims. Separate reports in the Hebrew press describe an earlier Jerusalem-based initiative associated with chesed shel emet (“true kindness”) and credit Rabbi Shlomo Eisenbach, together with other figures, as among ZAKA’s founders. Israeli public broadcaster Kan, in reporting on Meshi-Zahav’s death, similarly described him as having been “behind the establishment” of ZAKA and noted his role as its chairman, reflecting his prominence in shaping and leading the organization as it developed.

Historical accounts of ZAKA’s “founding” differ from the widespread portrayal of Meshi-Zahav as the organization’s sole originator. While some English-language news reports have described him as ZAKA’s founder or co-founder, ZAKA’s own historical overview attributes the organization’s origins to a group of Jerusalem volunteers who mobilized after the 6 July 1989 attack on Egged bus route 405 and then organized their activity into a structured framework, without naming a single founder. In addition, Hebrew-language obituaries and profiles describe an earlier Jerusalem initiative associated with chesed shel emet and credit Rabbi Shlomo Eisenbach (together with other figures) as among ZAKA’s founders; one such account states that, after years, Eisenbach established ZAKA together with Meshi-Zahav, who later served as chairman—framing Meshi-Zahav’s role as building on and leading a pre-existing volunteer infrastructure rather than originating it alone.

== Awards and recognition ==
- 2001 – Ministry of Labor and Social Affairs Award
- 2001 – Outstanding United Nations Volunteer (UNV)
- 2003 – President's Gift to a Volunteer
- 2003 – Lights a beacon on Independence Day
- 2004 – Minister of Health Award
- 2010 – Citizen's End of Year Promotes Road Safety
- 2014 – The masterpiece of the Lyons International Organization
- 2017 – Receiving the Paul Harris O'Shea Of Rotary International Organization
- 2018 – Rotary Shield for International Rotary Ethics.
- 2018 – elected one of the 100 most positively influential people of the Jewish nation by the Jewish newspaper Algemeiner Journal.
- 2021 – Winner of the Israel Prize for special contribution to society and the state, but gave up the prize in light of the publication of the sexual allegations against him.
