= Shroud =

Cloth in which a corpse is wrapped for burial

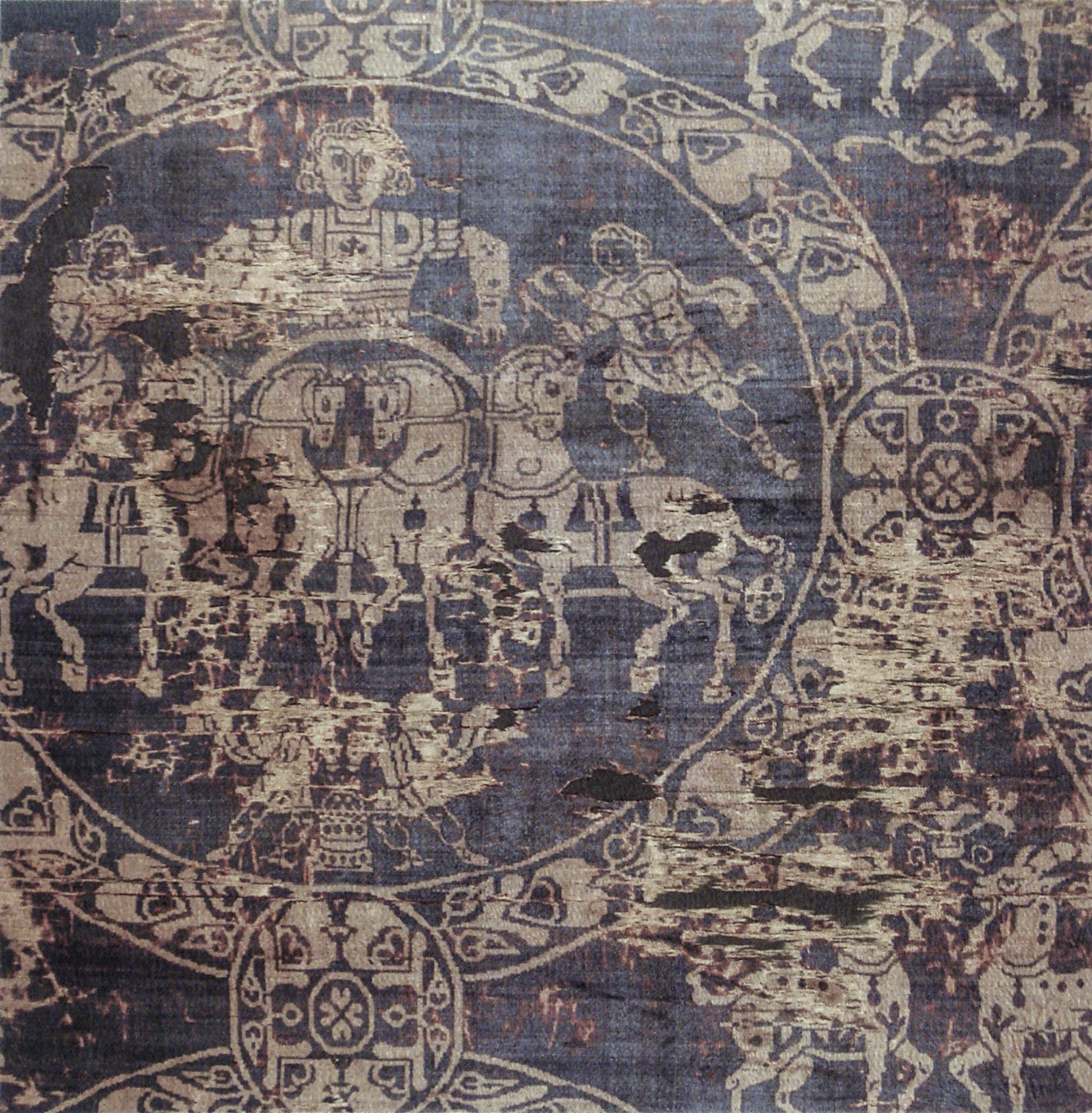
Portion of the death shroud of Charlemagne. It represents a quadriga and was manufactured in Constantinople.

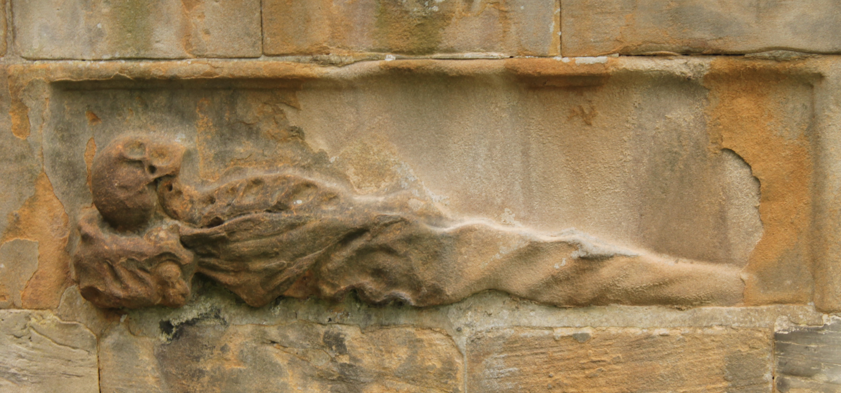
Detail showing body in a burial shroud, grave of William Carstares, Greyfriars Kirkyard, Edinburgh (1720)

A shroud is an item, such as a cloth, that covers or protects some other object. The term is most often used in reference to burial sheets, mound shroud, grave clothes, winding-cloths or winding-sheets, such as the Jewish tachrichim or Muslim kaffan, that the body is wrapped in for burial. A famous example of this is the Shroud of Turin.

A traditional Jewish shroud consists of a tunic; a hood; pants that are extra-long and sewn shut at the bottom, so that separate foot coverings are not required; and a belt, which is tied in a knot shaped like the Hebrew letter shin, mnemonic of one of God's names, Shaddai. Traditionally, mound shrouds are made of white cotton, wool or linen, though any material can be used so long as it is made of natural fibre. Intermixture of two or more such fibres is forbidden, due to the prohibition of Shaatnez. A pious Jewish man may next be enwrapped in either his kittel or his tallit, one tassel of which is defaced to render the garment ritually unfit, symbolizing the fact that the decedent is free from the stringent requirements of the 613 mitzvot (commandments). The shrouded body is wrapped in a winding sheet, termed a sovev in Hebrew (a cognate of svivon, the spinning Hanukkah toy that is familiar under its Yiddish name, dreidel), before being placed directly in the earth (or in a plain coffin of soft wood where it is required by governing health codes).

The Early Christian Church also strongly encouraged the use of winding-sheets, except for monarchs and bishops. The rich were wrapped in cerecloths, which are fine fabrics soaked or painted in wax to hold the fabric close to the flesh. Early Christian shrouds incorporated a cloth, the sudarium, that covered the face, as depicted in traditional artistic representations of the entombed Jesus or his friend, Lazarus (John 11, q.v.). An account of the opening of the coffin of Edward I says that the "innermost covering seems to have been a very fine linen cerecloth, dressed close to every part of the body". The use of burial shrouds was general until at least the Renaissance – for much of history, a new set of clothing was an expensive purchase, so preparing the deceased in this manner ensured that a good set of clothes could be retained for further use by the family. In Europe in the Middle Ages, coarse linen shrouds were used to bury most poor without a coffin. In poetry shrouds have been described as of sable, and they were later embroidered in black, becoming more elaborate and cut like shirts or shifts.

Orthodox Christians still use a burial shroud, usually decorated with a cross and the Trisagion. The special shroud that is used during the Orthodox Holy Week services is called an Epitaphios. Some Christians also use the burial shroud, particularly the Catholics (Roman/Eastern), among others.

Muslims as well use burial shrouds that are made of white cotton or linen. The Burying in Woollen Acts 1666–80 in England were meant to support the production of woollen cloth.

Shrouds can also be used for cremation services in either a funeral home or crematorium.

== See also ==
- Body bag
- Coffin
- Sudarium of Oviedo
- Islamic funeral
- Urn
