= ZAKA =

Voluntary emergency response teams in Israel

- זק"א
- Formation: 1989; 37 years ago
- Founder: Yehuda Meshi Zahav
- Services: First aid, search and rescue, Jewish burial
- CEO: Dubi Weissenstern
- Volunteers: >3,000 (2023)
- Website: zaka.org.il

ZAKA (Hebrew: זק"א, abbreviation for Zihuy Korbanot Ason, זיהוי קרבנות אסון, lit. 'Disaster Victim Identification') is the name of a series of voluntary post-disaster response teams in Israel, each operating in a police district (two in the Central District due to geographic considerations). They are recognized by the Israeli government. The full name is "ZAKA – Identification, Extraction and Rescue – True Kindness" (זק"א - איתור חילוץ והצלה - חסד של אמת). The two largest ZAKA factions are Zaka Tel Aviv and ZAKA Search and Rescue.

ZAKA faced insolvency before 7 October 2023. Given the job of retrieving the dead bodies after the October 7 attacks, they started fund-raising on 8 October 2023. By 31 January 2024, they had raised over 50 million shekels ($13.7 million). According to Haaretz, ZAKA's conduct in the aftermath of the attacks was unprofessional, including mixing up remains and spreading misinformation about atrocities that never happened in order to raise money.

== Background ==
ZAKA volunteers respond to the scenes of violent attacks and homicides throughout Israel. The volunteers are trained paramedics and are on call 24/7. ZAKA collects the remains of the dead, including their blood, so that they may be buried in accordance with Jewish religious law. Volunteers are allowed to work on Shabbat, because the sabbath can be broken in matters of life and death.

Members of ZAKA, most of whom are ultra-Orthodox Jews, assist ambulance crews, aid in the identification of the victims of violence, road accidents and other disasters, and where necessary gather body parts and spilled blood for proper Jewish burial. They also provide first aid and rescue services, and help with the search for missing persons and participate in international rescue and recovery operations.

After acts of violence, ZAKA volunteers also collect the bodies and body parts of non-Jews, including suicide bombers, for return to their families. The phrase "Chesed shel Emet" refers to doing "kindness" for the benefit of the deceased, which is considered to be "true kindness", because the (deceased) beneficiaries of the kindness cannot return the kindness.

== History ==
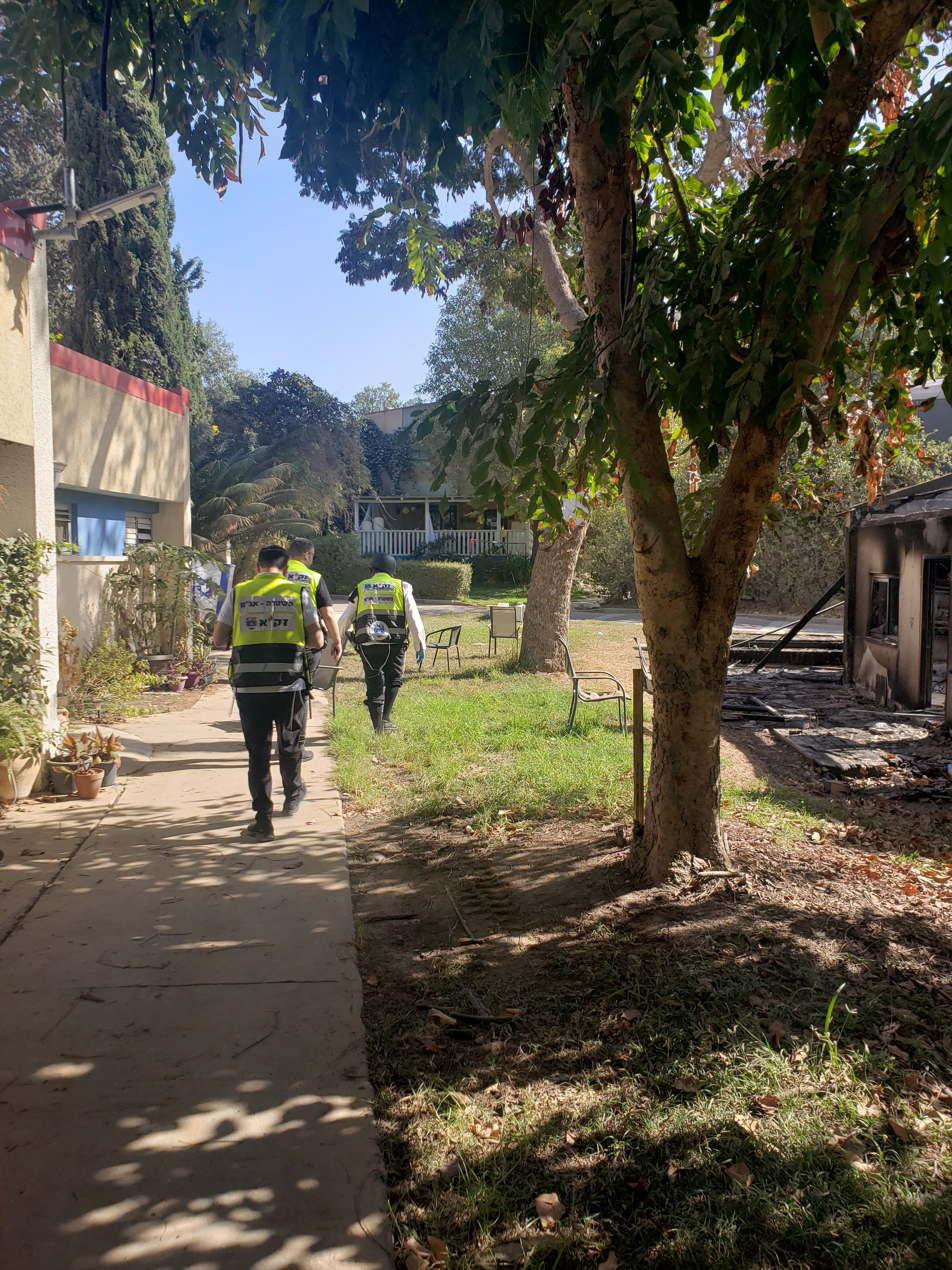
ZAKA volunteers working in destroyed Be'eri after the massacre in 2023

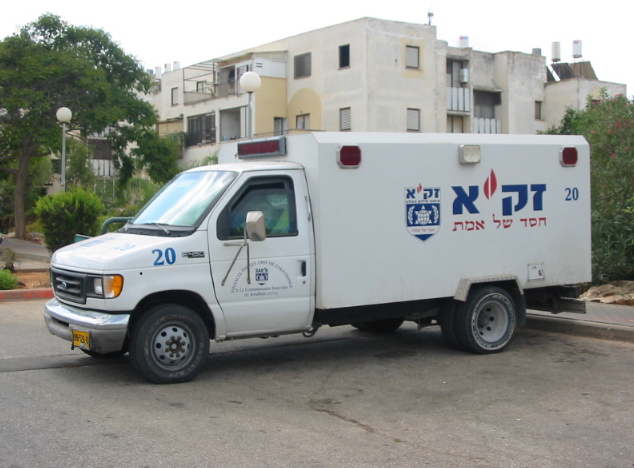
Zaka armoured ambulance for use in the West Bank

The organization traces its roots to a group of religious volunteers who assisted in the recovery of human remains after the Tel Aviv Jerusalem bus 405 attack in Israel in 1989, during the First Intifada. ZAKA was formally established in 1995.

During the attack on bus line 405 in 1990, Yehuda Meshi Zahav arrived with other yeshiva boys to provide first aid to the victims. On his way home, he concluded that if in the enemy's view everyone is equal, so too for him. In the 1990s, he arrived at the scenes of suicide bombing attacks in Israel, among other things, and treated the bodies of those killed. As a result, ZAKA (Disaster Victim Identification) was founded. In his capacity as Chairman of ZAKA, he worked for inter-religious and secular reconciliation.

In 2005, ZAKA established a minorities unit with Bedouin, Muslim, and Druze volunteers to serve Israel's non-Jewish communities, primarily Bedouin in the Negev and Druze in the Galilee. These units also function when religious Jews cannot, on the Jewish Sabbath and holidays. According to Jewish law, Jews may violate the Sabbath to save a life, but not to deal with the dead. In 2010, ZAKA said it planned to increase its minorities units to 125 volunteers.

In 2004, a group of ZAKA volunteers flew to The Hague, with the wreckage of the bus destroyed in the Jerusalem bus 19 suicide bombing on 29 January 2004. The wreckage, along with pictures of victims, was taken to Washington, D.C. to urge the United States Government to act against the Palestinian resistance movement. The bus was later displayed at various US universities.

In August 2007, ZAKA members were accused of burning down a secret crematorium in Israel. Most Jews believe Jews should be buried according to religious tradition, not cremated. ZAKA's founder Yehuda Meshi Zahav denied any involvement of ZAKA in the arson but called the existence of the crematorium a "desecration of the dead" and said that the crematorium was "destined to disappear in flames."

In January 2016, after two failed attempts, the United Nations granted ZAKA the status of a 'consultant NGO'.

ZAKA faced insolvency before 7 October 2023. Given the job of retrieving the dead bodies after the October 7 attacks, they started fund-raising on 8 October 2023. By 31 January 2024, they had raised over 50 million shekels ($13.7 million). A Haaretz investigation accused them of "negligence, misinformation and a fundraising campaign that used the dead as props".

== Organization ==
Its volunteers are almost all ultra-Orthodox Jews. However as of 2010, more than 125 Muslim, Druze, and Bedouin volunteers provided services to non-Jewish victims.

In 2010, ZAKA volunteers numbered 1,500.

The organization says it employs around 4,000 volunteers, though a 2022 investigation by Haaretz, based on "documents and testimonies by senior figures in the organization", said there were fewer than 1,000 volunteers, alleged that the numbers were inflated to increase funding, and found volunteers who said they had not received the biannual training mandated by the Interior Ministry. ZAKA denied the report. In 2017, its annual operating budget was about one million shekels. The New York Times reported a membership of "more than 3,000 volunteers, most of them ultra-Orthodox Jewish men" in 2024.

== International rescue and recovery operations ==
- In late 2004 and early 2005, members of ZAKA provided assistance in Thailand, Sri Lanka, India and Indonesia in the aftermath of the 2004 Indian Ocean earthquake. Forensic teams reportedly dubbed the group "the team that sleeps with the dead" because they toiled nearly 24 hours a day at Buddhist pagodas in Thailand that had been transformed into morgues to identify those who died in the tsunami. The experience of ZAKA members, who reportedly see 38 bodies a week on average in Israel, helped the Israeli forensic team to identify corpses faster than many of the other forensic teams that operated in Thailand in the aftermath of the disaster, which placed them in high demand with grieving families.
- In February 2007, ZAKA sent a 10-person search and rescue team, consisting primarily of rescue divers, to Paris to search for a missing Israeli defense official. The mission was funded by the Defense Ministry at an expected cost of $80,000.
- In November 2008, ZAKA volunteers went to Mumbai, India following terrorist attacks that included a Jewish center among its targets.
- Following the 2010 Haiti earthquake, a six-man ZAKA International Search and Rescue Unit delegation arrived in Haiti to assist with search and recovery efforts. Working with the Mexican military delegation and Jewish volunteers from Mexico, eight students trapped under the rubble of the collapsed eight-storey Port-au-Prince University building were rescued on the first day after their arrival.
- Teams of ZAKA volunteers were sent to Japan in March 2011 to assist in search-and-rescue after the devastating earthquake and subsequent tsunami.
- A ZAKA team was part of an Israeli mission to Nepal in late April 2015 to help search for casualties in the aftermath of the earthquake and subsequent avalanches.
- In January 2019, a ZAKA team deployed in Brazil to conduct search and rescue operations following a dam collapse in Brumadinho.

== Casualties and injuries ==
Several ZAKA volunteers died as a result of the October 7 attacks. Danny Vovk, a driver, was killed during the Netiv HaAsara massacre.

Widespread psychological trauma was reported among ZAKA volunteers as a result of the scenes that they worked to clean.

== Controversies ==
=== Yehuda Meshi-Zahav ===
After Yehuda Meshi-Zahav, ZAKA's co-founder and main figurehead for more than 30 years, was awarded the Israel Prize in March 2021, multiple accusations surfaced of his having committed sexual assaults against women, girls and boys over several decades, with the knowledge of others in the community. Channel 13 reported that ZAKA officials had known about the abuse allegations and worked to silence the claims. Meshi-Zahav subsequently resigned ZAKA leadership and relinquished the Israel Prize.

In response to the accusations, a senior ZAKA official said the organization had now "washed its hands" of Meshi-Zahav and that "given the accusations against him, it's very hard to remember the good that he's done. We always saw him with women and suspected that he was a deviant, but we never suspected he was a pedophile or a rapist. In retrospect, this [the allegations] explains a lot of things we saw over the years. Following a suicide attempt in April 2021, Meshi-Zahav entered a coma and died in June 2022.

Gideon Aran, a Professor of Sociology and Anthropology at Hebrew University, said in his book about ZAKA that most ZAKA volunteers, while familiar with Meshi-Zahav and the colorful image of himself that he had cultivated, probably had no inkling of his misconduct; only a very few senior members were partially aware of his inclinations, without suspecting there was criminal and pathological behavior involved. Following the scandal, Aran found that aside from a few changes in personnel, the organization's principles, sentiments and activities remained the same, and the damage to its public reputation was minimal.

=== October 7 attacks ===
In the aftermath of the October 7 attacks, ZAKA volunteers gave several incorrect reports of atrocities allegedly committed by Hamas, including the binding and burning of babies, that were widely circulated in the media. Some of ZAKA's accounts of Sexual and gender-based violence in the 2023 Hamas-led attack on Israel have also been debunked. For example, one volunteer discovered a girl's body with her pants pulled down and concluded that she had been sexually assaulted. Later, it was discovered that Israeli soldiers had in fact dragged the body across the floor, causing the pants to fall.

A ZAKA leader acknowledged mistakes were made: "When we find bodies that are burned or in a state of decomposition, we can easily be mistaken and think the body is a child's ... Our volunteers were confronted with traumatic scenes and sometimes misinterpreted what they saw." ZAKA also stated that they are not forensics specialists. However, the debunked accounts have fed skepticism about Israel's description of the events of the Hamas attacks.

A subsequent Haaretz report stated that in order to get media exposure, ZAKA spread accounts of atrocities that never happened and released sensitive and graphic photos in an effort to shock people into donating. The Haaretz investigation accused ZAKA of "negligence, misinformation and a fundraising campaign that used the dead as props". Haaretz also said that while hundreds of ZAKA volunteers did important work under challenging conditions, the organization acted unprofessionally on the ground, often mixing up the remains of multiple victims in the same bag and creating little or no documentation.

== Key people ==
- Yossi Landau, Head of Operations, Southern Region
- Rabbi Yechezkel (Hezki) Farkash, Head of Operations, Northern Region

== See also ==
- Chesed Shel Emes
- Chevra kadisha
- Hatzalah
- Magen David Adom
- Misaskim
- Shura Base
