= Davy Crockett (play) =

Davy Crockett, or Be Sure You're Right, Then Go Ahead
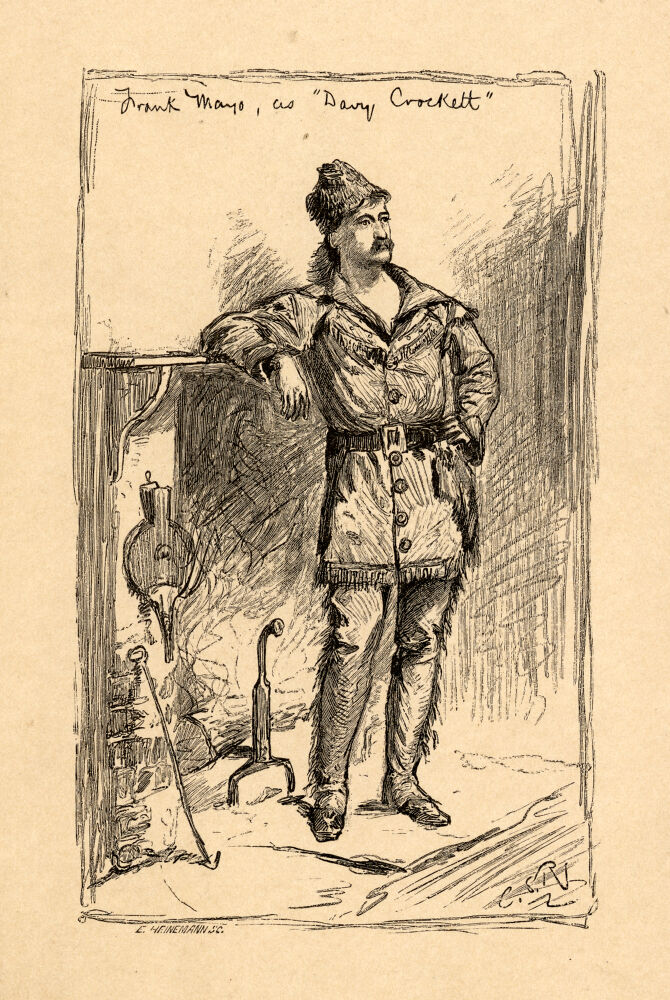
- Frank Mayo as Davy Crockett
- Written by: Frank Murdoch
- Genre: melodrama, frontier drama
- Setting: American frontier

Premiere
- Date premiered: 1872 / Broadway June 1873

Davy Crockett, or Be Sure You're Right, Then Go Ahead is an 1872 American play which became very popular in its time, inspired by the frontiersman of the same name.

It was written by Frank Murdoch, and the lead role was played by Frank Mayo.

== Plot ==
Crockett arrives at his home in the woods and learns that "Little Nell" (properly named Eleanor Vaughn), his childhood love interest, has returned from abroad, along with her guardian and fiancé. As that group travels to their intended destination at the fiancé's uncle's estate, Crockett offers shelter in his hunting hut. The play's most memorable scene has Crockett use his arm to bar the hut's door against howling wolves. The uncle is later revealed to be evil and forcing the marriage, so Crockett is able to marry Eleanor.

Though often cited as a prominent example of a frontier drama, the play is more of a standard melodrama set in a frontier location.

== Reception ==
The play has been called "one of the most revered plays of the nineteenth-century American theatre." However, its initial critical reviews were negative, though it came to achieve great success. Mayo played Crockett throughout much of the rest of his life, already reaching his 1000th performance of the role by May 1877. Though it proved impossible, Mayo did try to break free of being typecast as Crockett. He once lamented that a man had approached him and asked "I don't suppose you'll ever play anything else but Mayo, Mr. Crockett?" Even Mayo's son had success playing the role.

The play's popularity was as a touring production, but it first played on Broadway in June 1873 at Wood's Museum Theatre for 12 performances. It also played at Niblo's Garden in March 1874.

The 1916 silent film of the same name credits Murdoch as the writer.
