= Chevra kadisha =

Jewish burial association

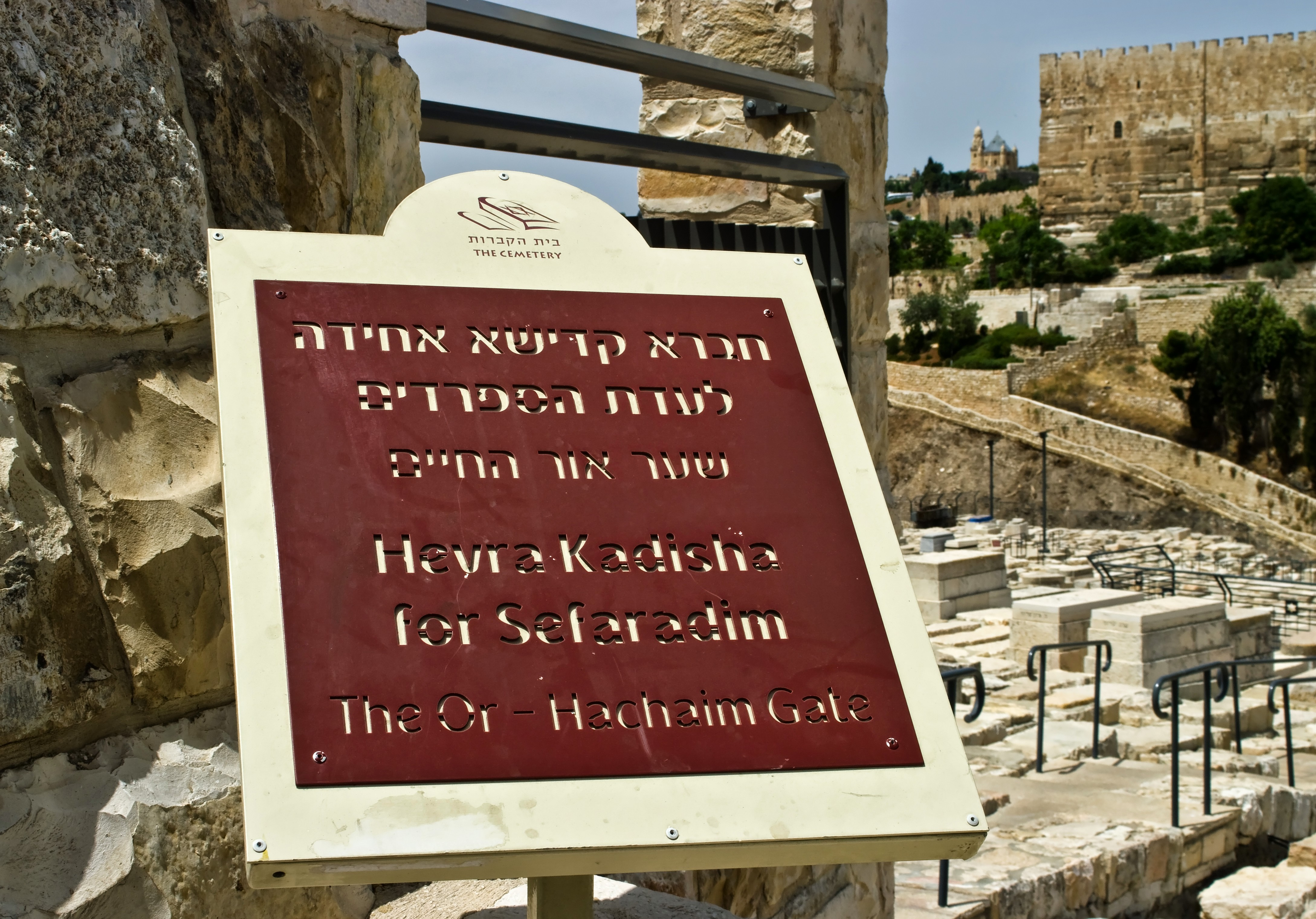
Hevra Kadisha for Sefaradim, the Or-Hachaim Gate

The term chevra kadisha (Hebrew: חֶבְרָה קַדִּישָׁא, romanized: ḥeb̲rā qaddišā) gained its modern sense of "burial society" in the nineteenth century. It is an organization of Jewish men and women who see to it that the bodies of deceased Jews are prepared for burial according to Jewish tradition and are protected from desecration, willful or not, until burial. Two of the main requirements are the showing of proper respect for a corpse, and the ritual cleansing of the body and subsequent dressing for burial. It is usually referred to as a burial society in English.

== Etymology ==
In Rabbinic and Modern Hebrew, "sacred society" would be written חבורה קדושה (ḥavurā qəḏošā), while in Aramaic, it would be חבורתא קדישתא (ḥavurtā qaddištā). Chevra qadisha has an unclear etymology. The Aramaic phrase is first attested in the Yekum Purkan in a 13th-century copy of the Machzor Vitry, but it was rarely used again in print until it gained its modern sense of "burial society" in the nineteenth century. The Hebrew phrase predated its modern popularity for decades. The current phrase is probably a phonetic transliteration of the Ashkenazic pronunciation of the Hebrew version, which has been misinterpreted as an Aramaic phrase and, therefore, spelled with a yodh and aleph.

== History ==
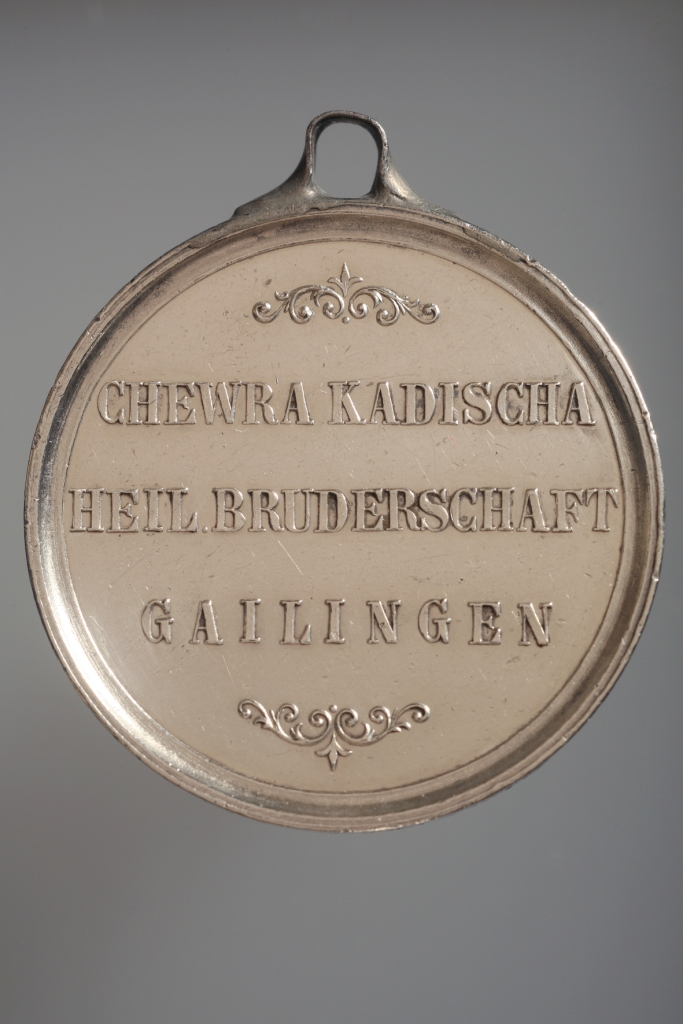
Chevra kadisha medal from 1876, on the occasion of the 200-year jubilee of the chevra kadisha of Gailingen. In the collection of the Jewish Museum of Switzerland.

Eliezer Ashkenazi formed the first modern Jewish burial society in 1564, in imitation of Christian guilds, and its regulations were codified by Judah Loew.

The chevra kadisha became more fully developed in 17th century Italy, where the Italian kabbalist Aaron Berechiah ben Moses published the important chevra guide Maavor Yabbok ["Crossing the Jabbok"] in 1626, which describes both how to care for the sick and dying and how to conduct death rituals. Likewise, Simon Frankfurter's Sefer Hahayiim, published in Amsterdam in 1702 and 1716, remains an important text defining the work of the chevra kadisha. A set of paintings produced by or for the Prague chevra kadisha around 1780 shows each step of the process and other aspects of the group’s work, like visiting the sick.

While burial societies were, in Europe, generally a community function, in the United States, it has become far more common for societies to be organized by neighborhood synagogues. In the late 19th and early 20th century, burial societies were formed as landsmanshaftn (mutual aid societies) in the United States. Some landsmanshaftn were burial societies, while others were independent of the traditional burial society. There were 20,000 such landsmanshaftn in the U.S. at one time.

Today, there is revived interest in the work of chevra kadishas in non-Orthodox Jewish communities.

=== Recordkeeping ===
The burial societies of communities in pre-World War II Europe maintained Pinkas Klali D’Chevra Kadisha (translation: general notebook of the Chevra Kadisha); some were handwritten in Yiddish, others in Hebrew.

== Chevra kadisha functions ==
Chevra kadishas are involved in multiple aspects of caring for the living and the dying. A chevra kadisha's members may engage in bikur cholim. After a death, the society may also provide shomrim to guard against body snatching, vermin, or desecration until burial. In some communities, this is done by people close to the departed or by paid shomrim hired by the funeral home. At one time, the danger of the body being stolen was very real; in modern times, the watch has become a way of honoring the deceased. The chevra kadisha also handles the ritual preparation of the body for burial. In addition, most burial societies also support families during the shiva (traditional week of mourning) by arranging prayer services, meals and other facilities.

A specific task of the burial society is also tending to the dead with no next of kin. These are termed a met mitzvah (מת מצוה "mitzvah corpse"), as tending to a met mitzvah overrides virtually any other positive commandment (mitzvat aseh), an indication of the high premium the Torah places on the honor of the dead.

== Ritual purification process ==
The society ensures dignified treatment of the deceased following Jewish law, custom, and tradition. Unusually, as there is little halacha defining the process, minhag defines a great deal of the work, and communities develop some of their own practices.

Men typically prepare the bodies of men; women prepare those of women. However, some non-Orthodox chevra kadishas allow mixed-gender teams. Some chevra kadishas have developed policies for preparing the bodies of gender non-conforming people that may also deviate from traditional gendered practice.

Taharah actually describes one part of a three-stage process, but it is broadly used as a metonym for all of the related tasks. The ritual is typically conducted in near silence, except for the recitation of prescribed prayers.

The body is first thoroughly cleansed of dirt, bodily fluids and solids, and anything else that may be on the skin, a process called rechitzah. The washed body is then ritually purified by immersion in a mikvah or a continuous flow of water poured from buckets, from the head over the entire body, a process called taharah. However, if the body of the deceased is covered with blood from bleeding related to the cause of death or that was drawn after death, the body is typically not washed, in alignment with beliefs about the need to bury all parts of the body. Additionally, anything removed from the body during cleaning—hair, skin, trimmed nails—is saved and buried with the deceased.

Once the body is purified, the body is dressed in the halbashah process. The deceased is dressed in tachrichim, or shrouds, of white pure muslin or linen garments made up of ten pieces for a man and twelve for a woman, which are identical for each Jew and which symbolically recall the garments worn by the High Priest of Israel. If the deceased wore a tallit, it is placed on the body and one fringe is cut.

Once the body is shrouded, it is placed in the casket, a process called halnahah. Shards of unglazed pottery may be placed over the eyes and mouth and soil, often from Israel, sprinkled on the body. The casket is then closed. The group then apologizes to the deceased for any errors or inadvertently disrespectful actions.

For burial in the Holy Land (including modern Israel), a casket is not used in most cemeteries. If, however, the body is to be shipped internationally for burial in Israel, an airline-approved casket is required, as is, in many cases, embalming.

== Other activities ==
Many burial societies hold one or two annual fast days and organize regular study sessions to remain up-to-date with the relevant articles of Jewish law. Such events are often held on the seventh of Adar, the date of the death of Moses. Because God buried Moses, tradition says, the date is a “day off” for the chevra kadisha.

== See also ==
- Asra Kadisha
- Chesed Shel Emes
- Chevra Kaddisha Cemetery, Sacramento
- Hebrew Free Burial Association
- Landsmanshaft
- Misaskim
- ZAKA
