= Knesiyat Hasekhel =

Knesiyat Hasekhel כנסיית השכל
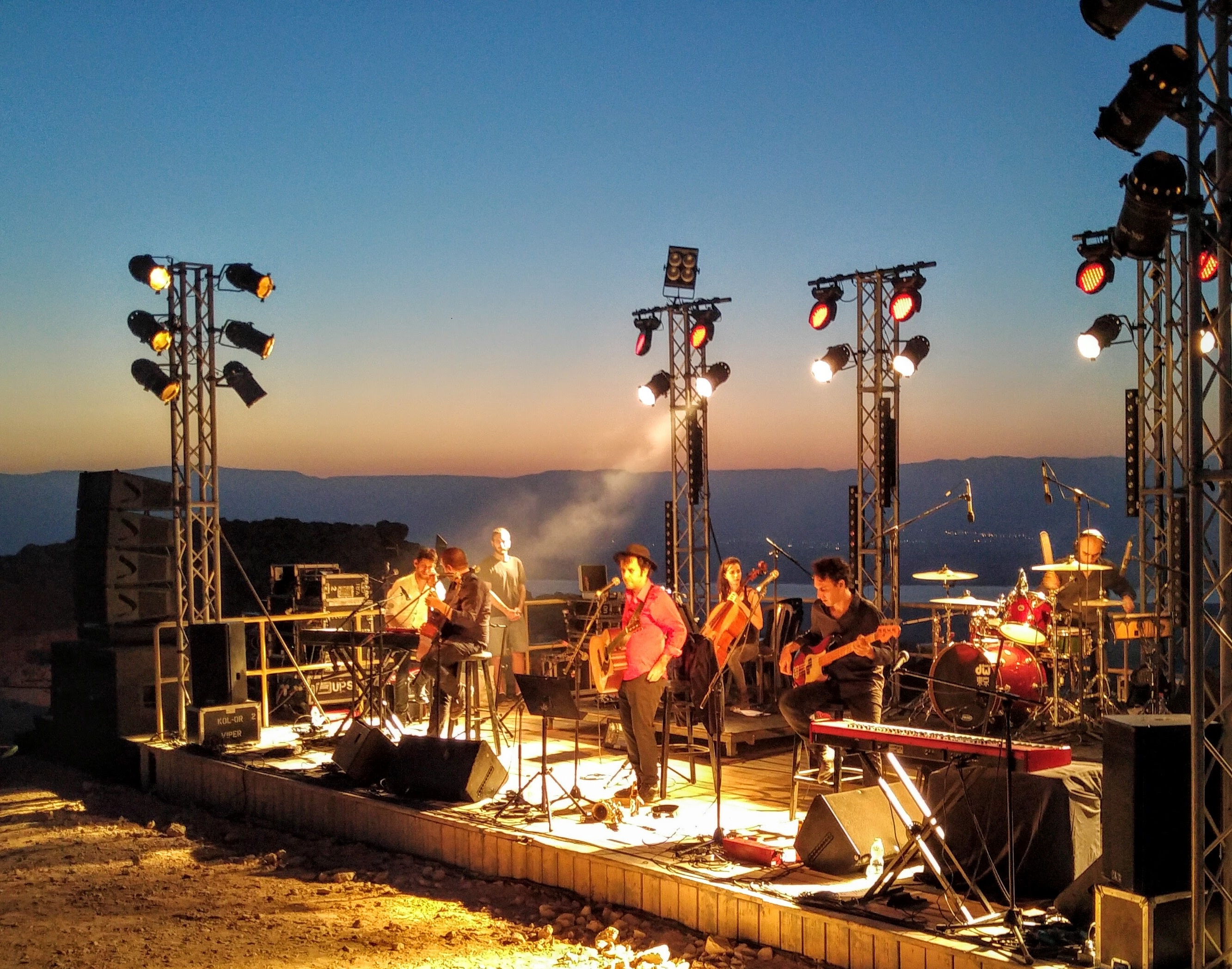

Background information
- Origin: Sderot, Israel
- Genres: Rock, mizrahi, new wave
- Years active: 1990s–present
- Members: Yoram Hazan; Ran Elmaliach; David Rasad; Daniel Ziblat; Ami Reiss
- Past members: Yuval Shafrir, Motti Yosef, Mike Golan

Knesiyat Hasekhel (Hebrew: כנסיית השכל; "The Mind Church") is an Israeli rock band from Sderot.

== History ==
The name of the band, established in the early 1990s, is a translation into Hebrew of Church of Reason, from Robert Pirsig's book Zen and the Art of Motorcycle Maintenance.

The music is a blend of new wave music and post-punk influences (particularly Nick Cave and the Bad Seeds) and Mediterranean and Middle Eastern ethnic rock. In 1993, Knesiyat Hasekhel produced its first studio album, "Whispered Words" (nanadisk). In 1994, Knesiyat Hasekhel released their second studio album "Here are Songs".

The third full length and self-titled album "Knesiyat Hasekhel" was released in 1999. The band was named "best rock group of 1999" by Israel's national radio station, and invited to play at major rock festivals around the country.

In 2001, Mashina's Shlomi Bracha helped produce the band's third album "Rutz Yeled" (Run, Kid!), a studio album that was recorded live. Following the release of the album, the band toured with Ehud Banai.

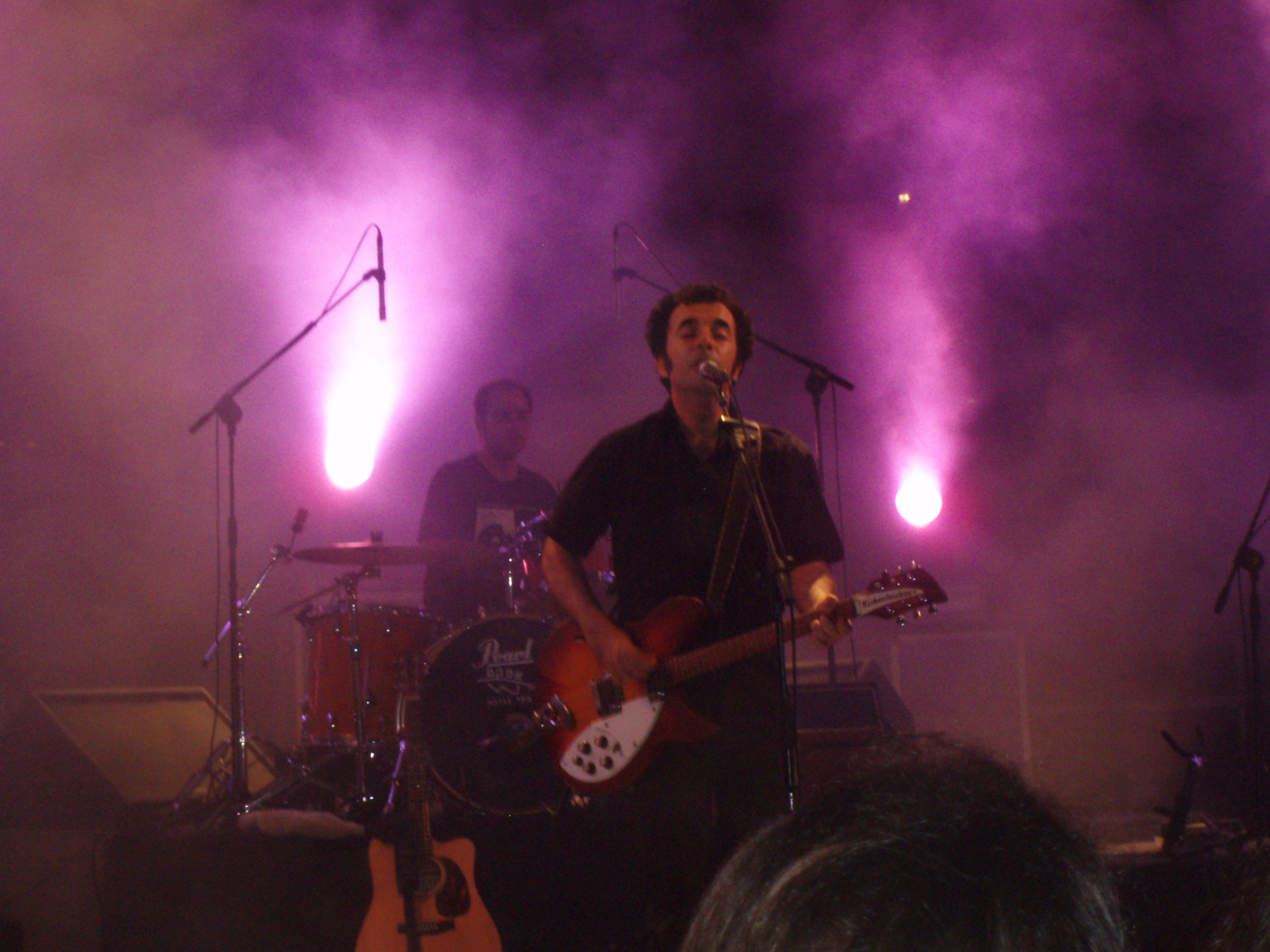
Yoram Hazan, lead singer

Their fourth album "Yadaiim Lemalah" (Hands Up) was released in 2004, and was produced for the first time by the band themselves.

In 2007 the band teamed up with a new label to produce "Autobiography," re-recording their hits accompanied by a 40-piece orchestra composed of ethnic and traditional classical instruments. A live show was produced for the Israel Festival.

== Discography ==
- Whispered Words (Nanadisk) – 1993
- Here are Songs (Hed Artzi) – 1994
- Church of Reason (Levantini) – 1999
- Run Child (NMC Records) – 2001
- Hands Up (NMC Records) – 2004
- Autobiography (Barbi Records) – 2007
- Rows of People - 2010
- Home Is So Far - 2013
- It Is Not Me - 2017

== See also ==
- Israeli music
