= Burial society =

Association for communal benefit

A burial society is a type of benefit/friendly society. These groups historically existed in England and elsewhere, and were constituted for the purpose of providing by voluntary subscriptions for the funeral expenses of the husband, wife or child of a member, or of the widow of a deceased member. Some also allowed for insuring money to be paid on the death of a member.

Not-for-profit burial societies still exist today. For-profit companies also provide funeral insurance.

Jewish communities often include a burial society known as the chevra kadisha, which also covers performing the necessary Jewish funerary rituals and ceremonies. Jewish mutual aid associations also often served as burial societies to the extent of providing burial plots in Jewish cemeteries and covering expenses.

== In antiquity ==
Burial societies were precursors to general insurance. Burial societies were first known to exist in ancient Rome, wherein various collegia - associations of a fraternal nature, as well as religious groups, political clubs, and trade guilds - functioned as burial societies. Terms for these include hetaeria, collegia, and sodalitas.

One of the ways that the Romans made sense of the earliest Christian groups was to think of them as associations of this kind, particularly burial societies, which were permitted even when political conflict or civil unrest caused authorities to ban meetings of other groups; Pliny the Younger identified Christians collectively as a hetaeria.

== 19th century ==
Edmund Roberts mentioned the European and Burial Society when he visited Cape Town, South Africa in 1833. The society was founded in 1795 by Dutch settlers. He described it as "supporting poor and unfortunate fellow-countrymen, during their illness, and in the event of their death, to cause them to be respectfully interred". He also mentioned that the society had "considerable funds", during his visit to the area.
