= List of burials at West Laurel Hill Cemetery =

West Laurel Hill Cemetery is a rural cemetery established in 1869 in Bala Cynwyd, Pennsylvania. The cemetery was added to the National Register of Historic Places in 1992 and contains the burials of many notable persons.

== A ==
- Timothee Adamowski (1857–1943), composer, conductor, music teacher, and violinist
- Green Adams (1812–1884), U.S. Congressman
- Randolph Greenfield Adams (1892–1951), librarian and historian
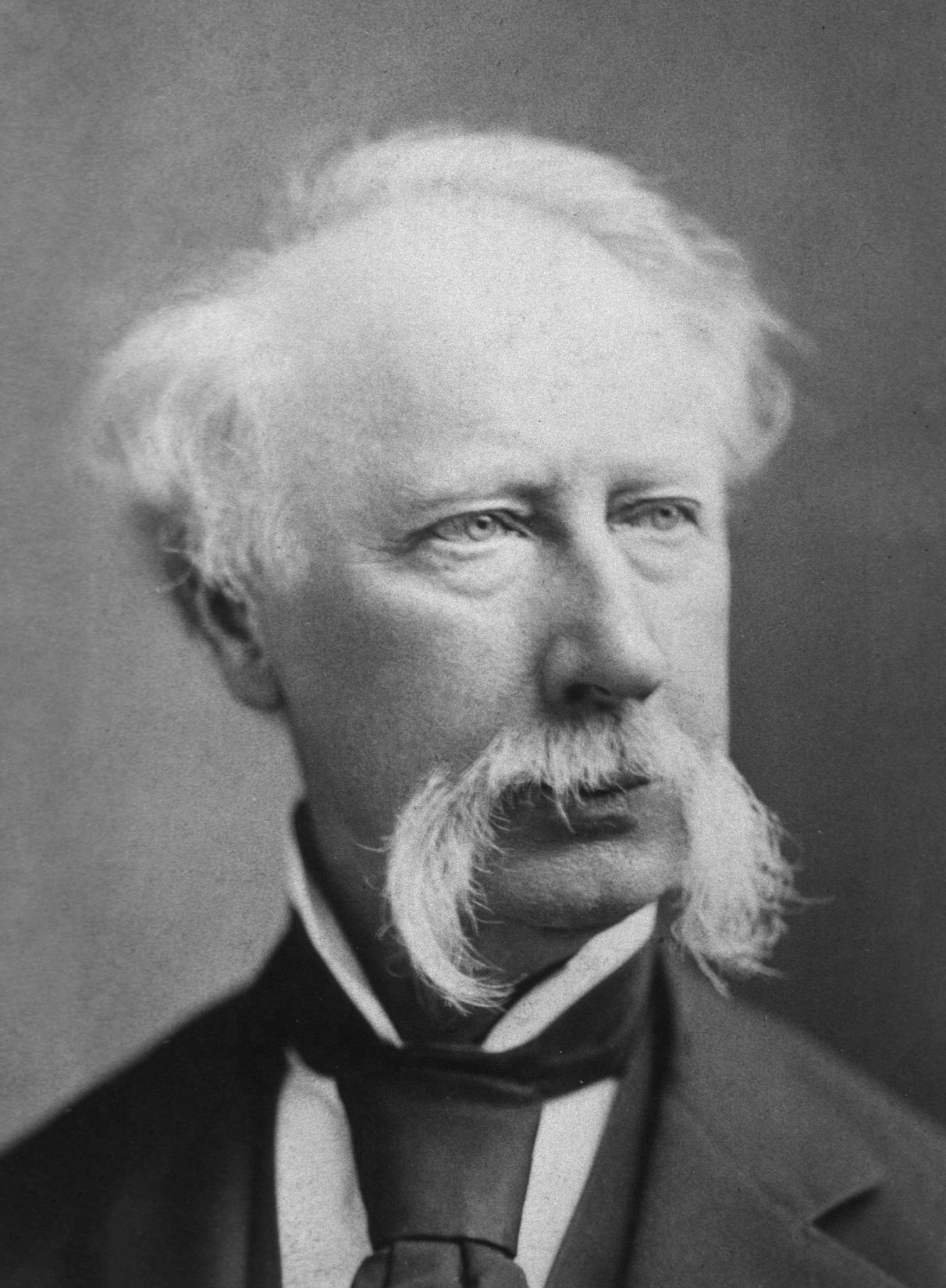
- David Hayes Agnew was a surgeon and the subject of Thomas Eakins' painting The Agnew Clinic
  David Hayes Agnew (1818–1892), surgeon, anatomist, and educator
- Raymond Pace Alexander (1897–1974), American civil rights leader, lawyer, politician, and first African American judge appointed to the Pennsylvania Court of Common Pleas
- Sadie Tanner Mossell Alexander (1898–1989), first African-American woman to receive a Ph.D. in the United States.
- Harrison Allen (1841–1897), surgeon, anatomist, zoologist, and educator
- Sarah A. Anderson (1901–1992), first Black woman to preside over Pennsylvania House of Representatives general assembly
- Robert Arthur Jr. (1909–1969), writer of speculative fiction, winner of three Edgar Awards
- Samuel Howell Ashbridge (1848–1906), 78th mayor of Philadelphia

== B ==
- Hobey Baker (1892–1918), amateur athlete, namesake of Hobey Baker Award and Hobey Baker Memorial Rink at Princeton University
- Layyah Barakat (1858-1940), Christian missionary, writer, temperance activist, and prison reformer
- Russell Ball (1891–1942), Hollywood film still and portrait photographer
- Samuel L. M. Barlow II (1892–1982), composer, pianist and art critic
- Joseph Beam (1954–1988), African American gay rights activist, writer and poet
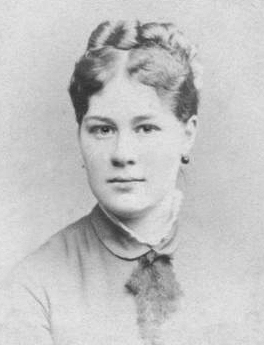
- Cecilia Beaux was the first woman instructor at the Pennsylvania Academy of the Fine Arts
  Cecilia Beaux (1855–1942), painter
- Joe Berry (1894–1976), professional baseball player
- Edward Julius Berwind (1848–1936), founder of Berwind-White Coal Mining Company, owner of The Elms in Newport, Rhode Island, Edward J. Berwind House in New York City
- Julia Berwind, (1865–1961), socialite, social welfare activist, owner of The Elms in Newport, Rhode Island
- Frank Bettger (1888–1981), self-help book author
- Charles M. Betts (1838–1905), Medal of Honor recipient
- Richard Binder (1839–1912), Medal of Honor recipient
- Oliver Bosbyshell (1839–1921), Civil War veteran, superintendent United States Mint (1889-1894)
- Catherine Drinker Bowen (1897–1973), writer best known for biographies, winner 1958 National Book Award for Nonfiction
- Caroline G. Boughton (1854–1905), educator and social activist
- Benjamin Markley Boyer (1823–1887), U.S. Congressman and president judge for Montgomery County Court
- Anna Robeson Brown (1873–1941), writer
- Edward G. Budd (1870–1946), founder of the Budd Company
- William M. Bunn (1842–1923), American newspaperman, Governor of Idaho Territory from 1884 to 1885
- Jervis Burdick, (1889–1962), track and field athlete, competed in 1912 Summer Olympics
- Edward Bushnell (1876–1951), distance runner, competed in 1900 Summer Olympics

== C ==
- Alexander Milne Calder (1846–1923), sculptor
- Alexander Stirling Calder (1870–1945), sculptor
- Alan Calvert (1875–1944), weightlifter, bodybuilder, founder Milo Bar-bell Company
- John Carbutt (1832–1905), photography and radiology pioneer
- Arthur Beecher Carles (1882–1952), Modernist painter
- William E. Carter (1875–1940), American millionaire, polo player, and survivor of the RMS Titanic
- Emma C. Chappell (1941–2021), founder of United Bank of Philadelphia
- Clarence Clark (1859–1937), financier, American tennis promoter and player, member of Tennis Hall of Fame
- Constance Clayton (1933–2023), educator, civic leader, Superintendent of the School District of Philadelphia from 1982 to 1993
- William Clothier (1881–1962), Men's Singles Winner, 1906 U.S. National Championships (tennis), member of Tennis Hall of Fame
- Mary-Russell Ferrell Colton (1889–1971), artist, co-founder Museum of Northern Arizona; member Philadelphia Ten
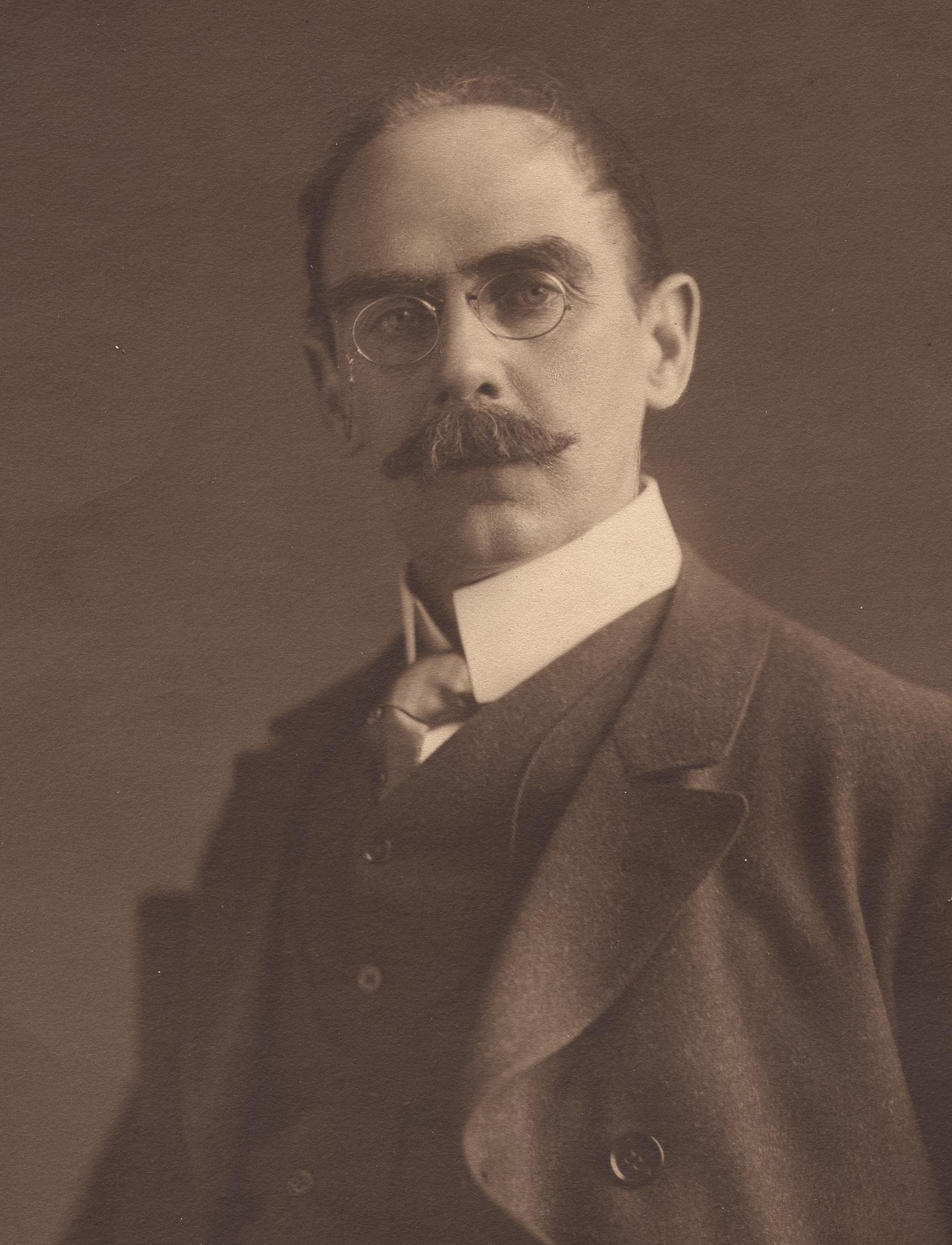
- Colin Campbell Cooper was known for his architectural paintings of skyscrapers
  Colin Campbell Cooper (1856–1937), Impressionist painter
- Joseph K. Corson (1836–1913), Medal of Honor recipient
- Peter E. Costello (1854–1935), Republican member of the United States House of Representatives for Pennsylvania 1915–1921
- Cyrus Curtis (1850–1933), founder of Curtis Publishing Company, publisher of Ladies' Home Journal and Saturday Evening Post

== D ==
- Frank Miles Day (1861–1918), architect
- John Blair Deaver (1855–1931), surgeon and educator
- Joseph H. Diss Debar (1820–1905), French-born American artist and politician
- Giuseppe Del Puente (1841–1900), Italian opera baritone
- Francis Xavier Dercum (1856–1931), neurologist, consultant for Woodrow Wilson after his stroke
- Harry Diddlebock (1854–1900), sportswriter, manager St. Louis Browns
- John Thompson Dorrance (1873–1930), president of the Campbell's
- Cecil Kent Drinker (1887–1956), physiologist, educator, and occupational hygiene expert
- Henry Sandwith Drinker (1880–1965), lawyer and amateur musicologist
- Henry Sturgis Drinker (1850–1937), mechanical engineer, lawyer, author, and fifth president of Lehigh University
- Katherine Rotan Drinker (1889–1956), physician, educator, and occupational hygiene expert
- Sophie Drinker (1888–1967), author, feminist, and musicologist
- H. Louis Duhring Jr. (1874–1953), architect, rebuilt Powel House in the Society Hill section of Philadelphia
- Clarissa F. Dye (1832–1921), volunteer nurse during the American Civil War, president of National Association of Army Nurses of the Civil War

== E ==
- George W. Edmonds (1864-1939), Republican member of the U.S. House of Representatives from Pennsylvania, 1913–1925, 1933-1935
- Loren Eiseley (1907–1977), anthropologist, poet, philosopher, best-selling author
- George Emerick Essig (1838–1925), painter, watercolorist, and etcher who specialized in marine scenes

== F ==
- Beatrice Fenton (1887–1983), sculptor
- Larry Ferrari (1932–1997), American organist who hosted The Larry Ferrari Show from 1954 to 1997 on WPVI-TV
- Frank H. Fleer (1857–1921), confectioner and businessman
- Marie K. Formad, MD (1860-1944), Russian-born American surgeon, gynecologist, and pathologist
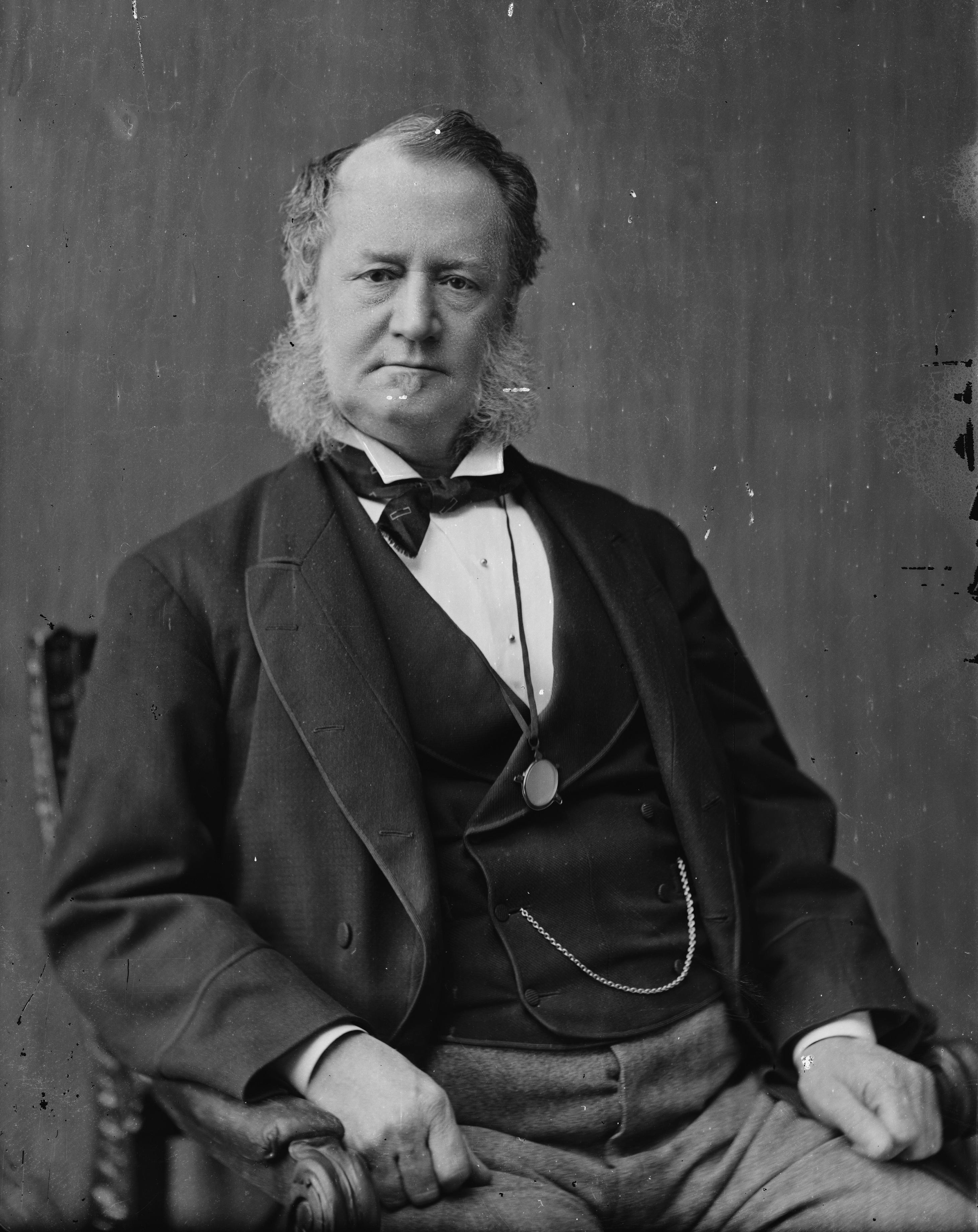
- John Weiss Forney was the first Republican secretary of the U.S. Senate
  John Weiss Forney (1817–1881) politician, journalist, Secretary of the United States Senate 1861–1868
- Tillie May Forney (1862–1922), writer, journalist, and editor
- Robert Foster (1856–1921), professional baseball player
- Daniel M. Fox (1819–1890), mayor of Philadelphia 1869-1871

== G ==
- Dave Garroway (1913–1982) American radio and television host
- Arrah Lee Gaul (1888–1980) artist, member Philadelphia Ten
- Jacob Augustus Geissenhainer (1839–1917), represented New Jersey's 3rd congressional district from 1889 to 1895.
- Clarence H. Geist (1866–1938), public utilities magnate
- Alfred Godwin (1850–1934), English-born stained glass artist
- Nelson Z. Graves (1849–1930), businessman
- Nelson Z. Graves Jr. (1880–1918), cricket player
- John Trout Greble (1834–1861), Union army officer who served in the American Civil War
- Clifford Scott Green (1923-2007), judge of the United States District Court for the Eastern District of Pennsylvania
- John Gribbel (1858–1936), banker and businessman
- Robert Cooper Grier (1794–1870), Associate Justice of The United States Supreme Court

== H ==
- Gladys Hall (1891–1977), film journalist, gossip columnist, wife of glamor photographer Russell Ball
- Alfred C. Harmer (1825–1900), Congressman for Pennsylvania's 5th congressional district from 1871 to 1875 and 1877 to 1900
- Abram W. Harris (1858–1935), 8th president of Northwestern University, first President of the University of Maine
- Marvin Haskin (1930–2009), Professor and Chairman of the Department of Diagnostic Radiology at Hahnemann University
- Herman Haupt (1817–1905), Union army General and engineer
- Lewis M. Haupt (1844–1937), Civil engineer
- James M. Hazlett (1864–1941), Congressman for Pennsylvania's 1st congressional district from March 1927 to October 1927
- Howard Head (1914–1991), businessman who invented the first commercially successful aluminum laminate skis and the oversized tennis racket
- Jocko Henderson (1918–2000), radio disc jockey, businessman, and hip hop music pioneer
- Constantine Hering (1800–1880), pioneer of homeopathy in the United States
- Rudolph Hering (1847–1923), civil engineer
- Catherine Hershey (1871–1915), philanthropist and co-founder of Hershey School, interred for four years in the receiving vault at West Laurel Hill Cemetery
- George Herzog (1851–1920), interior designer and decorative painter
- John Hofford (1863–1915), professional baseball pitcher for Pittsburgh Alleghenys 1885–1886
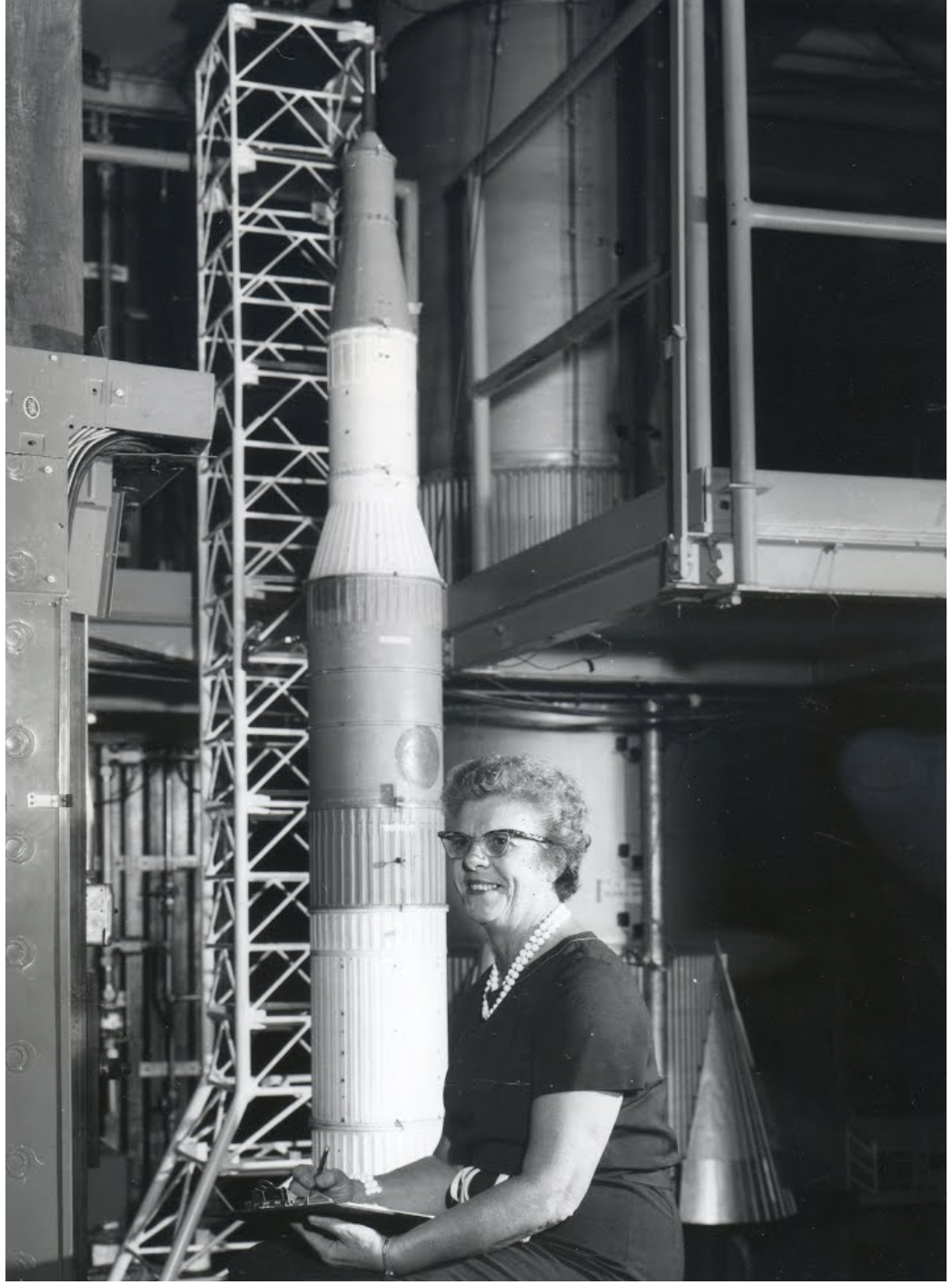
- Vera Huckel worked as a "junior computer" at the National Advisory Committee for Aeronautics, a predecessor of NASA
  Vera Huckel (1908–1999), mathematician and aerospace engineer
- Edie Huggins (1935–2008), television reporter, journalist, and broadcaster
- Hannah Clothier Hull (1872–1958), pacifist and suffragist
- Joseph Miller Huston (1866–1940), architect

== J ==
- Chevalier Jackson (1865–1958), physician, teacher, and pioneer in laryngology
- Roy Jackson (1876–1944), professional football player for Duquesne Country and Athletic Club
- Bushrod Washington James (1806–1903), surgeon, homeopath, educator, writer, and philanthropist
- Anna Jarvis (1864–1948), originator of Mother's Day
- Eldridge R. Johnson (1867–1945), founder of Victor Talking Machine Company
- Emory Richard Johnson (1864–1950), economist, dean of Wharton School of the University of Pennsylvania from 1919 to 1933
- Wallace W. Johnson (1842–1911), Medal of Honor recipient
- Jack Jones (1949–1991), first African-American news anchor in Philadelphia market

== K ==
- John Ernst Worrell Keely (1837–1898), fraudulent inventor who claimed to have discovered a new mode of power
- Roland Grubb Kent (1877–1952), educator and founder of the Linguistic Society of America
- Martha Kimball (1840–1894), Union army nurse who played a role in the founding of Memorial Day
- William J. Kirkpatrick (1838–1921), hymnwriter and music publisher
- Charles Klauder (1872–1938), architect
- Harold Knerr (1882–1949), comic strip creator, writer-artist of The Katzenjammer Kids for 35 years
- Daniel S. Koltun (1933–2014), theoretical physicist who specialized in nuclear physics
- Irena Koprowska (1917–2012), cytopathology pioneer
- Hilary Koprowski (1916–2013), virologist and immunologist
- Robert Lowe Kunzig (1918-1982), judge of the United States Court of Claims

== L ==
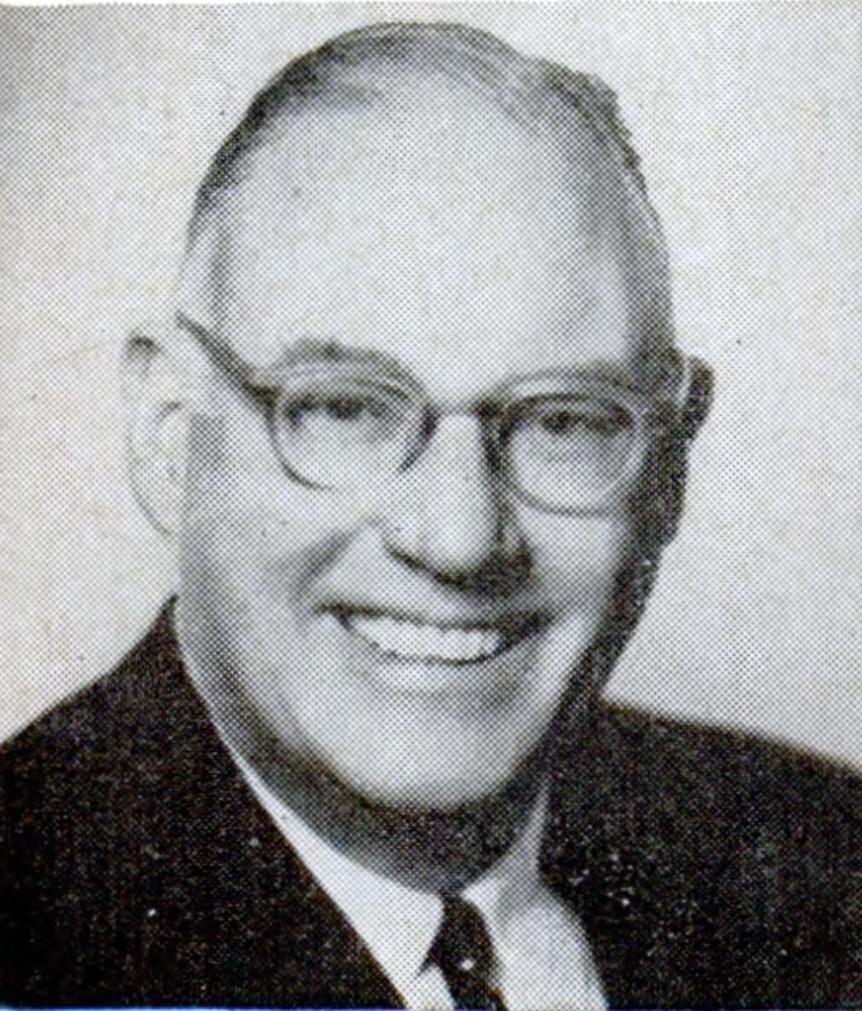
- John A. Lafore Jr. served as a U.S. Congressman for Pennsylvania's 13th congressional district from 1957 to 1961
  John A. Lafore Jr. (1905–1993), Congressman for Pennsylvania's 13th congressional district from 1957–1961
- Laurence Lafore (1917-1985), historian and novelist
- Robert Eneas Lamberton (1886–1941), 88th mayor of Philadelphia from 1940 to 1941
- John Lawrence LeConte (1825–1883), entomologist
- Donald Lippincott, (1893–1962), world class sprinter, medal winner at 1912 Summer Olympics
- Sarah Lee Lippincott, (1920–2019), professor of astronomy at Swarthmore College, director of the Sproul Observatory
- D. Herbert Lipson (1929–2017), publisher Philadelphia magazine
- Walter R. Livingston Jr. (1922–2011), architect
- Hy Lit (1934–2007), radio disc jockey and television personality
- William H. Luden (1859–1949), developed the menthol throat lozenge, founded Luden's brand and company
- Herb Lusk (1953-2022), professional football running back with Philadelphia Eagles
- Harry Lyons (1866–1912), professional baseball player

== M ==
- Harry Arista Mackey (1869–1938), football player and coach, lawyer, and politician who served as the mayor of Philadelphia 1928–1932
- Franklin J. Maloney (1899–1958), Republican member of the U.S. House of Representatives from Pennsylvania 1947–1949
- Frank Mayo (1839–1896), stage actor
- Katharine Elizabeth McBride (1904–1976), president of Bryn Mawr College 1942–1970
- Robert M. McBride (1879–1970) publisher and author
- Samuel K. McConnell Jr. (1901–1985), U.S. Congressman
- James McCrea (1848–1913), president of the Pennsylvania Railroad from 1907 to 1913
- Henry Plumer McIlhenny, (1910–1986), art collector, philanthropist, and curator at the Philadelphia Museum of Art
- Robert L. McNeil Jr. (1915–2010), chemist and pharmaceutical industry executive, responsible for commercial development, naming, and introduction of the pain reliever Tylenol
- William Morris Meredith Jr. (1919–2007), educator, poet, won Pulitzer Prize for Poetry in 1988
- Reuben Moon (1847–1919), U.S. Congressman
- Robert Charles Moon (1844–1914), ophthalmologist and publisher of books for the blind
- J. Hampton Moore (1864–1950), 83rd and 85th Mayor of Philadelphia, United States Representatives
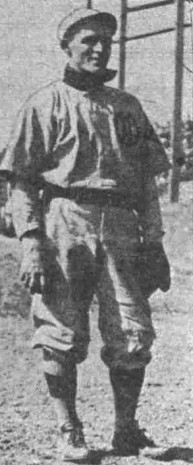
- Walter Moser was a Major League Baseball pitcher who played for the Philadelphia Phillies, the Boston Red Sox and the St. Louis Browns
  Walter Moser (1881–1946), professional baseball player
- Paul B. Moses (1929-1966), art historian and educator

== N ==
- Nellie Neilson (1873–1947), historian and educator
- Waldo Nelson (1898–1997), pediatrician, author of "Nelson Textbook of Pediatrics" and longtime editor of The Journal of Pediatrics.
- Wedgwood Nowell (1878–1957), stage and film actor and director

== O ==
- Ellis Paxson Oberholtzer (1868–1938), biographer and historical writer
- Sara Louisa Oberholtzer (1841–1930), poet, anti-smoking and anti-drinking activist, and economist
- Tinius Olsen (1845–1932), Norwegian-born, American engineer and inventor
- Charles O'Neill (1821–1893), Republican member of U.S. House of Representatives (1863–1871) & (1873–1893), member of Pennsylvania House of Representatives (1850–1852) & (1860–1861), member of Pennsylvania State Senate (1853–1854)

== P ==
- Daniel Pabst (1826–1910), cabinetmaker, worked closely with Frank Furness
- Robert E. Pattison (1850–1904), Governor of Pennsylvania 1883–1887 and 1891–1895
- Billy Paul (1934–2016), born Paul Williams, singer "Me and Mrs. Jones", "Am I Black Enough for You?"
- George Franklin Pawling (1879–1954), President of Amateur Athletic Union in 1910s, builder of the Philadelphia Arena in 1920s
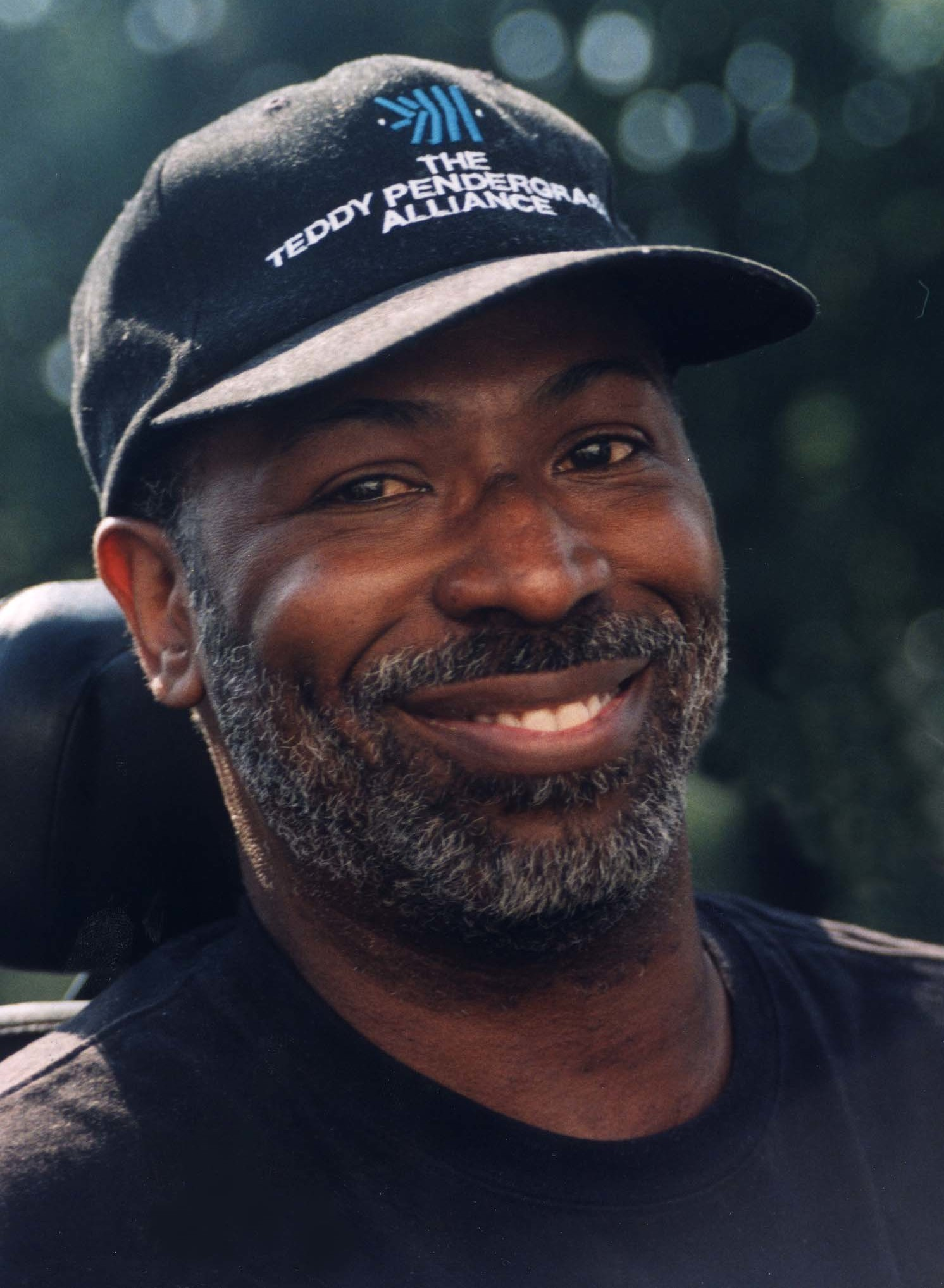
- Teddy Pendergrass was posthumously inducted into the National Rhythm & Blues Hall of Fame in 2021
  Teddy Pendergrass (1950–2010), soul and R&B singer
- J. Howard Pew (1882–1971), American philanthropist, president of Sunoco (Sun Oil Company)
- Joseph Newton Pew (1848–1912), founder of Sun Oil Company (now Sunoco) and philanthropist
- Joseph N. Pew Jr. (1886–1963), American industrialist, influential member of Republican Party
- Theodore Presser (1848–1925), founder of Music Teachers National Association, publisher of The Etude magazine, founder of Theodore Presser Company

== R ==
- Nate Ramsey (1941–2019), professional football player, #24 with Philadelphia Eagles from 1963 through 1973
- Harry C. Ransley (1863–1941), Republican member of United States House of Representatives from Pennsylvania 1921–1937
- Al Reach (1840–1928), professional baseball player, sporting good manufacturer
- Ira De Augustine Reid (1901–1968) sociologist and author who wrote extensively on the lives of Black immigrants and communities in the United States
- John Reilly (1836–1904), represented Pennsylvania's 17th congressional district from 1875 to 1877.
- Francis Richter (1854–1926), editor Sporting Life newspaper 1883–1917, refused presidency of the National League
- Ralph J. Roberts (1920–2015), co-founder Comcast
- Lawson Robertson (1883–1951), medal winner at 1904 Summer Olympics, renowned track and field coach
- Mario Romañach (1917–1984), Cuban-born modernist architect, planner, and university professor
- Jack Rose (1971–2009), musician, played American primitive guitar

== S ==
- L. Lewis Sagendorph (1842–1909), inventor and pioneer in sheet metal production
- Dennis Sandole (1913–2000), jazz guitarist, composer and music educator; mentor to John Coltrane
- William I. Schaffer (1867–1953), Pennsylvania State Supreme Court Justice
- Fritz Scheel (1852–1907), first conductor and musical director of the Philadelphia Orchestra
- Henry Walter "Slick" Schlichter (1866–1944) sports executive, co-founder and owner Philadelphia Giants Negro league baseball team, sportswriter for Philadelphia Item, referee in Thomas Eakin's 1898 painting Taking the Count
- Arthur Hoyt Scott (1875–1927) inventor of paper towel, namesake for Scott Arboretum
- Hardie Scott (1907-1999), congressperson, horseman
- John Roger Kirkpatrick Scott (1873–1945), member Pennsylvania State House of Representatives in 1899, 1909, 1911, and 1913
- Edgar Viguers Seeler (1867–1929), architect
- Coleman Sellers II (1827–1907), prominent engineer and inventor
- Orator Shafer (1851–1922), Major League Baseball player
- Taylor Shafer (1866–1945), Major League Baseball player
- John O. Sheatz (1856–1922), Pennsylvania state representative, state senator, and state treasurer
- Ben Shibe (1838–1922), sportsman, sporting goods salesman, namesake of Shibe Park at 21st & Lehigh
- Hannah Shipley, Elizabeth Shipley, and Katharine Shipley founders of Shipley School in Bryn Mawr, Pennsylvania
- Rachel H. Shoemaker (1838–1915), founder of the National School of Elocution and Oratory in Philadelphia.
- Matthew Simpson (1811–1884), notable Bishop of the Methodist Episcopal Church, delivered eulogy at funeral of Abraham Lincoln
- Charles Emory Smith (1842–1908), U.S. Minister to Russia 1890–1891, U.S. Postmaster General 1898-1902
- David Smyrl (1935–2016), actor and writer, known for his role of Mr. Handford (Hooper's Store) on Sesame Street
- Albert Henry Smyth (1863–1907), editor of the Writings of Benjamin Franklin
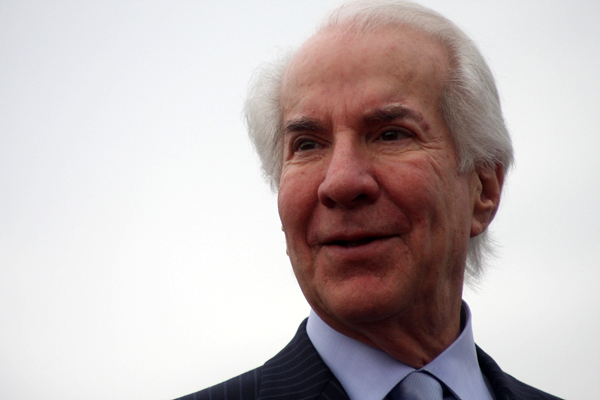
- Ed Snider founded the Philadelphia Flyers in the National Hockey League
  Ed Snider (1933–2016) Chair of Comcast Spectacor, owner Philadelphia Flyers, former owner Philadelphia 76ers, part-owner of Philadelphia Eagles
- Edward Taylor Snow (1844–1913) landscape artist, collector
- Pearl Pinkerton McClelland Snowden (1875–1943), woman for whom the Rhode Island mansion High Watch (now owned by Taylor Swift) was built
- Wilson Starbuck (1897–1983), playwright, comic strip writer, author, and United States Navy officer
- Alice Barber Stephens (1858–1932), engraver and magazine illustrator
- John Batterson Stetson (1830–1906), American hat manufacturer and founder of the John B. Stetson Company
- George H. Stockman (1833–1912), Medal of Honor recipient
- Marion Stokes (1929–2012), open access television producer, civil rights activist, librarian, and archivist who videotaped more than 70,000 tapes of television news over 35 years
- John Streaker, aka Cub Stricker (1859–1937), professional baseball player
- Edwin Sydney Stuart (1853–1937), Mayor of Philadelphia 1891–1895, Governor of Pennsylvania 1907–1911.
- Henry Winter Syle (1846-1890), first deaf person to be ordained a priest in the Episcopal Church in the United States

== T ==
- Frederick Winslow Taylor (1856–1915), mechanical and industrial engineer, management consultant, and "father of scientific management".
- Charles W. Thomas (politician) (1860–1907), member of the Pennsylvania House of Representatives and Pennsylvania Senate
- Dorothy Burr Thompson (1900–2001), aka "DBT," classical archaeologist and art historian at Bryn Mawr College
- Homer Thompson (1906-2000), Canadian classical archaeologist, specializing in ancient Greece
- Joseph Earlston Thropp (1847–1927), Republican member of the United States House of Representatives from Pennsylvania 1898–1900
- John Cresson Trautwine (1810–1883), civil engineer, architect, and engineering writer
- Horace Trumbauer (1868–1938), architect
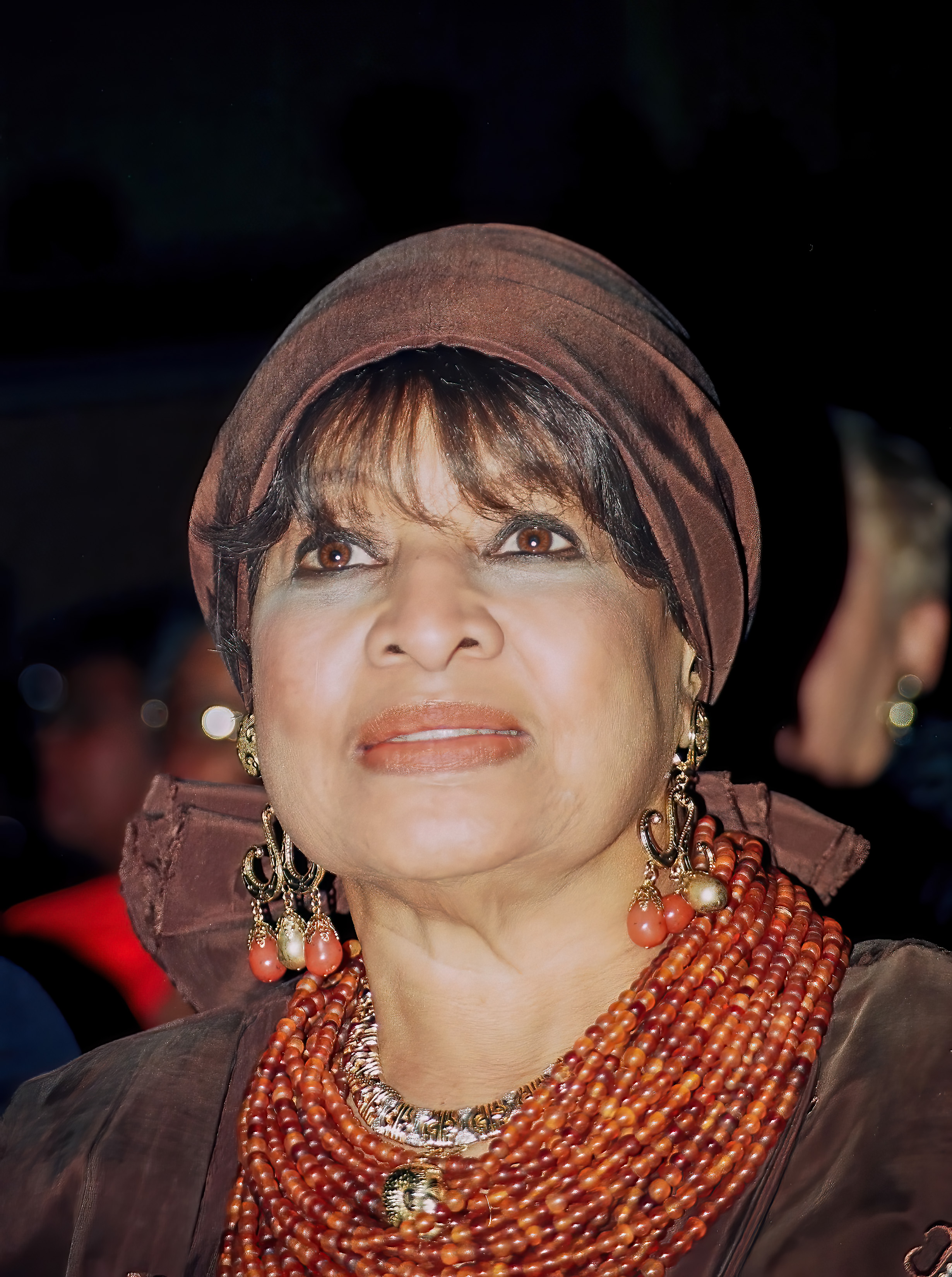
- C. Delores Tucker was a civil right activist who lead a campaign against rap music in the 1990s
  C. Delores Tucker (1927–2005), civil rights and anti-rap activist
- Ellwood J. Turner (1886–1948), Pennsylvania State Representative for Delaware County (1925–1948), Speaker of the Pennsylvania House of Representatives (1939–1941)
- Thomas Lovatt Turner, aka Tink Turner (1890–1962), professional baseball player

== V ==
- Flora M. Vare (1874–1962), Pennsylvania State Senator 1925–1928, wife of Edwin H. Vare
- Glenna Collett-Vare (1903–1989), American amateur golfer, member World Golf Hall of Fame, "The Female Bobby Jones"
- William Scott Vare (1867–1934), U.S. Senator-elect, U.S. Congressman, Pennsylvania State Senator, Republican political boss
- Moses Veale (1832–1917), Medal of Honor recipient

== W ==
- William Wagner (1796–1885), founder of the Wagner Free Institute of Science
- Charles F. Warwick (1852–1913), author, lawyer, and Republican politician who served as mayor of Philadelphia 1895–1899
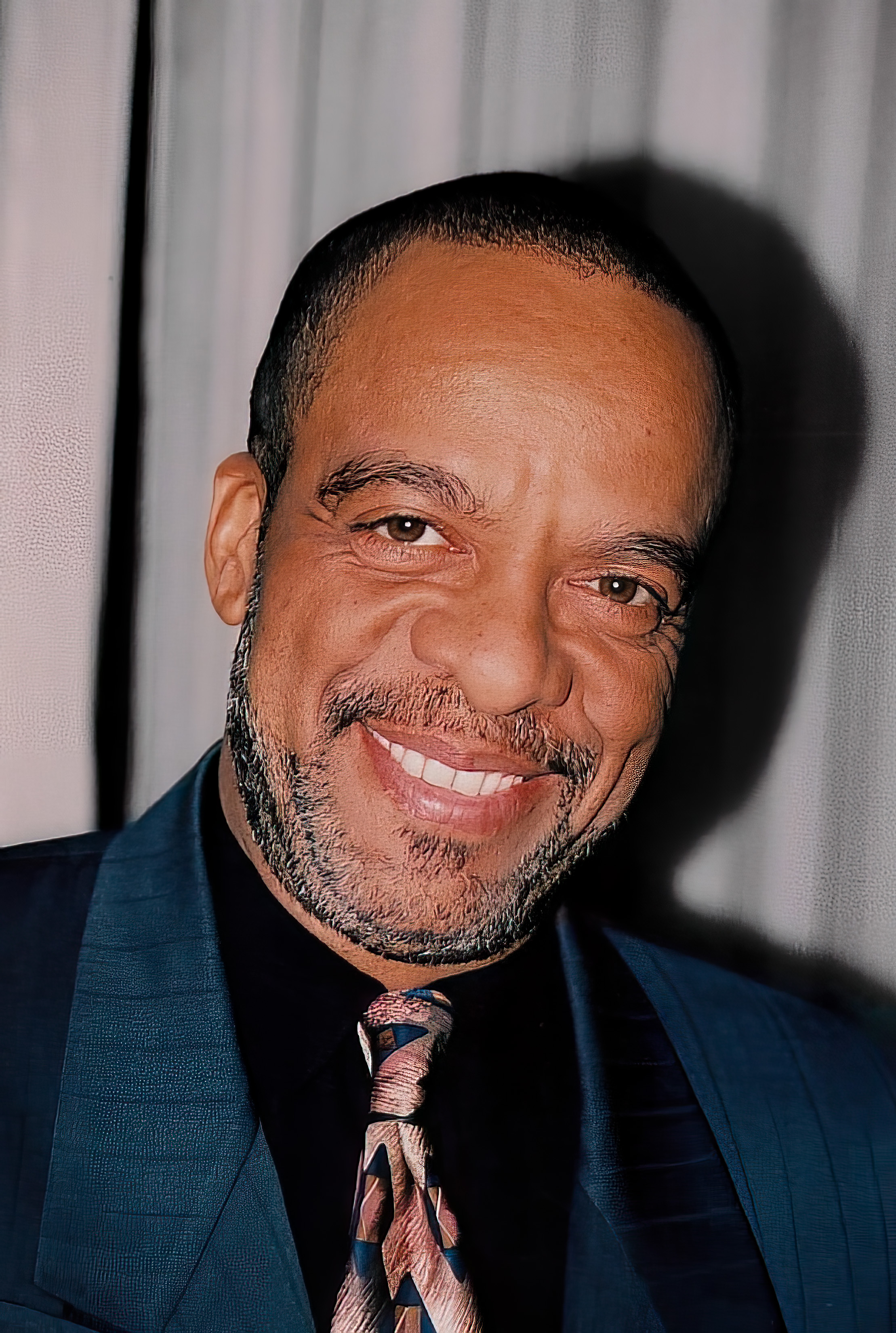
- Grover Washington Jr. is considered one of the founders of the smooth-jazz genre
  Grover Washington Jr. (1943–1999), American jazz-funk and soul-jazz saxophonist
- George Austin Welsh (1878–1970), represented Pennsylvania's 6th congressional district from 1923 to 1932.
- Donald H. White (1921–2016), composer, educator at Depauw University
- Peter Arrell Browne Widener II (1895–1948), racehorse owner/breeder
- Elwood N. Williams (1842–1921), Medal of Honor recipient
- Henry Williams (1834–1917), peacetime recipient of the Medal of Honor
- Hugh Irvine Wilson (1879–1925), golf course designer
- James H. Windrim (1840–1919), architect
- John T. Windrim (1866–1934), architect
- Margaret F. Winner (1866–1937) illustrator, portrait painter, and miniaturist
- Septimus Winner (1827–1905), songwriter - Ten Little Indians, Listen to the Mockingbird, et al.
- David Duffield Wood (1838–1910), blind composer, educator, musician, organist and choir master at St. Stephen's Episcopal Church for 46 years
- Milton Work (1864–1934), world expert on whist, bridge whist, auction and contract bridge
- Harry Wright (1835–1895), pioneer of professional baseball, member of the Baseball Hall of Fame

== Y ==
- Charlotte Yhlen (1839–1920), Swedish physician

== Z ==
- Ilya Zhitomirskiy (1989–2011), social media pioneer, cofounder Diaspora
