= Edward Snow =

Edward Snow may refer to:

- Edward A. Snow, American poet and translator
- Edward H. Snow (1865–1932), Utah politician and educator
- Edward Rowe Snow (1902–1982), Boston historian
- Edward Taylor Snow (1844–1913), Philadelphia painter
