= Hückel =

Hückel or Huckel may refer to:

- Erich Hückel (1896-1980), German physicist and chemist
  - Debye–Hückel equation (named after Peter Debye and Erich Hückel), in chemistry, a method of calculating activity coefficients
  - Hückel method (named after Erich Hückel), a method for the determination of energies of molecular orbitals
    - Extended Hückel method, considers also sigma orbitals (whereas the original Hückel method only considers pi orbitals)
  - Hückel's rule (named after Erich Hückel), a method of determining aromaticity in organic molecules
- Vera Huckel (1908-1999), American mathematician and aerospace engineer
- Walter Hückel (1895-1973), German chemist
- Wolfgang Hückel (born 1936), German diplomat, Ambassador of the GDR in Chad
