= Emma Dunning Banks =

American actress, dramatic reader, teacher and writer

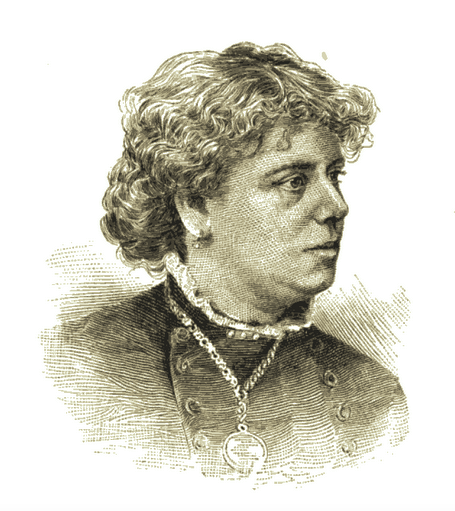
(1887)

(signature)

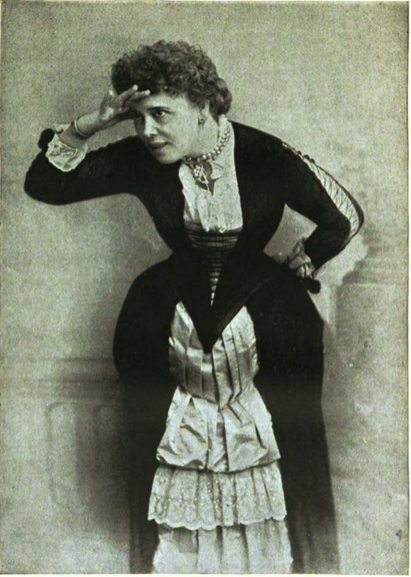
Photo from Original Recitations, 1890

Emma Dunning Banks (stage name Dorothy Crane; 1856–1931) was an American actress, dramatic reader, teacher, and writer. She received her education at the National School of Elocution and Oratory in Philadelphia, Pennsylvania, where she graduated and earned major honors in 1883. Banks subsequently toured extensively, giving notable dramatic readings and producing comedies such as Engaged and Pygmalion and Galatea. As a writer, she was the author of Banks's Recitations with Lesson-Talks and contributed articles and original recitations to both U.S. and British periodicals.

== Biography ==
Banks graduated from the National School of Elocution and Oratory in Philadelphia. In 1883, she won a large gold and silver medal at the city's Academy of Music. She also studied privately for four years under New York City and Boston teachers.

Her notable performances included the "Curse Scene" from Leah the Forsaken and the Malediction of Medea. In 1904, in the Bridgeport Opera House, she produced two of W. S. Gilbert's most successful comedies, Engaged and Pygmalion and Galatea, which the press praised. Eugenia Williamson Hume was a pupil.

She was also the author of Banks's Recitations with Lesson-Talks. Some of her articles appeared in The Voice, while the British press reprinted some of her original recitations.

Her husband was Edgar Granville Banks.

Banks was at her New York City address on Saturdays but otherwise made her home in Bridgeport, Connecticut, where she died April 8, 1931.

== Selected works ==
- Emma Dunning Bank's Original Recitations: With Lesson-talks, 1890 (text)
- Flossie Lane's Marriage, 1890 (text)
- One Thanksgiving Day Out West, 1908 (text)
- Flying Jim's Last Leap, 1908 (text)
