= Dora Adele Shoemaker =

American educator, poet and playwright

- Born: August 13, 1873; Philadelphia, Pennsylvania, U.S.
- Died: March 16, 1962 (aged 88); Bala Cynwyd, Pennsylvania, U.S.
- Education: Friends Select School; National School of Elocution and Oratory; University of Pennsylvania; Marywood College
- Occupations: Educator; writer
- Parent: Rachel H. Shoemaker
- Writing career
- Genres: Poetry; plays

Dora Adele Shoemaker (1873–1962) was an American educator, poet, and playwright born in Philadelphia, Pennsylvania. She was the daughter of the founders of the National School of Elocution and Oratory, where she later received multiple degrees and served as principal from 1915 until the late 1930s. In addition to teaching at several institutions, Shoemaker was the author of the poetry collection Out O'Doors and the plays A Patron of Art and A Fighting Chance. She also lectured widely on literary subjects and elocution.

== Early life and education ==
Shoemaker was born in Philadelphia, Pennsylvania, August 13, 1873. Her parents were Rachel H. Shoemaker and Jacob V. Shoemaker, founders of the National School of Elocution and Oratory, Philadelphia. Dora's brother, Frank W. Shoemaker, was the head of the Penn Publishing Company.

She was educated at Friends Select School and the National School of Elocution and Oratory (Bachelor of Elocution and Master of Oratory, 1915), with further specialized instruction at the University of Pennsylvania. She received a master's degree at Marywood College (now Marywood University (Scranton, Pennsylvania).

== Career ==
From 1915, Shoemaker served as principal of the National School of Elocution and Oratory. Renamed the Shoemaker School of Speech and Drama, its course offerings included journalism and radio technique. Shoemaker headed the school until the late 1930s. She was also a teacher at Marywood College, St. John's Catholic Junto (Philadelphia), and Neff Dramatic School (Philadelphia).

She was the author of Out O'Doors (poetry book), A Patron of Art (play) and A Fighting chance (play). She lectured on literary subjects and elocution.

== Death ==
Dora Adele Shoemaker died at her home in Bala Cynwyd, Pennsylvania, March 16, 1962.

== Selected works ==
=== Plays ===
- A Patron of Art (1901)
- A Fighting Chance, Or, For the Blue Or the Gray: A Play in Three Acts (1900) (Text)
- The Girls of 1776: A Drama in Three Acts (1905) (Text)

=== Poetry collections ===
- Out O'Doors
