= Frank E. Sagendorph, 2nd =

American industrialist (1883-1972)

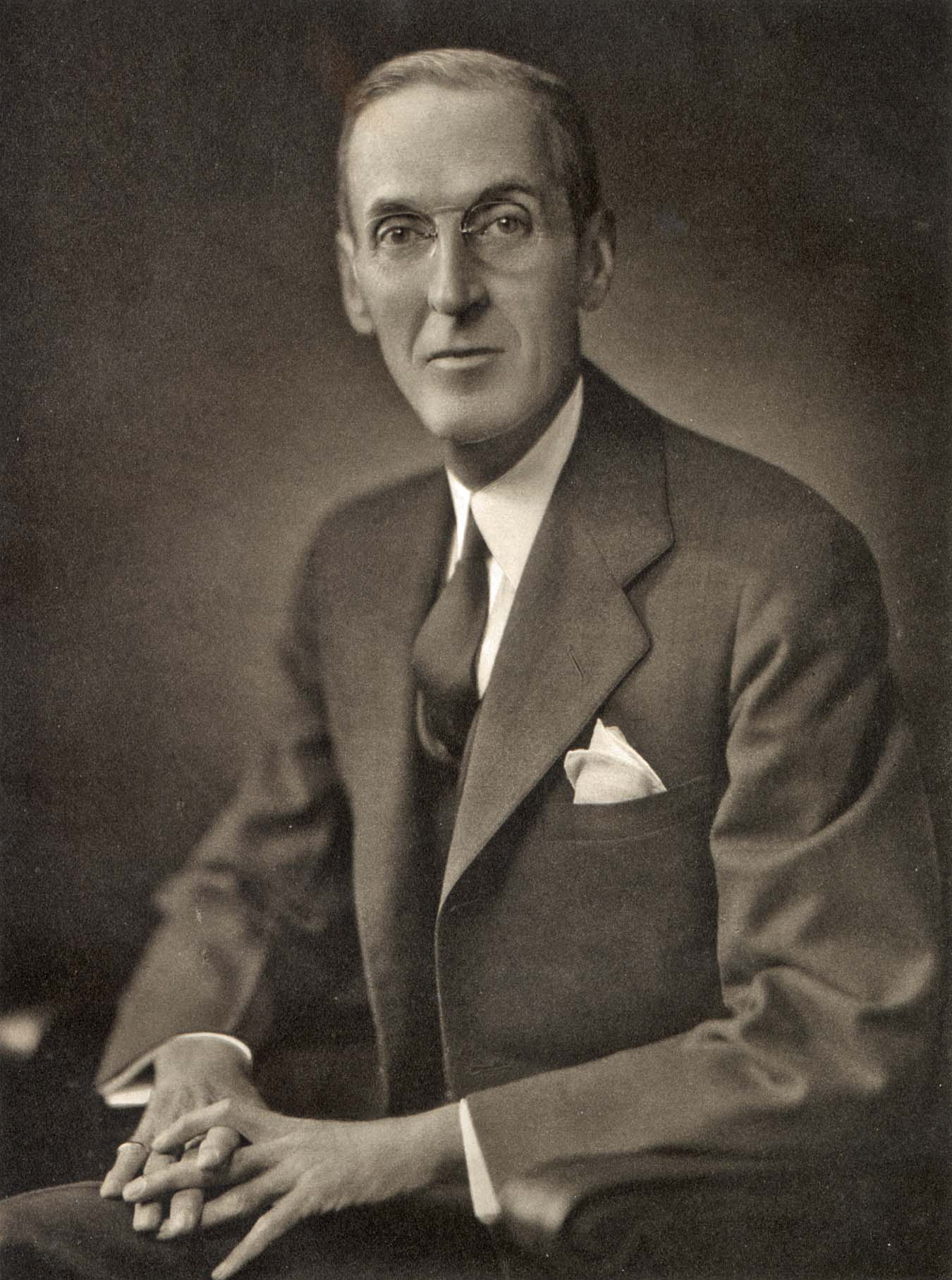
- Born: Frank Elijah Sagendorph 2nd March 28, 1883; Cincinnati, Ohio, US
- Died: May 5, 1972 (aged 89); Rosemont, Pennsylvania, US
- Resting place: Arlington Cemetery (Pennsylvania)
- Occupations: Industrialist, businessman

Frank Elijah Sagendorph, 2nd (March 28, 1883 – May 5, 1972) was a leading Philadelphia industrialist and president of the Penn Metal Corporation of Pennsylvania, also known as Penco, which was headquartered in Philadelphia, Pennsylvania.

== Life and career ==
Frank Elijah Sagendorph, 2d, was born in Cincinnati, Ohio. He was six years old in 1889 when his family moved to Philadelphia. He was the second son of L. Lewis Sagendorph and Catherine Crainor.

He attended the Philadelphia public schools, and graduated from Peirce Business College in Philadelphia. In 1901 he became associated with the Penn Metal Corporation of Pennsylvania, a sheet metal manufacturing company, which his father founded in 1869 in Staunton, Virginia as the Sagendorph Iron Roofing and Corrugating Company. The company moved to Cincinnati in 1879 and then to Philadelphia in 1889. Originally serving as an apprentice, Sagendorph was made an engineer and draftsman in 1903. In 1905 he became a junior executive of the organization, so serving until 1907. His father, L. Lewis Sagendorph, died in 1909 at which time his older brother George Adam Sagendorph became president of the company. In 1912 he became vice-president, so serving until he was made its president in 1933 when he and his brother, George, divided the company. In 1919 he became a director of Penn Metal, and still served until his retirement in the late 1960s at which time his son, Frank E. Sagendorph 3rd was heading the company.

== Other activities ==
In addition to his other business activities, F. E. Sagendorph, 2nd was general manager and vice-president of his wife's family company, the J. Milton Hagy Waste Works from 1907 to 1912. From his interest in general business, civic and political life, Sagendorph formed many close associations and organization connections throughout his career. He was a member of the National Association of Manufacturers and of its patents and research committee; a member of the Propeller Club of the United States, Port of New York, member of Chamber of Commerce and Board of Trade, Philadelphia, New York Board of Trade, Franklin Institute and the American Iron and Steel Institute. He was a Republican in politics, and was a member of the vestry of the Protestant Episcopal Church of St. John the Evangelist in Lansdowne, Pennsylvania.

== Personal life ==
Frank E. Sagendorph, 2d, married Elizabeth Hagy on October 3, 1905, at Lansdowne, Pennsylvania. Together they had three children, William L Sagendorph, Frank E. Sagendorph 3rd, and Suzanne Sagendorph Welsh.

== Death ==
Frank E. Sagendorph, 2nd died May 5, 1972, and was buried at Arlington Cemetery in Upper Darby, Pennsylvania.
