= Eugenia Williamson Hume =

American elocutionist and educator

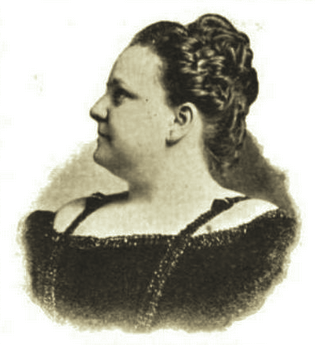
Portrait photo from Werner's Magazine, 1899

Eugenia Williamson Hume (1865–1899) was a 19th-century American elocutionist and educator. She was one of the best-educated and most accomplished women in St. Louis, Missouri, in her day.

== Early life and education ==
Eugenia Williamson was born in 1865. She was the daughter of Dr. and Mrs. E. J. Williamson. She was of old Anglo-American ancestry. Hume always lived in St. Louis.

Hume's early training was with Mary Hogan Ludlum. She also studied for an extended period with Emma Dunning Banks. In 1889, Hume graduated from the National School of Elocution and Oratory.

== Career ==
She began teaching at 18 and was known as a teacher for many years before graduation from elocutionary school.

Hume was prominent in elocutionary work in St. Louis. She and her sister, Mazy Williamson, also gave elocutionary entertainments in various parts of the West. In 1897, the sisters gave entertainments together in Missouri, Eugenia doing the poses and Mazy giving the recitations, some of the most successful of which were by Banks.

Hume was a charter member of the St. Louis Branch of the Association of Elocutionists and a member of various other societies and institutions. She was also actively engaged in religious and benevolent work.

== Personal life and death ==
On April 18, 1899, she married Dr. John R. Hume, a leading physician of St. Louis and professor of physiology at Barnes Medical College.

Eugenia Williamson Hume died in St. Louis on October 13, 1899, at the age of 34 from a valvular lesion of the heart after an illness of five hours. Her burial was in Bellefontaine Cemetery.
