= Mrs. Findley Braden =

American author, newspaper editor, elocutionist (1858–1939)

Anna Braden
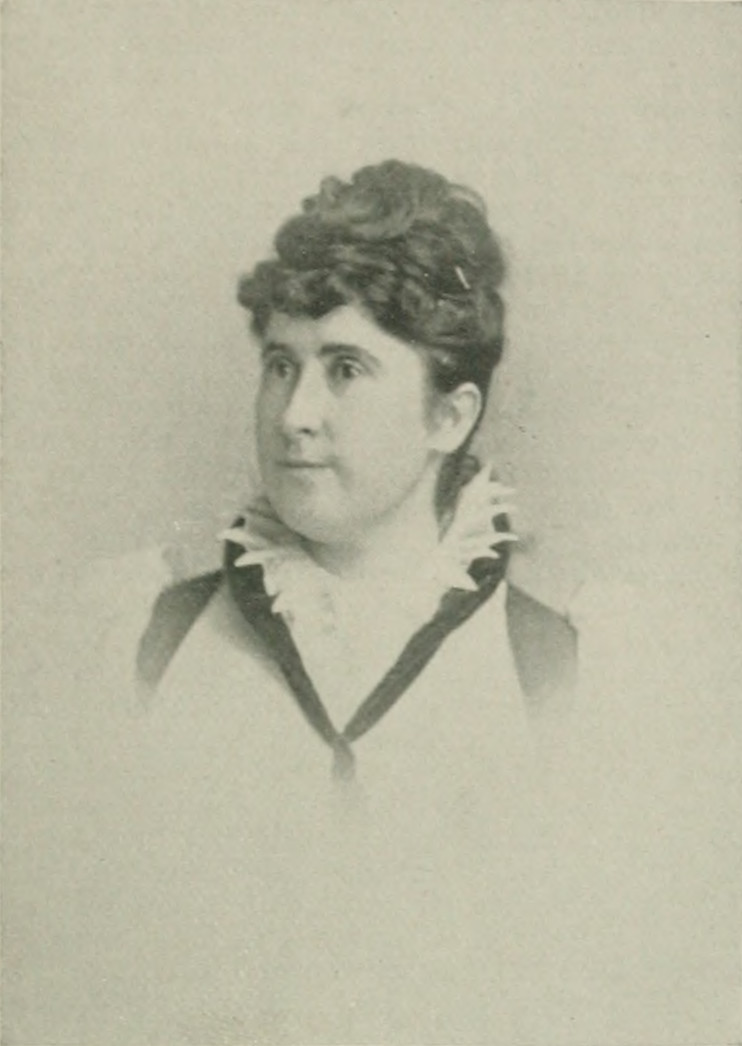
- Portrait from "A Woman of the Century"
- Born: Anna Margaretta Rile; January 11, 1858; Montgomery, Pennsylvania, U.S.
- Died: 1939 (aged 80–81)
- Other name: "Madge"
- Education: National School of Elocution and Oratory
- Occupations: author; newspaper editor; elocutionist
- Spouse: William Findley Braden (m. 1880; died 1933)
- Relatives: Joseph Reed
- Writing career
- Pen name: Mrs. Findley Braden; Madge Rile
- Notable work: Something new to recite

Mrs. Findley Braden was the pen name of Anna Braden (née, Rile; January 11, 1858 – 1939), an American writer, newspaper editor, and elocutionist from Pennsylvania. Before her marriage, she published under the name "Madge Rile" and other pseudonyms. Over the course of her career, she wrote more than 700 sketches, poems, and serials, contributed to leading newspapers and magazines in New York City, Boston, and Philadelphia, and published several volumes of poetry. She also composed song lyrics, delivered public recitations, and wrote works in multiple dialects, including Scotch, Irish, African-American, Dutch, and Quaker. In addition to her literary work, she served as editor of the Presbyterian Visitor, a monthly newspaper based in Philadelphia.

== Early life and education ==
Anna Margaretta (nickname, "Madge") Rile was born in Montgomery, Pennsylvania, January 11, 1858. Her parents were John Conver and Sarah (Frantz) Rile. She was of English and German descent, and her ancestors lived in or near Philadelphia, Pennsylvania, for over a century and a half. Her father was John Conver Rile. Her mother's maiden name was Frantz. She is fifth in direct line of descent from Joseph Reed, a Founding Father of the United States, his daughter being her great-grandmother.

She graduated from the National School of Elocution and Oratory, Philadelphia.

== Career ==
At the age of 15, Braden began writing for the newspapers and magazines. Beginning in 1874, she wrote under her maiden name, "Madge Rile", and several pen names.

Since her marriage, she adopted her husband's name, signing her articles "Mrs. Findley Braden". She wrote over 700 humorous and pathetic sketches, poems and serials, many of which appeared in the secular journals of New York City, Boston, and Philadelphia. She also wrote a number of songs that found their way into public favor. She was equally at home in the five dialects, Scotch, Irish, Negro, Dutch, and Quaker. She published several volumes of poems.

Braden served as the editor of the monthly newspaper, Presbyterian Visitor, established in 1888, and published by Graves & Banks, Philadelphia.

== Personal life ==
In 1880, she married William Findley Braden (1852–1933), of Ohio, and they resided in Philadelphia. There were no children.

Braden was a member of the Presbyterian Church.

Anna Rile Braden died in 1939.

== Musical compositions ==
- "Dreaming of Sweetheart Prue", words by Mrs. Findley Braden, music by W. A. Webb (1912)

== Selected works ==
=== Books ===
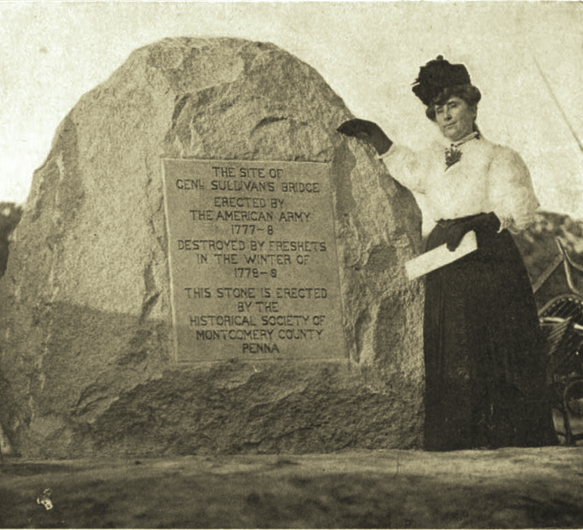
Mrs. Findley Braden (Something new to recite, 1908)

- Something new to recite (1908) (Text)

=== Poems ===
- "Heart-Murder" (1894)
- "Pills at Poughkeepsie" (1894)
- "She's In the Smart Set Now"
- "He Fought with Washington"
- "You Hae But Ae Mither To Lose" (1905)
- "Thae Auld Laird's Secret" (1918)
- "What the Lord Had Done For Him" (1918)
- "Fence o' Scripture Faith" (1918)

=== Plays ===
- Convention of Realistic Readers (1918)

=== Recitations ===
- "The Fence O' Scripture Faith" (1887)
- "Rejoicin' at De Co'ners" (Negro dialect) (1894)
- "Con Cannon's Christmas Gift" (Irish dialect) (1899)
- "Mickey's Proposal" (Irish dialect) (1899)
- "A Bridal Soliloguy" (1899)
- "The Skeleton Soldier" (1899)
