= Russell Ball =

American photographer (1891–1942)

- Russell Ball at work in 1931. Picture Post magazine
- Born: March 24, 1891; Philadelphia, Pennsylvania, U.S.
- Died: June 12, 1942 (aged 51)
- Resting place: West Laurel Hill Cemetery, Bala Cynwyd, Pennsylvania, U.S.
- Occupation: Photographer
- Spouse: Gladys Hall

Russell Earp Ball (November 24, 1891 – June 12, 1942) was an American photographer who made film stills for the Hollywood (film industry) and photographic portraits of many of the film stars of the 1920s and 1930s.

== Early life ==
Ball was born in Philadelphia on March 24, 1891. He began to learn photography at the age of 12. In 1910, after the death of his father, he worked as a salesman for the Gas Light Manufacturing Company to support his mother. He moved to New York and on February 1, 1912, he married the film journalist Gladys Hall, with whom he had two children, while working as a newspaper photographer.

== Career ==
He established his reputation as a photographer in the New York working in Broadway theatre in 1923. He specialized in making stills and portraits for the Shubert Organization. He worked as an independent celebrity photographer and shot for Photoplay magazine and Motion Picture Magazine.

His photography style caught the interest of Rudolph Valentino and Ball was hired to shoot portraits of Valentino and his wife, Natacha Rambova, as well as film stills for Valentino's movie Monsieur Beaucaire. He also photographed Gloria Swanson for her film Zara.

Metro-Goldwyn-Mayer (MGM) was impressed with his work and hired him as an independent consultant on the East Coast. He photographed Greta Garbo in New York when she first arrived from Sweden. Ball moved to Benedict Canyon, Los Angeles with his family in the late 1920s and continued to work as an independent photographer for magazines and stars such as Warner Baxter and Lila Lee. He shot the film stills and portraits for Gloria Swanson's film What a Widow!. He also worked for Paramount, Caddo, and MGM on the West Coast.

He wrote an article in Picture Play magazine about making celebrity portraits. He gave one word descriptions for some of the famous subjects of his photography. He described Lilyan Tashman as "crystal"; Laura La Plante as "dovelike"; Estelle Taylor as "exotic"; and Evelyn Brent as "mysterious".

He opened his own studio at 9528 Brighton Way, Beverly Hills to work for private patrons and celebrities at the end of the 1920s. His famous clientele included John Boles, Louise Brooks, Ruth Chatterton, Carol Dempster, Mary Eaton, Madge Evans, Ann Harding, Jean Harlow, Phyllis Haver, Doris Kenyon, Jeanette MacDonald, Florine McKinney, Mary Pickford, Esther Ralston, and Norma Talmadge.

== Death and legacy ==
He died on June 12, 1942, of a heart attack and was interred at West Laurel Hill Cemetery in Bala Cynwyd, Pennsylvania.

His work was exhibited at the Museum of Modern Art from December 5, 1980, to February 28, 1981, as part of the exhibition Hollywood Portrait Photographers 1921-1941.

== Images ==
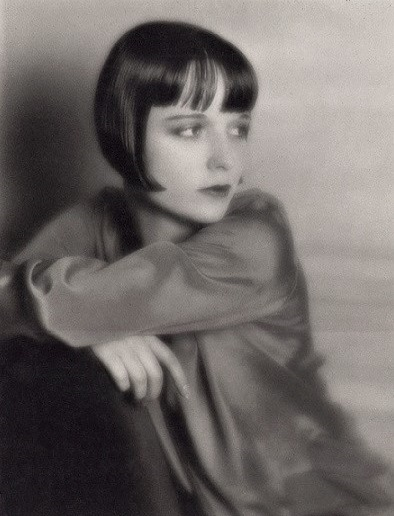
Louise Brooks, 1920s

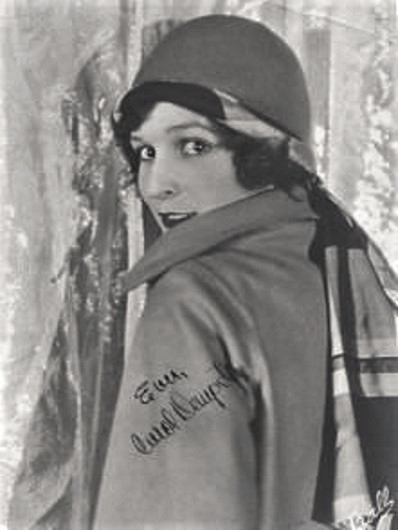
Carol Dempster, 1920s

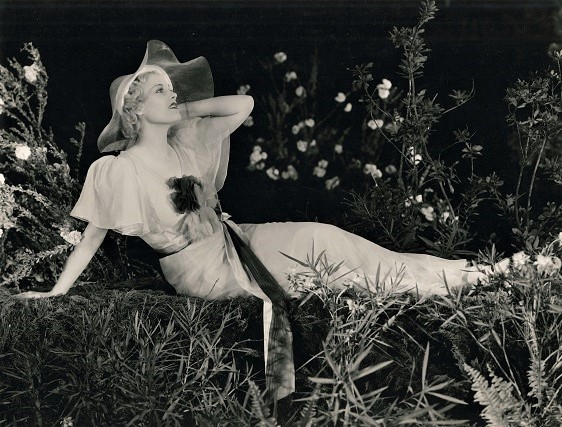
Esther Ralston in Sadie McKee, 1934

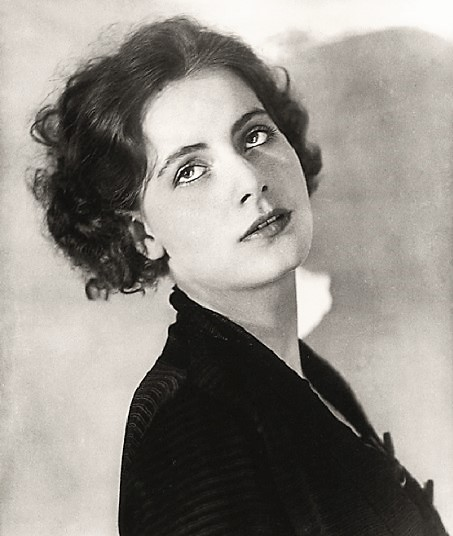
Greta Garbo, 1925

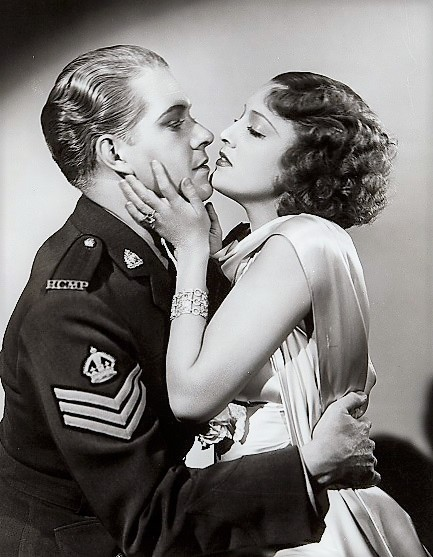
Nelson Eddy and Jeanette MacDonald in Rose Marie, 1936

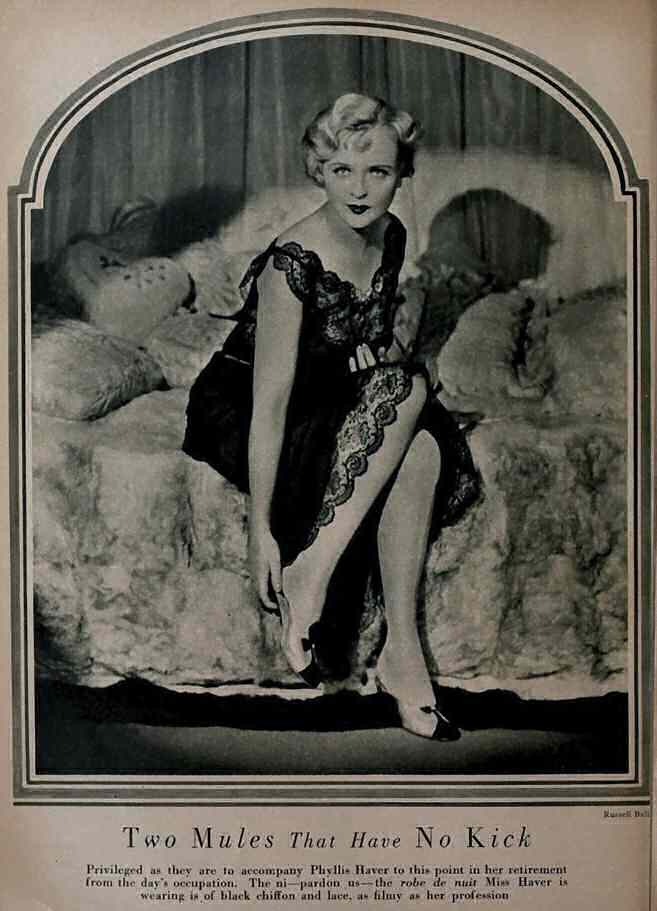
Phyllis Haver, 1928

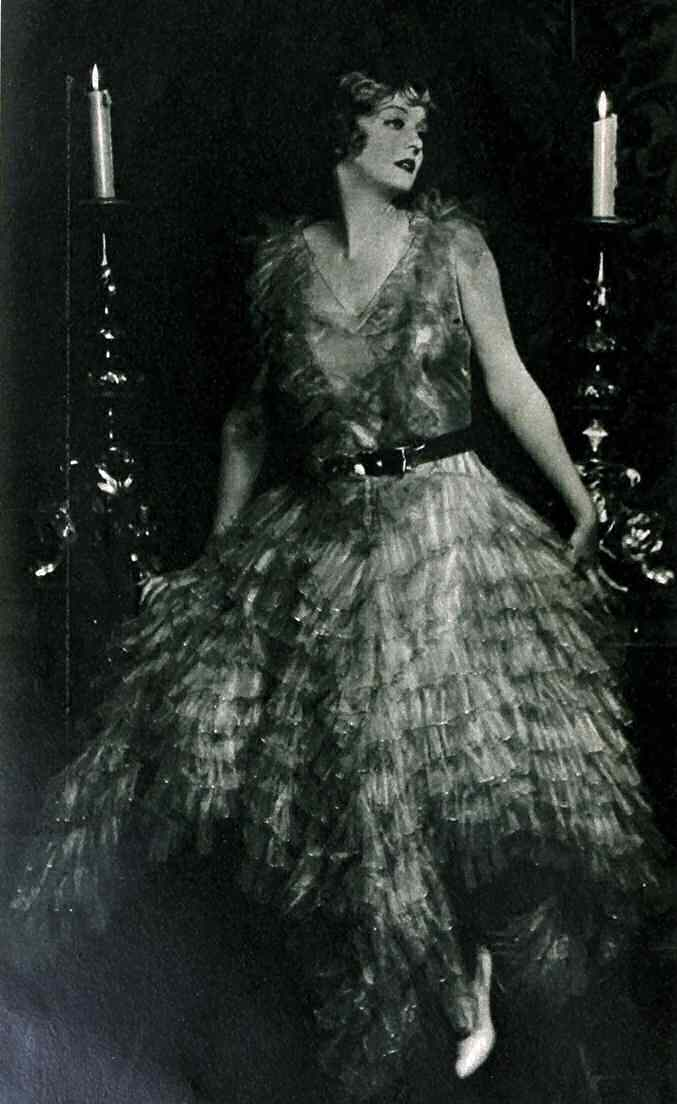
Doris Kenyon, 1928

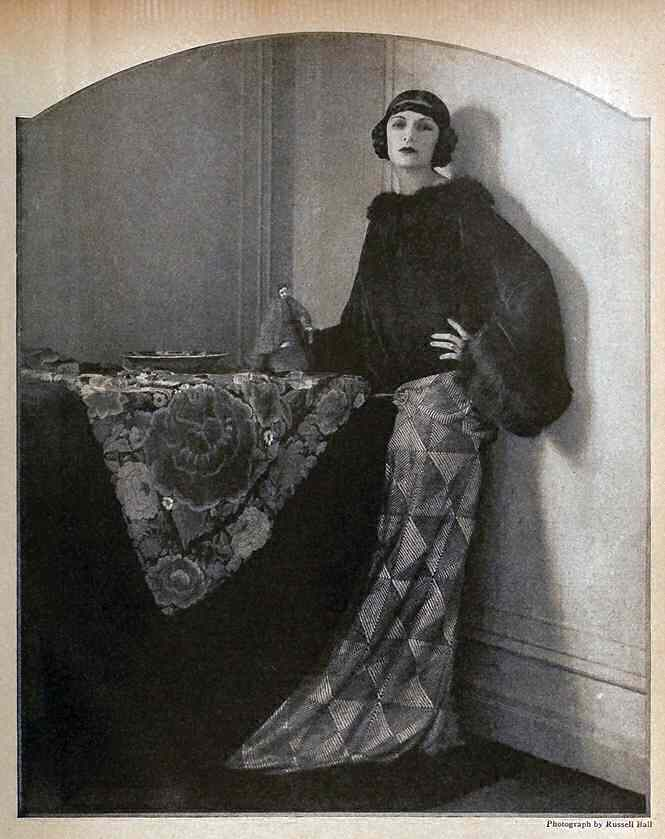
Natacha Rambova (Mrs Valentino), 1924

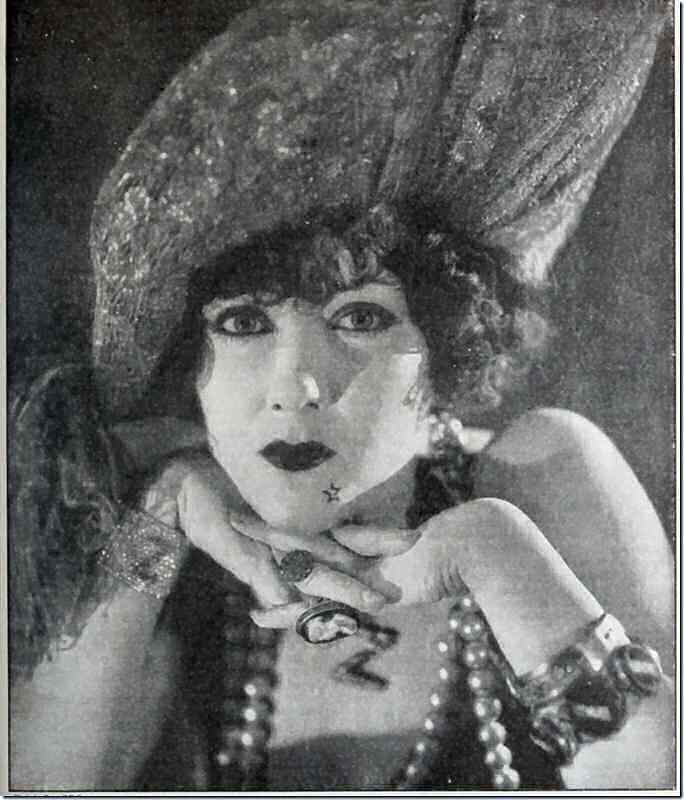
Gloria Swanson, 1923

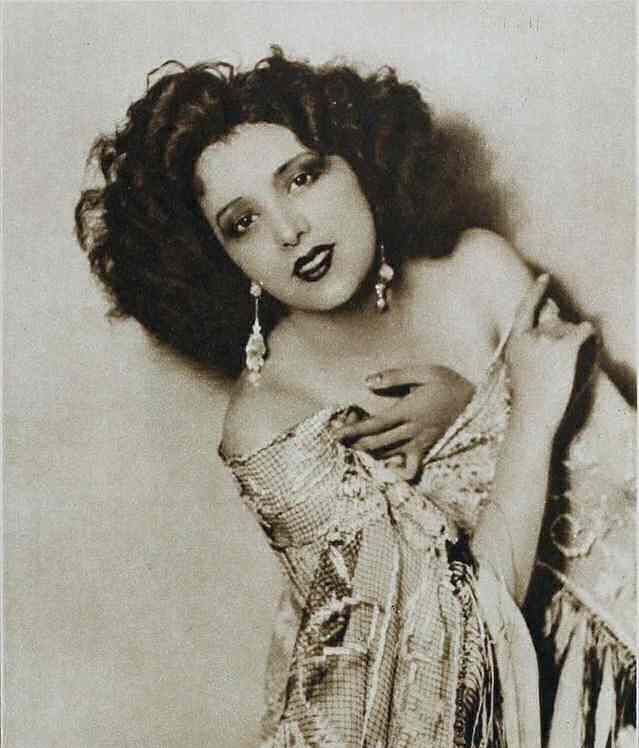
Estelle Taylor, 1930

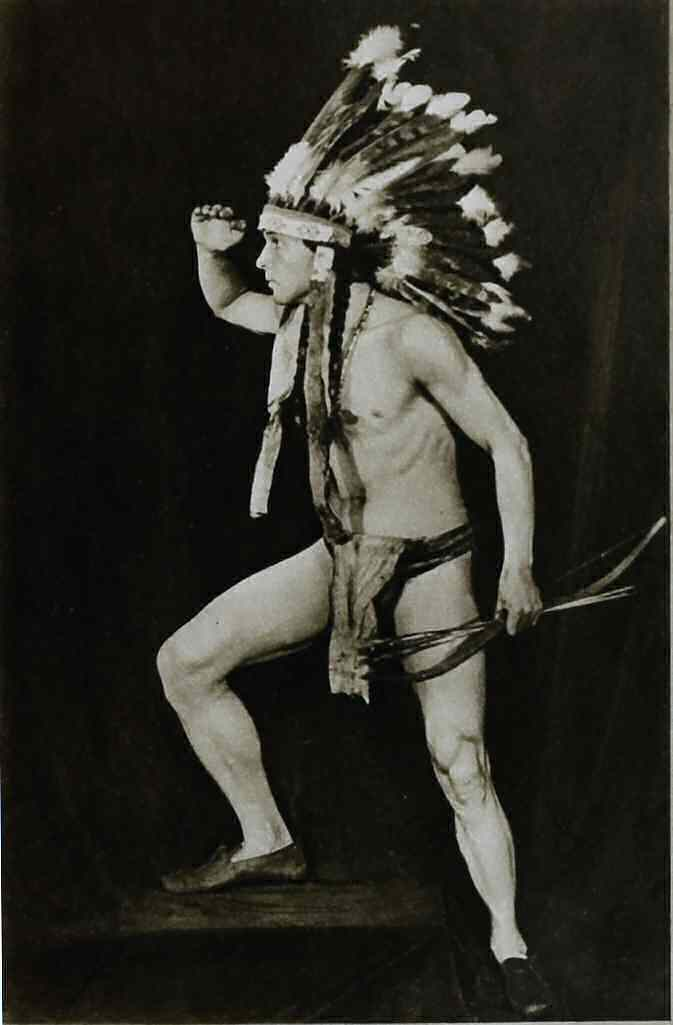
Rudolph Valentino as a native American chief, 1923
