= National School of Elocution and Oratory =

- Philadelphia, Pennsylvania, U.S.

Information
- Other name: Shoemaker School of Speech and Drama
- Type: college
- Established: 1873
- Founders: Jacob and Rachel H. Shoemaker
- Closed: late 1930s
- Principal: Dora Adele Shoemaker

National School of Elocution and Oratory (later, Shoemaker School of Speech and Drama) was an American school for speech arts, focused on rhetoric and elocution. It was established by Jacob and Rachel H. Shoemaker in Philadelphia, 1873. Attention was given to conversation and oratory, vocal culture, reading, and recitation. It awarded Bachelor's and master's degrees. From 1915, their daughter, Dora Adele Shoemaker, served as principal, renaming the school "Shoemaker School of Speech and Drama" and adding coursework in journalism and radio technique. The school closed in the late 1930s.

== History ==
Professor Jacob W. Shoemaker (1842–1880) studied of the principles of rhetoric and elocution, taught these extensively in institutes throughout Pennsylvania, and from 1866, labored in Philadelphia to build up a school that should embody and present these principles with full effect. His enthusiasm and persistence gradually attracted enough pupils and assistants to enable him to carry out his plans, and in the autumn of 1873, the National School of Elocution and Oratory was established. In 1874, its first catalogue was issued, showing an enrolment of 88 students for that year. In 1875, its scope and course were much extended, and a charter was secured for it from the legislature of the State. By September 1880, it was said that not less than 3,000 students came under its instruction, and that at least 600 lectures and readings were given before educational bodies and lyceums.

Prof. Shoemaker died in 1880, and the institution was carried on for several years under the direction of his widow, Mrs. Shoemaker, who had previously acted as an assistant teacher. In 1886, she was vice-president, the Presidency having been accepted by Dr. Edward Brooks, formerly Principal of the State Normal School at Millersville (now Millersville University of Pennsylvania).

From 1915, Dora Adele Shoemaker served as principal. Renamed the Shoemaker School of Speech and Drama, its course offerings included journalism and radio technique. Dora headed the school until the late 1930s.

== Notable alumni ==
- Joseph Elijah Armstrong, politician
- Maud Babcock, educator
- Emma Dunning Banks, actress, dramatic reader, teacher, and writer
- Anna Braden, author, newspaper editor
- Martha Hughes Cannon, politician, physician
- John O. Crosby, educator
- Cora Smith Eaton, suffragist, physician and mountaineer
- Eugenia Williamson Hume, elocutionist and educator
- Loraine Immen, philanthropist, elocutionist, author, social leader
- Sarah McGehee Isom, orator, educator
- Reuben Moon, United States Representative

== Selected works ==
- The Elocutionist's Annual.-Philadelphia, The National School of Oratory.
- Lillle People's Speaker.-Philadelphia, The National School of Oratory.
- Young Folks' Dialogues.-Philadelphia, The National School of Oratory.
- Young Folks' Entertainments.—By E. C. and L. J. Rook. Philadelphia, The National School of Oratory.
- Choice Humor: -For reading and recitation.—Philadelphia, The National School of Oratory.
- Practical Elocution.-By J. W. Shoemaker. Philadelphia, National School of Elocution and Oratory.
- Young Folks' Speaker.-Compiled by Mrs. J. W. Shoemaker. Philadelphia, Publication Department National School of Oratory.
- Dialogues.-Designed for school and social entertainment, entirely new and original. Edited by Mrs. J. W. Shoemaker. Philadelphia, National School of Elocution and Oratory.
