= Gladys Hall =

American journalist (1891–1977)

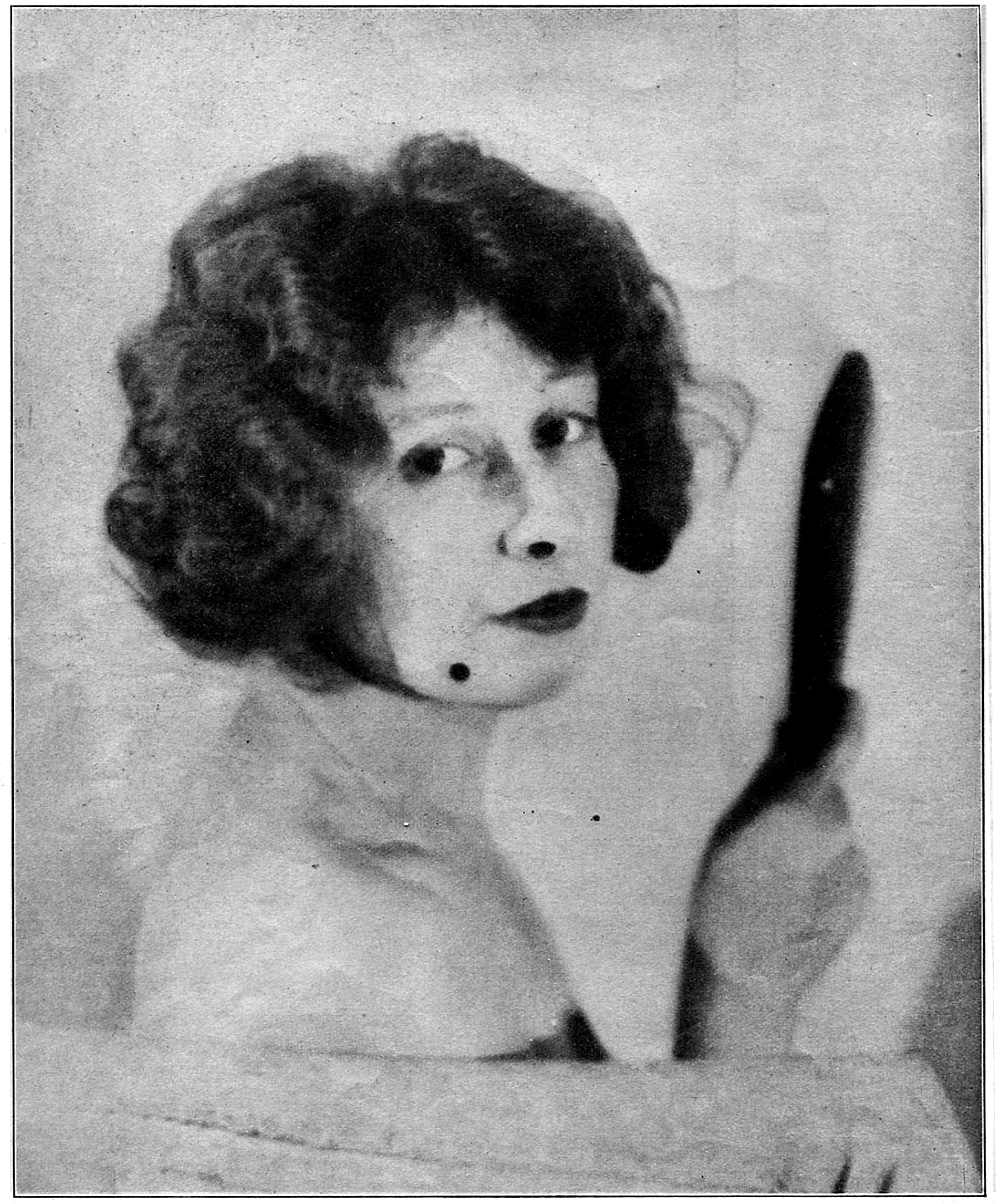
- 1923 photo from Screenland magazine
- Born: April 26, 1891; New York, New York, U.S.
- Died: September 18, 1977 (aged 86); Huntington, New York, U.S.
- Resting place: West Laurel Hill Cemetery, Bala Cynwyd, Pennsylvania, U.S.
- Occupation: Journalist
- Spouse: Russell Ball

Gladys Hall (April 26, 1891 - September 18, 1977) was an American journalist for several movie fan magazines including Modern Screen, Motion Picture Story Magazine, Photoplay, Screenland, and Shadowland. She wrote hundreds of photoplay editions, interviewed many of the stars of the silent film era, and was known as "The Grand Old Dame of the Fannies."

== Early life and education ==
Hall was born April 26, 1891, in New York City. She attended St. Gabriel's School for Girls in Peekskill, New York. She married photographer Russell Ball on February 1, 1912, when she was twenty years old.

== Career ==
She began writing short stories and poetry and was published in Cavalier, Munsey's Magazine, and The Smart Set. In 1913, her poem Fetterless was published in Motion Picture Story Magazine, the first movie fan magazine, and she soon became a regular contributor and an associate editor.

She wrote hundreds of photoplay editions, movie plot lines that were serialized into short stories. She published an average of six articles a month and became known as "The Grand Old Dame of the Fannies." She was editor for the magazine's column on "Public Opinions of Popular Plays and Players".

She became known for her interviews with film celebrities. She was a sympathetic interviewer and avoided writing about any scandal or controversy surrounding her subject. She was quoted as saying, "The public don't want their stars torn down, they want to believe in them, like Santa Claus."

Her first interview was with actor James Cruze in 1913. She went on to publish multiple interviews in the 1920s with stars of the silent film era including Charles Chaplin, Colleen Moore, Mary Pickford, Wallace Reid, Gloria Swanson, and Rudolph Valentino. These interviews were published in fan magazines including Photoplay, Modern Screen, Screenland, and Shadowland. Most of her articles were published under her name, but she also published under the pen names Faith Service, Janet Reid, and Russell E. Smith.

She wrote a syndicated column, "The Diary of a Professional Movie Fan," in the 1920s.

In 1927, she moved with her family to the Benedict Canyon neighborhood of Los Angeles, California. This allowed her greater access to the film industry and stars. She continued to write freelance for several fan and women's magazines and was active in the Hollywood Women's Press Club. By 1939, she was the highest paid fan magazine writer, making approximately $10,000 a year. After the death of her husband in 1942, she moved to Huntington, New York, and continued to write for fan magazines.

== Death and legacy ==
She died September 18, 1977, at her home in Huntington, New York, and was interred at West Laurel Hill Cemetery in Bala Cynwyd, Pennsylvania.

Her papers are held at the Margaret Herrick Library of the Academy of Motion Picture Arts and Sciences.
