= George H. Stockman =

American soldier during Civil War

First Lieutenant George Henry Stockman
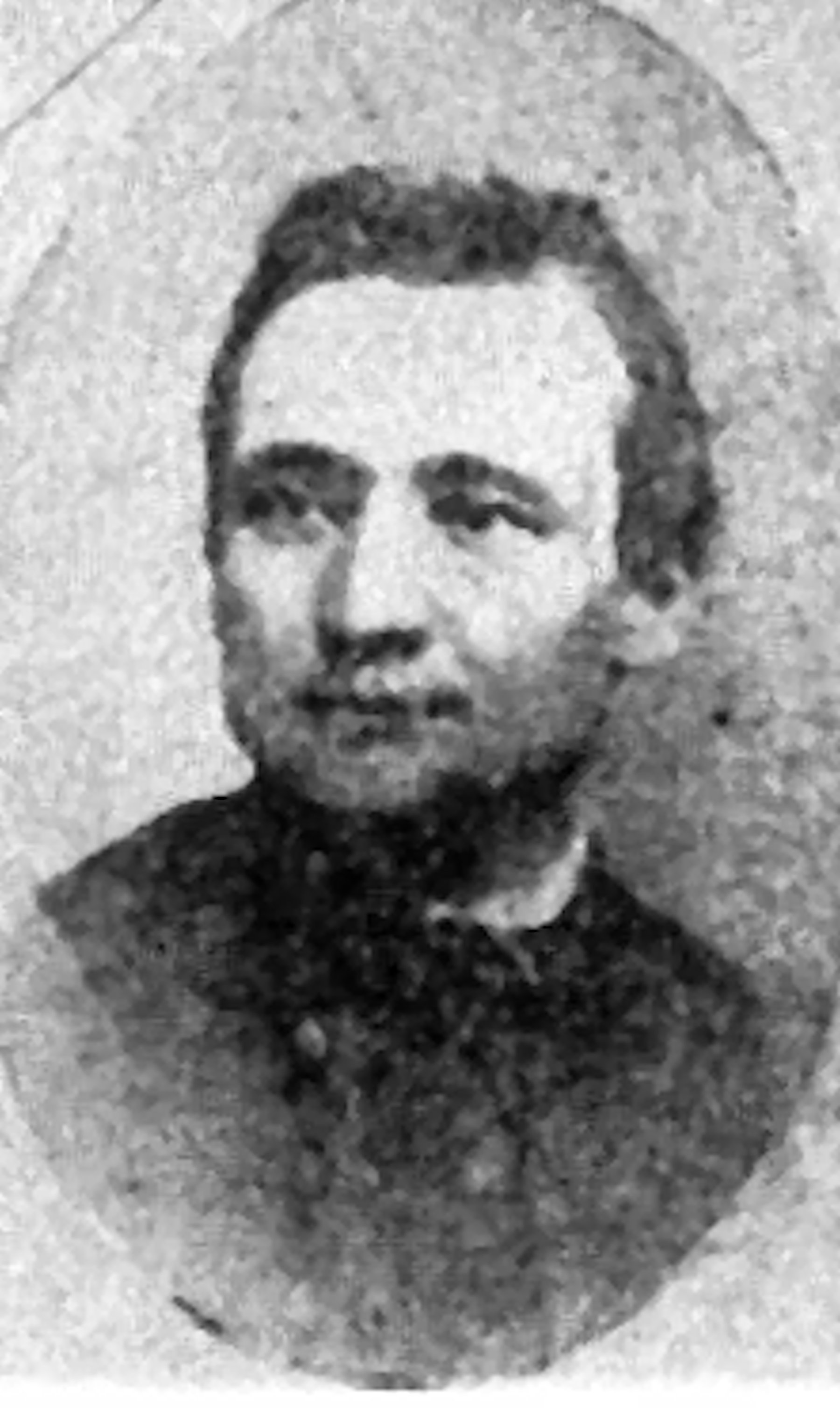
- Born: 3 July 1833; Muenden, Germany
- Died: 30 June 1912 (aged 78)
- Burial place: West Laurel Hill Cemetery, Bala-Cynwyd, Pennsylvania
- Military career
- Allegiance: United States (Union)
- Branch: Army
- Service years: 1861-1864
- Rank: First Lieutenant
- Units: Company C, 6th Missouri Infantry
- Conflicts: Siege of Vicksburg
- Awards: Medal of Honor

George Henry Stockman (3 July 1833 - 30 June 1912) was a first lieutenant in the United States Army who was awarded the Medal of Honor for gallantry during the American Civil War. He was awarded the medal on 9 July 1894 for actions performed at the Siege of Vicksburg on 22 May 1863.

== Personal life ==
Stockman was born in Muenden, Germany on 3 July 1833. He died on 30 June 1912 and was buried in West Laurel Hill Cemetery in Bala-Cynwyd, Pennsylvania.

== Military service ==
Stockman enlisted in the Army as a first lieutenant on 1 June 1861 in Chicago, Illinois and was assigned to G Company of the 6th Missouri Infantry. During the course of his enlistment, he was transferred to Company C of the same unit. On 22 May 1863, at the Siege of Vicksburg in Mississippi, Stockman volunteered to participate in an extremely dangerous charge on Confederate positions to the south of Vicksburg. Along with 150 other volunteers, whose job was to build a bridge over a ditch dug by the Confederates, Stockman held his ground under heavy gun and cannon fire from morning until nightfall in circumstances where 85 percent of the men were killed or seriously wounded.

Stockman's Medal of Honor citation reads:

The President of the United States of America, in the name of Congress, takes pleasure in presenting the Medal of Honor to First Lieutenant (Infantry) George Henry Stockman, United States Army, for gallantry in the charge of the volunteer storming party on 22 May 1863, while serving with Company C, 6th Missouri Infantry, in action at Vicksburg, Mississippi.

— D. S. Lamont, Secretary of War

Stockman was honorably discharged from the Army on 7 June 1864.
