= L. Lewis Sagendorph =

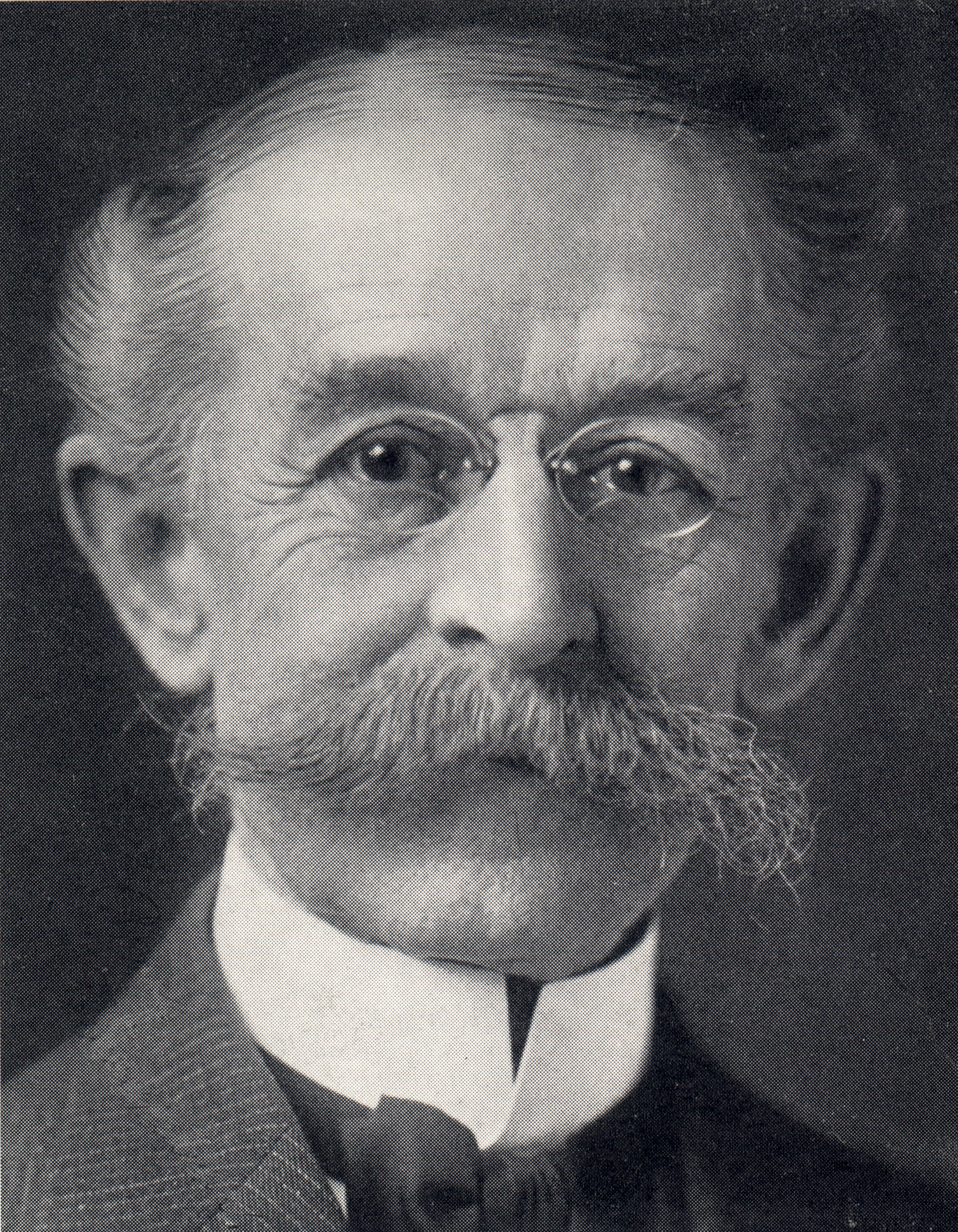
- Born: September 26, 1842; Hudson, New York, US
- Died: April 13, 1909 (aged 66); Philadelphia, Pennsylvania, US
- Occupations: Inventor, industrialist, businessman

L. Lewis Sagendorph (September 26, 1842 – April 13, 1909) was an American inventor and leading manufacturer of sheet metal products in the late 19th and very early 20th centuries. He founded what later became the Penn Metal Company in Philadelphia, Pennsylvania.

== Life and career ==
Longley Lewis Sagendorph, Jr. was born in Hudson, New York and later moved to Rhode Island where he served in the Civil War with Company K of the 10th Rhode Island Infantry Regiment. After the war he moved to Staunton, Virginia and in 1869 started his manufacturing enterprise.

Sagendorph moved his company to Cincinnati, Ohio in 1879 and founded the Sagendorph Iron Roofing and Corrugating Company in partnership with Major Harlan P. Lloyd. The new company manufactured an array of sheet steel products.

In 1889 he sold the company and moved to Philadelphia and started the Penn Metal Ceiling & Roofing Company. Penn Metal began manufacturing corrugated iron and steel roofing, galvanized conductor pipe, pressed metal ceilings, heavy duty steel lockers, cabinets, shelving and corrugated metal pipe.

Sagendorph was an inventor as well as a manufacturer. From 1879 to 1905 he secured more than 100 U.S. and foreign patents for sheet metal manufacturing machinery such as roller dies, the sleeve die, automatic feeding mechanisms for press work, power squaring shears, toggle presses, machines for shearing and punching sheet steel, and the original method of corrugating sheets by means of rolls.

At his death he was president of The Penn Metal Ceiling & Roofing Company of Philadelphia, The New York Iron Roofing & Corrugating Company of Jersey City, New Jersey, The American Metal Stamping Company and the Enameled Art Metal Company in Germantown, Pennsylvania.

After Sagendorph's death, in Philadelphia in 1909, his two eldest sons, George Adam Sagendorph and Frank Elijah Sagendorph 2nd continued to operate the company. In later years the two brothers divided the company and changed the name to the Penn Metal Company, Inc., (Boston and Parkersburg, West Virginia) and the Penn Metal Corporation of Penna (Philadelphia, Pennsylvania), which later also incorporated the trade name Penco.

== Bibliography ==
- Parkersburg, W. Va (1944). Seventy-fifth Penn Metal year, 1869-1944. Penn Metal Co. OCLC 20034058.
- Sagendorph, Longley Lewis (1902). Metal sectional ceilings and side wall decorations. Philadelphia: McLaughlin Bros. OCLC 83479125.
- Sagendorph, Longley Lewis (1904). The Penn Metal Ceiling & Roofing Company Limited...metal sectional ceilings and side wall decorations : suitable for churches, amusement halls, hospitals, asylums, school buildings, theatres, stores and dwellings of all classes. Philadelphia: Penn Metal Ceiling and Roofing Company, Ltd. OCLC 83479125.
- History of the Ninth and Tenth Regiments Rhode Island Volunteers and the Tenth Rhode Island Battery in the Union Army in 1862 by William Allen Spicer. Providence: Snow & Farnham, Printers, 1892. Sagendorfer is listed on page 409.
