= Rachel H. Shoemaker =

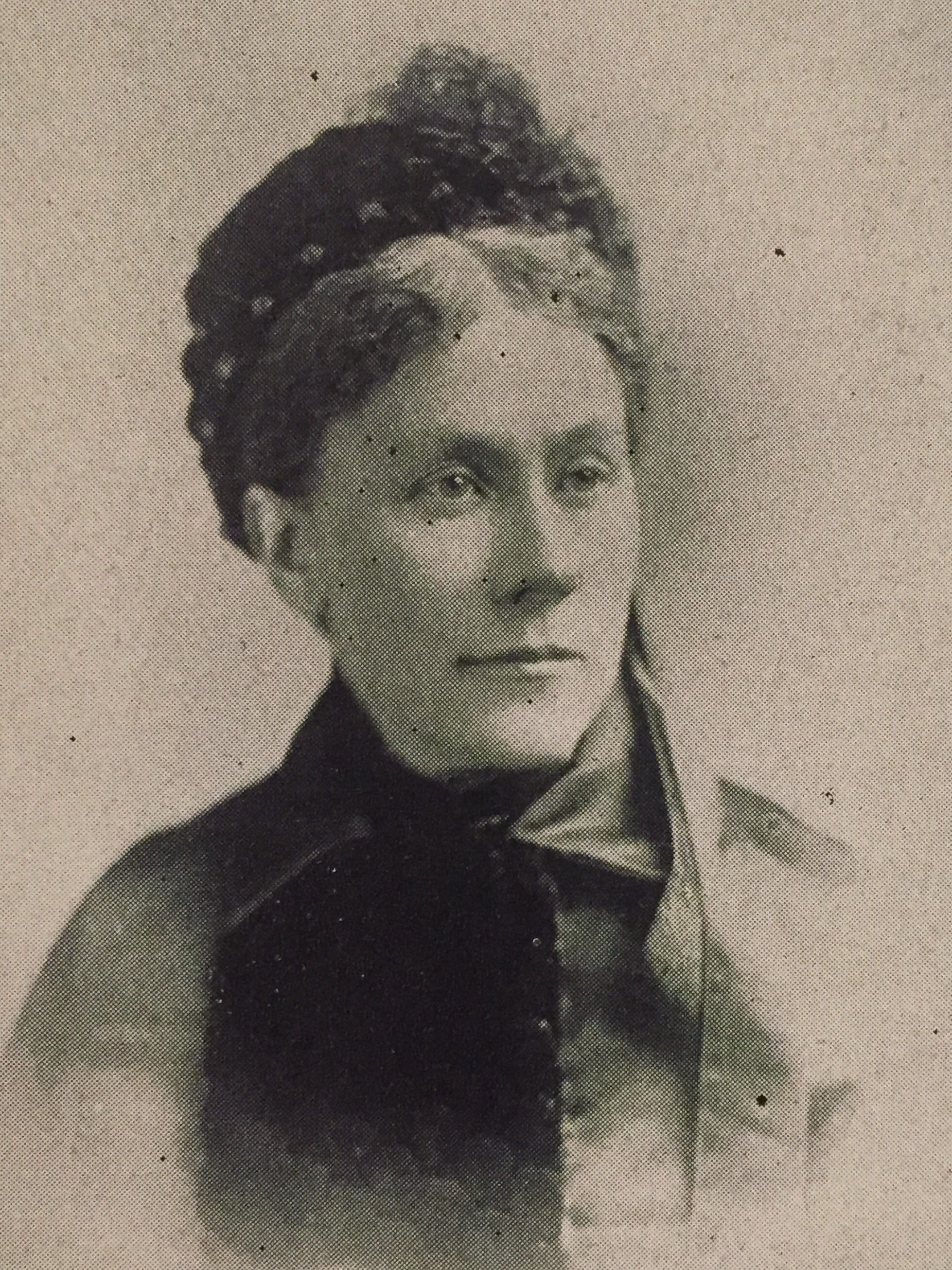
"A Woman of the Century"

Rachel Walter Hinkle Shoemaker (née, Hinkle; October 1, 1838 - February 1, 1915) was a dramatic elocutionist and Shakespearean reciter.

== Early life ==
Rachel (nickname, "Rachie") Walter Hinkle was born near Doylestown, Pennsylvania, on October 1, 1838. One of her ancestors on her father's side, William Hinkle, came to the U.S. with William Penn, with whom he was closely associated in the affairs of the colony of Pennsylvania. On her mother's side, Elizabeth Walter, her ancestors were Hollanders. Rachel Hinkle descended from Edward Marshall of Tinicum Township, Bucks County, Pennsylvania, one of the participants in the Walking Purchase of 1737. Her parents were farmers. Rachel lived on the homestead farm until she was twenty years old. She was the youngest of five children.

In childhood, she displayed a talent and liking for recitation. Her early education was such as the public schools gave in those days, and later, she attended the State Normal School in Millersville, Pennsylvania, where, after graduation, she remained as a teacher of English and French.

== Career ==
Rachel Shoemaker always maintained a connection in some capacity with National School of Elocution and Oratory, the school founded with her husband. She acted as president when no one else was chosen. She compiled a number of books for elocutionists, and she studied and wrote much upon the subject. She taught thousands of students and read in many cities, including Philadelphia, New York City, Cincinnati, Minneapolis, Toronto, Hamilton and Montreal. The school founded by herself and her husband prospered from the beginning and trained some of the most successful readers of the day.

== Personal life ==
On June 27, 1867, Rachel Walter Hinkle married Professor Jacob W. Shoemaker (1842-1880). They made their home in Philadelphia, where, in 1875, they opened the National School of Elocution and Oratory, and later commenced the publication of elocutionary books. Prof. Shoemaker died in 1880, leaving his wife with two young children, a son and a daughter: Frank Willard (1871–1956) and Dora Adele (1873–1962).

Dora became President of the National School of Elocution and Oratory, but she closed the school at the beginning of World War II. After that she became a playwright and poet. She continued to teach adult night classes at St. Johns Roman Catholic Church.

Rachel Walter Hinkle Shoemaker died in Philadelphia on February 1, 1915, and is buried at West Laurel Hill Cemetery, Bala Cynwyd.
