= Moses Veale =

American soldier (1832–1917)

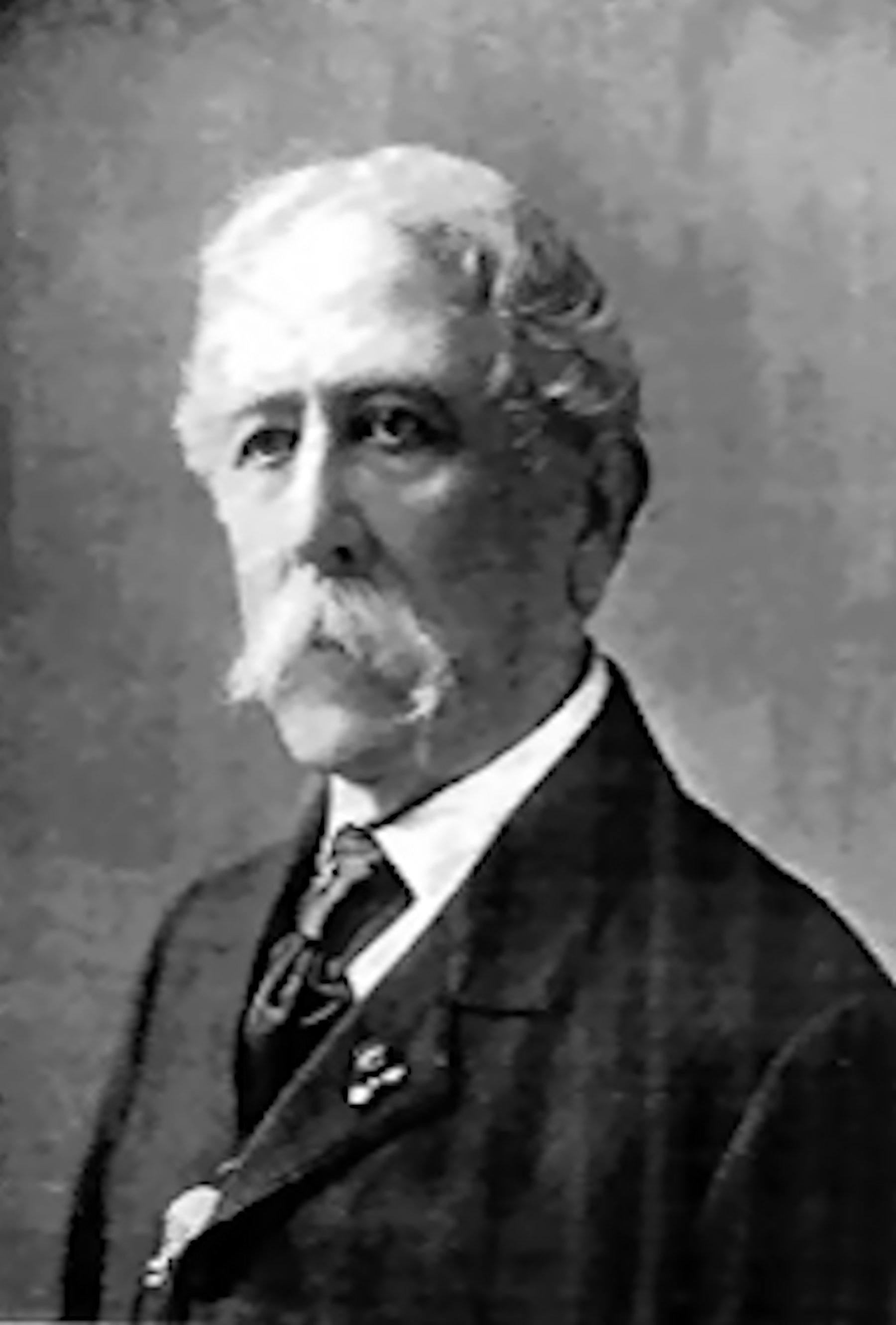
- Born: November 9, 1832; Bridgeton, New Jersey
- Died: July 27, 1917 (aged 84)
- Buried: West Laurel Hill Cemetery, Pennsylvania
- Conflicts: Battle of Gettysburg Battle of Chancellorsville Battle of Antietam
- Other work: United States attorney for the territory of Montana, Clerk of Indian Affairs, Health Officer of Philadelphia

Moses Veale (November 9, 1832 – July 27, 1917) was an American soldier, attorney and Medal of Honor recipient. After being awarded the Medal of Honor for actions at Wauhatchie, Tennessee, during the American Civil War he served as the United States attorney for the territory of Montana. He served multiple positions through the years and was nominated for State Senator of Pennsylvania in 1876.

== Civil War ==
Veale joined the 109th Pennsylvania Infantry as a second lieutenant on November 8, 1861. He was assistant provost marshal on the staff of General Christopher C. Augur and assistant commissary Musters and aide-de-campe for General John W. Geary. He had achieved the rank of captain by the date of his Medal of Honor action, receiving the commission on April 4, 1863. The Medal of Honor was awarded January 17, 1897, for gallantry in action on October 28, 1863. The Citation reads - 'Gallantry in action; manifesting throughout the engagement coolness, zeal, judgment, and courage. His horse was shot from under him and he was hit by four enemy bullets.'

Veale fought in numerous battles such as Antietam, Gettysburg, Battle of Cedar Mountain. Following the Battle of Cedar Mountain, Veale was captured and held in Libby Prison until he was exchanged on September 30, 1862. He was discharged as a major on June 8, 1865. Prior to his discharge he received a brevet rank of colonel on January 16, 1865.

== Later life ==
Following the war he stayed some time in Montana, first as the United States attorney for the territory of Montana then as clerk of Indian affairs and finally was appointed adjutant general of Montana with a rank of brigadier on January 8, 1868.

Upon his return to Philadelphia in 1876, the Democratic party nominated him for state senator of the fifth senatorial district. In 1881 the city of Philadelphia nominated him for recorder of deeds. On April 15, 1884, Governor Pattison made Veale the health officer of Philadelphia.

== Death ==
Veale died on July 27, 1917, in Philadelphia, Pennsylvania, and was then interred in West Laurel Hill Cemetery.
