= Edward Taylor Snow =

American painter and art collector

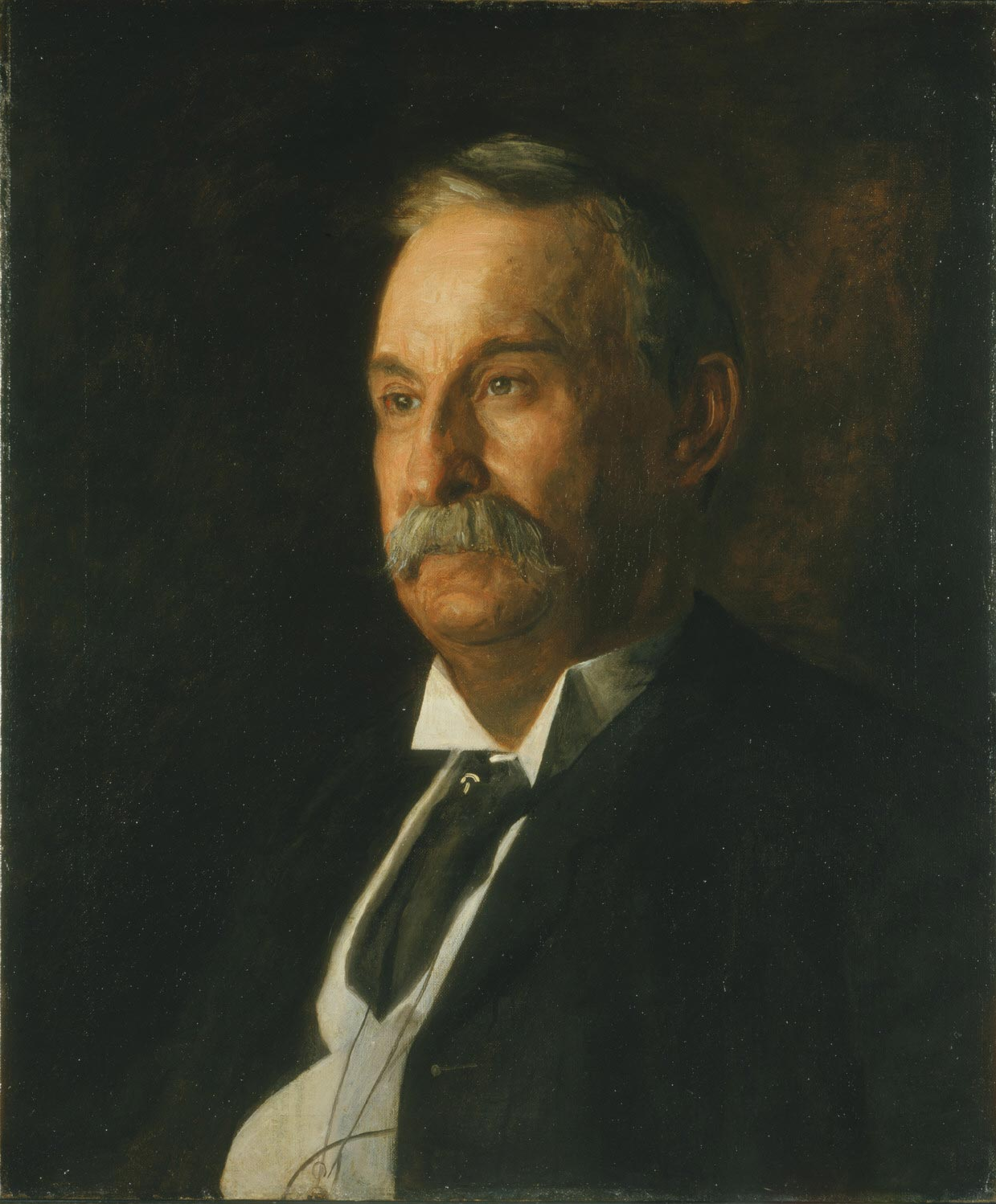
Portrait of Edward Taylor Snow

Edward Taylor Snow (March 13, 1844 – September 26, 1913) was a notable American landscape painter and art collector based in Philadelphia, Pennsylvania.

== Early life and education ==
He was born in Philadelphia, the son of Edward Knight Snow and Mary Anne Snow. He studied at the Philadelphia Academy of Fine Arts in the 1860s under Christian Schussele. He also studied in Paris, Amsterdam and Berlin.

== Career ==
He was the Art Commissioner at the Tennessee Centennial and International Exposition, the Trans-Mississippi Exposition, and a juror at the South Carolina Inter-State and West Indian Exposition.

He was a member of the Art Club of Philadelphia, and his documents are held by the Historical Society of Pennsylvania, the Archives of American Art, and the National Portrait Gallery Library among other places.

He was a contemporary of Thomas Eakins, and the Eakins' 1904 portrait of Snow is held by the Philadelphia Museum of Art.

== Family life ==
He married Belle Osborne (1845-1914) and had several children, including Edward Osborne Snow and Emma Elliot Harmstadt. He died at his home in Philadelphia on September 26, 1913, and is buried in the West Laurel Hill Cemetery.
