= Vera Huckel =

American mathematician and aerospace engineer (1908-1999)

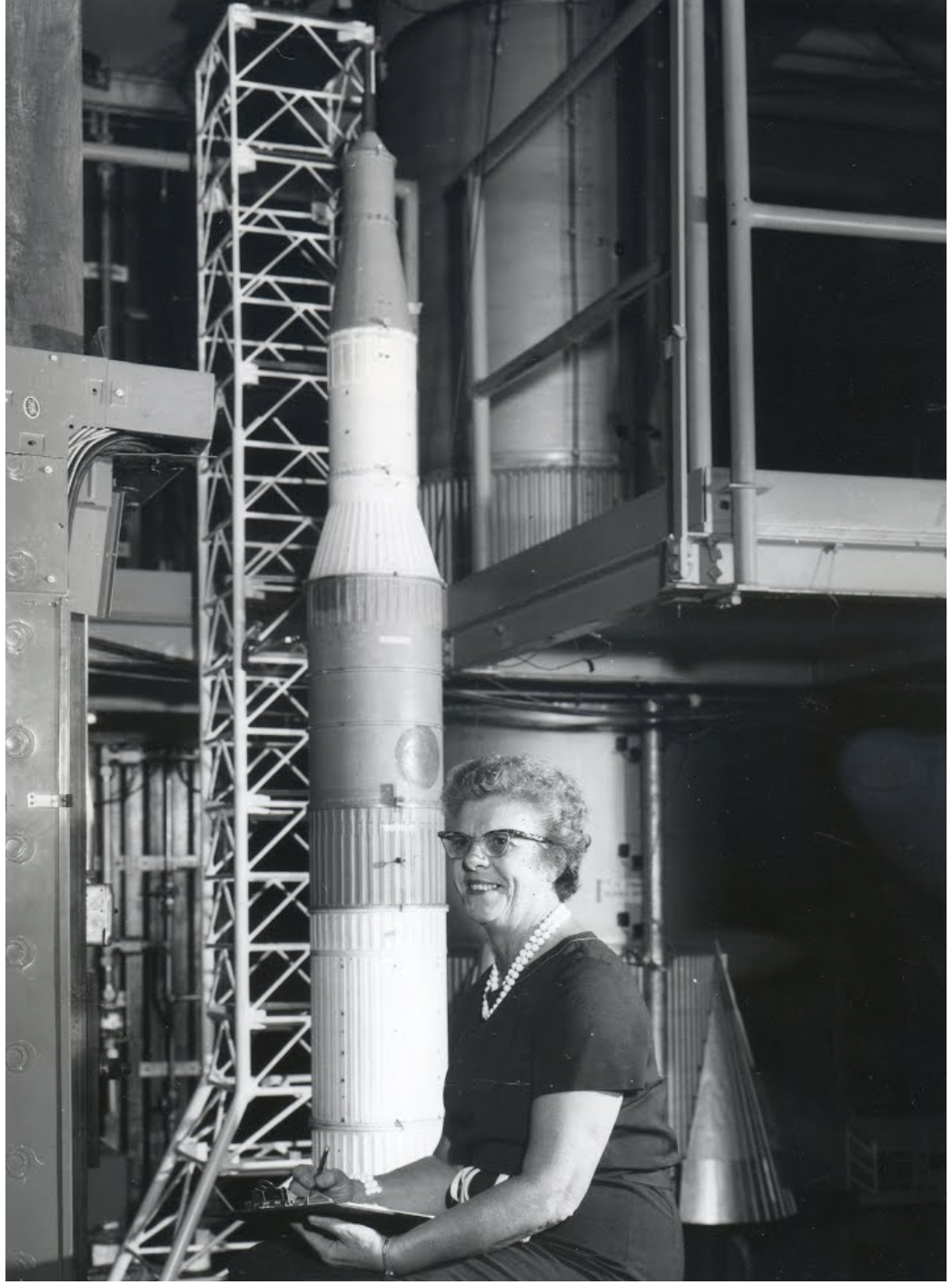
- Vera Huckel, 1966
- Born: May 10, 1908
- Died: March 24, 1999 (aged 90); Newport News, Virginia, U.S.
- Resting place: West Laurel Hill Cemetery, Bala Cynwyd, Pennsylvania, U.S.
- Occupations: Computer; Aerospace engineer Mathematician
- Employer(s): National Advisory Committee for Aeronautics; National Aeronautics and Space Administration

Vera Huckel (May 10, 1908 – March 24, 1999) was an American mathematician and aerospace engineer. She was one of the first female computers and engineers at the National Advisory Committee for Aeronautics (NACA), now known as NASA. She worked at the Langley Aeronautical Laboratory and conducted research on sonic booms created by supersonic flight. She was involved in the transition away from human computers and wrote the program for the first electronic computer used at NACA.

== Biography ==
Huckel was born in 1908. She studied math at the University of Pennsylvania and graduated in 1929. After living in California for ten years, she was hired as a computer at the Langley Aeronautical Laboratory in Hampton, Virginia. She had filled out an application for the role only because she had driven friends to Langley to be interviewed as computers. Before the invention of electronic computers, these human computers, who were mostly women, would do the time-consuming calculations necessary for successful flights. She was one of three female engineers at the NACA Memorial Langley Aeronautical Laboratory.

Computers had to take the civil service examination and most had at least a bachelor's degree. In the 1940s, computers were classified as "sub-professional" in which a junior computer could make $1,400 a year and a chief computer $3,200 a year. Many of the men with similar qualifications were hired as junior engineers which paid $2,600 a year. Despite the sub-professional status, the role paid much better than most jobs available to women at the time.

She also worked as a supervisory mathematician and aerospace engineer during her time at NACA/NASA. By 1945 she had been promoted to section head in charge of up to 17 other women.

She helped NACA make the switch from hand calculations to electronic computers. She wrote the program for the first electronic computer used by NACA. She also worked on theories of aerodynamics. As a mathematician, she was involved in the testing of sonic booms in supersonic flight. She would travel to the test sites in the western United States to calculate the mathematics of the test flights. If she was unable to travel, the data was sent to her in Virginia as she was the only person trusted to perform the calculations.

Huckel retired from NASA in 1972 after working there for more than 33 years.

She was active in the Soroptomist Organization, the American Association of University Women, and volunteered with the Hampton United Way.

Huckel died at 90 years of age on March 24, 1999, in Newport News, Virginia, where she had lived for more than 60 years. She was buried in West Laurel Hill Cemetery in Bala Cynwyd, Pennsylvania.

== Publications ==
- Morgan, Homer G., Harry L. Runyan, and Vera Huckel. "Theoretical considerations of flutter at high Mach numbers." Journal of the Aerospace Sciences 25, no. 6 (1958): 371–381.
- Morgan, Homer G., Vera Huckel, and Harry L. Runyan. Procedure for calculating flutter at high supersonic speed including camber deflections, and comparison with experimental results. No. NACA-TN-4335. 1958.
- Hilton, David Artland, Vera Huckel, Domenic J. Maglieri, and R. Steiner. Sonic-boom exposures during FAA community response studies over a 6-month period in the Oklahoma City area. No. NASA-TN-D-2539. 1964.
- Hilton, David A., Vera Huckel, and Domenic J. Maglieri. Sonic-boom measurements during bomber training operations in the Chicago area. NASA-TN D3655 National Aeronautics and Space Administration, 1966.
- Henderson, Herbert, Vera Huckel, and Domenic J. Maglieri. Variability in Sonic Boom Signatures Measured Along an 8000-foot Linear Array. NASA-TN D5040 National Aeronautics and Space Administration, 1969.
