= Shibah =

Shibah may refer to:

- Shibah or Shib'a, a well dug by Isaac in the locality which developed as Beersheba in Israel
- Shiva, the week-long period of mourning in Judaism
