= Honorifics for the dead in Judaism =

Jewish phrases to honor the dead

Among the honorifics in Judaism, there are several traditional honorifics for the dead which are used when naming and speaking of the deceased. Different honorifics may be applied depending on the deceased's particular status. These honorifics are frequently found on gravestones, on memorial walls inside the sanctuary of synagogues, in speeches, and in writing, such as in obituaries.

In writing, it is most common to use the name followed by an abbreviation of an honorific, either in Hebrew or English. For examples, see the chart. Hebrew abbreviations use a special punctuation mark called the gershayim (״).

== Comparison chart ==
The following chart shows different honorifics used, along with their abbreviation in Hebrew and English, their translation, the masculine and feminine forms, the type of person which the honorific is applied to, and examples.

English abbreviation	Hebrew abbreviation	Full phrase in Hebrew		English translation	For whom used	Example
English abbreviation	Hebrew abbreviation	For a man	For a woman	English translation	For whom used	Example
Z"L	ז״ל	זכרונו לברכה zikhrono livrakha	זכרונה לברכה zikhronah livrakha	of blessed memory; or may his/her memory be a blessing	a holy or a righteous person	Israel Israeli Z״L or Israel Israeli ז״ל or Rabbi Israel Israeli Z"L or Rabbi Israel Israeli ז״ל
A"H	ע״ה	עליו השלום alav ha-shalom	עליה השלום aleha ha-shalom	may peace be upon him/her	non-rabbinical or biblical figure	Albert Peretz A"H or Albert Peretz ע״ה or Avraham Avinu A"H or Avraham Avinu ע"ה
ZT"L or ZTz"L	זצ״ל	זכר צדיק לברכה zekher tzadik livrakha		may the memory of the righteous be a blessing	a holy or a righteous person	Maran Ovadia Yosef ZT"L or Maran Ovadia Yosef ZTz"L or Maran Ovadia Yosef זצ״ל
ZK"L	זק״ל	זכר קדוש לברכה zekher kadosh livrakha		may the memory of the holy be a blessing	a holy person, not necessarily a martyr	Judah Halevi ZK"L or Judah Halevi זק״ל
ZTVK"L	זצוק״ל	זכר צדיק וקדוש לברכה zekher tzaddik v'kadosh livrakha		may the memory of the righteous and holy be a blessing	a righteous and holy person, not necessarily a martyr	Rabbi Avraham Yitzchak Bloch ZTVK"L or Rabbi Avraham Yitzchak Bloch זצוק״ל
ZTzVKLLH"H	זצוקללה״ה	זכר צדיק וקדוש לברכה לחיי העולם הבא zekher tzaddik v'kadosh livrakha, l'chayei ha'olam ha-ba		may the memory of the righteous and holy be a blessing for the life of the world to come	an outstandingly holy person	Rabbenu Tzadok Hacohen (may the memory of the righteous and holy be a blessing for the life of the world to come) or Rabbenu Tzadok Hacohen זצוקללה״ה
ZY"A	זי"ע	זכותו יגן עלינו zechuto yagen aleinu		may his merit shield us	an outstandingly holy person	Rabbi Menachem Mendel Shneersohn ZY"A or Rabbi Menachem Mendel Shneersohn זי"ע
HY"D	הי״ד	השם יקום דמו; Hashem yikkom damo	השם יקום דמה; Hashem yikkom dama	may Hashem avenge his / her blood	martyred Jews or Jews killed by antisemites	Hana "Hanička" Bradyová HY"D or Hana "Hanička" Bradyová הי״ד
HK"M	הכ״מ	הריני כפרת משכבו Hareini Kaparot Mishkavo	הריני כפרת משכבה Hareini Kaparot Mishkava	may I be an atonement for his/her resting	a parent who has passed within a year	Jacob Golberg HK"M or Jacob Golberg הכ״מ

== General honorifics ==
Some honorifics may be used for any individual. These honorifics are generally not used for rabbis or other special persons, since the specific honorifics for those people are used instead, as a sign of honor and respect. See below.

=== May he rest in peace ===
The single most common funerary salutation in Jewish inscriptions from Rome in the 3rd and 4th centuries is ἐν εἰρήνῃ ἡ κοιμήσις αὐτοῦ/αὐτῆς/σοῦ 'May he/she/you rest in peace'. Joseph S. Park argues that it is distinctively Jewish, relating to the Jewish concept of death-as-sleep, although it also appears in a period Christian inscription. It is equivalent to Hebrew י/תנוח בשלום and משכבו בשלום (compare Isaiah 57:2), found on 3-6th century Jewish tombstones from Zoara, in modern-day Jordan. Park argues that שלום by itself is also intended as the equivalent, but that שלום על משכבו means instead 'May his tomb be left in peace'. Also popular was משכבו בכבוד 'May he rest in glory' and the equivalent מנוחתו כבוד (Isaiah 11:10), shortened to מו״כ, was particularly common in the Rishonic period. The Tzidduq hadDin concludes ינוח נפשו בשלום / ישכב בשלום וישן בשלום / עד יבא מנחם משמיע שלום, 'May he rest in peace / lie in peace and sleep in peace / until the Comforter announces peace'.

=== Of blessed memory ===
The most common honorific is of blessed memory or may his/her memory be a blessing. The Hebrew transliteration is zikhrono livrakha (m.) / zikhronah livrakha (f.) (Hebrew: זיכרונה לברכה (f.) / זיכרונו לברכה (m.)). It is often abbreviated in English both as OBM and as Z"L. The Hebrew abbreviation is ז״ל.

In the past, it was common to use this expression for living people as well. In the Babylonian Talmud, it is mentioned that a person should say this expression about his dead father, in addition to the phrase "[May] I be the atonement of his resting-place."

=== Peace be upon him/her ===
An alternative honorific is Peace be upon him/her. The Hebrew version is alav ha-shalom (m.) / aleha ha-shalom (f.) (Hebrew: עליו השלום (m.) / עליה השלום (f.)). It is abbreviated in English as A"H. The Hebrew abbreviation is ע״ה.

This phrase is the same as the Islamic honorific peace be upon him (which is used for all prophets of Islam). However, unlike in Islamic usage, the English abbreviation PBUH is not commonly used for the Jewish honorific.

The above two may be used interchangeably; however of blessed memory is the most common.

The term עליו השלום did not appear in Hebrew literature until the early Rishonic period, a century after its introduction in Judeo-Arabic. According to the theory of Michael Broyde, after the Arab conquest the Arabic phrase عَلَيْهِ ٱلسَّلَامُ ("peace be upon him") was translated to Hebrew עליו השלום and was used for any deceased person, a usage which spread to the Jews of Christian Europe beginning in the 12th century. The phrase is more common in Islamic literature as an honorific for saints, and over time in Hebrew it came to predominate over עבד השם (the classical Hebrew honorific for biblical figures), and by 1600 usage of עבד השם had disappeared, leaving עליו השלום (or its feminine/plural forms) as the only expansion of ע"ה.

=== May HaShem avenge his/her blood ===
The honorific May HaShem avenge his/her blood is generally used for an individual who has been murdered through martyrdom or other acts of antisemitism such as the Holocaust, pogroms, genocide, or terrorist attacks. During the Gaza war and genocide the term was used for some sects of Jewish IDF soldiers who had been killed in combat. In 2024 the IDF gave approval for it to be used on IDF military headstones at the request of the family. The Hebrew phrase is HaShem yikom damo (m.) / HaShem yikom dama (f.) / HaShem yikom damam (pl.) (Hebrew: השם יקום דמו (m.) / השם יקום דמה (f.) / השם יקום דמם (pl.)). The English abbreviation is HY"D, the Hebrew abbreviation הי״ד.

=== May I be an atonement for his/her resting ===
An appropriate honorific within the first year after one’s parent passes is May I be an atonement for his/her resting. The Hebrew transliteration is Hareini Kaparot Mishkavo (Hebrew: הריני כפרת משכבו)(m.)/Hareini Kaparot Mishkava (Hebrew: הריני כפרת משכבה)(f.) It is abbreviated as HK”M/ הכ״מ in Hebrew. This is used particularly when making a statement attributable to the deceased. Many authorities say it should be used whenever mentioning the deceased.

== Other ==
Other expressions used to add to the names of people who died: "the deceased", "rest of Eden", "rest in peace". It is customary to sign the tombstones with the initials תַּנְצְבָ"ה (תְּהִי נִשְׁמָתוֹ צְרוּרָה בִּצְרוֹר הַחַיִּים (according to the language of the verse: May his soul be bound in the bond of life.).

=== Holy and the righteous ===
The abbreviation זי״ע zy״a stands for zekhuto yagen ʿalenu "May his merit shield us", and often follows the mention of meritorious righteous ones. A variant is זיע״א zya״a, which adds amen at the end. This expression stems from the belief that a righteous person who passes to the next world can serve as an advocate before God for his remaining community. Other acronyms of this type are נבג״מ (נשמתו בגנזי מרומים "his soul in the heavenly vineyards") and נלב״ע (נפטר לבית עולמו "died to his world").

=== Memory of the righteous ===
The honorific "May the memory of the righteous be a blessing" is used after the names of holy rabbis and other saints people, and "the name of the wicked shall perish" on a wicked person. both from Proverbs 10:7.

In Hebrew transliteration: "zekher tzadik livrakha" and in Hebrew: "זכר צדיק לברכה". The English abbreviation commonly used is "ZT"L" and in Hebrew, "זצ״ל" is used. It is pronounced in reading as "zatzal". It may be also written as "ZTz"L".

It is used primarily in reference to rabbis who have been deceased in recent memory. Thus, one is likely to write "Rabbi Moshe Feinstein ZT"L" (d. 1986) but far less likely to write "Rashi ZT"L" (d. 1105). This expression is synonymous with Z"L (see above) in that Z"L inherently implies the person was righteous, but, in modern Hasidic communities, where tzadik has acquired a different meaning, ZT"L may be used to distinguish the tzadik in that modern sense.

In the course of time, additional versions of the above expressions were created, for example: "זכר צדיק וקדוש לברכה"; "may the memory of the righteous and holy be a blessing" (ZTVK"L; זצוק״ל), or "זכר צדיק וקדוש לברכה לחיי העולם הבא"; "may the memory of the righteous and holy be a blessing for the life of the world to come" (זצוקללה״ה).

=== Memory of the wicked ===
While the above-mentioned positive honorifics are added to the names of beloved people, the names of those considered to be particularly wicked (i.e. evil, despised, etc.) are sometimes embellished with the phrase "Yimakh shemo" ימח שמו, "May his name be blotted out". Another phrase is "Shem reshaim yirkav" שם רשעים ירקב, "the name of the wicked will rot".

== See also ==
- Bereavement in Judaism
- Honorifics in Judaism
- Chazal
