= Kria =

Kria may refer to:

- Kria, a place featured in The Hitchhiker's Guide to the Galaxy
- KRIA (FM), a radio station (103.9 FM) licensed to serve Plainview, Texas, United States
- Keriah, the tearing of garments as part of bereavement in Judaism
