= Bereavement in Judaism =

Jewish mourning practices

Bereavement in Judaism (Hebrew: אֲבֵלוּת, romanized: ʾăvēlût, lit. 'mourning') is shaped and governed by a combination of Jewish custom (מִנְהָג, minhāg; pl. מִנְהָגִים, minhāgîm), observations of figures in the Hebrew Bible, and mitzvot (Biblical Hebrew: מִצְוֹת, romanized: miṣwôt, lit. 'commandments'; sing. מִצְוָה, miṣwāh) derived therefrom in Judaism's Rabbinic literature. Chazal—the rabbis and scholars whose discussions are recorded in the Mishnah, Talmud, and Tosefta—explicate mourning Halakha in, for example, Mo'ed Katan 14b–28b, Sotah 14a:4, Berakhot 6b, and Sanhedrin 46b. The details of observance and practice vary according to each Jewish community.

== Mourners ==
In Judaism, the principal mourners are the first-degree relatives: parent, child, sibling, and spouse. There are some customs that are specific to an individual mourning a parent. Religious laws concerning mourning do not apply to those under thirteen years of age, nor do they apply when the deceased individual is aged 30 days or less.

== Upon receiving news of the death ==
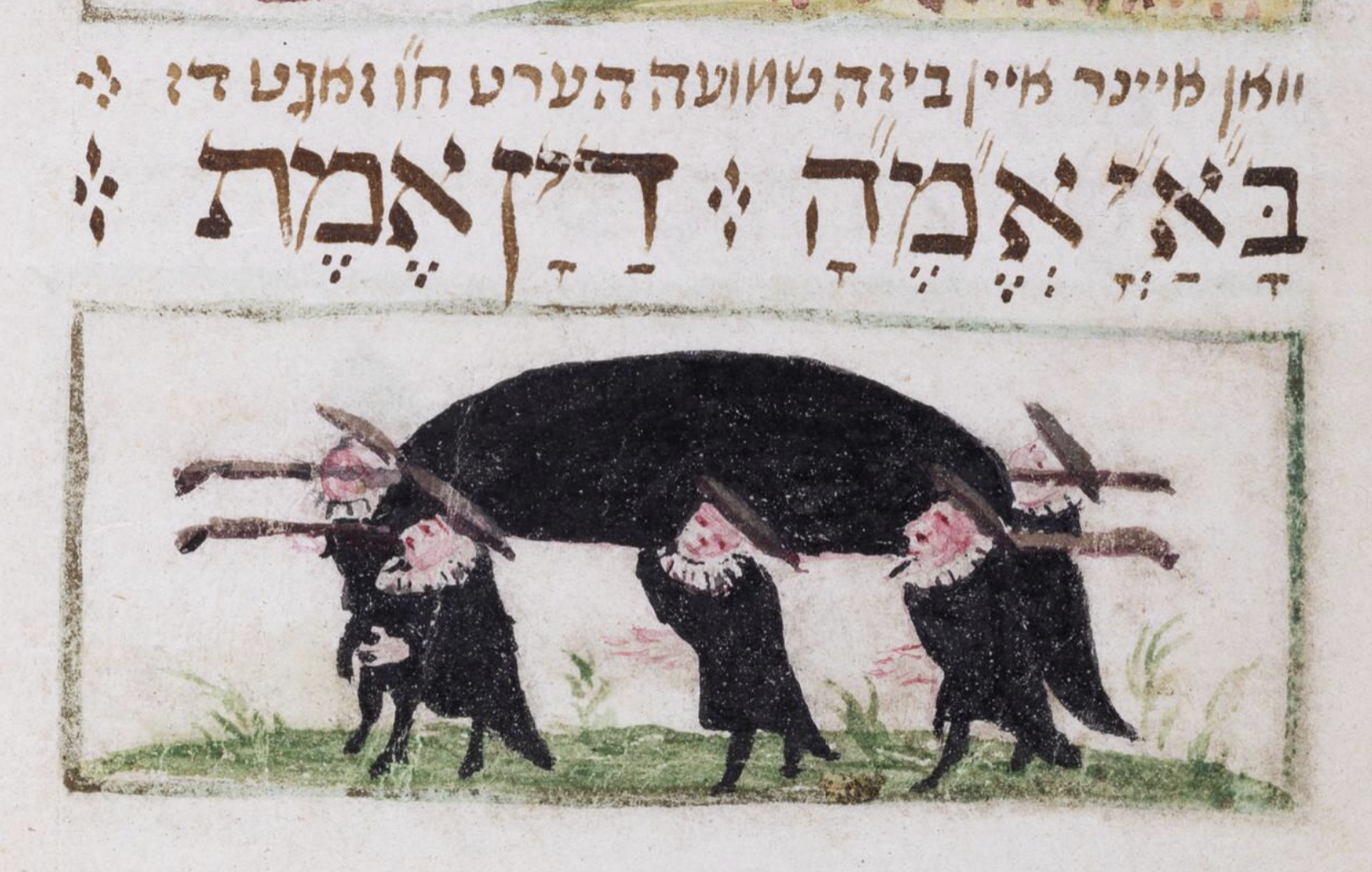
Baruch dayan emet in a 1727 siddur illustrated by Nathan ben Samson of Mezhyrich

Upon receiving the news of the death, the following blessing is recited:

בָּרוּךְ אַתָּה יהוה אֱלֹהֵינוּ מֶלֶךְ הָעוֹלָם, דַּיַּן הָאֱמֶת.

Bāruḵ ʾattā ʾadōnāy ʾelōhēnû, meleḵ hāʿolām, dayyan hāʾemet.

Blessed are you, YHWH, our God, king of the universe, the judge of truth.

In the Hebrew Bible, the mourning custom was to tear one's clothes the moment one heard the news of a death. The modern practice is for the close relatives who are the principal mourners to tear their clothing at the funeral.

== Terminology and timing ==
- Avel (pl. avelim) – mourner(s)
- Avelut – mourning, of which there are different levels based on who is mourned and the timing post-death:
  - Aninut – generally the day when the news is heard; before burial. A mourner in this period is known as an onen.
  - Shiva – seven days, from the Hebrew word shiva (שִׁבְעָה, 'seven'). Begins with the burial day.
  - Shloshim – 30 days, starting from the day of burial
  - Shneim asar chodesh – mourning period of twelve months for a deceased parent
- Chevra kadisha – burial society
- Hesped – eulogy
- Qaddish – said by a mourner or by someone on behalf of a mourner
- Qeriah – tearing; timing varies by custom. At times deferred to the funeral chapel or at the cemetery
- Qvura – burial
- Levaya – funeral service. The word means "escort(ing)."
- L'Illui Nishmat – Hebrew for elevation of the soul, sometimes abbreviated LI"N
- Matzevah – monument or tombstone. See also Unveiling of the tombstone.
- Petira – passing
- Shemira – watching or guarding of the body until burial, to ensure it is not left unaccompanied
- Tahara – purification (by water) of the body
- Yahrzeit – Yiddish for anniversary of the (Hebrew/Jewish) date of passing

== Chevra kadisha ==
The chevra kadisha (Hebrew: חברה קדישא "sacred society") is a Jewish burial society usually consisting of volunteers, men and women, who prepare the deceased for proper Jewish burial. Their job is to ensure that the body of the deceased is shown proper respect, ritually cleansed, and shrouded. Their work is traditionally understood as an expression of chesed shel emet (Hebrew: חֶסֶד שֶׁל אֱמֶת, "true kindness"), a term used in Jewish tradition to describe acts of kindness performed for the deceased, who cannot repay or acknowledge them. Classical rabbinic sources regard care for the dead as the purest form of gemilut chasadim (acts of loving-kindness), emphasizing the dignity (kavod hamet) owed to every person in death. As part of this obligation, the chevra kadisha carries out burial preparations with discretion, simplicity, and equality, reflecting the communal responsibility to honor the deceased and support the bereaved.

Many local chevra kadishas in urban areas are affiliated with local synagogues, and they often own their own burial plots in various local cemeteries. Some Jews pay an annual token membership fee to the chevra kadisha of their choice, so that when the time comes, the society will not only attend to the body of the deceased as befits Jewish law, but will also ensure burial in a plot that it controls at an appropriate nearby Jewish cemetery.

If no gravediggers are available, then it is additionally the function of the male society members to ensure that graves are dug. In Israel, members of chevra kadishas consider it an honor not only to prepare the body for burial but also to dig the grave for a fellow Jew's body, particularly if the deceased was known to be a righteous person.

Many burial societies hold one or two annual fast days, especially the 7th day of Adar, Yartzeit of Moshe Rabbeinu (Moses), and organize regular study sessions to remain up to date with the relevant articles of Jewish law. In addition, most burial societies also support families during the shiva (traditional week of mourning) by arranging prayer services, preparing meals, and providing other services for the mourners.

=== Preparing the body – taharah ===
There are three major stages to preparing the body for burial: washing (rechitzah), ritual purification (taharah), and dressing (halbashah). The term taharah is used to refer both to the overall process of burial preparation, and to the specific step of ritual purification.

Prayers and readings from Torah, including Psalms, Song of Songs, Isaiah, Ezekiel, and Zechariah are recited.

The general sequence of steps for performing taharah is as follows.

1. The body (guf) is uncovered (it has been covered with a sheet awaiting taharah).
2. The body is washed carefully. Any bleeding is stopped and all blood is buried along with the deceased. The body is thoroughly cleaned of dirt, body fluids, and solids, and anything else that may be on the skin. All jewelry is removed. The beard (if present) is not shaved.
3. The body is purified with water, either by immersion in a mikveh or by pouring a continuous stream of 9 kavim (usually 3 buckets) in a prescribed manner.
4. The body is dried (according to most customs).
5. The body is dressed in traditional burial clothing (tachrichim). A sash (avnet) is wrapped around the clothing and tied in the form of the Hebrew letter shin, representing Shaddai, one of the names of God.
6. The casket (aron) (if there is one) is prepared by removing any linings or other embellishments. A winding sheet (sovev) is laid into the casket. Outside the Land of Israel, if the deceased wore a prayer shawl (tallit) during their life, one is laid in the casket for wrapping the body once it is placed therein. One of the corner fringes (tzitzit) is removed from the shawl to signify that it will no longer be used for prayer and that the person is absolved from having to keep any of the mitsvot.
7. The body is lifted into the casket and wrapped in the prayer shawl and sheet. Soil (afar) from the Land of Israel, if available, is placed over various parts of the body and sprinkled in the casket.
8. The casket is closed.

After the closing of the casket, the ḥevra asks forgiveness of the deceased for any inadvertent lack of honor shown to the deceased in the preparation of the body for burial.

Caskets are not used in Israel (with the exception of military and state funerals, when the casket is being carried on the shoulders of others) or in many parts of the Diaspora, especially in Eastern Europe and Arab countries. Instead, the body is carried to the grave (or guided on a gurney) wrapped in a shroud and tallit and placed directly in the earth. In the Diaspora, in general, a casket is only used if required by local law. Traditionally, caskets are simple and made of unfinished wood; both wood with a finish and metal would slow the return of the body to dust (Genesis 3:19). Strictly-observant practice avoids all metal; the wood parts of the casket are joined by wood dowels rather than nails.

There is no viewing of the body and no open casket at the funeral. Sometimes the immediate family verify the identity of the deceased and pay their final respects right before the funeral.

From death until burial, it is traditional for guards or shomrim "watchers" to stay with the deceased. It is traditional to recite Psalms (Tehillim) during this time.

== Funeral service ==
The Jewish funeral consists of a burial, also known as an interment. Cremation is forbidden. Burial is considered to allow the body to decompose naturally, therefore embalming is forbidden. Burial is intended to take place in as short an interval of time after death as possible. Displaying of the body prior to burial does not take place. Flowers are usually not found at a traditional Jewish funeral but may be seen at statesmen's or heroes' funerals in Israel.

In Israel, the Jewish funeral service usually commences at the burial ground. In the United States and Canada, the funeral service commences either at a funeral home or at the cemetery. Occasionally the service will commence at a synagogue. In the case of a prominent individual, the funeral service can begin at a synagogue or a yeshivah. If the funeral service begins at a point other than at the cemetery, the entourage accompanies the body in a procession to the cemetery. Usually the funeral ceremony is brief and includes the recitation of psalms, followed by a eulogy (hesped), and finishes with a traditional closing prayer, the El Maleh Rachamim. The funeral, the procession accompanying the body to the place of burial, and the burial, are referred to by the word levayah, meaning "escorting." Levayah also indicates "joining" and "bonding." This aspect of the meaning of levayah conveys the suggestion of a commonality among the souls of the living and the dead.

Yemenite Jews, prior to their return to the land of Israel, maintained an ancient practice during the funeral procession to halt at, at least, seven stations before the actual burial of the dead, beginning from the entrance of the house from whence the bier is taken, to the graveyard itself. This has come to be known as Ma'amad u'Moshav, (lit. "Standing and Sitting"), or "seven standings and sittings," and is mentioned in Tosefta Pesahim 2: 14–15, during which obsequies only men and boys thirteen years and older took part, but never women. At these stations, the bier is let down by the pallbearers upon the ground, and those accompanying will recite "Hatzur Tamim Pe'ulo," etc. "Ana Bakoach," etc., said in a doleful dirge-like melody, and which verses are followed by one of the party reading certain Midrashic literature and liturgical verse that speaks about death, and which are said to eulogize the deceased.

=== Keriah ===
The mourners traditionally make a tear (keriah or kriah, קריעה) in an outer garment before or at the funeral. The tearing is required to extend in length to a tefach (handbreadth), or what is equivalent to about 9 centimetres (3.5 in). The tear should be on the left side (over the heart and clearly visible) for a parent, including foster parents, and on the right side for siblings (including half-brothers and half-sisters), children, and spouses (and does not need to be visible). Non-Orthodox Jews will often make the keriah in a small black ribbon that is pinned to the lapel rather than in the lapel itself.

In the instance when a mourner receives the news of the death and burial of a relative after an elapsed period of 30 days or more, there is no keriah, or tearing of the garment, except in the case of a parent. In the case of a parent, the tearing of the garment is to be performed no matter how long a period has elapsed between the time of death and the time of receiving the news.

If a child of the deceased needs to change clothes during the shiva period, they must tear the changed clothes. No other family member is required to tear changed clothes during shiva. Children of the deceased may never sew the torn clothes, but any other mourner may mend the clothing 30 days after the burial.

=== Eulogies ===
A hesped is a eulogy, and it is common for several people to speak at the start of the ceremony at the funeral home, as well as prior to burial at the gravesite.

"[A]nd Abraham came to eulogize Sarah." Gen. 23:2 uses the word "Lispod" from which is derived the Hebrew term Hesped.

There is more than one purpose for the eulogy.

- it is both for the deceased and the living, and should appropriately praise the person's good deeds.
- to make us cry

Some people specify in their wills that nothing should be said about them.

==== Days of "no eulogy" ====
Eulogies are forbidden on certain days; likewise on a Friday afternoon.

Some other times are:

- each month's Jewish New Moon (Rosh Chodesh)
- the four days between Yom Kippur and Sukkot
- Chol HaMo'ed ("intermediate days" of Jewish holidays)
- during the month of Nisan

A more general guideline is that when the Tachanun (supplication prayer) is omitted, it is permitted to deliver a brief eulogy emphasizing only the praise of the departed; the extensive eulogy is postponed, and may be said at another time during the year of mourning.

=== Burial ===
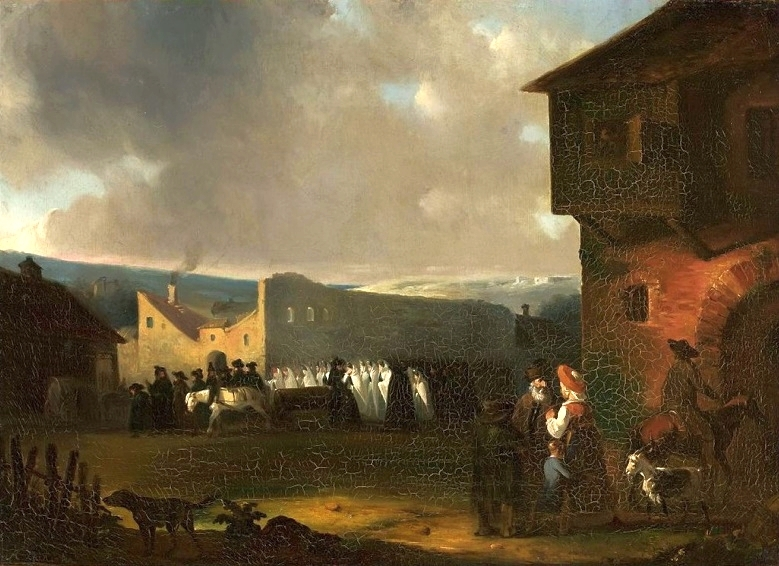
Jewish funeral in Vilnius (1824), National Museum in Warsaw

Kevura, or burial, should take place as soon as possible after death. The Torah requires burial as soon as possible, even for executed criminals. Burial is delayed "for the honor of the deceased," usually to allow more time for far-flung family to come to the funeral and participate in the other post-burial rituals, but also to hire professionals, or to bury the deceased in a cemetery of their choice.

Respect for the dead can be seen from many examples in the Torah and Tanakh. For example, one of the last events in the Torah is the death of Moses when God himself buries him: "[God] buried him in the depression in the land of Moab, opposite Beth Peor. No man knows the place that he was buried, even to this day."

In many traditional funerals, the body, wrapped in a shroud (or casket where used), will be carried from the hearse to the grave in seven stages. These are accompanied by seven recitations of Psalm 91. There is a symbolic pause after each stage (which are omitted on days when a eulogy would also not be recited.)

When the funeral service has ended, the mourners come forward to fill the grave. Symbolically, this gives the mourners closure as they observe, or participate in, the filling of the grave site. One custom is for all people present at the funeral to take a spade or shovel, held pointing down instead of up, to show the antithesis of death to life and that this use of the shovel is different from all other uses, to throw three shovelfuls of dirt into the grave.

Some have the custom to initially use the shovel "backwards" for the first few shovelfuls. Even among those who do it, some limit this to just the first few participants.

When someone is finished, they put the shovel back in the ground, rather than handing it to the next person, to avoid passing along their grief to other mourners. This literal participation in the burial is considered a particularly good mitzvah because it is one for which the beneficiary—the deceased—can offer no repayment or gratitude and thus it is a pure gesture.

Some have a custom, once the grave is filled, to make a rounded topping shape.

After burial, the Tziduk Hadin prayer may be recited affirming that Divine Judgment is righteous.

The family of deceased may then be comforted by other mourners with the formula:

In Ashkenazi communities:

הַמָּקוֹם יְנַחֵם אֶתְכֶם בְּתוֹךְ שְׁאָר אֲבֵלֵי צִיּוֹן וִירוּשָׁלָיִם
Hamakom y'nachem etkhem b'tokh sha'ar avelei tziyon viyrushalayim.
The Omnipresent will comfort you (pl.) among the mourners of Zion and Jerusalem.

In Sephardic communities:

מִן הַשָּׁמַיִם תְּנוּחָמוּ
Min Hashamayim te'nuchamu
From heaven above may you be comforted.

In the 21st century, as space has become scarce in Israeli cemeteries, the ancient practice of burying a person for one year, then exhuming their bones for burial in a smaller plot, has been reestablished.

== Mourning ==
=== Aninut ===
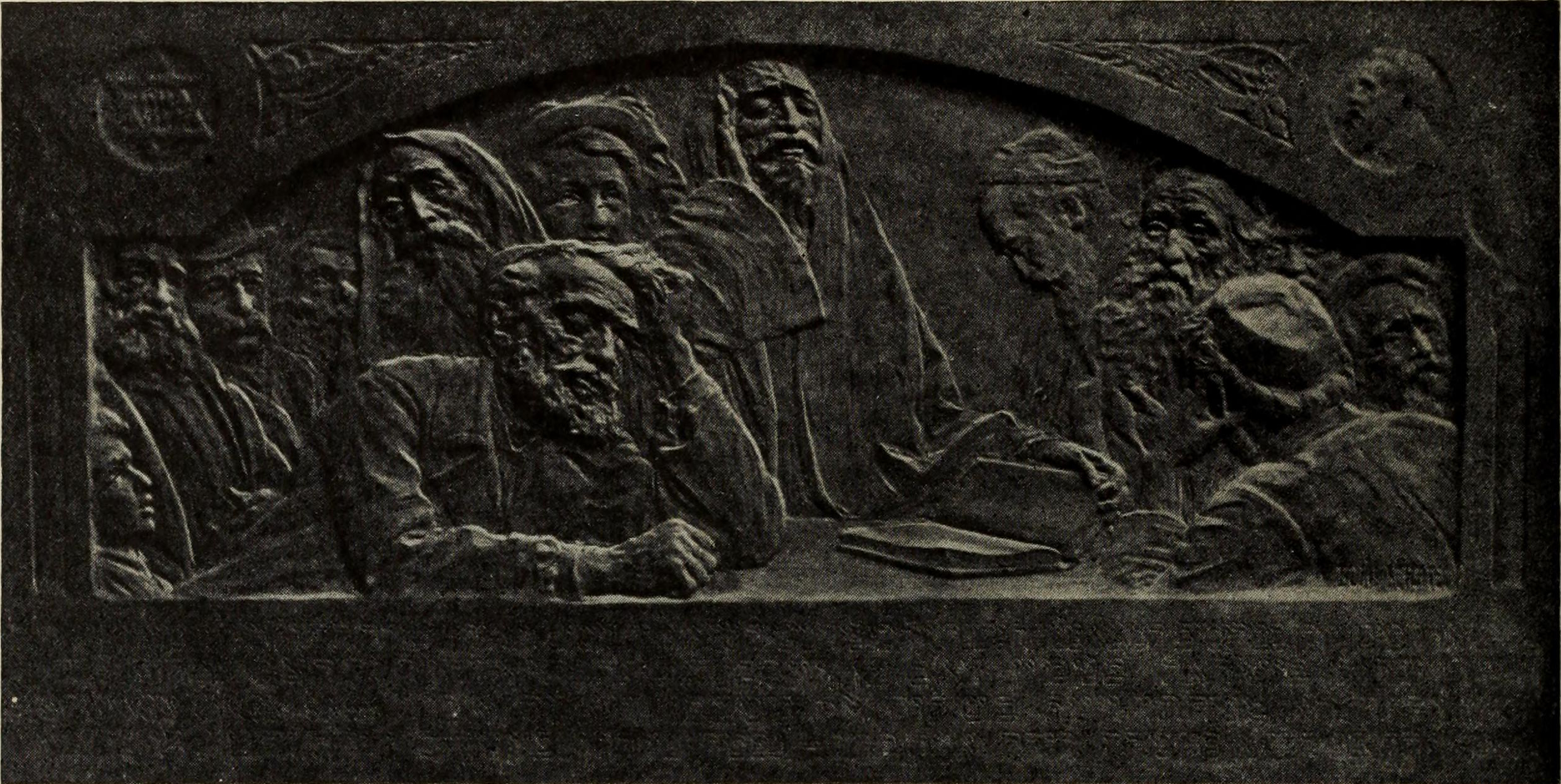
Yiskor for Herzl, by Boris Schatz.

The first stage of mourning is aninut (Hebrew: אנינוּת, lit. '"intense mourning"')." This period lasts until the burial is completed or, if a mourner is unable to attend the funeral, until they are no longer involved in the funeral arrangements.

A person in aninut is known as an onen. The onen is considered to be in a state of total shock and disorientation. Thus, the onen is exempt from performing mitzvot (commandments) that require action and concentration, such as prayer, reciting blessings, wearing tefillin (phylacteries), iso they can tend unhindered to the funeral arrangements. However the onen remains obligated to observe prohibitions, such as not violating the Shabbat.

=== Avelut ===
Aninut is immediately followed by avelut (Hebrew: אֲבֵלוּת, lit. '"mourning"'). An avel ("mourner") traditionally refrains from listening to music, attending concerts, or participating in any joyous or celebratory events such as marriages or bar or bat mitzvahs, except when attendance is unavoidable. If such an event has been scheduled prior to the death, it is strictly forbidden for it to be postponed or cancelled. The occasion of a brit milah is typically an exception to this rule, but with restrictions that vary among Jewish traditions.

Avelut consists of three distinct periods.

==== Shiva – seven days ====
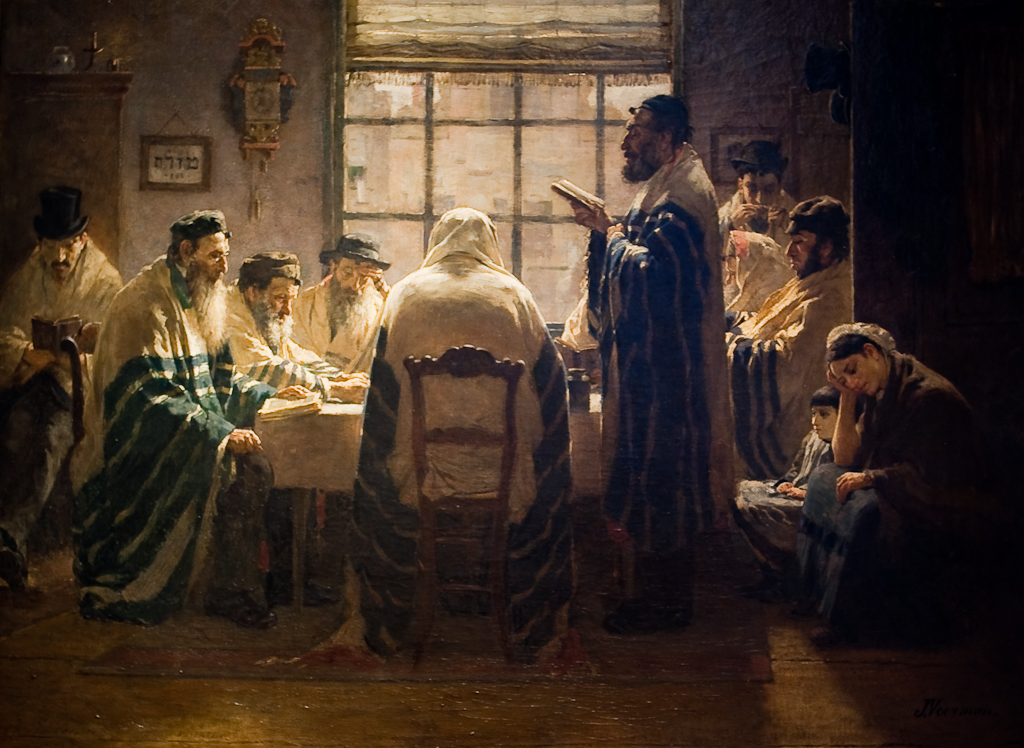
De treurdagen ("The mourning days") by Jan Voerman, ca 1884

The first stage of avelut is shiva (Hebrew: שבעה, lit. '"seven"'), a week-long period of grief and mourning. Observance of shiva is referred to by English-speaking Jews as "sitting shiva". During this period, mourners traditionally gather in one home and receive visitors.

When they get home, the mourners refrain for a week from showering or bathing, wearing leather shoes or jewelry, or shaving. In many communities, mirrors in the mourners' home are covered since they should not be concerned about their personal appearance. It is customary for the mourners to sit on low stools or even the floor, symbolic of the emotional reality of being "brought low" by the grief. The meal of consolation (seudat havra'ah), the first meal eaten on returning from the funeral, traditionally consists of hard-boiled eggs and other round or oblong foods. This is often credited to the Biblical story of Jacob purchasing the birthright from Esau with stewed lentils (Genesis 25:34); it is traditionally stated that Jacob was cooking the lentils soon after the death of his grandfather Abraham.

During shiva, family and friends come to visit or call on the mourners to comfort them ("shiva calls"). This is considered a great mitzvah (commandment) of kindness and compassion. Traditionally, no greetings are exchanged and visitors wait for the mourners to initiate conversation. The mourner is under no obligation to engage in conversation and may, in fact, completely ignore their visitors. Visitors will traditionally take on the hosting role when attending a Shiva, often bringing food and serving it to the mourning family and other guests. The mourning family will often avoid any cooking or cleaning during the Shiva period; those responsibilities become those of visitors.

There are various customs as to what to say when taking leave of the mourner(s). Ashkenazi Jews recite a traditional phrase that wishes comfort to a mourner by a reassurance that they will eventually reconnect to the person who died, in the same way that God comforts the Jewish people for the destruction of the Second Temple nearly 2,000 years ago through the promise of its eventual rebuilding in the times of the Messiah. The visitor says to the mourner:

הַמָּקוֹם יְנַחֵם אֶתְכֶם בְּתוֹךְ שְׁאָר אֲבֵלֵי צִיּוֹן וִירוּשָׁלָיִם
Hamakom y'nachem etkhem b'tokh sha'ar avelei tziyon viyrushalayim:
"May The Omnipresent comfort you (pl.) among the mourners of Zion and Jerusalem"

Depending on their community's customs, others may also add such wishes as: "You should have no more tza'ar (distress)" or "You should have only simchas (celebrations)" or "we should hear only besorot tovot (good tidings) from each other" or "I wish you a long life".

Traditionally, prayer services are organized in the house of mourning. It is customary for the family to lead the services themselves.

==== Shloshim – thirty days ====
The thirty-day period following burial (including shiva) is known as shloshim (Hebrew: שלושים, lit. 'thirty'). During shloshim, a mourner is forbidden to marry or to attend a seudat mitzvah (religious festive meal). Men do not shave or get haircuts during this time.

Since Judaism teaches that a deceased person can still benefit from the merit of mitzvot (commandments) performed in their memory, it is considered a special privilege to bring merit to the departed by learning Torah in their name. A popular custom amongst Orthodox Jews is to coordinate a group of people who will jointly study the complete Mishnah during the shloshim period. This is due to the fact that "Mishnah" (משנה) and "Neshamah" (נשמה), soul, have the same (Hebrew) letters.

==== Shneim asar chodesh – twelve months ====
Those mourning a parent additionally observe a twelve-month period (Hebrew: שנים עשר חודש, romanized: shneim asar chodesh, lit. 'twelve months'), counted from the day of death. During this period, most activity returns to normal, although the mourners continue to recite the Kaddish as part of synagogue services for eleven months. In Orthodox tradition, this is an obligation of the sons (not daughters) as mourners. There remain restrictions on attending festive occasions and large gatherings, especially where live music is performed.

==== Unveiling of the tombstone ====
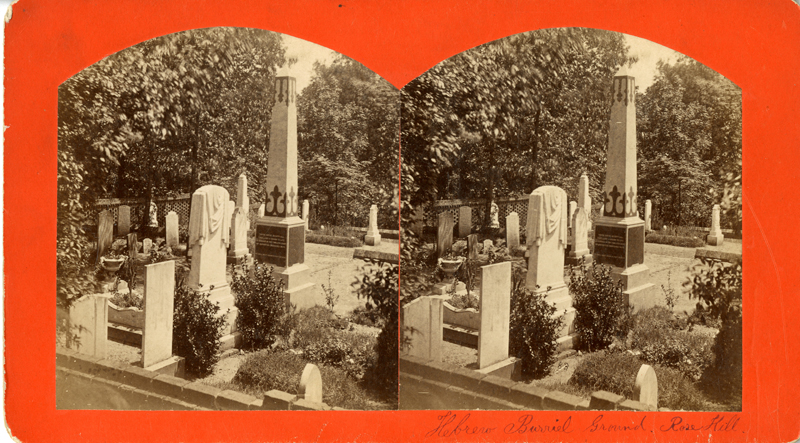
Headstones in the Hebrew Lot, Rose Hill Cemetery, Macon, Bibb County, GA, c.1877.

A headstone (tombstone) is known as a matzevah (Hebrew: "pillar", "statue", or "monument"). Although there is no halakhic obligation to hold an unveiling ceremony (the ritual became popular in many communities toward the end of the 19th century), there are varying customs about when it should be placed on the grave. Most communities have an unveiling ceremony a year after the death. Some communities have it earlier, even a week after the burial. In Israel it is done after the shloshim (the first 30 days of mourning). There is no universal restriction about the timing, other than the unveiling cannot be held during Shabbat, (work-restricted) Jewish holidays, or Chol Ha'Moed.

At the end of the ceremony, a cloth or shroud covering that has been placed on the headstone is removed, customarily by close family members. Services include reading of several psalms. Gesher HaChaim cites (chapters) "33, 16, 17, 72, 91, 104, and 130; then one says Psalm 119 and recites the verses that spell the name of the deceased and the letters of the word Neshama.". This is followed by the Mourner's Kaddish (if a minyan is available), and the prayer "El Malei Rachamim". The service may include a brief eulogy for the deceased.

=== Monuments ===
Originally, it was not common practice to place names on tombstones. The general custom for engraving the name of the deceased on the monument is a practice that goes back (only) "the last several hundred years."

Jewish communities in Yemen, prior to their immigration to the Land of Israel, did not place headstones over the graves of the dead, except only on rare occasions, choosing rather to follow the dictum of Rabban Shimon ben Gamliel who said: "They do not build monuments (i.e. tombstones) for the righteous. Their words, lo! They are their memorial!" Philosopher and Halachic decisor, Maimonides, likewise, ruled that it is not permissible to raise headstones over the graves of righteous men, but permits doing so for ordinary men. In contrast, the more recent custom of Spanish Jewry, following the teachings of Yitzhak Luria (Shaʿar Ha-Mitzvot, Parashat Vayeḥi), is to build tombstones over the grave, seeing it as part of the complete atonement and amendment for those who have died. Likewise, Rabbi Shelomo b. Avraham Aderet (RASHBA) wrote that it is a way of showing honor to the dead. In this manner the custom did spread, especially among the Jews of Spain, North Africa and Ashkenaz. Today, in Israel, all Jewish graves are marked with headstones.

== Annual remembrances ==
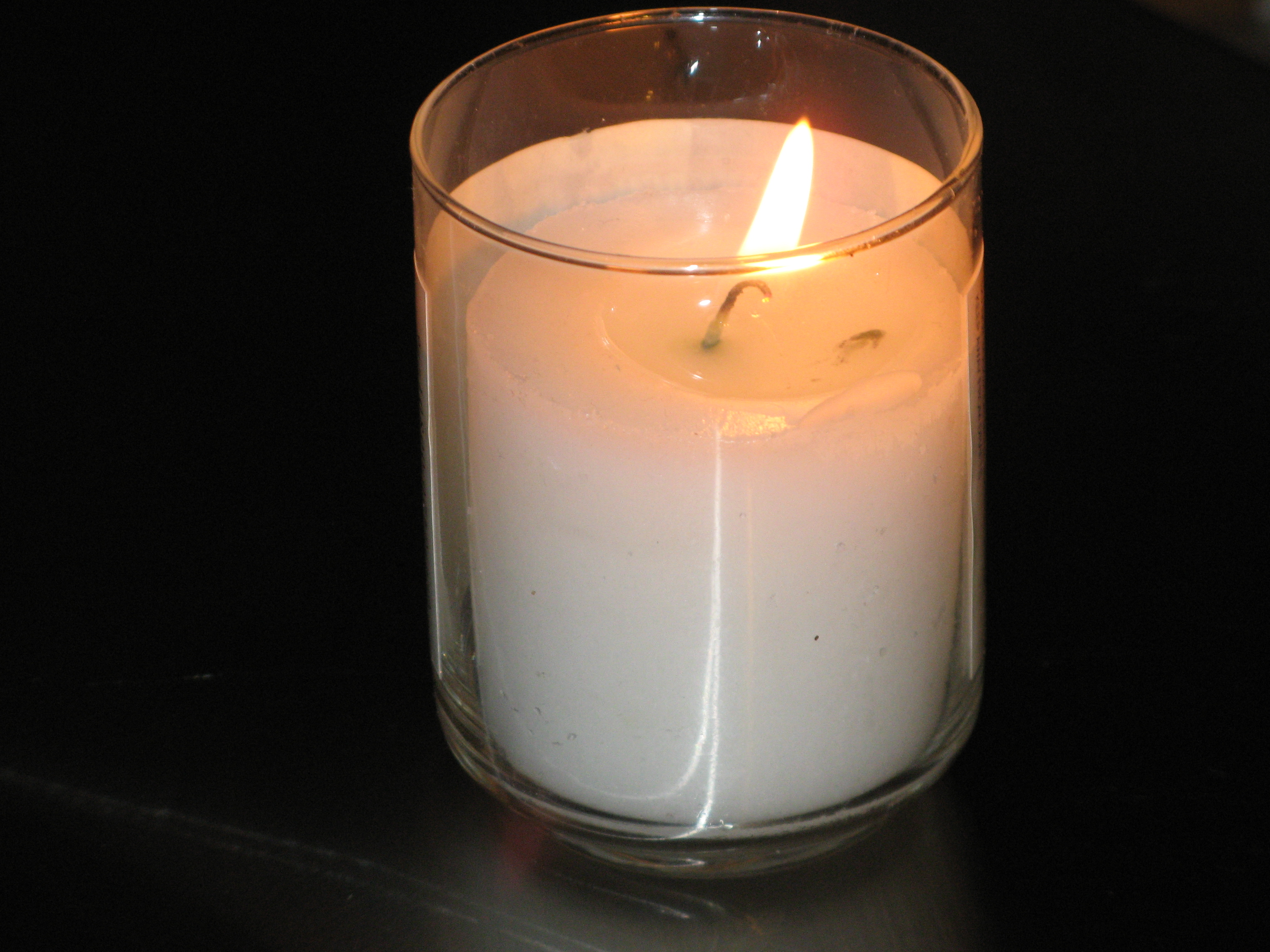
A yahrtzeit candle lit in memory of a loved one on the anniversary of the death

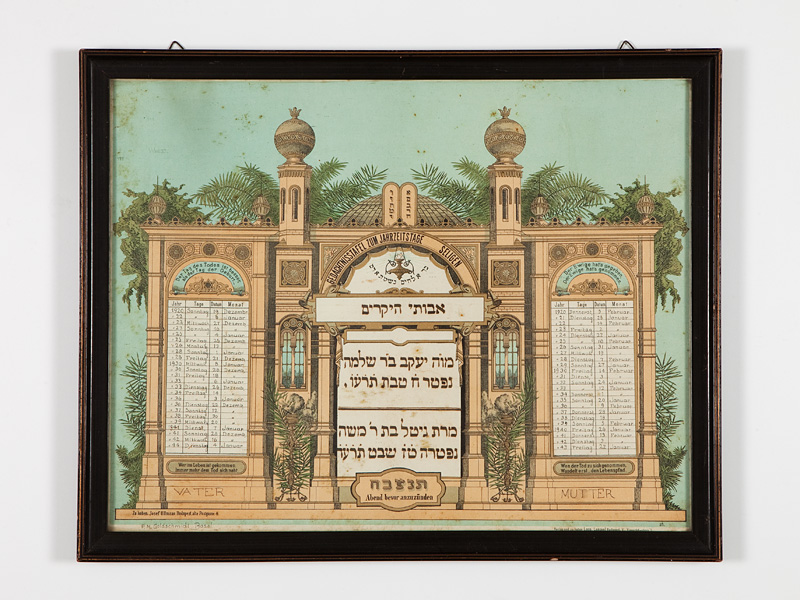
Early 20th-century Yahrzeit table, in the collection of the Jewish Museum of Switzerland.

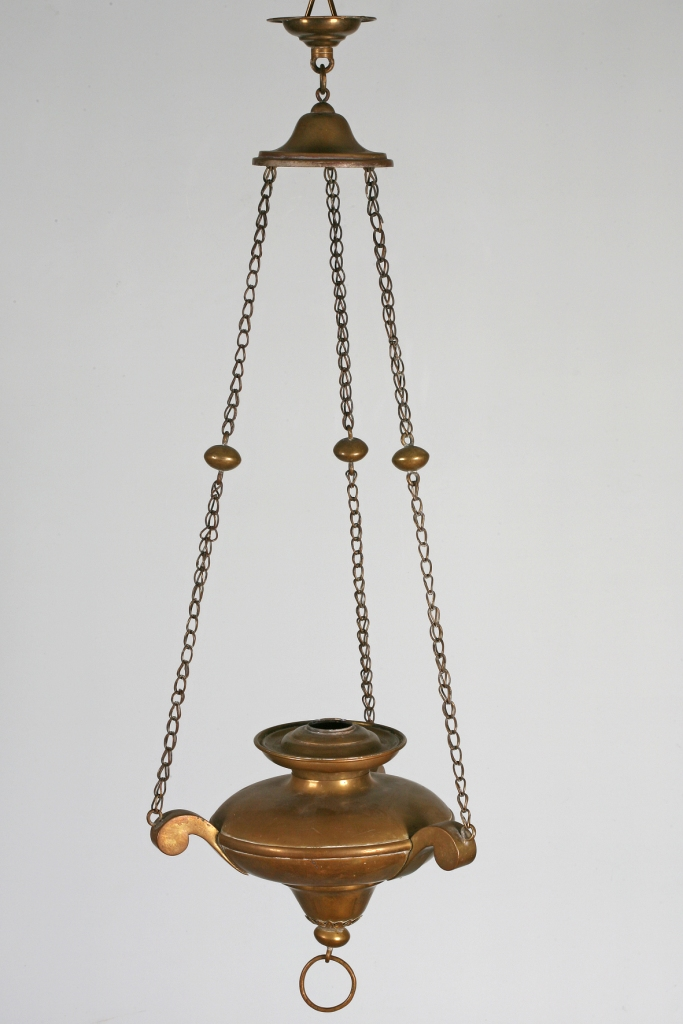
Yahrtzeitlicht from Lengnau in Aargau (Switzerland), 1830.

=== Anniversary of death (yortseyt) ===
Yortseyt (Yiddish: יאָרצײַט) means "time (of) year" in Yiddish. Alternative spellings include yahrtzeit, Jahrzeit (in German), yohr tzeit, yahrzeit, and yartzeit. The word is used by Ashkenazi Jews and refers to the anniversary, according to the Hebrew calendar, of the day of death of a loved one. On the anniversary of a death, it is the custom to light a candle to commemorate the departure of a loved one. These are called yortseytlikht, meaning "yahrzeit candle". In order to keep track of the yortseyt, special time boards are used (German Jahrzeittafel). They are used both in synagogues and in private contexts. They list the date of death of one person (sometimes several) according to the Hebrew calendar for the next few years, and are then used by families to keep track of when the next yortseyt will be. Mostly the tablets are preprinted and secondarily adapted for the person in question (name and date of death).

Non-Ashkenazi communities use other names for the anniversary of a death. The commemoration is known in Hebrew as נחלה naḥala "legacy, inheritance". This term is used by most Sephardic Jews, although some use the term Ladino: מילדאדו, romanized: meldado, or, less commonly, anyos "years". Persian Jews refer to this day as sāl (Persian: سال "year").

=== Commemorating ===
Jews are required to commemorate the death of parents, siblings, spouses, or children.

1. When an immediate relative (parent, sibling, spouse or child) initially hears of the death of a relative, it is traditional to express one's grief by tearing their clothing and saying "baruch dayan ha-emet" ("blessed is the true judge").
2. Shiva is observed by parents, children, spouses and siblings of the deceased, preferably all together in the deceased's home. There is a halakhic obligation for sons to recite the Mourner's Kaddish for their parents. The various mourning customs are first discussed in detail in Sefer HaMinhagim (pub. 1566) by Isaac Tyrnau.

Some Jews believe that strict Jewish law requires that one should fast on the day of a parent's yortseyt; although most believe this is not required, some people do observe the custom of fasting on the day of the yortseyt, or at least refraining from meat and wine. Among many Orthodox Jews it has become customary to make a siyum by completing a tractate of Talmud or a volume of the Mishnah on the day prior to the Yahrtzeit, in the honor of the deceased. A halakha requiring a siyum ("celebratory meal"), upon the completion of such a study, overrides the requirement to fast.

Many synagogues will have lights on a special memorial plaque on one of the synagogue's walls, with names of synagogue members who have died. Each of these lights will be lit for individuals on their Yahrzeit (and in some synagogues, the entire Hebrew month). All the lights will be lit for a Yizkor service. Some synagogues will also turn on all the lights for memorial days, such as Yom Ha'Shoah.

=== Visiting the gravesite ===
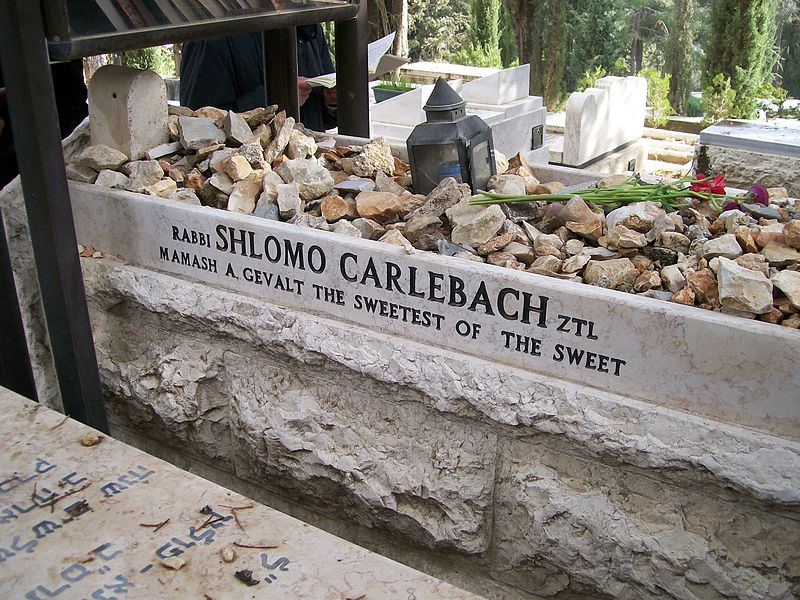
The grave of rabbi-singer Shlomo Carlebach in Jerusalem is piled with stones left by visitors.

Some have a custom to visit the cemetery on fast days (Shulchan Aruch Orach Chayim 559:10) and before Rosh Hashanah and Yom Kippur (581:4, 605), when possible, and for a Yahrzeit. During the first year the grave is often visited on the shloshim, and the yartzeit (but may be visited at any time).

Even when visiting Jewish graves of someone that the visitor never knew, the custom is to place a small stone on the grave using the left hand. This shows that someone visited the gravesite, and is also a way of participating in the mitzvah of burial. Leaving flowers is not a traditional Jewish practice. Another reason for leaving stones is to tend the grave. In Biblical times, gravestones were not used; graves were marked with mounds of stones (a kind of cairn), so by placing (or replacing) them, one perpetuated the existence of the site.

The tradition to travel to the graveside on the occasion of a Yahrzeit is ancient.

== Memorial through prayer ==
=== Mourner's Kaddish ===
Kaddish Yatom (heb. קדיש יתום lit. "Orphan's Kaddish") or the "Mourner's" Kaddish, is said at prayer services, as well as at funerals and memorials. Customs for reciting the Mourner's Kaddish vary markedly among various communities. In many Ashkenazi synagogues, particularly Orthodox ones, it is customary that everyone in the synagogue stands. In Sephardi synagogues, most people sit for most sayings of Kaddish. In many non-Orthodox Ashkenaz ones, the custom is that only the mourners themselves stand and chant, while the rest of the congregation sits, chanting only responsively.

=== Hashkabóth ===
In many Sephardic communities, Hashkabóth ("remembrance") prayers are recited for the deceased in the year following death, on the deceased's death anniversary ("nahalah" or "anyos"), and upon request by the deceased's relatives. Some Sephardic communities also recite Hashkabóth for all their deceased members on Yom Kippur, even those who died many years before.

=== Yizkor ===
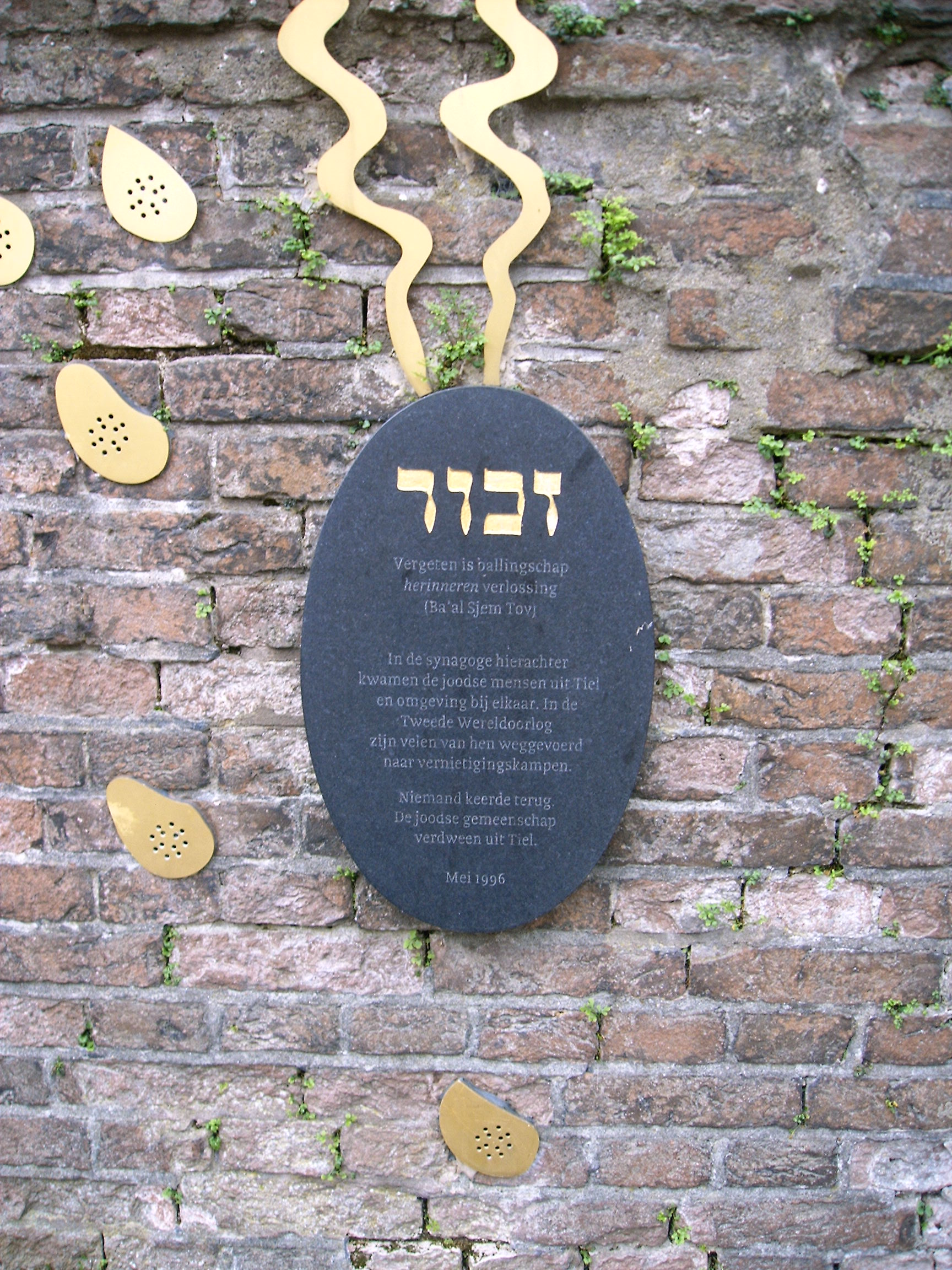
Remembrance plaque in Tiel.

Yizkor (Hebrew: "remembrance") prayers are recited by those that have lost either one or both of their parents. They may additionally say Yizkor for other relatives. Some might also say Yizkor for a deceased close friend. It is customary in many communities for those with both parents alive to leave the synagogue during the Yizkor service while it is said.

The Yizkor prayers are recited in the Eastern Ashkenazic rite four times a year, and are intended to be recited in a synagogue with a minyan; if one is unable to be with a minyan, one can recite it without one. These four Yizkor services are held on Yom Kippur, Shemini Atzeret, on the last day of Passover, and on Shavuot (the second day of Shavuot, in communities that observe Shavuot for two days). In the original Western Ashkenazic rite, Yizkor is recited only on Yom Kippur, and some Western Ashkenazic communities did away with the custom altogether in the mid-19th century.

The primary prayer in the Yizkor service is El Malei Rachamim, in which God is asked to remember and grant repose to the souls of the departed.

Yizkor is customarily not said within the first year of mourning, until the first yahrzeit has passed. This practice is a custom and historically not regarded to be obligatory.

In Sephardic and Yemenite custom there is no Yizkor prayer, but the Hashkabóth serve a similar role in the service.

=== Av HaRachamim ===
Av HaRachamim is a memorial prayer written in the late 11th century after Crusaders destroyed Jewish communities in the Rhineland massacres. In the Eastern Ashkenazic rite, it is recited on many Shabbats before Mussaf, and also at the end of the yizkor service; in the Western Ashkenazic rite, it is recited only twice a year on Shabbats immediately preceding Shavuot and Tisha B'Av.

== Elevation of the soul ==
According to Jewish belief, once a person dies, there is no way for them to accrue merit anymore through doing the mitzvot themselves. However, mitzvot done by the people they influenced (e.g. children, students, family, friends) can still bring them merit.

For this reason, Jews will do mitzvot for the elevation of the soul (L'Illui NishMat – לעלוי נשמת, sometimes abbreviated LI"N (לע"נ)) of a person who died, even for a stranger. Though not limited to any mitzvah, Aliyos (elevation) are often done through:

- Kaddish (on the mourner's part)
- Charity – Tzedakah
- Dissemination of Torah learning and other mitzvot
- Joint Tehillim Reading
- Personal study and review, especially of Mishnah. The same letters that spell the Hebrew word MiShNaH (משנה) spell the Hebrew word for "soul", NeShaMaH נשמה).
- Saying of brachos on food and drink, or sponsoring said food (Tikkun)

The Hebrew name of the deceased is commonly mentioned alongside these acts, or printed in said books or placed on a placard next to consumables – with the exception of kaddish.

=== Tikkun (sponsoring food) ===
At first a Hassidic custom, at first deriving from making a siyum on the yahrzeit, nowadays practised without one with the intention that the bracha said over the food brings an aliya. Schnapps and baked goods are popularly sponsored, though any kosher food or drink may be used.

== Communal responses to death ==
Most Jewish communities of size have non-profit organizations that maintain cemeteries and provide chevra kadisha services for those in need. They are often formed out of a synagogue's women's group.

=== Zihui Korbanot Asson (ZAKA) ===
ZAKA (heb. זק"א abbr. for Zihui Korbanot Asson lit. "Identifying Victims of Disaster" – חסד של אמת Hessed shel Emet lit. "True Kindness" – איתור חילוץ והצלה), is a community emergency response team in the State of Israel, officially recognized by the government. The organization was founded in 1989. Members of ZAKA, most of whom are Orthodox, assist ambulance crews, identify the victims of terrorism, road accidents and other disasters and, where necessary, gather body parts and spilled blood for proper burial. They also provide first aid and rescue services, and help with the search for missing persons. In the past they have responded in the aftermath of disasters around the world.

=== Hebrew Free Burial Association (HFBA) ===
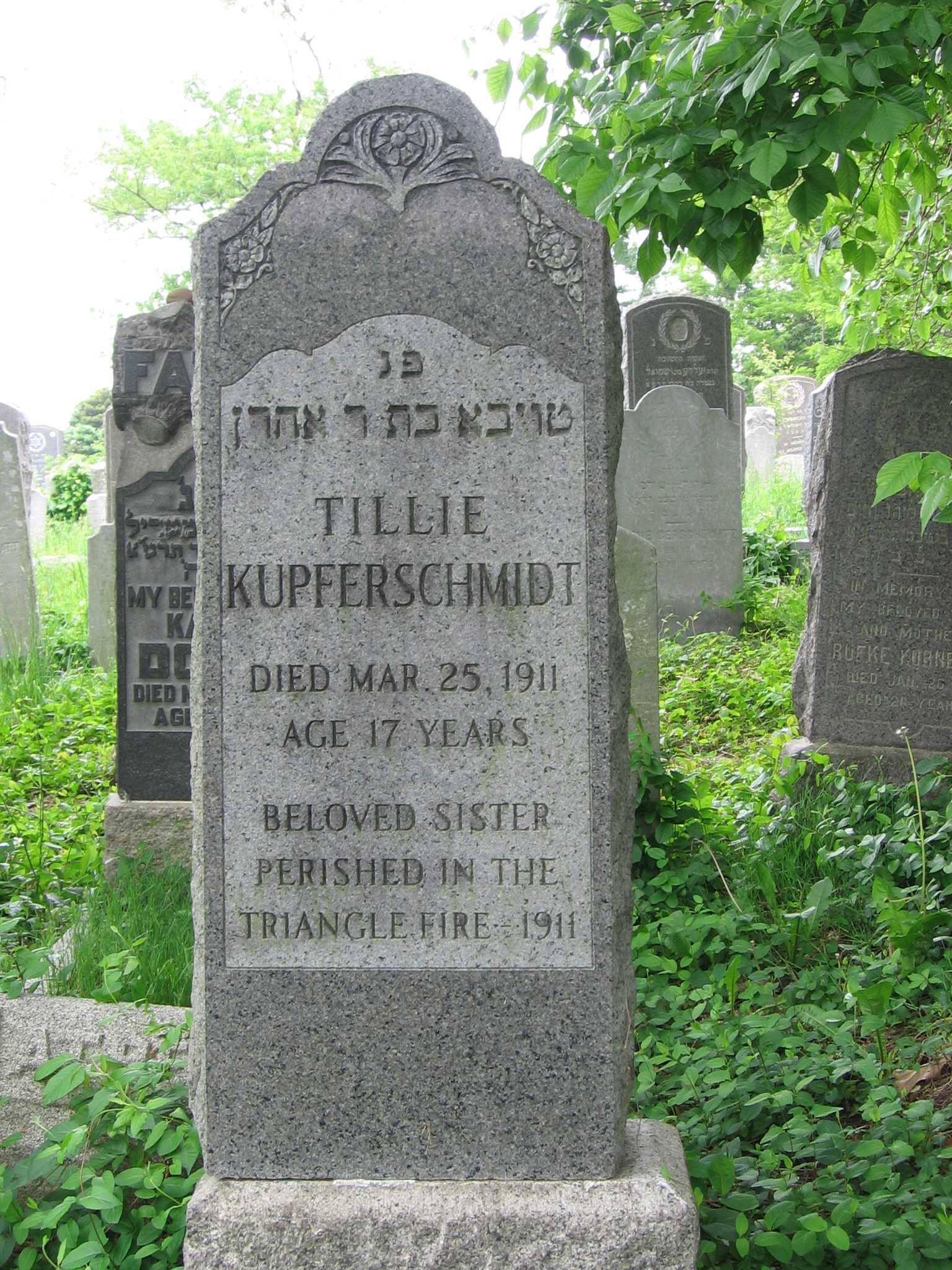
Tombstone of victim of Triangle Shirtwaist Fire at the Hebrew Free Burial Association's Mount Richmond Cemetery.

The Hebrew Free Burial Association is a non-profit agency whose mission is to ensure that all Jews receive a proper Jewish burial, regardless of their financial ability. Since 1888, more than 55,000 Jews have been buried by HFBA in their cemeteries located on Staten Island, New York, Silver Lake Cemetery and Mount Richmond Cemetery.

=== Hebrew Benevolent Society of Los Angeles ===
Formed in 1854 for the purpose of "procuring a piece of ground suitable for the purpose of a burying ground for the deceased of their own faith, and also to appropriate a portion of their time and means to the holy cause of benevolence", the Hebrew Benevolent Society of Los Angeles established the first Jewish cemetery in Los Angeles at Lilac Terrace and Lookout Drive in Chavez Ravine (current home to Dodger Stadium). In 1968, a plaque was installed at the original site, identifying it as California Historical Landmark #822.

In 1902, because of poor environmental conditions due to the unchecked expansion of the oil industry in the area, it was proposed by Congregation B'nai B'rith to secure a new plot of land in what is now East LA, and to move the buried remains to the new site, with a continued provision for burial of indigent people. This site, the Home of Peace Memorial Park, remains operational and is the oldest Jewish cemetery in Los Angeles. The original society is now known as the "Jewish Family Service of Los Angeles".

== Controversy following death ==
=== Donating organs ===
According to some Jewish denominations, once death has been clearly established, provided that instructions have been left in a written living will, donation may be done. However, there are a number of practical difficulties for those who wish to adhere strictly to Jewish law. For example, someone who is dead by clinical standards may not yet be dead according to Jewish law. Jewish law does not permit donation of organs that are vital for survival from a donor who is in a near-dead state but who is not yet dead according to Jewish law. Orthodox and Haredi Jews may need to consult their rabbis on a case-by-case basis.

Since 2001, with the founding of the Halachic Organ Donor Society, organ donation has become more common in modern orthodox Jewish communities, especially with the support of rabbis like Moshe Tendler and Norman Lamm.

=== Jewish view of cremation ===
Halakha (Jewish law) forbids cremation. Tacitus described as "a distinguishing characteristic" that "Jews buried, rather than burned, their dead." Judaism stresses burial in the earth (including entombment, as in caves) as a religious duty of laying a person's remains to rest. This, as well as the belief that the human body is created in the image of the divine and is not to be vandalized before or after death, teaches the belief that it was necessary to keep the whole body intact in burial, in anticipation of the eventual resurrection of the dead in the messianic age. Nevertheless, some Jews who are not religiously adherent, or who have attached to an alternative movement or religious stream that does not see some or all the laws of the Torah as binding upon them, have chosen cremation, either for themselves prior to death, or for their loved ones.

=== Suicide ===
As Judaism considers suicide to be a form of murder, a Jew who commits suicide is denied some important after-death privileges: No eulogies should be given for the deceased, and burial in the main section of the Jewish cemetery is normally not allowed.

In recent times, most people who die by suicide have been deemed to be the unfortunate victims of depression or of a serious mental illness. Under this interpretation, their act of "self-murder" is not deemed to be a voluntary act of self-destruction, but rather the result of an involuntary condition. They have therefore been looked upon as having died of causes beyond their control.

Additionally, the Talmud (in Semakhot, one of the minor tractates) recognizes that many elements of the mourning ritual exist as much for the living survivors as for the dead, and that these elements ought to be carried out even in the case of the suicide.

Furthermore, if reasonable doubt exists that the death was suicidal or that the deceased might have changed her mind and repented at the last moment (e.g., if it is unknown whether the victim fell or jumped from a building, or if the person falling changed her mind mid-fall), the benefit of the doubt is given and regular burial and mourning rituals take place. Lastly, the suicide of a minor is considered a result of a lack of understanding ("da'at"), and in such a case, regular mourning is observed.

=== Tattoos ===
Halakha (Jewish law) forbids tattoos, and a myth persists that having a tattoo prevents burial in a Jewish cemetery. While a small minority of burial societies may not accept a corpse with a tattoo, Jewish law does not mention burial of tattooed Jews, and nearly all burial societies have no such restriction. Removing the tattoo of a deceased Jew is forbidden, as this would be considered damaging the body. This case has been one of public interest in the current generations due to the large population tattooed in Nazi concentration camps between 1940 and 1945. Since those tattoos were forced upon the recipients in a situation where any resistance could expect official murder or brutality, their presence is not in any way reflective of any violation of Jewish law on the part of both the living and deceased; rather under these circumstances it shows adherence to the positive command to preserve innocent life, including one's own, by passively allowing the mark to be applied.

=== Death of an apostate Jew ===
There is no mourning for an apostate Jew according to Jewish law. (See that article for a discussion of precisely what actions and motivations render a Jew an "apostate.")

In the past several centuries, the custom developed among Ashkenazic Orthodox Jews (including Hasidic and Haredi Jews), that the family would "sit shiva" if and when one of their relatives would leave the fold of traditional Judaism. The definition of "leaving the fold" varies within communities; some would sit shiva if a family member married a non-Jew; others would only sit shiva if the individual actually converted to another faith, and even then, some would make a distinction between those who chose to do so of their own will, and those who were pressured into conversion. (In Sholom Aleichem's Tevye, when the title character's daughter converts to Christianity to marry a Christian, Tevye sits shiva for her and generally refers to her as "dead.") At the height of the so called Mitnagdim (a Hasidic term for traditional mainline Ashkenazi practitioners, meaning 'those who are against', meaning against the changes introduced by Chasidim) movement, in the early-to-mid nineteenth century, some families even sat shiva if a family member joined the Hasidim. (It is said that when Leibel Eiger joined Hasidism, his father, Rabbi Shlomo Eiger sat shiva, but his grandfather, the famed Rabbi Akiva Eiger, did not. It is also said that Leibel Eiger came to be menachem avel [console the mourner]). By the mid-twentieth century, however, Hasidism was recognized by most traditional Ashkenazim as a valid form of Orthodox Judaism, and thus the (controversial) practice of sitting shiva for those who realign to Hasidism almost completely ceased to exist.

Today, some Orthodox Jews, particularly the more strictly observant ones (such as many Haredi and Hasidic communities), maintain the practice of sitting shiva for a family member who has left the religious community. Most Jews, especially liberal Jews and Jewish religious communities, however, question the practice, eschewing it as a harsh act that could make it more difficult for the family member to return to traditional practice at a later date.

== Days of remembrance ==
- Tisha B'Av – A day of mourning for the destruction of both the First and Second Temple in Jerusalem and other events
- Yom Kippur, Shemini Atzeret, final day of Pesach, Shavuot – The four days on which Yizkor is recited
- Tenth of Tevet – Fast day on which it has become a custom for some to say Kaddish for those whose yahrzeits are unknown or who were murdered in the Holocaust
- Yom HaShoah – National day of remembrance in Israel (and by many Jews worldwide) for those murdered in the Holocaust as well as for the Righteous Among the Nations
- Yom Hazikaron – National day of remembrance in Israel for those who died in service of Israel or were killed in terrorist attacks

== See also ==
- Chevra kadisha
- Heaven in Judaism
- Honorifics for the dead in Judaism
- Jewish eschatology
- Kaddish
- Nahala (disambiguation page), Hebrew word for heritage or estate widely used for toponyms in Israel
- Rock-cut tombs in ancient Israel
- Shiva
- Yahrtzeit candle
