= Shemira =

Jewish religious ritual

Shemira (Hebrew: שמירה, lit. "watching" or "guarding") refers to the Jewish custom of watching over the body of a deceased person from the time of death until burial. Shemira is practiced out of respect for the dead, in that they should not be abandoned prior to their arrival in their new "home" in the ground. This serves as a comfort for the surviving loved ones as well.

Burial is intended to take place in as short an interval of time after death as possible. Displaying of the body prior to burial does not take place.

== Etymology ==
A male guardian is called a shomer (שומר), and a female guardian is a shomeret (שומרת). Shomrim (plural, שומרים) are people who perform shemira. In Israel, shemira refers to all forms of guard duty, including military guard duty. An armed man or woman appointed to patrol a grounds or campus for security purposes would be called a shomer or shomeret.

== Origins ==
Performing shemira is considered a mitzvah. The Shulhan Aruch (Yoreh Deah 341:6) explains that one who is guarding the body is exempt from all other mitzvot.

Historically, shemira was a form of guard duty, to prevent the desecration of a body prior to burial. In the Talmud, in b. Berachot 18a and Shabbat 151b, the purpose of shemira was to guard against rodents, as rodents fear the living and not the dead, an idea derived from Genesis 9:2 which puts the fear of man into other living creatures.

According to various midrashic tradition, while the burial will have taken place as soon as possible and generally within a day or two, the soul hovers over the body for either three days (Genesis Rabbah 100:7 and Leviticus Rabbah 18:1) or seven days—the period of shiva—mourning (Pirke de Rabbi Eliezer, chapter 34) after death. The human soul is somewhat lost and confused between death and before burial, and it stays in the general vicinity of the body, until the body is interred.

== Practice ==
It is not necessary for the shomrim to be literally watching the body, which may be covered or in a closed casket already, but there should be someone present in the room at all times. In some cases this may extend to the next room, provided that the door to the room of the deceased is open. Other traditions consider it acceptable as long as someone is present in the building.

The shomrim sit and read aloud comforting psalms during the time that they are watching the body. This serves as a comfort for both the spirit of the departed who is in transition, and the shomer or shomeret. Traditionally, shomrim read Psalms or the Book of Job. Shomrim are also encouraged to meditate, pray, and read spiritual texts, or texts about death. They are prohibited from eating, drinking, or smoking in the shemira room out of respect for the dead, who can no longer do these things.

Shomrim are allowed to be paid, as this mitzvah is not benefiting from the dead, but helping to relieve the burden of the relatives whose duty it is to guard the body. In some communities, individuals are paid to do this, while in others it is done on a volunteer basis, often by friends of the family of the deceased or members of a chevra kadisha (Jewish burial society).

== See also ==
- Bereavement in Judaism
- The Vigil
