= Shiva (Judaism) =

Week-long mourning period in Judaism for first-degree relatives

Shiva (Hebrew: שִׁבְעָה, romanized: šīvʿā, lit. 'seven', also spelled "shibah") is the week-long mourning period in Judaism for first-degree relatives. The ritual is referred to as "sitting shiva" in English. The shiva period lasts for seven days following the burial. Following the initial period of despair and lamentation immediately after the death, shiva embraces a time when individuals discuss their loss and accept the comfort of others.

Its observance is a requirement for the parents, siblings, spouses, and children of the person who has died. At the funeral, mourners wear an outer garment that is torn before the procession in a ritual known as keriah. In some traditions, mourners wear a black ribbon that is cut in place of an everyday garment. The torn article is worn throughout the entirety of shiva. Typically, the seven days begin immediately after the deceased has been buried. Following burial, mourners assume the halakhic status of avel (Hebrew: אבל, lit. 'mourner'). This state lasts for the entire duration of shiva.

It is necessary for the burial spot to be entirely covered with earth in order for shiva to commence. During the period of shiva, mourners remain at home. Friends and family visit those in mourning in order to give their condolences and provide comfort. The process, dating back to biblical times, formalizes the natural way an individual confronts and overcomes grief. Shiva allows for the individual to express their sorrow, discuss the loss of a loved one, and slowly reenter society.

== Etymology ==
The word shiva comes from Hebrew: שבעה, romanized: šib̲ʿā, lit. 'seven', referring to the seven-day length of this period.

== Biblical accounts similar to shiva ==
A number of Biblical accounts describe mourning for fixed periods; in several cases, this period is seven days. For example, after the death of Jacob, his son Joseph and those accompanying Joseph observed a seven-day mourning period. The seven-day period of mourning that Joseph underwent was depicted by the sages before the revelation at Mount Sinai. In the Book of Job, it is stated that Job mourned his misfortune for seven days. During this time, he sat on the ground, with his friends surrounding him.

Biblical mourning involved refraining from feasts, songs, and Temple rituals. Amos declared to the people that God would "turn your feasts into mourning, and all your songs into lamentations" as a punishment for sin, describing this mourning as similar to "the mourning for an only son". After two of the sons of Aaron, a High Priest, were killed, Aaron refused to eat the animal sacrifices, saying this would be inappropriate at a time when he was mourning the sons' death.

== Stages of bereavement ==
The process of mourning begins with the first stage, otherwise known as aninut. During this time, individuals experience the initial shock of their loss. Often emotions associated with the period of aninut include anger, denial, and disbelief. During this period, which technically precedes the official mourning, the mourner is exempt from performing most positive commandments. The keriah (the rending of the garments) is performed during this period. Aninut begins the moment the individual dies and lasts until the end of the funeral service. Following aninut is shiva, in which the mourners dedicate seven days to remembrance of the deceased person. Throughout shiva, individuals are instructed to take a break from their routines in order to focus on their loss. For these seven days the mourners' home is generally an open house for friends and family to come to offer comfort. The stage of mourning known as sheloshim (literally "thirty") lasts until thirty days after the burial. The first seven days of sheloshim is the period of shiva; sheloshim continues after shiva has ended. After the intense period of shiva, which is mainly contained to the home, during the remainder of sheloshim the bereaved leave their residences and begin to interact with others again. Sheloshim encourages individuals to participate in social relations in order to slowly ease back into normal daily activities. The final stage, shenat aveilut, is a twelve-month period of mourning, during which limitations are placed on mourners in the realms of wearing newly bought clothing, attending social gatherings and receiving gifts. During the first eleven months Kaddish is said. After the year's conclusion, yearly remembrance ceremonies, known as yahrzeit or hilula (on the date of passing) and yizkor (on major holidays) are held for the individual who died.

== Computing the timing of shiva and sheloshim ==
The shiva period commences immediately after the burial. The remainder of the day (until sundown) is considered to be the first day of shiva, even though it is only a partial day. On the seventh day (e.g., on Monday, if the first day was Tuesday), shiva ends in the morning after shacharit prayers (if no public services are held on the morning of the seventh day, a service is conducted in the home of the mourner); thus, the seventh day is again a partial day. The sheloshim (thirty-day period of mourning) continues until the end of morning services on the 30th day, 23 days after the end of shiva; as with shiva, the two partial days at the beginning and end are counted as full days.

Had the news of a close relative's death reached them 30 days after their deceased relative had expired, the 30th-day included, the mourner is only obligated to sit in mourning for one day. However, had the news of a close relative's death reached them within 30 days after expiration, the mourner is required to sit in mourning for seven days.

=== Religious holidays during times of mourning ===
Religious holidays during shiva and sheloshim change the mourning period slightly. Because Judaism embraces the holidays with joy, the sadness and grief associated with mourning are meant to be set aside until the holiday concludes. Typically, if an individual dies before the beginning of a holiday, the holiday removes the observance of shiva or sheloshim. The days of the holiday are counted towards the days of mourning, and the rules enforced during mourning are revoked in order to encourage the celebration of a holiday. If a death occurred during the holiday or unknowingly, mourning commences after the holiday ends. In other situations, if the entirety of shiva has been observed prior to the start of a holiday, the holiday will cancel the observance of sheloshim, signifying the fulfillment of this period of mourning.

The occurrence of a major Jewish holiday terminates the shiva. If the funeral occurs during a festival, the start of the mourning period is delayed to the end of the festival.

==== Sabbath ====
During Shabbat, private mourning continues, while public mourning is suspended. Individuals are permitted to wear shoes and leave their home to partake in public prayer services. In order to prepare for Shabbat, individuals are allowed to interrupt shiva for up to one hour and fifteen minutes in order to cook, dress, and perform other tasks. If this is not enough time to do so, in certain situations there may be two and a half hours allotted for such.

==== Passover ====
During Passover, any days in observance of shiva before the start will equate to seven when the holiday begins. Since Passover is celebrated for eight days, any mourning prior will total to fifteen days when holiday ends, leaving only fifteen days of observance of sheloshim.

==== Shavuot ====
During Shavuot, any days in observance of shiva before the start will equate to seven when the holiday begins. The first day of Shavuot equates to seven days. The second day of Shavuot is considered the fifteenth day, leaving only fifteen days left of observance of sheloshim.

==== Sukkot ====
During Sukkot, any days in observance of shiva before the start will equate to seven when the holiday begins. Since Sukkot is observed for seven days, any mourning prior will total to fourteen days when the holiday ends. Shemini Atzeret is considered the eighth day of Sukkot, and equates to seven days of mourning. Simchat Torah is considered the twenty-second day of mourning, leaving only eight days of observance of sheloshim.

==== Rosh Hashanah ====
During Rosh Hashanah, any days in observance of shiva before the start will equate to seven days when the holiday begins. Yom Kippur following Rosh Hashanah, will symbolize the end of mourning, and the end of both shiva and sheloshim.

==== Yom Kippur ====
During Yom Kippur, any days in observance of shiva before the start will equate to seven days when the holiday begins. Sukkot, following Yom Kippur, will symbolize the end of mourning, and the end of both shiva and sheloshim.

==== Yom Tov ====
If the death occurs during Yom Tov, shiva does not begin until the burial is completed. Burial may not take place on Yom Tov, but can during the intermediate days of Sukkot or Passover, otherwise known as Chol HaMoed.

==== Chol HaMoed ====
If a burial occurs on Chol HaMoed of Passover, shiva does not begin until after the Yom Tov is completed. In the Diaspora, where most Yamim Tovim are observed for two days, mourning does not take place on the second day, but the day is still counted as one of the days of shiva.

== Shiva customs ==
There are many traditions that are upheld in order to observe shiva. Throughout this time, mourners are required to stay at home and refrain from engaging with the social world.

=== Keriah ===
After hearing of the death of a close relative, Jewish beliefs and traditions instruct individuals to tear their clothing as the primary expression of grief. The process of tearing the garment is known as keriah. The tearing is done while standing and is required to extend in length to a tefach (handbreadth), or what is equivalent to about 9 centimetres (3.5 in). Upon tearing the clothing, the mourner recites a blessing which describes God as "the true Judge". This blessing reminds mourners to acknowledge that God has taken the life of a close relative, and is seen as the first step in the acceptance of grief. The garment is torn over the heart if the individual who died was a parent, or over the chest on the right side if the individual who died was another relative. The torn article of clothing is worn throughout the period of shiva, the only exception being on Shabbat.

=== Washing hands ===
After being near or around the deceased, it is ancient custom to wash oneself, or at minimum wash one's hands, as a means of purification. After a funeral, or visitation to a cemetery, individuals are required to wash hands as a mark of spiritual transition through water. During shiva, it is especially mandatory to do so before entering the home. There are many different origins of this tradition, though the act is typically associated with symbolic cleansing, the idea being that death is impure in a spiritual sense. Within Judaism, the living is thought to emphasize value of life rather than focus on death. When washing hands after visiting the deceased, it is custom to not pass the cup of water used from person to person. The reason behind this stems from the beliefs and hopes of stopping the tragedy it began, rather than allowing it to continue from person to person as symbolized by the passing of the cup.

=== Meal of condolences ===
The first meal which should be eaten after the funeral is known as the seudat havra'ah (Hebrew: סעודת הבראה, lit. 'meal of comforting'). Traditionally, mourners should be served the meal of condolences by neighbors. The act of preparing such meal is considered to be a mitzvah. Though being the tradition, if the meal of condolences is unable to be prepared by a neighbor, extended family may do so, and in the last case the mourner themselves may prepare the meal. It was seen that many times following the death of a loved one, individuals who were in mourning possessed a death wish and often attempted to undergo starvation. The meal given to them upon returning home provided warmth in order to lessen such wishes. In order to be deemed the meal of condolences, the food selections customarily contains several specific dishes. The meal often includes bread, hard-boiled eggs, lentils and sometimes wine. The only time the meal of condolences is not served is when there is no public observance of mourning. While some historical sources exclude this meal in cases of suicide, most contemporary Jewish communities, including Orthodox, Conservative, and Reform, recognize mental distress or mental illness as mitigating factors, and still provide the meal and other mourning rites in many cases.

=== Candles ===
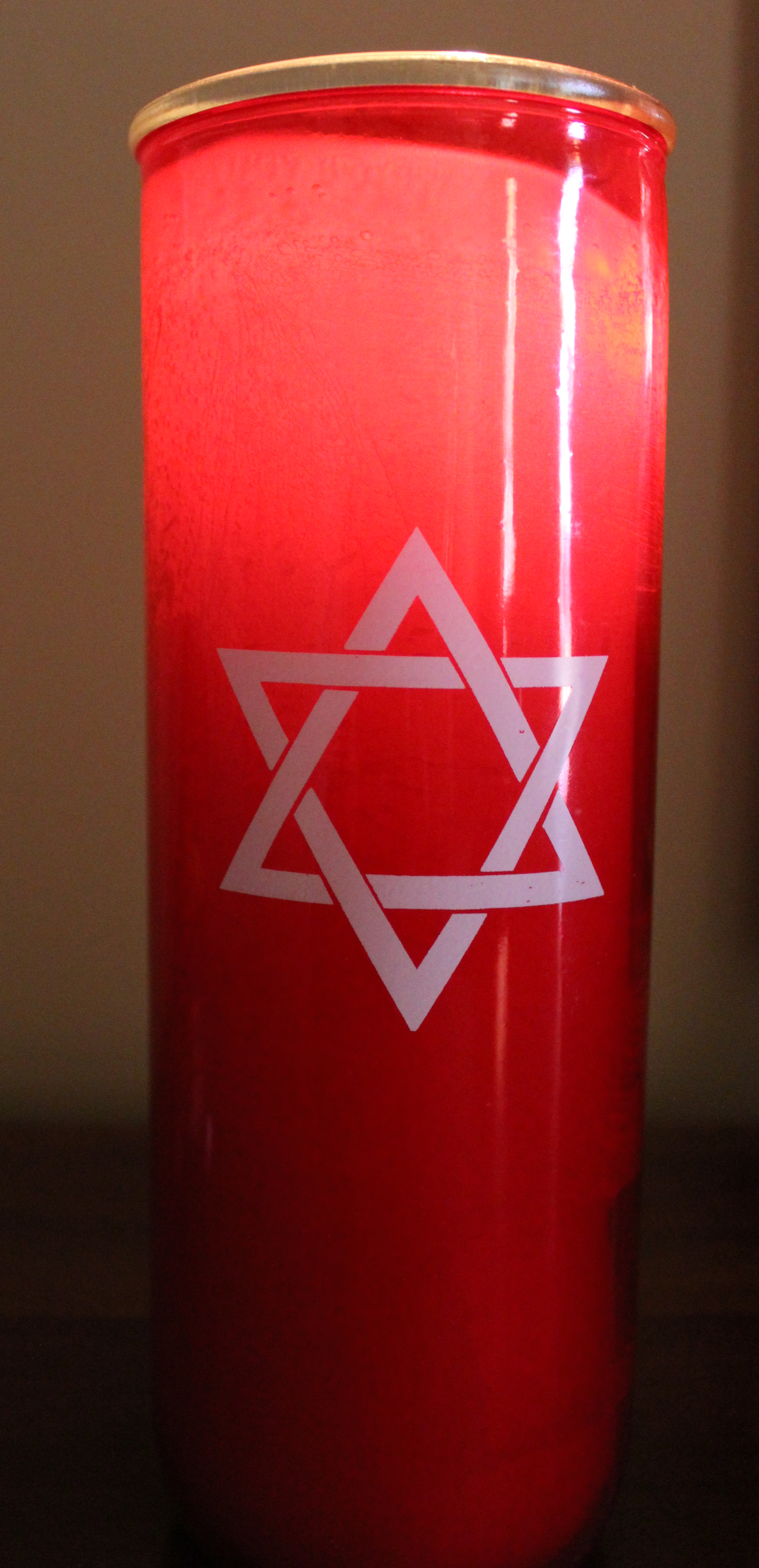
A red shiva candle

Within Judaism, candles are symbolic of special events throughout life. They are lit during major holidays, during Shabbat, and during the process of mourning candles are required to burn for the entirety of shiva. Prior to the death of Rabbi Judah HaNasi in the third century, he instructed that a light should be kept burning. During shiva, the candle represents the deceased. The light is symbolic of the human being, the wick and flame are representative of the body and soul respectively, as well as their connection with one another. Traditionally, candles are required to be made of either oil or paraffin and are not allowed to be electric. The candle is ideally burned in the home of the deceased, but exceptions can be made. Regardless, candles should be in the presence of those observing shiva. During major holidays, the candle may be moved in order to lessen the feeling of mourning and focus on the joyous occasion at hand.

=== Mirrors ===
Individuals who are in mourning, or in a shiva home, are required to cover mirrors from the time an individual dies until the end of shiva. There are several reasons Judaism requires this. The first reason may stem from the idea that man was created in the image of God. In doing so, man acquires the same dignity and value as God. When a creation of God dies, this lessens his image. The death of human beings disrupts the connection between the living man and living God. Since the purpose of mirrors is to reflect such image, they are covered during mourning. A second reason mirrors are covered in Judaism branches from contemplation of one's relationship with God during the death of a loved one. At this time, individuals are instructed to focus on grief and mourning rather than themselves. In order to prevent selfish thoughts, all mirrors are covered within the homes of mourners. A third reason which depicts why mirrors should be covered comes from the law which states that an individual may not stand directly in front of an image or worship one. Therefore, mirrors and pictures are hidden during mourning.

==== Pictures ====
Some have an additional custom to cover all pictures of people. One reason, which is linked to the covering of mirrors (and, by some, all pictures of people too) is that prayer services are held in the house of mourning, if a quorum can be gathered, and "Jewish law clearly states that one may not worship an image or standing directly in front of one .. picture .. mirror."

=== Shoes ===
Leather shoes are not permitted to be worn during the observance of shiva. The reasoning behind this involves a lack of luxury. Without leather shoes, an individual is able to concentrate on mourning and the deeper meaning of life. However, exceptions to this rule include pregnant women and those with ailments of the feet. Aside from those observing shiva or sheloshim, guests and individuals who are not should refrain from wearing leather shoes in the home of mourners as well.

=== Personal grooming ===
Similar to the idea of wearing leather shoes, hygiene and personal grooming fall under the idea of the task being done for pleasure. Such acts are prohibited during the observation of shiva or sheloshim as they are seen as actions done for physical comfort. However, there is a fine line which separates grooming for hygienic reasons and for comfort. Therefore, in order to prevent grooming for comfort individuals who are mourning are instructed to only bathe separate parts of the body, head, and face. On top of this, cold or cool water is recommended. The use of cosmetics is not allowed as this constitutes an act done for comfort and pleasure. However, the exception to this rule is a woman who is a bride, is engaged to be married, or is dating to be married.

=== "Sitting" shiva ===
"Sitting" shiva refers to the act of sitting on low stools during times of mourning. The practice is modelled after the Book of Job, where Job's friends joined him while he was mourning and "sat down with him upon the ground seven days and seven nights". Therefore, originally, individuals who were observing a period of mourning were required to turn couches or beds over and sit on the ground. After time, modifications towards this rule were made. The Halakhah states that an individual is required to sit on low stools or on the floor in order to signify their lack of concern for personal comfort during their time of mourning.

Mourning finds its expression in the sorrow and anguish of the soul and in symbolic, external actions. Different communities have practised different customs during the actual process of "sitting" shiva. Sephardic Jews no longer sit whilst draped in their Tallit, but Yemenite Jews still follow the ancient Jewish custom of sitting seven days whilst draped in a Tallit. The practice is alluded to in the Talmud (Mo'ed Katan), and in the writings of the early rabbinic authorities.

...and he (i.e. the mourner) requires uncovering his head. What is meant by uncovering the head? It is exposing the hair and exposing the head from [being covered] by his hat or his habit, or similar things, and [allowing himself only to be] draped as the draping of the Ishmaelites, as we cite [concerning the leper] (Lev. 13:45): 'And his head shall be bare'…

Among Ashkenazi and Sephardic communities the practice is now obsolete, they adhere to the adjudicators of Jewish law (including the Bayit Chadash, the Ṭurei Zahav, and Siftei Cohen) and who have canceled the custom, writing thus: "And at this time, there is no custom of covering up one's head, so that it may not lead to frivolity. In any case, the hat should be pulled over one's eyes." The only ones who continue to observe the custom are the Jews of Yemen.

There are various customs as to what to say when taking leave of the mourner(s) who is sitting shiva. Ashkenazi Jews recite a traditional phrase that wishes comfort to a mourner by a reassurance that they will eventually reconnect to the person who died, in the same way that God comforts the Jewish people for the destruction of the Second Temple nearly 2,000 years ago through the promise of its eventual rebuilding in the times of the Messiah. The visitor says to the mourner:

הַמָּקוֹם יְנַחֵם אֶתְכֶם בְּתוֹךְ שְׁאָר אֲבֵלֵי צִיּוֹן וִירוּשָׁלָיִם
Hamakom y'nachem etkhem b'tokh sha'ar avelei tziyon viyrushalayim:
"May The Omnipresent comfort you (pl.) among the mourners of Zion and Jerusalem"

=== Place of observance ===
The ideal place to observe shiva is in the home of the deceased individual. If this is not possible, the second best place is in the home of a relative close to the deceased. During the observance of shiva, individuals are generally not permitted to leave the premises. However, there are certain exceptions to this rule, including: not having enough room to house for every individual observing, the loss of another loved one, and the inability to conduct services in the home. If an individual mourning is allowed to leave the home, they must do so without disturbing others and never alone.

== Prayers in the shiva house ==
Praying in the home of a mourner is done in order to demonstrate respect for the grieving individual as well as the deceased. Even as early as 1790, the "Hebra Maarib beZemanah Oheb Shalom" (חברה מעריב בזמנה אוהב שלום) organization was founded in order to provide mourners observing shiva with a minyan. During 1853 in London, the "Hebrath Menachem Abelim Hesed Ve Emeth" organization was founded to accomplish a similar goal. Throughout history, prayers during mourning have been important. However, during shiva, the prayers change slightly.

=== Kaddish ===
During the process of mourning, Kaddish is typically recited. Rather than losing faith in the religion, Jewish traditions require those who have experienced the loss of a loved one to publicly assert their faith in God. This is typically done in front of a minyan. The recitation of Kaddish is done in order to protect the dignity and merit of the individual who died within God's eyes. Judaism believes that prior to a soul's entry into heaven, a maximum of twelve months is required in order for even the worst soul to be purified. Though the entirety of mourning lasts for twelve months, Kaddish is only recited for eleven months so as to not imply the soul required an entire twelve months of purification.

=== Mourner's prayer ===
Traditionally the true mourner's prayer is known as El Malei Rachamim in Ashkenazi literature and Hashkavah in Sephardic literature. Often the mourner's prayer is mistaken for Kaddish. The recitation of the mourner's prayer is done for the soul of an individual who has died. The prayer itself is an appeal for the soul of the deceased to be given proper rest. Typically recitation of this prayer is done at the graveside during burial, during the unveiling of the tombstone, as in the Yizkor services on Jewish holidays. If the recitation is done as an individual commemoration, the prayer contains the name of the individual who died. However, if the recitation is done in the presence of a group, the prayer will contain a description of the individual who died.

=== Minyan during shiva ===
A minyan is traditionally a quorum of ten or more adult men. Often in Conservative, Reconstructionist, or Reform communities, a minyan is composed of a mix of ten or more adult men and women. During shiva, a minyan will gather at the home of those in mourning for services. The services are similar to those held at a synagogue. During shiva, however, certain prayers or verses are either added or omitted. During the days that the Torah is read in a synagogue, it is likewise read at the shiva home. An effort is made by the community to lend a Torah scroll to the mourner for this purpose.

=== Changes to prayer services ===
The following changes are made in the Shacharit (morning) prayer, listed by order in the prayer service:

- Omission of the Priestly Blessing and Hallel on Rosh Chodesh.
- Omission of Tachanun and Nefilat Appayim; similarly, on Monday and Thursday mornings (before Torah reading), Erech Apayim is omitted.
- Omission of Psalm 20
- Omission of Psalms 90
- Addition of Psalm 49 - Redemption of the Soul (Hebrew: למנצח לבני קרח): twice per day: mornings, also evenings (Sfard) or Mincha (Ashkenaz).
- Substitution of Psalm 16 for Psalm 49 on days when Tachanun is omitted
- Omission of Pitum Haketoret.

In addition, the following changes are made in other prayers:

- Omission of Tachanun and Nefilat Appayim from the Mincha service
- Omission of the six Psalms before Friday night services
- Spices are omitted from use in the home of a mourner during Havdalah (the end of shabbat).

== See also ==
- Bereavement in Judaism
- Nine nights
- Shemira
