= Honorifics in Judaism =

Terms of honor in Judaism

There are a number of honorifics in Judaism that vary depending on the status of, and the relationship to, the person to whom one is referring.

== Hasid ==
Ḥasīd is a Jewish honorific, frequently used as a term of exceptional respect in the Talmudic and early medieval periods.

== Rabbi ==
The word Rabbi means "master" and is traditionally used for a religious teacher. In English in particular, it came to be commonly used to refer to any ordained Jewish scholar.

In Israel, among the Haredim, Rabbi can be used colloquially interchangeably with the Yiddish Reb, and is used as a friendly title, similar to calling someone "Sir". Lastly it is also used when referring to the Tannaim.

== Rav ==
"Rav" is the Hebrew word for "master". "Rav" can be used as a generic honorific for a teacher or a personal spiritual guide, similar to Rabbi.

In Modern Hebrew, Rav is used for all rabbis. The word can also be used as a prefix to a profession or title to show high rank or proficiency. For example: רב חובל, rav-sailor, meaning ship captain, or רב אומן, rav-artist, meaning master of a craft or art.

In the Orthodox non-Hebrew speaking world, "Rabbi" is often used as a lesser title, reserving the title "Rav" for more famous rabbis.

When used alone, "the Rav" refers to the posek (Jewish legal decisor) whom the speaker usually consults, or, in Modern-Orthodox communities, to Joseph B. Soloveitchik.

In some communities, "Rav" is also used like "Reb". This is common in Judeo-Czech.

== Rebbe ==
Rebbe may refer to the leader of a Hasidic Judaism movement, a person's main rosh yeshiva (in most institutions, the dean of the academy; at others, such as RIETS, a sort of tenured lecturer) or mentor, or to an elementary school teacher as referred to by his/her students.

In many Hasidic groups the Rebbe gives spiritual guidance; but for questions of halakhah they ask a Rav. This Rav is sometimes referred to as the Rav of the Hasidic group. This position normally is occupied by the Av Beis Din or chief justice, of a Hasidic group. In some Hasidic groups, such as Belz and Satmar, the Rebbe and Rav are concurrent positions. In Hasidic groups with similar organizations, the Admo"r will be referred to by the interchangeable titles. In those groups where the positions are divided, they will not. For example, the Satmar Rav and the Satmar Rebbe are the same person. The Breslover Rebbe and the Breslover Rav are not.

== Tzadik ==
Tzadik is a honorific title in Judaism given to people considered righteous, such as biblical figures and later spiritual masters. When applied to a righteous woman, the term is inflected as tzadeket.

== Mar ==
Mar (מר, Aramaic for "master") was a high honorific for teachers and Exilarchs in the Talmudic and Geonic periods, but Modern Hebrew adopted it as "Mr.".

=== Mar-Rav ===
The Geonim used the double title "Mar-Rav" for heads of Talmudic academies.

=== Maran ===
A synonymous variant (cf. Rabbi, Rabban) used for modern Sephardic rabbis.

=== Marana ===
The possessive form "our master," a variant preferred by the Rishonim and still in use today. Often combined with "rabbi" for Marana veRabbana.

== Gaon ==
Originally a formal title for one of the geonim. Since the medieval period given to any great rabbi. In Modern Hebrew reinterpreted as secular "genius".

== Other honorifics ==
Other honorifics include Admo"r, K'vod K'dushas, Shlit"a and Shy'.

=== Moreh / Morah ===
Hebrew honorific for a teacher. Morah is feminine, and can be used for any teacher; Moreh is masculine, and typically reserved for non-Judaics subjects (where Rav or Rabbi is used irrespective of ordination status). However, a male rabbi may also be called by the homophone Mara d'Atra, which is Aramaic for "master of the place".

=== Admor ===
"Admor" is a modern acronym for "Adonainu, Morainu, VeRabbeinu", a phrase meaning "Our Master, Our Teacher, and Our Rabbi". This is an honorific title given to scholarly leaders of a Jewish community, exclusively to Hasidic rebbes. In writing, this title is placed before the name, as in "Admor of Pinsk" or "R' (stands for Rabbi, Rabbeinu, Rav, or Reb) Ploni Almoni, Admor of Redomsk".

=== Gadol Hador ===
This term is used to point to a leader of the generation, for example, Aharon Yehuda Leib Shteinman was considered one until his death in 2017.

=== Hakham ===
"Hakham" (wise one) is an alternate title for rabbis (especially Sephardic ones) but also includes some sages (such as ben Zoma and ben Azzai) who were never formally ordained. It is also the primary title of Karaite spiritual leaders, perhaps on the Sephardic model but also to emphasize their role as advisors rather than authorities.

=== K'vod K'dushat ===
"K'vod K'dushat", meaning "The honor of [his] holiness". This title is usually placed before the name. It is found as early as in the 1531 edition of the Arukh.

=== Maskil ===
The word "Maskil" מַשְׂכִּיל or "ha-maskil" indicates a scholar or an "enlightened man", used before the name. It was also used for activists in the Haskalah movement of the 18th and 19th centuries.

=== Qess ===
The Beta Israel community of Ethiopia refers to its spiritual leaders as Qessoch ቄሶች, sometimes translated as "pastors" or "sages". A single sage would be a Qess ቄስ. Qessoch are also known as kahənat ካሀንት, which literally translates to "priests". Unlike the Hebrew kohen, an Ethiopian kahən is not necessarily of Aaronide descent.

=== Shlit"a ===
Shlit"a (שליט"א SHLYT"A), originally a medieval Aramaic honorific שליטא shlita meaning "the master", (Note: In Aramaic documents from Egypt, for example, the standard formula is "[Name] son of [Name], master here" or "[Name] son of [Name], master in the house of [Name]" and this root and use is common in the bible and Talmud. However, this term never appears in genuine ancient or Talmudic texts as an independent noun, instead always in the form "master of . . ." and was first commonly used as such by the Zohar.) reached widespread European adoption in the sixteenth century (along with Hebrew שליט shalit). (Note: See Azariah de Rossi's Meor Einayim, Moshe Isserles's HaMapah, and Joel Sirkis's responsa for early examples. Isserles himself was often called "shalit" or "shlita" by Ashkenazic contemporaries, in the original sense of "the master".) By the start of the seventeenth century, following the suggestion of Moses Isserles, it was reinterpreted as an acronym for Sheyikhye Le'orech Yamim Tovim Amen, "May he live a good long life, Amen", a euphemism for "the one with that name who is still alive". (Note: Donati and other early lexicographers confirm this use.) Having reverted to the original meaning, it is now placed after the name of any revered rabbi, especially one with whom the speaker has a personal connection, but the gershayim (indicating an acronym) is still often used.

Examples:

- Note that the Rebbe shlita has instructed and requested all of Bar Mitzvah age and older not to chat when wearing tefillin.
- HaGaon HaRav Shmuel Yaakov Borenstein, Shlita, To Address Acheinu Parlor Meeting In Flatbush. (Also note the use of HaGaon, meaning "The exalted one", and HaRav, a variation on Rav above where Ha means "The".)

=== Shy' ===
"Shy'" is short for "Sheyikhye", meaning "May he live". Like Shlit"a when intended as an acronym, Shy' is used to disambiguate a living person from another of the same name.

== HaLevi ==
In reference to Levite descent. Used preceding surname.

When calling a man to read the Levite (second) portion of the Torah service, he is called by his Hebrew name, followed by "HaLevi" ("the Levite"). For example, a person of Levite descent named Joshua Rosenberg (Hebrew given name "Yehoshua"), whose father's given name is/was Abraham (Hebrew given name "Avraham"), would be called to the Torah as "Yehoshua ben Avraham, HaLevi.”

== HaKohen ==
In reference to priestly descent. Used preceding surname.

When calling a man to read the priestly (first) portion of the Torah service, he is called by his Hebrew name, followed by "HaKohen" ("the priest"). For example, a person of priestly descent named Aaron Katz (Hebrew given name "Ahron"), whose father's given name is/was Jacob (Hebrew given name "Yakov"), would be called to the Torah as "Ahron ben Yakov, HaKohen").

== See also ==
- Honorifics for the dead in Judaism
