= Psalm 49 =

Biblical psalm

- "Hear this, all ye people"
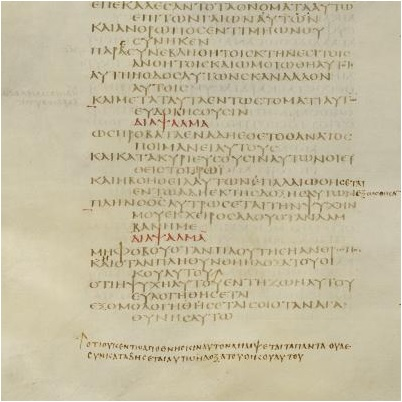
- The Greek text of Psalm 49:11–18 in the fragment of folio 100 verso of Codex Sinaiticus (4th century)
- Other name: Psalm 48; "Audite haec omnes gentes"
- Language: Hebrew (original)

Psalm 49
- ← Psalm 48 Psalm 50 →
- Book: Book of Psalms
- Hebrew Bible part: Ketuvim
- Order in the Hebrew part: 1
- Category: Sifrei Emet
- Christian Bible part: Old Testament
- Order in the Christian part: 19

Psalm 49 is the 49th psalm of the Book of Psalms, beginning in English in the King James Version: "Hear this, all ye people; give ear, all ye inhabitants of the world". In the slightly different numbering system used in the Greek Septuagint version of the bible, and generally in its Latin translations, this psalm is Psalm 48. In the Vulgate, it begins "Audite haec omnes gentes". The psalm is attributed to the sons of Korah and is closely connected with the "Wisdom" or religious philosophy of ancient Israel.

The psalm forms a regular part of Jewish, Catholic, Lutheran, Anglican and other Protestant liturgies, and has been set to music.

== Commentary ==
In Jewish tradition the psalm is attributed to the sons of Korah after recognizing their father's greed for wealth as the root of his downfall, and to teach that the purpose of one's life on earth is to enhance his or her spiritual development and to prepare for the world to come.

Alexander Kirkpatrick, in the Cambridge Bible for Schools and Colleges commentary, notes that this Psalm addresses “all peoples” with a theme of common interest to all humanity: is not wealth, after all, the master-force in the world? Must not the poor tremble before its power and pay court to its splendour? In reply, "the Psalmist expresses his own faith that righteousness will be finally triumphant".

== Uses ==
=== Judaism ===
- Psalm 49 is recited on the day of Parshat Shekalim.
- It is also recited following Shacharit and Maariv in a house of mourning.
- Verse 6 is found in the Foundation of Repentance, recited on the eve of Rosh Hashanah.

=== Book of Common Prayer ===
In the Church of England's Book of Common Prayer, this psalm is appointed to be read on the evening of the ninth day of the month.

== Musical settings ==
Heinrich Schütz wrote a setting of a paraphrase of Psalm 49 in German, "Hört zu ihr Völker in gemein", SWV 146, for the Becker Psalter, published first in 1628.

== Text ==
The following table shows the Hebrew text of the Psalm with vowels, alongside the Koine Greek text in the Septuagint and the English translation from the King James Version. Note that the meaning can slightly differ between these versions, as the Septuagint and the Masoretic Text come from different textual traditions. (Note: A 1917 translation directly from Hebrew to English by the Jewish Publication Society can be found here or here, and an 1844 translation directly from the Septuagint by L. C. L. Brenton can be found here. Both translations are in the public domain.) In the Septuagint, this psalm is numbered Psalm 48.

#	Hebrew	English	Greek
(Note: In the Jewish verse numbering, the ascription of this psalm is verse 1, and the rest of the psalm begins from verse 2. However, the Christian verse numbering does not count the ascription as a separate verse.)	לַמְנַצֵּ֬חַ ׀ לִבְנֵי־קֹ֬רַח מִזְמֽוֹר׃	(To the chief Musician, A Psalm for the sons of Korah.)	Εἰς τὸ τέλος· τοῖς υἱοῖς Κορὲ ψαλμός. -
1	שִׁמְעוּ־זֹ֭את כׇּל־הָעַמִּ֑ים הַ֝אֲזִ֗ינוּ כׇּל־יֹ֥שְׁבֵי חָֽלֶד׃	Hear this, all ye people; give ear, all ye inhabitants of the world:	ΑΚΟΥΣΑΤΕ ταῦτα, πάντα τὰ ἔθνη, ἐνωτίσασθε πάντες οἱ κατοικοῦντες τὴν οἰκουμένην,
2	גַּם־בְּנֵ֣י אָ֭דָם גַּם־בְּנֵי־אִ֑ישׁ יַ֝֗חַד עָשִׁ֥יר וְאֶבְיֽוֹן׃	Both low and high, rich and poor, together.	οἵ τε γηγενεῖς καὶ οἱ υἱοὶ τῶν ἀνθρώπων, ἐπὶ τὸ αὐτὸ πλούσιος καὶ πένης.
3	פִּ֭י יְדַבֵּ֣ר חׇכְמ֑וֹת וְהָג֖וּת לִבִּ֣י תְבוּנֽוֹת׃	My mouth shall speak of wisdom; and the meditation of my heart shall be of understanding.	τὸ στόμα μου λαλήσει σοφίαν καὶ ἡ μελέτη τῆς καρδίας μου σύνεσιν·
4	אַטֶּ֣ה לְמָשָׁ֣ל אׇזְנִ֑י אֶפְתַּ֥ח בְּ֝כִנּ֗וֹר חִידָתִֽי׃	I will incline mine ear to a parable: I will open my dark saying upon the harp.	κλινῶ εἰς παραβολὴν τὸ οὖς μου, ἀνοίξω ἐν ψαλτηρίῳ τὸ πρόβλημά μου.
5	לָ֣מָּה אִ֭ירָא בִּ֣ימֵי רָ֑ע עֲוֺ֖ן עֲקֵבַ֣י יְסוּבֵּֽנִי׃	Wherefore should I fear in the days of evil, when the iniquity of my heels shall compass me about?	ἱνατί φοβοῦμαι ἐν ἡμέρᾳ πονηρᾷ; ἡ ἀνομία τῆς πτέρνης μου κυκλώσει με.
6	הַבֹּטְחִ֥ים עַל־חֵילָ֑ם וּבְרֹ֥ב עׇ֝שְׁרָ֗ם יִתְהַלָּֽלוּ׃	They that trust in their wealth, and boast themselves in the multitude of their riches;	οἱ πεποιθότες ἐπὶ τῇ δυνάμει αὐτῶν καὶ ἐπὶ τῷ πλήθει τοῦ πλούτου αὐτῶν καυχώμενοι,
7	אָ֗ח לֹא־פָדֹ֣ה יִפְדֶּ֣ה אִ֑ישׁ לֹא־יִתֵּ֖ן לֵאלֹהִ֣ים כׇּפְרֽוֹ׃	None of them can by any means redeem his brother, nor give to God a ransom for him:	ἀδελφὸς οὐ λυτροῦται, λυτρώσεται ἄνθρωπος; οὐ δώσει τῷ Θεῷ ἐξίλασμα ἑαυτοῦ
8	וְ֭יֵקַר פִּדְי֥וֹן נַפְשָׁ֗ם וְחָדַ֥ל לְעוֹלָֽם׃	(For the redemption of their soul is precious, and it ceaseth for ever:)	καὶ τὴν τιμὴν τῆς λυτρώσεως τῆς ψυχῆς αὐτοῦ. καὶ ἐκοπίασεν εἰς τὸν αἰῶνα
9	וִיחִי־ע֥וֹד לָנֶ֑צַח לֹ֖א יִרְאֶ֣ה הַשָּֽׁחַת׃	That he should still live for ever, and not see corruption.	καὶ ζήσεται εἰς τέλος· οὐκ ὄψεται καταφθοράν,
10	כִּ֤י יִרְאֶ֨ה ׀ חֲכָ֘מִ֤ים יָמ֗וּתוּ יַ֤חַד כְּסִ֣יל וָבַ֣עַר יֹאבֵ֑דוּ וְעָזְב֖וּ לַאֲחֵרִ֣ים חֵילָֽם׃	For he seeth that wise men die, likewise the fool and the brutish person perish, and leave their wealth to others.	ὅταν ἴδῃ σοφοὺς ἀποθνήσκοντας. ἐπὶ τὸ αὐτὸ ἄφρων καὶ ἄνους ἀπολοῦνται καὶ καταλείψουσιν ἀλλοτρίοις τὸν πλοῦτον αὐτῶν,
11	קִרְבָּ֤ם בָּתֵּ֨ימוֹ ׀ לְֽעוֹלָ֗ם מִ֭שְׁכְּנֹתָם לְד֣וֹר וָדֹ֑ר קָרְא֥וּ בִ֝שְׁמוֹתָ֗ם עֲלֵ֣י אֲדָמֽוֹת׃	Their inward thought is, that their houses shall continue for ever, and their dwelling places to all generations; they call their lands after their own names.	καὶ οἱ τάφοι αὐτῶν οἰκίαι αὐτῶν εἰς τὸν αἰῶνα, σκηνώματα αὐτῶν εἰς γενεὰν καὶ γενεάν. ἐπεκαλέσαντο τὰ ὀνόματα αὐτῶν ἐπὶ τῶν γαιῶν αὐτῶν.
12	וְאָדָ֣ם בִּ֭יקָר בַּל־יָלִ֑ין נִמְשַׁ֖ל כַּבְּהֵמ֣וֹת נִדְמֽוּ׃	Nevertheless man being in honour abideth not: he is like the beasts that perish.	καὶ ἄνθρωπος ἐν τιμῇ ὢν οὐ συνῆκε, παρασυνεβλήθη τοῖς κτήνεσι τοῖς ἀνοήτοις καὶ ὡμοιώθη αὐτοῖς.
13	זֶ֣ה דַ֭רְכָּם כֵּ֣סֶל לָ֑מוֹ וְאַחֲרֵיהֶ֓ם ׀ בְּפִיהֶ֖ם יִרְצ֣וּ סֶֽלָה׃	This their way is their folly: yet their posterity approve their sayings. Selah.	αὕτη ἡ ὁδὸς αὐτῶν σκάνδαλον αὐτοῖς, καὶ μετὰ ταῦτα ἐν τῷ στόματι αὐτῶν εὐδοκήσουσι. (διάψαλμα).
14	כַּצֹּ֤אן ׀ לִ֥שְׁא֣וֹל שַׁתּוּ֮ מָ֤וֶת יִ֫רְעֵ֥ם וַיִּרְדּ֘וּ בָ֤ם יְשָׁרִ֨ים ׀ לַבֹּ֗קֶר (וצירם) [וְ֭צוּרָם] לְבַלּ֥וֹת שְׁא֗וֹל מִזְּבֻ֥ל לֽוֹ׃	Like sheep they are laid in the grave; death shall feed on them; and the upright shall have dominion over them in the morning; and their beauty shall consume in the grave from their dwelling.	ὡς πρόβατα ἐν ᾅδῃ ἔθεντο, θάνατος ποιμανεῖ αὐτούς· καὶ κατακυριεύσουσιν αὐτῶν οἱ εὐθεῖς τὸ πρωΐ, καὶ ἡ βοήθεια αὐτῶν παλαιωθήσεται ἐν τῷ ᾅδῃ, ἐκ τῆς δόξης αὐτῶν ἐξώσθησαν.
15	אַךְ־אֱלֹהִ֗ים יִפְדֶּ֣ה נַ֭פְשִׁי מִֽיַּד־שְׁא֑וֹל כִּ֖י יִקָּחֵ֣נִי סֶֽלָה׃	But God will redeem my soul from the power of the grave: for he shall receive me. Selah.	πλὴν ὁ Θεὸς λυτρώσεται τὴν ψυχήν μου ἐκ χειρὸς ᾅδου, ὅταν λαμβάνῃ με. (διάψαλμα).
16	אַל־תִּ֭ירָא כִּֽי־יַעֲשִׁ֣ר אִ֑ישׁ כִּי־יִ֝רְבֶּ֗ה כְּב֣וֹד בֵּיתֽוֹ׃	Be not thou afraid when one is made rich, when the glory of his house is increased;	μὴ φοβοῦ, ὅταν πλουτήσῃ ἄνθρωπος καὶ ὅταν πληθυνθῇ ἡ δόξα τοῦ οἴκου αὐτοῦ·
17	כִּ֤י לֹ֣א בְ֭מוֹתוֹ יִקַּ֣ח הַכֹּ֑ל לֹֽא־יֵרֵ֖ד אַחֲרָ֣יו כְּבוֹדֽוֹ׃	For when he dieth he shall carry nothing away: his glory shall not descend after him.	ὅτι οὐκ ἐν τῷ ἀποθνήσκειν αὐτὸν λήψεται τὰ πάντα, οὐδὲ συγκαταβήσεται αὐτῷ ἡ δόξα αὐτοῦ.
18	כִּֽי־נַ֭פְשׁוֹ בְּחַיָּ֣יו יְבָרֵ֑ךְ וְ֝יוֹדֻ֗ךָ כִּי־תֵיטִ֥יב לָֽךְ׃	Though while he lived he blessed his soul: and men will praise thee, when thou doest well to thyself.	ὅτι ἡ ψυχὴ αὐτοῦ ἐν τῇ ζωῇ αὐτοῦ εὐλογηθήσεται· ἐξομολογήσεταί σοι, ὅταν ἀγαθύνῃς αὐτῷ.
19	תָּ֭בוֹא עַד־דּ֣וֹר אֲבוֹתָ֑יו עַד־נֵ֝֗צַח לֹ֣א יִרְאוּ־אֽוֹר׃	He shall go to the generation of his fathers; they shall never see light.	εἰσελεύσεται ἕως γενεᾶς πατέρων αὐτοῦ, ἕως αἰῶνος οὐκ ὄψεται φῶς.
20	אָדָ֣ם בִּ֭יקָר וְלֹ֣א יָבִ֑ין נִמְשַׁ֖ל כַּבְּהֵמ֣וֹת נִדְמֽוּ׃	Man that is in honour, and understandeth not, is like the beasts that perish.	καὶ ἄνθρωπος ἐν τιμῇ ὢν οὐ συνῆκε, παρασυνεβλήθη τοῖς κτήνεσι τοῖς ἀνοήτοις καὶ ὡμοιώθη αὐτοῖς.
