= Keriah =

Jewish mourning practice

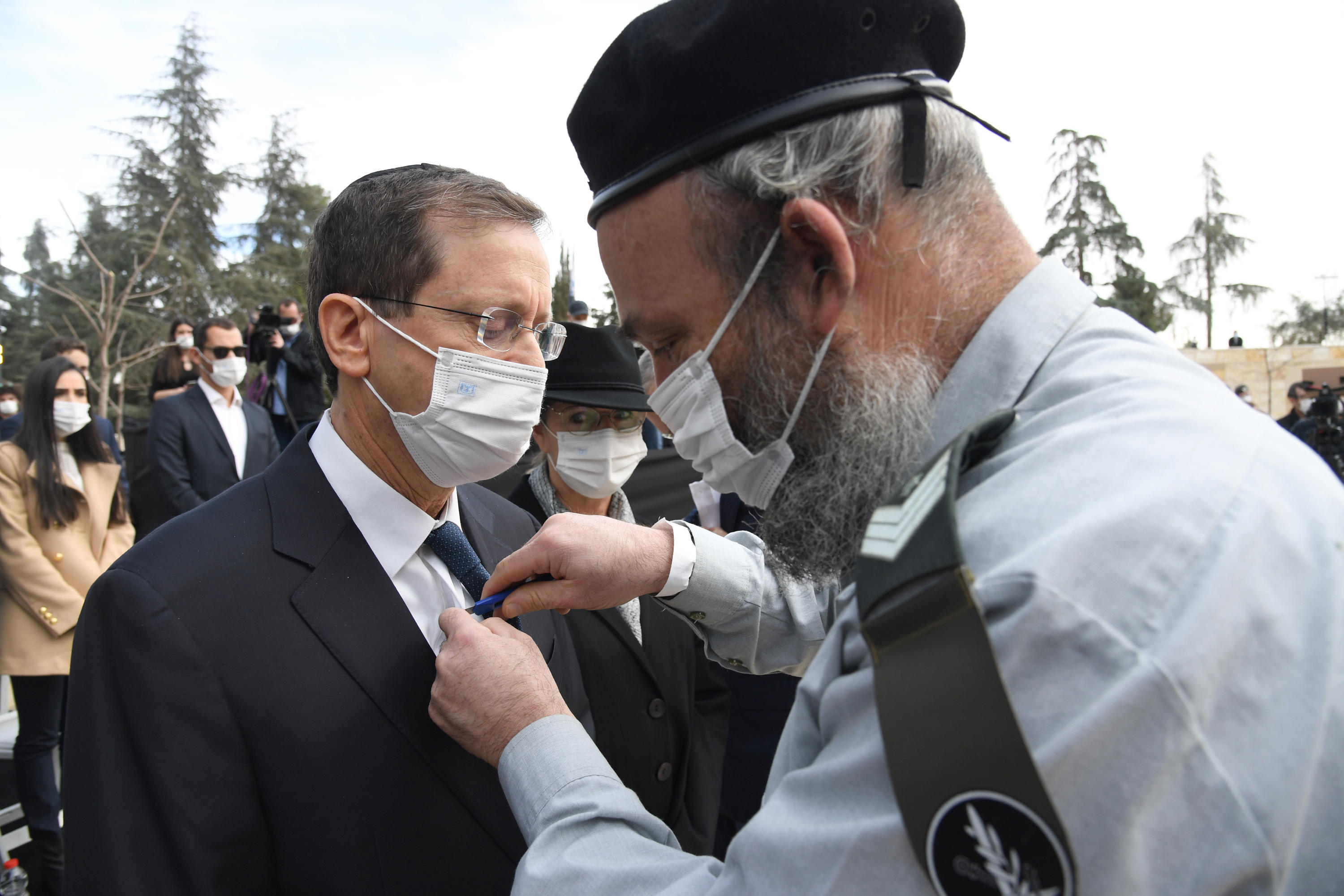
Isaac Herzog at the funeral ceremony of Aura Herzog, January 2022

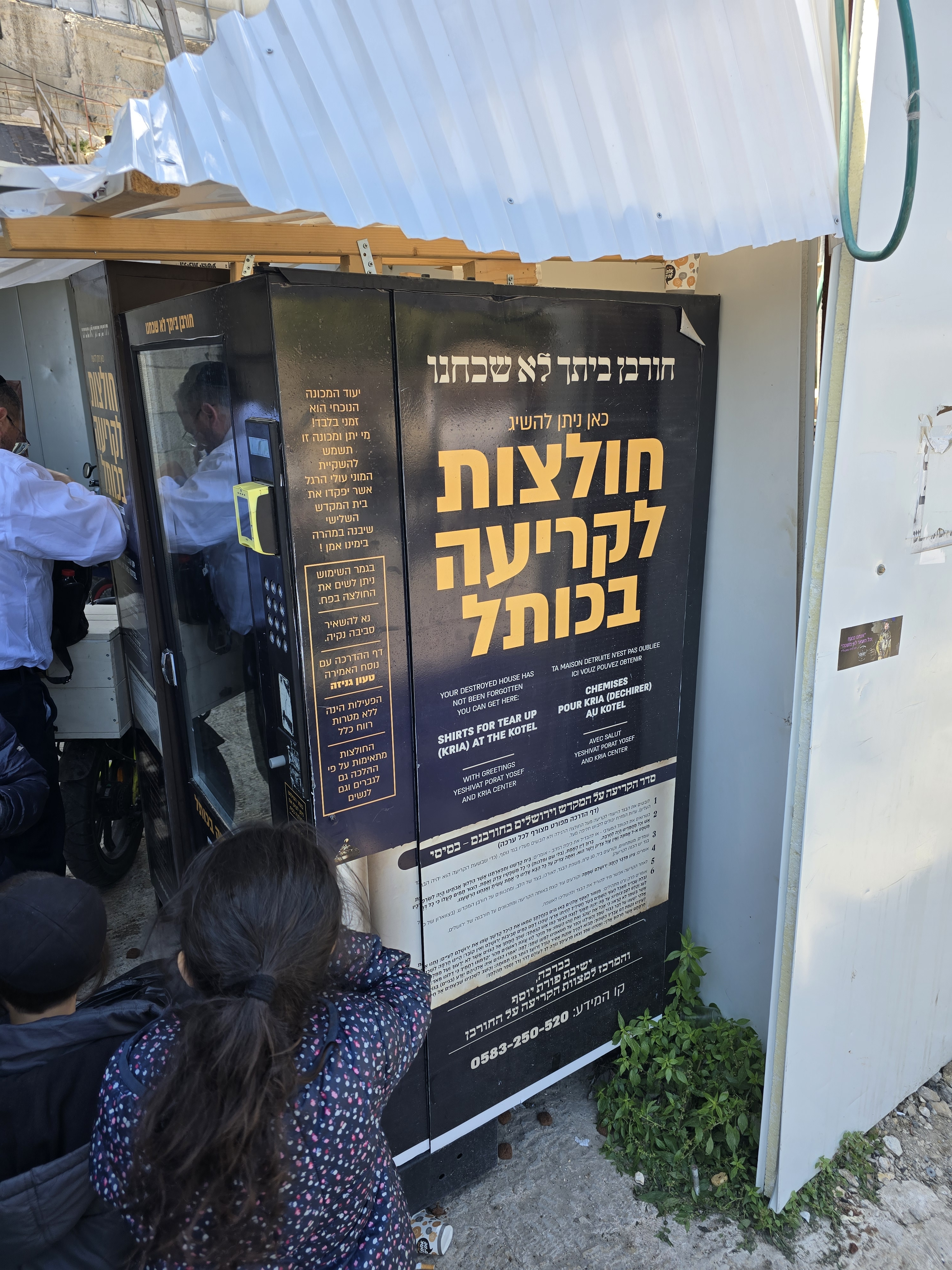
A vending machine that sells basic T-shirts. These are intended for visitors who need a garment to perform the ritual of keriah upon witnessing the site.

Keriah (Hebrew: קְרִיעָה, lit. 'tearing'; often translated as 'rending of garments') is ritual tearing of one’s clothes as a sign of mourning or grief. This practice originated in the ancient Near East and continues in various cultures to the present day. The act of keriah is mentioned numerous times in the Hebrew Bible (Tanakh), typically performed as an expression of grief upon the death of a close relative, but also occasionally in response to other disastrous or profoundly disturbing news.

In Jewish law (Halakha), keriah is a mandated ritual within the laws of mourning (Dinei Aveilut). An individual is obligated to perform keriah upon learning of the death of one of the seven close relatives for whom the Shiva (the formal seven-day mourning period) must be observed: father, mother, brother, sister, son, daughter, or spouse. Additionally, Halakha requires keriah in other specific circumstances.

== Origin ==
The first described instance of keriah in the Torah appears with Reuben, who tore his garments upon discovering that Joseph was missing from the pit. Subsequently, his father Jacob also performed keriah as part of his mourning upon hearing the (false) news of Joseph's death: "Then Jacob tore his garments, put sackcloth on his loins, and mourned his son many days".

The act of keriah is mentioned approximately 35 times in the Hebrew Bible. While most instances are reactions to the death of a close relative, it is also performed in response to other calamities or transgressions. Examples include:

- Tamar tearing her ornamented robe after being raped by her half-brother Amnon.
- Joshua and Caleb tearing their clothes in distress after the negative report of the Ten Spies regarding the Land of Canaan.
- King Hezekiah rending his garments upon hearing the blasphemous threats of the Assyrian official Rabshakeh against Jerusalem and God.

Often, the act of keriah was accompanied by other ancient mourning customs, such as wearing sackcloth, putting dust or ashes on one's head, and fasting.

== In halakha ==
The obligation in Jewish law (halakha) for mourners to perform keriah is derived inferentially from the instruction given to Aaron and his surviving sons following the deaths of Nadab and Abihu: "Do not bare your heads and do not rend your clothes, lest you die...". From this specific prohibition applied to the priests officiating at that moment, the Sages deduced that other mourners are indeed obligated to perform keriah for their close relatives. However, according to most Rishonim, the obligation of keriah is generally considered a Rabbinic enactment (takkanat chachamim) rather than a direct commandment from the Torah.

The keriah ritual has specific requirements:

- It must be performed while standing.
- The tear should be at least one tefach (a handbreadth, approximately 8–10 cm or 3–4 inches) in length.
- Tearing excessively beyond what is required is discouraged, as the Sages stated it could violate the prohibition of wanton destruction (bal tashchit).
- An exception applies when mourning a parent (father or mother), for whom one must make a larger tear, symbolically described as tearing "until revealing the heart" (meaning tearing further down over the chest area, near the heart).
- The tear is made on the uppermost garment being worn at the time.
- It must be made on the front of the garment, near the neckline.
- The tear must be made vertically (from the neckline downwards), not horizontally.

According to the primary halakha (me'ikar hadin), the ideal time for keriah is at the moment of death (yetziat ha'neshamah – 'the departure of the soul'). However, common practice is often to perform it later. Sometimes it is done just before the body is removed from the home for burial, but very frequently it is performed at the cemetery at the commencement of the funeral service. Often, a member of the chevra kadisha or the officiating rabbi will assist the mourners in performing keriah correctly (a woman assists female mourners to ensure privacy).

Beyond the seven close relatives, halakha technically requires anyone present at the exact moment of a Jew's death to perform keriah as well, although it is common practice nowadays to be lenient regarding this requirement for bystanders.

The Talmud also mandates performing keriah upon hearing of the death of a prominent Torah scholar (talmid chacham). However, Rabbi Moses Isserles (the Rema, a key codifier of Ashkenazi practice) notes that the prevailing custom became more lenient, generally restricting this obligation to performing keriah only for one's primary, most significant Torah teacher (rabbo muvhak).

== Sources ==
- Singer, Isidore; Adler, Cyrus (1901). "Mourning Habit and Keri'ah". The Jewish Encyclopedia: A Descriptive Record of the History, Religion, Literature, and Customs of the Jewish People from the Earliest Times. Ktav Publishing House. p. 102.
