= Lychnapsia =

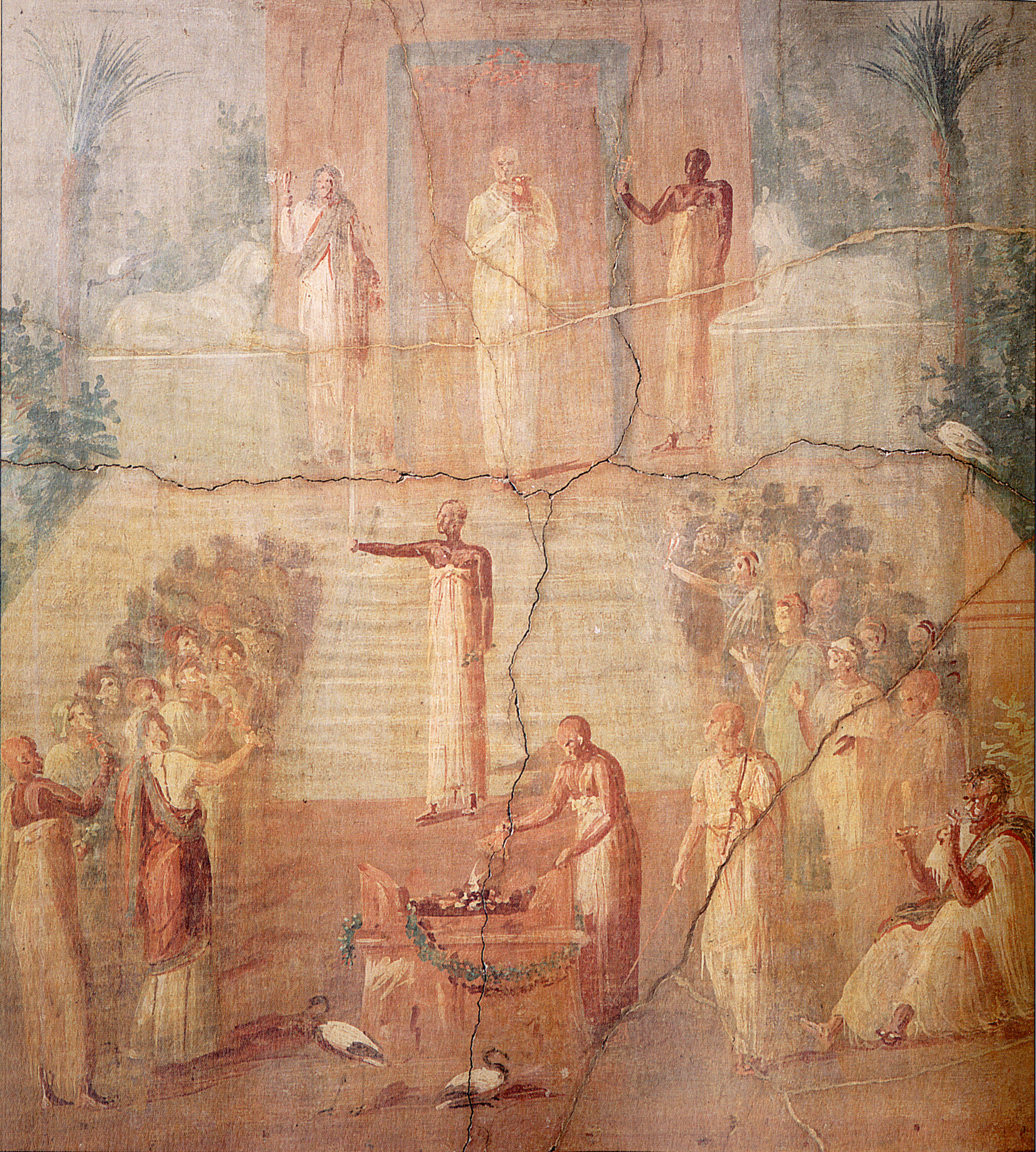
Roman wall painting from Herculaneum depicting an Isiac ritual: the priest at the foot of the steps (center) extends a tall white candle in his right hand

In the Roman Empire, the Lychnapsia was a festival of lamps on August 12, widely regarded by scholars as having been held in honor of Isis. It was thus one of several official Roman holidays and observances that publicly linked the cult of Isis with Imperial cult. It is thought to be a Roman adaptation of Egyptian religious ceremonies celebrating the birthday of Isis. By the 4th century, Isiac cult was thoroughly integrated into traditional Roman religious practice, but evidence that Isis was honored by the Lychnapsia is indirect, and lychnapsia is a general word in Greek for festive lamp-lighting. In the 5th century, lychnapsia could be synonymous with lychnikon (lamp-lighting at vespers) as a Christian liturgical office.

== On the calendar ==
Numerous lamp festivals were celebrated in Egypt. The most important of these began during the five epagomenal days at the end of the year, following Mesore (Coptic Mesori), the twelfth and last month of the Egyptian calendar that corresponded roughly to the Roman month of Augustus. The Egyptian calendar divided a year of 360 days into 12 equal months of 30 days each, with the year-end insertion of five days sometimes called "lamp days" to synch with the solar year. The birthday of Isis was celebrated on the fourth epagomenal day.

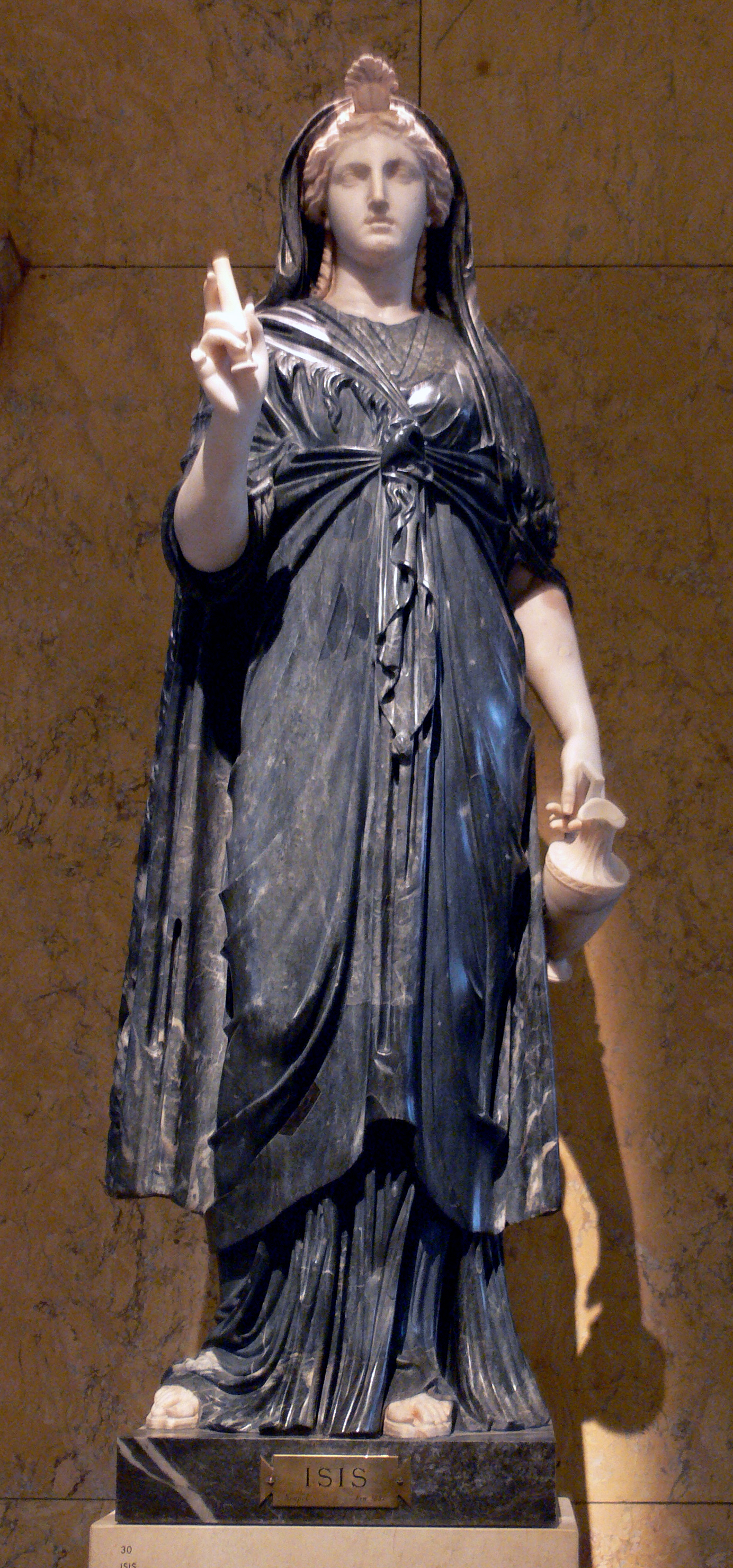
Romanized Isis (c. 100–150 AD, black and white marble)

The 12th of August on the Julian calendar corresponds to the 19th of Mesore on the Alexandrian calendar. On or around the 18th of Mesore, the Egyptians held a Nile festival named variously as Wafa El-Nil, Jabr El-Khalig, or Fath El-Khalig ("The Marriage of the Nile" in European scholarship), a nocturnally illuminated celebration when a clay statue called the Bride of the Nile (Arousat El-Nil) was deposited in the river.

The Calendar of Philocalus (354 AD) places the Roman Lychnapsia pridie Idus Augustas, the day before the Ides of August, a month when the Ides fell on the 13th. It began to be celebrated after the mid-1st century AD. Mommsen conjectured that it was introduced around 36–39 AD along with the longer Roman Isiac festival held October 28 through November 3. During this period, the fourth epagomenal day would have coincided with August 12 on the Roman calendar. According to this theory, the Lychnapsia would have been a Roman celebration of the dies natalis ("birthday") of Isis.

The birthday of Horus also was celebrated with a lamp festival, according to a decree that marked the Battle of Raphia in 217 BC. A major festival of lights occurred for the rites of Osiris on the 22nd day of the month of Khoiak (December), when 365 lamps were lit.

== Cultural context ==
Greek awareness of Egyptian lamp-lighting festivals is recorded as early as Herodotus (5th century BC), who mentions the Festival of Lanterns at Sais held for Neith. Illumination by torches or lamps had a long tradition in Greek and Roman religion, under names such as lampadeia and phosphoreia in Greek. Torches were particularly associated with the Eleusinian Mysteries and the cult of Demeter (Roman Ceres), with whose functions Isis was identified through interpretatio graeca. At Delos, women bearing lamps carried out rituals involving Isis.

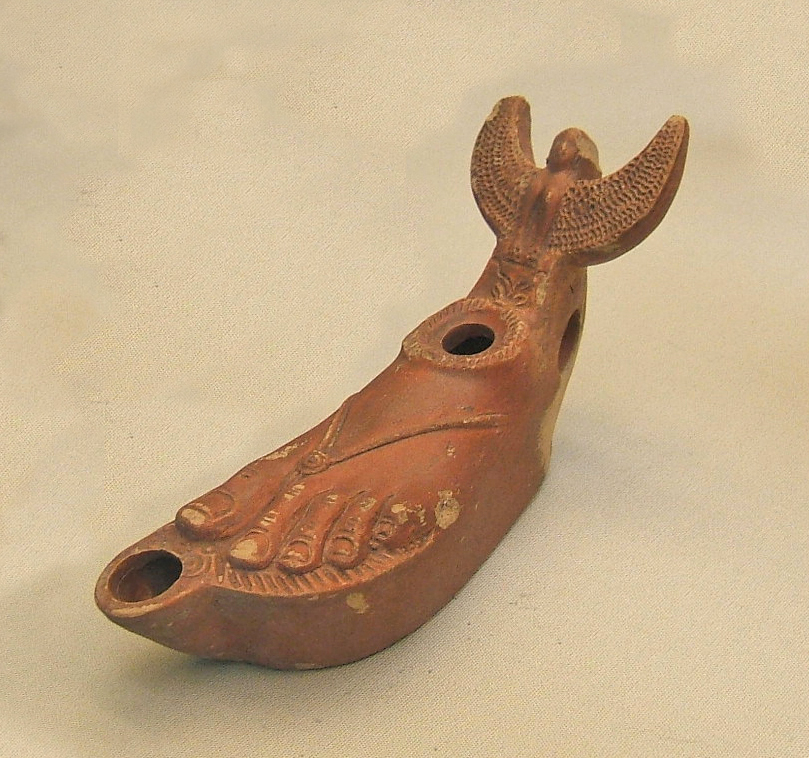
Terracotta lamp in the shape of a foot, with a sphinx or siren as the handle

Lamps or candelabra could be votive offerings, and temple buildings were illuminated with chandeliers or lamp trees. At Tarentum in southern Italy (Magna Graecia), the Sicilian tyrannos Dionysus II dedicated a lampstand that held one light for each day of the year. Doorways were lit by lamps for both private celebrations and public holidays.

The general practice of lychnapsia was part of rites for the care of the dead, in which context the lamp flames might be considered "ensouled", embodying or perpetuating the soul and vulnerable to extinguishing. The lights of the Egyptian epagomenal days were placed for the dead in tombs. Candles or lamps were particularly associated with Roman household and ancestor cult (Lares, Penates, the Genius), as well as with Jupiter, Tutela, Saturn, Mercury, and Aesculapius. Lamps were an integral part of Imperial cult. At a joint temple of Tiberius and Dionysus in Teos, hymns were sung to the god, and a priest of Tiberius offered incense and libations and lit lamps at the opening and closing of daily rites.

The Lychnapsia of August 12 may have resembled rites held at the temple of Jupiter Capitolinus at Arsinoe in Egypt. A papyrus that records the festival budget includes oil for lighting the lamps, along with line items for polishing and garlanding statues and other expenses for the procession and temple maintenance. In the Imperial era, nocturnal sacrifices for the birthday of Isis were attended by Greek men of the highest social status, as mentioned in a letter from the senator Herodes Atticus (101–177 AD) to the Alexandrian grammarian Apollonius Dyscolus.

Lychnapsia as a ritualized lighting of lamps was an "essential feature" of cult surrounding the Theos Hypsistos ("Highest God"), which exhibited strongly monotheistic tendencies among gentiles influenced by the concept of God in Judaism. Numerous bronze lamp-hangers from the Roman East, dating to the 3rd century AD, have been identified as belonging to the cult of Theos Hypsistos, for whom the traditional Greco-Roman gods such as Apollo acted as angeloi (messengers).

== Christian antiquity ==
The Church Father Tertullian (died c. 225) advised Christians not to participate in lamp-lighting on officially sanctioned days that had a religious character. In 392, lamp-lighting was among the cultic acts prohibited by the Christian emperor Theodosius I in the series of laws that banned religious practices other than Christianity.

By the 5th century, ritualistic lamp- and candle-lighting had been adopted as Christian practices. Lamps were burned at the statue of Constantine, the first emperor to convert to Christianity, and the emperor's image is framed by lighted candles in the 5th-century Notitia Dignitatum. Because Arians met by night, mainstream Christians who regarded Arianism as heresy distinguished themselves by illumination. The empress Aelia Eudoxia sponsored processions and distributed silver cruciform candleholders to participants. The condemnation and deposal of Nestorius was celebrated at Ephesus with organized rejoicing explicitly called a lychnapsia: the bishops were accompanied by a procession of citizens carrying lights, and women swinging censers led the way. When the Visigothic king Athaulf was killed, celebrations at Constantinople included a lychnapsia, followed the next day by circus races.

== See also ==
- Candlelight vigil
- Grave candle
- Navigium Isidis
- Pelusia
- Yahrzeit candle
