= Serapia =

Roman Imperial religious festival

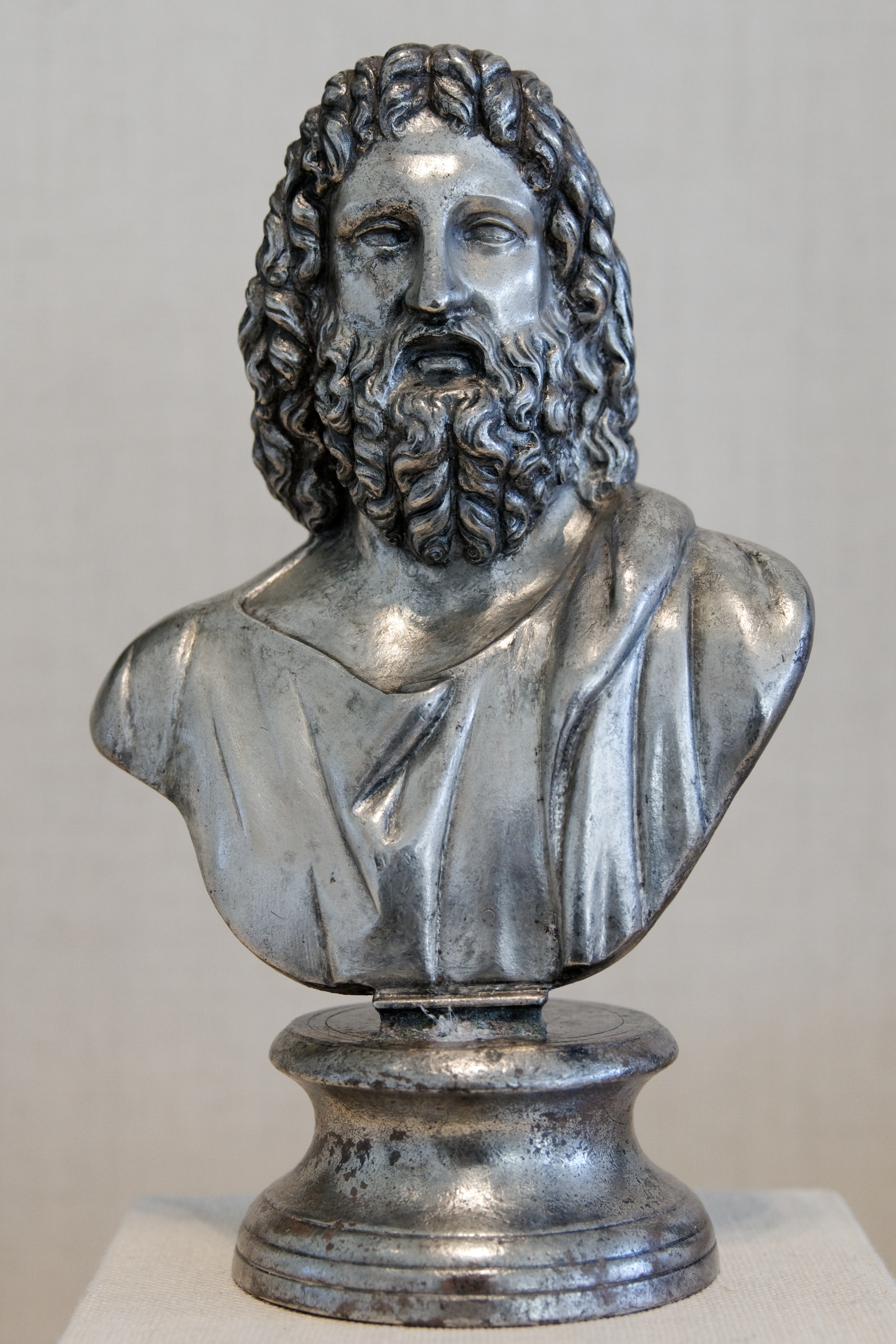
Roman Imperial bust of Serapis in silver and gold (mid-2nd century AD, Metropolitan Museum of Art

The Serapia or Sarapia was a Roman Imperial religious festival devoted to the Greco-Egyptian god Serapis. It is found as an official holiday on 25 April as late as the Calendar of Filocalus in 354 AD. In farmers' almanacs (menologia rustica) dating to the first half of the 1st century, the day was a sacrum or rite for Serapis along with Isis Pharia, "Isis of the Lighthouse (Pharos) of Alexandria".

Serapis was incorporated into the Imperial cult of Rome because of his importance as a city god of Alexandria. Under the epithets Dominus ("Master, Lord"), Magnus ("the Great") and Invictus ("Invincible"), he was cultivated as a deity of success and victory in conjunction with Sol/Helios, Jupiter/Zeus, and Neptune.

Papyri document the celebration of the Egyptian Serapia along the Nile as late as 315. One records payments to those performing in the ceremonies at Oxyrhynchus during the late 3rd century, including a comedian, two "Homerists", dancers, and athletes. A "dog-headed one" (kynopou) may be a priest wearing a mask of Anubis. Processions for Egyptian deities at Rome seem to have included masked participants. Among the Greeks and Romans, Serapis was sometimes identified with the underworld ruler Pluto, and Anubis with Cerberus. In addition to his payment from the festival organizers, the kynopou was to receive welcome gifts (xenia) from people along the processional route, perhaps to obtain reciprocal hospitality in the afterlife. For Egyptian observers, the presence of Anubis would have affirmed the connection of the Hellenistic Serapis to the traditional Egyptian god Osiris.

== See also ==
- Isidis Navigium, the "sailing" festival of Isis on March 5
- Pelusia, festival of Isis and the birth of Harpocrates on March 20
