= Grave candle =

Candle lit in memory of the dead

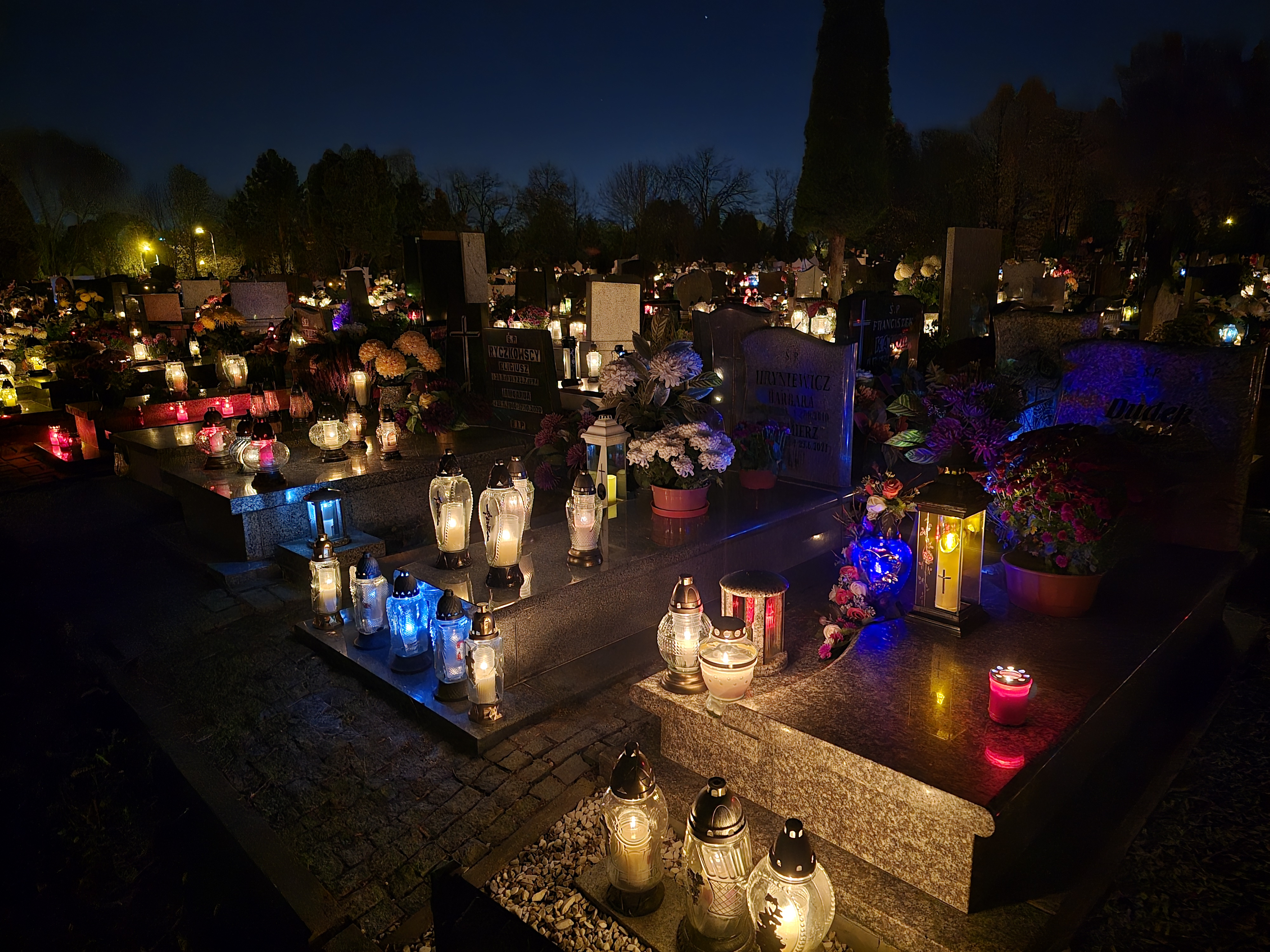
Grave candles on All Saints' Day in Poland

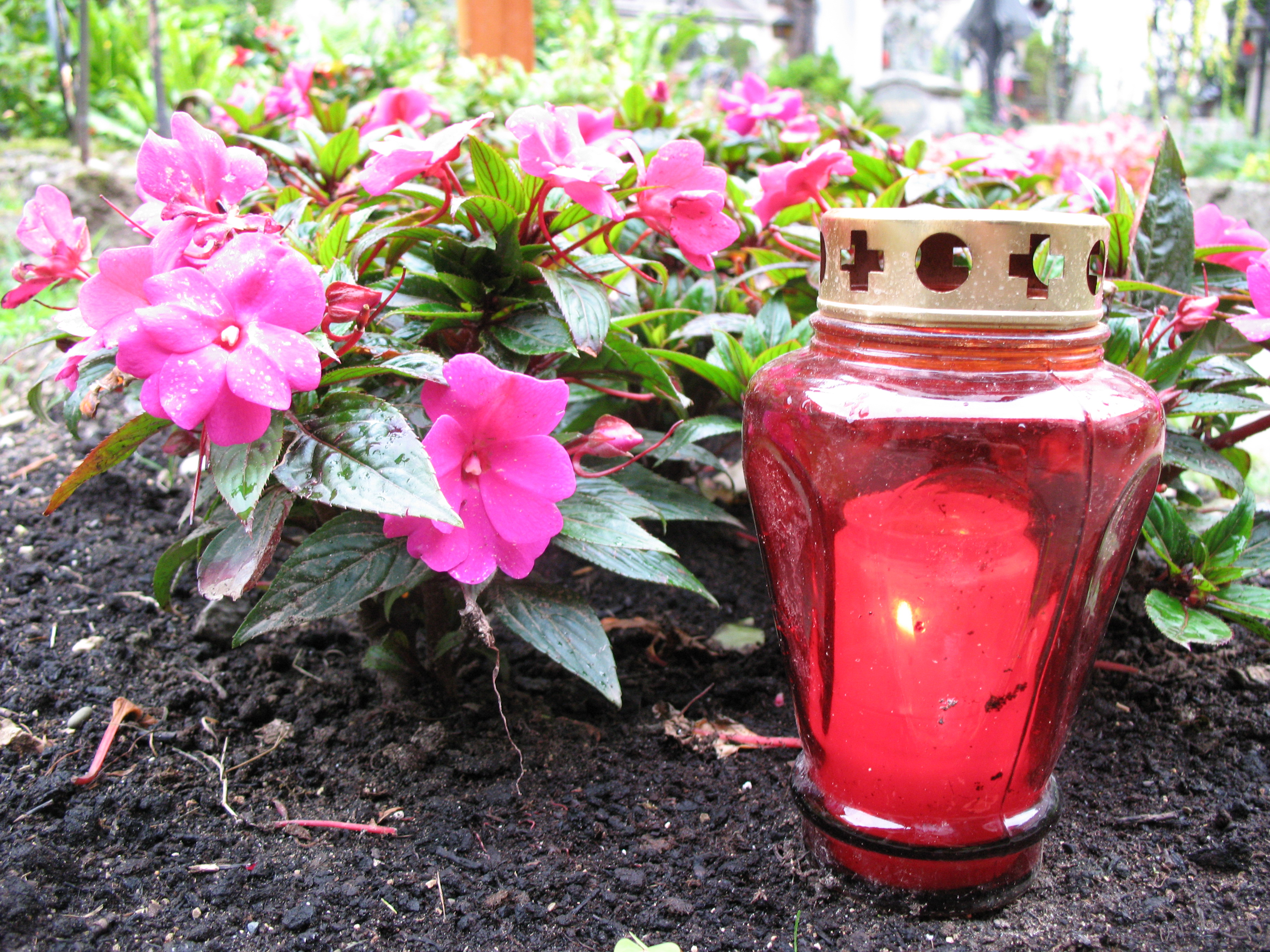
Grave candle with flowers

A grave candle, grave lantern, death candle or death lantern is a type of candle or lantern, which is lit in memory of the dead or to commemorate solemn events. The form of a lantern is commonly used in Christianity, whereas candles are more common in Judaism (where they are known as the Yahrzeit candle).

Roman Christians adopted the tradition from Roman pagans. Although at first condemned by Church leaders, notably at the Council of Elvira, the Church eventually adopted this custom by the 5th century to commemorate martyr saints.

The grave lanterns, known as znicz, are a common tradition in Poland.

== See also ==
- Candlelight vigil
- Lychnapsia
- Votive candle
