= El Malei Rachamim =

Jewish prayer for the dead

"El Malei Rachamim" (Hebrew: אֵל מָלֵא רַחֲמִים, lit., "God full of Mercy", or "Merciful God") is a Jewish prayer for the soul of a person who has died, usually recited at the graveside during the burial service and at memorial services during the year.

== Place in the Liturgy ==
In the Eastern Ashkenazi liturgy, the prayer is usually chanted by a hazzan for the ascension of the souls of the dead on the following occasions: during the funeral; at an unveiling of the tombstone; a yizkor service on the four of the Jewish festivals, Yom Kippur, Shemini Atzeret, and the last day of Passover and Shavuot; on the Yahrzeit on a day when there is public reading from the Torah, or the closest date before the Yahrzeit; and on other occasions on which the memory of the dead is recalled. Yekkes do not this recite this prayer, although it has been adopted on various occasions in certain Western Ashkenazi communities, such as Khal Adath Jeshurun in Washington Heights.

Sefardi, Italkim, and Romaniote Jews recite a similar prayer, the Ashkavah (אַשְׁכָּבָה), is recited by the reader of the Torah on Mondays and Thursdays.

The recitation of both prayers is usually accompanied by pledges to donate to charity in memory of the deceased.

== Wording of the Prayer ==
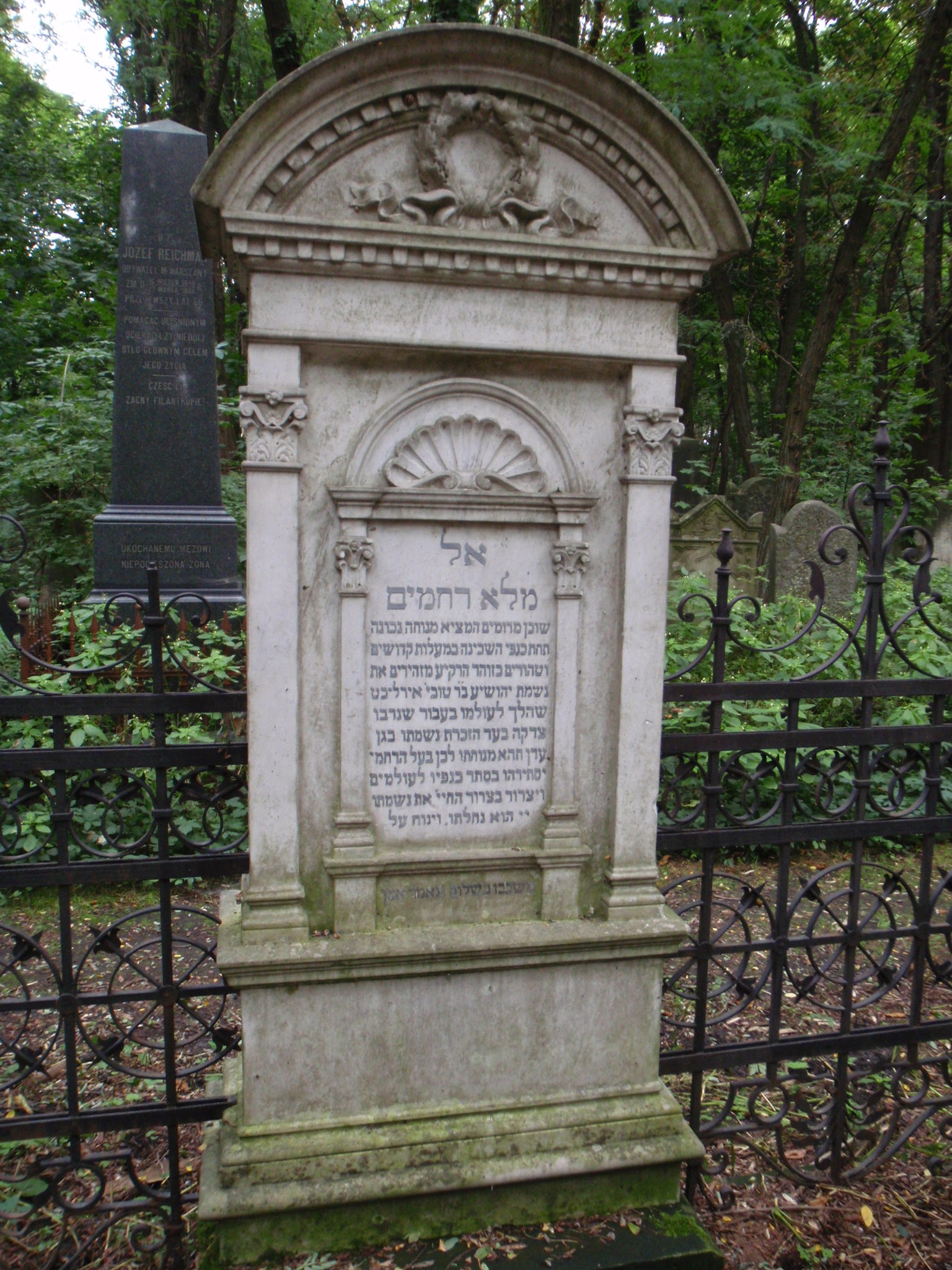
Text of El malei rachamim at tombstone at Powązki Jewish cemetery in Warsaw

The prayer has a fixed structure, composed of a specific text in which is incorporated the deceased's name (in the case of an individual's commemoration), or a description of the deceased (in the case of the commemoration of a group).

=== Version for a deceased individual ===
The text of the mourner's prayer varies slightly depending on the gender of the one for whom is said.

If the mourner's prayer is recited on behalf of a woman, the following text is recited:

אֵל מָלֵא רַחֲמִים, שׁוֹכֵן בַּמְּרוֹמִים, הַמְצֵא מְנוּחָה נְכוֹנָה עַל כַּנְפֵי הַשְּׁכִינָה, בְּמַעֲלוֹת קְדוֹשִׁים וּטְהוֹרִים כְּזוֹהַר הָרָקִיעַ מַזְהִירִים, אֶת נִשְׁמַת (פלונית בת פלוני) שֶׁהָלְכָה לְעוֹלָמָהּ, בַּעֲבוּר שֶׁנָדְבוּ צְדָקָה בְּעַד הַזְכָּרַת נִשְׁמָתָהּ, בְּגַן עֵדֶן תְּהֵא מְנוּחָתָהּ. לָכֵן בַּעַל הָרַחֲמִים יַסְתִּירֶהָ בְּסֵתֶר כְּנָפָיו לְעוֹלָמִים, וְיִצְרֹר בִּצְרוֹר הַחַיִּים אֶת נִשְׁמָתָהּ. יְיָ הוּא נַחֲלָתָהּ, וְתָנוּחַ בְּשָׁלוֹם עַל מִשְׁכָּבָהּ, וְנֹאמַר אָמֵן׃

Translation:

Merciful God who dwells above, provide a sure rest on the wings of the Divine Presence, amongst the holy and pure who shine as brightly as the sky,
to the soul of (Hebrew name of deceased) daughter of (Hebrew name of her father), who has gone on to her eternity. For the sake of the charity which they gave to commemorate her soul, let her rest be in the Garden of Eden. Hence, the Merciful One will shade her forever with his wings, and will bind her in the bundle of life. The LORD is her heritage, and she shall rest peacefully on her bed. So let us say, Amen.

If the mourner's prayer is recited on behalf of a man, the following text is recited:

אֵל מָלֵא רַחֲמִים, שׁוֹכֵן בַּמְּרוֹמִים, הַמְצֵא מְנוּחָה נְכוֹנָה, עַל כַּנְפֵי הַשְּׁכִינָה, בְּמַעֲלוֹת קְדוֹשִׁים וּטְהוֹרִים, כְּזוֹהַר הָרָקִיעַ מַזְהִירִים, אֶת נִשְׁמַת (פלוני בן פלוני) שֶׁהָלַךְ לְעוֹלָמוֹ, בַּעֲבוּר שֶׁנָּדְבוּ צְדָקָה בְּעַד הַזְכָּרַת נִשְׁמָתוֹ, בְּגַן עֵדֶן תְּהֵא מְנוּחָתוֹ. לָכֵן בַּעַל הָרַחֲמִים יַסְתִּירֵהוּ בְּסֵתֶר כְּנָפָיו לְעוֹלָמִים, וְיִצְרֹר בִּצְרוֹר הַחַיִּים אֶת נִשְׁמָתוֹ. יְיָ הוּא נַחֲלָתוֹ, וְיָנוּחַ בְּשָׁלוֹם עַל מִשְׁכָּבוֹ, וְנֹאמַר אָמֵן׃

Translation:

Merciful God who dwells above, provide a sure rest on the wings of the Divine Presence, amongst the holy and pure who shine as brightly as the sky, to the soul of (Hebrew name of deceased) son of (Hebrew name of his father), who has gone on to his eternity. For the sake of the charity which they gave to commemorate his soul, let his rest be in the Garden of Eden. Hence, the Merciful One will shade him forever with his wings, and will bind him in the bundle of life. The LORD is his heritage, and he shall rest peacefully on his bed. So let us say, Amen.

The prayer refers to a charitable pledge by the person saying it, and thus one should give charity

=== Version for the Remembrance of IDF Soldiers ===
אֵל מָלֵא רַחֲמִים שׁוכֵן בַּמְּרומִים, הַמְצֵא מְנוּחָה נְכונָה עַל כַּנְפֵי הַשְּׁכִינָה, בְּמַעֲלות קְדושִׁים, טְהורִים וְגִבּורִים, כְּזהַר הָרָקִיעַ מַזְהִירִים. לְנִשְׁמות חַיָּלֵי צְבָא הֲגָנָה לְיִשְׂרָאֵל וְלוֹחָמֵי הָמַחְתָרוֹת שֶׁנָּפְלוּ בְּמִלְחֲמות יִשְׂרָאֵל, וְכל הַלּוחֲמִים בְּמַעַרְכות הָעָם שֶׁחֵרְפוּ נַפְשָׁם לָמוּת עַל קְדֻשַּׁת הַשֵּׁם, וּבְעֶזְרַת אֱלהֵי מַעַרְכות יִשְׂרָאֵל הֵבִיאוּ לִתְקוּמַת הָאֻמָּה וְהַמְּדִינָה וְלִגְאֻלַּת הָאָרֶץ וְעִיר הָאֱלהִים וכל אלה שנרצחו בארץ ומחוצה לה בידי המרצחים מארגוני הטרור׃

לָכֵן בַּעַל הָרַחֲמִים יַסְתִּירֵם בְּסֵתֶר כְּנָפָיו לְעולָמִים, וְיִצְרור בִּצְרור הַחַיִּים אֶת נִשְׁמָתָם. ה' הוּא נַחֲלָתָם, בְּגַן עֵדֶן (תְּהֵא) מְנוּחָתָם, וְיָנוּחוּ בְּשָׁלום עַל מִשְׁכָּבָם, וְיַעַמְדוּ לְגורָלָם לְקֵץ הָיָּמִין, וְנאמַר אָמֵן׃

Translation:

Merciful God who dwells above, provide a sure rest on the wings of the Divine Presence, amongst the holy and pure and heroic who shine as brightly as the sky, to the souls of the soldiers of the Israel Defense Forces and the underground fighters who fell in Israel's wars, and all the fighters in the nation's battles who gave their lives to die for the sanctity of Hashem who, with the help of the God of Israel's battles, brought about the establishment of the nation and the State and the reclamation of the land and the City of God, and all those who were murdered in the Land and outside it by the murderers of the terrorist groups.

Hence, the Merciful One will shade them forever in his wings, and will bind them in the bundle of life. The LORD is their inheritance, the Garden of Eden their resting place, and they will rest in peace on upon their beds, and they will receive their reward at the end of days. So let us say, Amen.

=== Version for the Remembrance of Victims of the Holocaust ===
אֵל מָלֵא רַחֲמִים שׁוֹכֵן בַּמְּרוֹמִים, הַמְצֵא מְנוּחָה נְכוֹנָה עַל כַּנְפֵי הַשְּׁכִינָה, בְּמַעֲלוֹת קְדוֹשִׁים וטְהוֹרִים כְּזוֹהַר הָרָקִיע מַזְהִירִים אֶת כָּל הַנְּשָׁמוֹת שֶׁל שֵׁשֶׁת מִילְיוֹנֵי הַיְּהוּדִים, חַלְלֵי הַשּׁוֹאָה בְּאֵירוֹפָּה, שֶׁנֶּהֶרְגוּ, שֶׁנִּשְׁחֲטוּ, שֶׁנִּשְׂרְפוּ וְשֶׁנִּסְפּוּ עַל קִדּוּשׁ הַשֵׁם, בִּידֵי הַמְרַצְּחִים הַגֶּרְמָנִים הָנַאצִים וְעוֹזְרֵיהֶם מִשְּׁאָר הֶעַמִּים. לָכֵן בַּעַל הָרַחֲמִים יַסְתִּירֵם בְּסֵתֶר כְּנָפָיו לְעוֹלָמִים, וְיִצְרוֹר בִּצְרוֹר הַחַיִּים אֶת נִשְׁמוֹתֵיהֶם, ה' הוּא נַחֲלָתָם, בְּגַן עֵדֶן תְּהֵא מְנוּחָתָם, וְיַעֶמְדוּ לְגוֹרָלָם לְקֵץ הַיָּמִין, וְנֹאמַר אָמֵן׃

Translation:

Merciful God, who dwells above, provide a sure rest upon the Divine Presence's wings, amongst of the holy and the pure, whose shining resembles the sky's, all the souls of the six million Jews, victims of the European Holocaust, who were murdered, slaughtered, burnt and exterminated for the Sanctification of the Name, by the German Nazi assassins and their helpers from the rest of the peoples. Therefore, the Master of Mercy will protect them forever, from behind the hiding of his wings, and will tie their souls with the rope of life. The Everlasting is their heritage, the Garden of Eden shall be their resting room, and they shall rest peacefully upon their lying place, they will stand for their fate at the end of days, and let us say: Amen

== Cultural usage ==
From this prayer, the poet Yehuda Amichai wrote his poem "El malei rachamim", starting with the words:

אֶל מָלֵא רַחֲמִים
אִלְמָלֵא הָאֵל מְלֵא רַחֲמִים
הָיוּ הָרַחֲמִים בָּעוֹלָם וְלֹא רַק בּוֹ

Translation:

"God, full of mercy
If God were not so full of mercy
There would be mercy in the world, not just in Him"
