= Yizkor =

Jewish memorial prayer

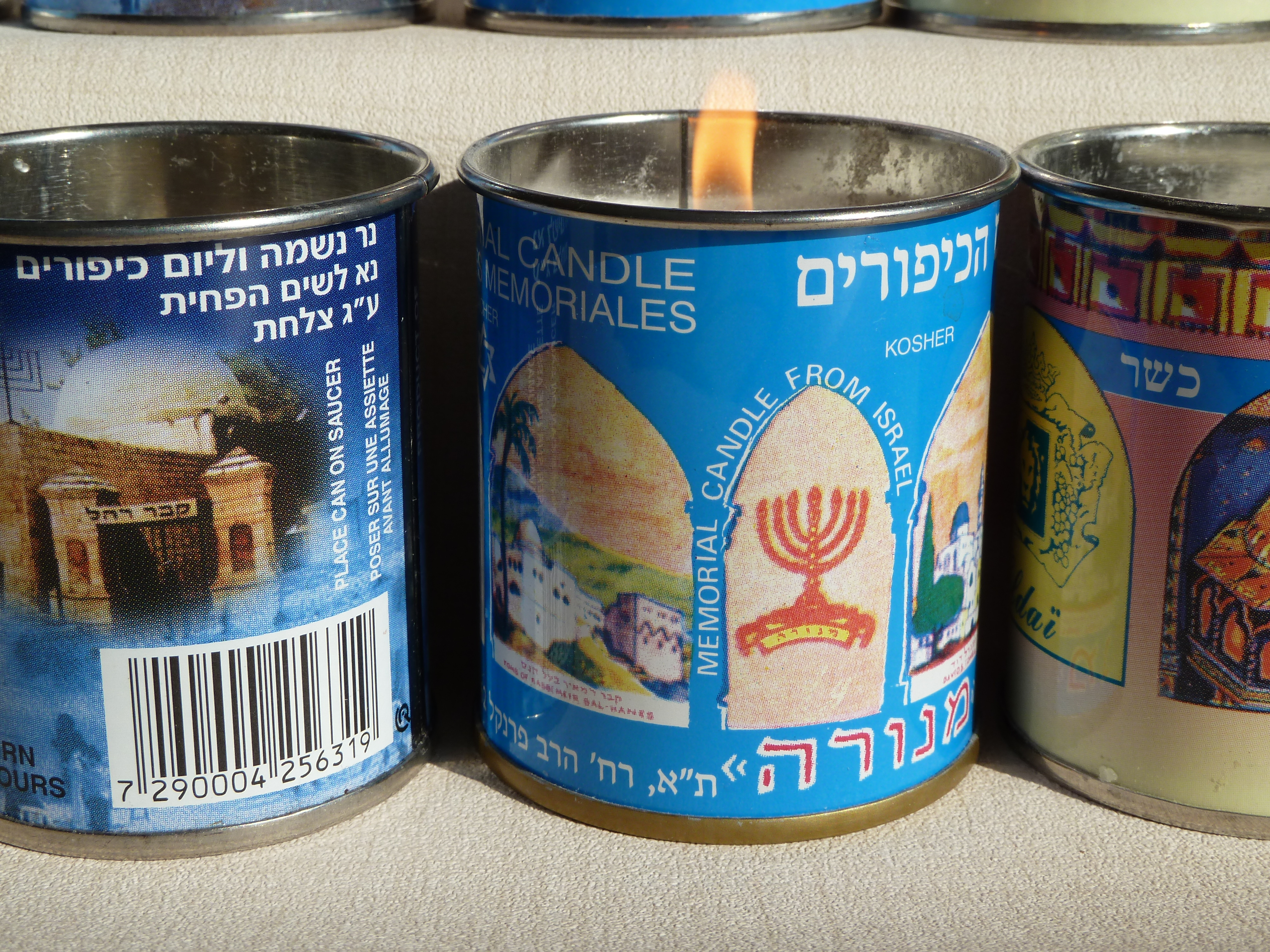
Yahrzeit candles are commonly lit on the days when Yizkor is recited.

Hazkarat Neshamot (Hebrew: הַזְכָּרַת נְשָׁמוֹת, romanized: hazkārat nǝšāmot, lit. 'recalling of the souls'), (Note: German: Seelenfeier, lit. 'soul celebration'), commonly known by its opening word, yizkor "may [God] remember", is an Ashkenazi Jewish memorial prayer service for the dead. It is an important occasion for many Jews, even those who do not attend synagogue services regularly. In most Ashkenazi communities, it is held after the Torah reading four times a year: on Yom Kippur, on the final day of Passover, on the second day of Shavuot, and on Shemini Atzeret. (Note: Some Western Ashkenazi communities historically said Yizkor on the Shabbat before Shavuot and on the Shabbat before Tisha B'Av.)

Following the wording of the yizkor, which is traditionally recited for an individual who has died, special versions were composed for collective commemoration:

- At memorial ceremonies for Israel's fallen soldiers, particularly those held on Yom HaZikaron for the fallen of Israel's wars, a special version of yizkor is recited. The special wording of yizkor for the fallen was first written by Berl Katznelson after the Battle of Tel Hai in 1920. During the 1947–1948 civil war in Mandatory Palestine, a text in this spirit was composed in memory of those who fell in that war, and it was later amended to refer to all who fell in Israel's wars.
- Yizkor is recited on Yom HaShoah in memory of the victims of the Holocaust.

In Sephardic law and customs, there is no yizkor, but hashkabóth serve a similar role in the service for the anyos (yortsayts) of the deceased.

== The prayer ==
=== Yizkor text ===
The version of the prayer for a person whose father has died is as follows:

May God remember the soul of my father, my teacher (name, son of name),
who has gone to his eternal rest, for I pledge charity on his behalf.
In reward for this, may his soul be bound in the bond of life
together with the souls of Abraham, Isaac, and Jacob; Sarah, Rebecca, Rachel, and Leah;
and together with the rest of the righteous men and women who are in the Garden of Eden.
And let us say, Amen.

In the communities of Italy, it is customary to recite Yizkor in the following version:

May God remember for good the soul of all those of His people Israel who have passed away, together with the souls of our forefathers Abraham, Isaac, and Jacob, who left a remembrance of their souls in sanctity. May they rest upon their beds in the Garden of Eden, and let us say, Amen.

== Origin ==
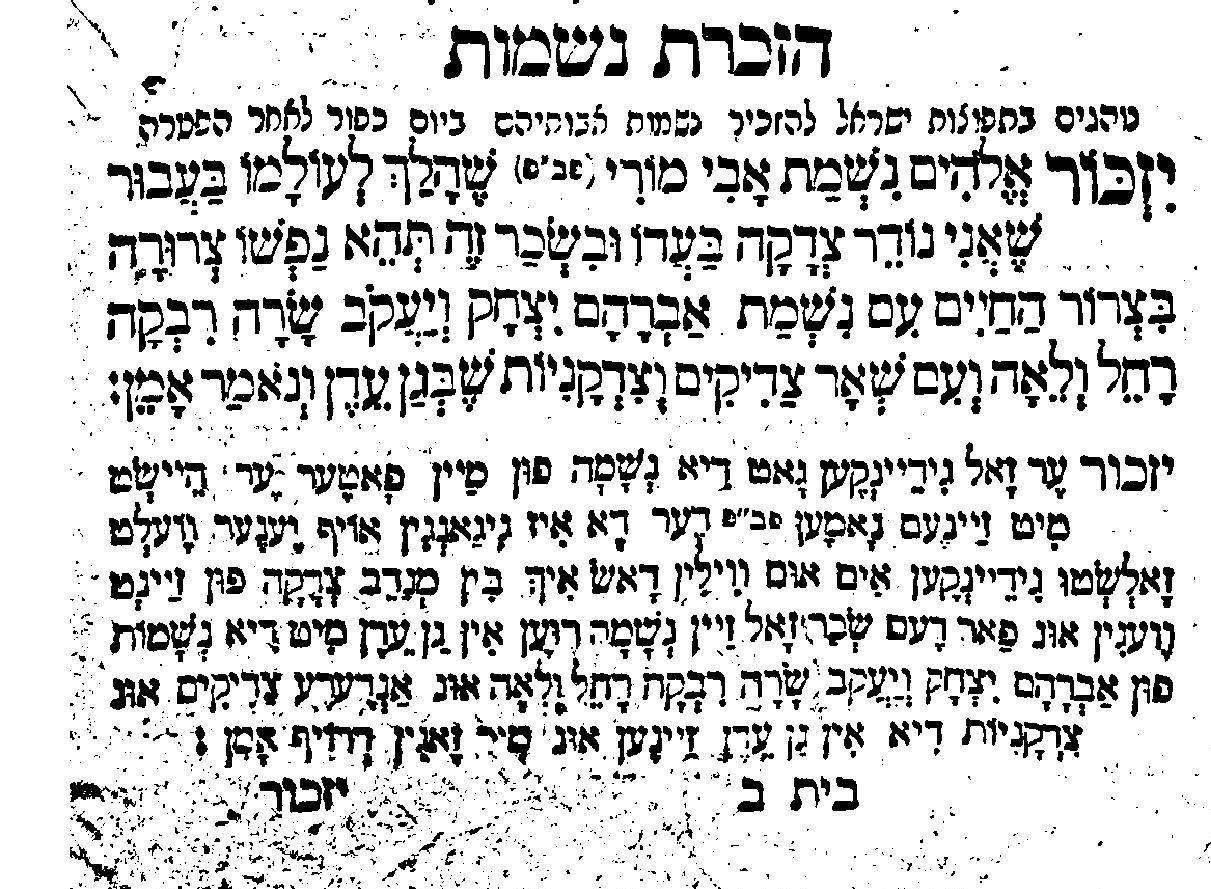
Yizkor in a maḥzor from 1876.

The earliest source of yizkor is the Midrash Tanhuma, which mentions the custom of remembering the deceased and pledging charity on their behalf on Yom Kippur. According to the Sifre, reciting yizkor on Yom Kippur achieves atonement for those who have died. The service was popularized amid the persecution of Jews during the Crusades.

== Customs ==
It is customary for those with both parents alive to leave the main sanctuary during the yizkor service out of respect or superstition. It is usually not attended within the first year of mourning; it is said once the first yahrzeit (anyo, meldado) has passed. Yizkor prayers are intended to be recited in a synagogue with a minyan but are recited without one if no minyan is available. Yizkor is considered a custom and thus not regarded as obligatory.

In some congregations, Yizkor begins with responsive verses and may also include Psalm 91. In addition to personal Yizkor prayers, there are also often collective prayers for martyrs and for victims of the Holocaust, and an appeal for charity. The service concludes with the prayer El male raḥamim.

Jewish communities, in especially landsmanshaftn, wrote yizkor books to commemorate atrocities during the Holocaust. Yahrzeit candles are commonly lit on the days when yizkor is recited.

== Notes and references ==
Notes
