= Candlelight vigil =

Assembly of people showing support for a cause

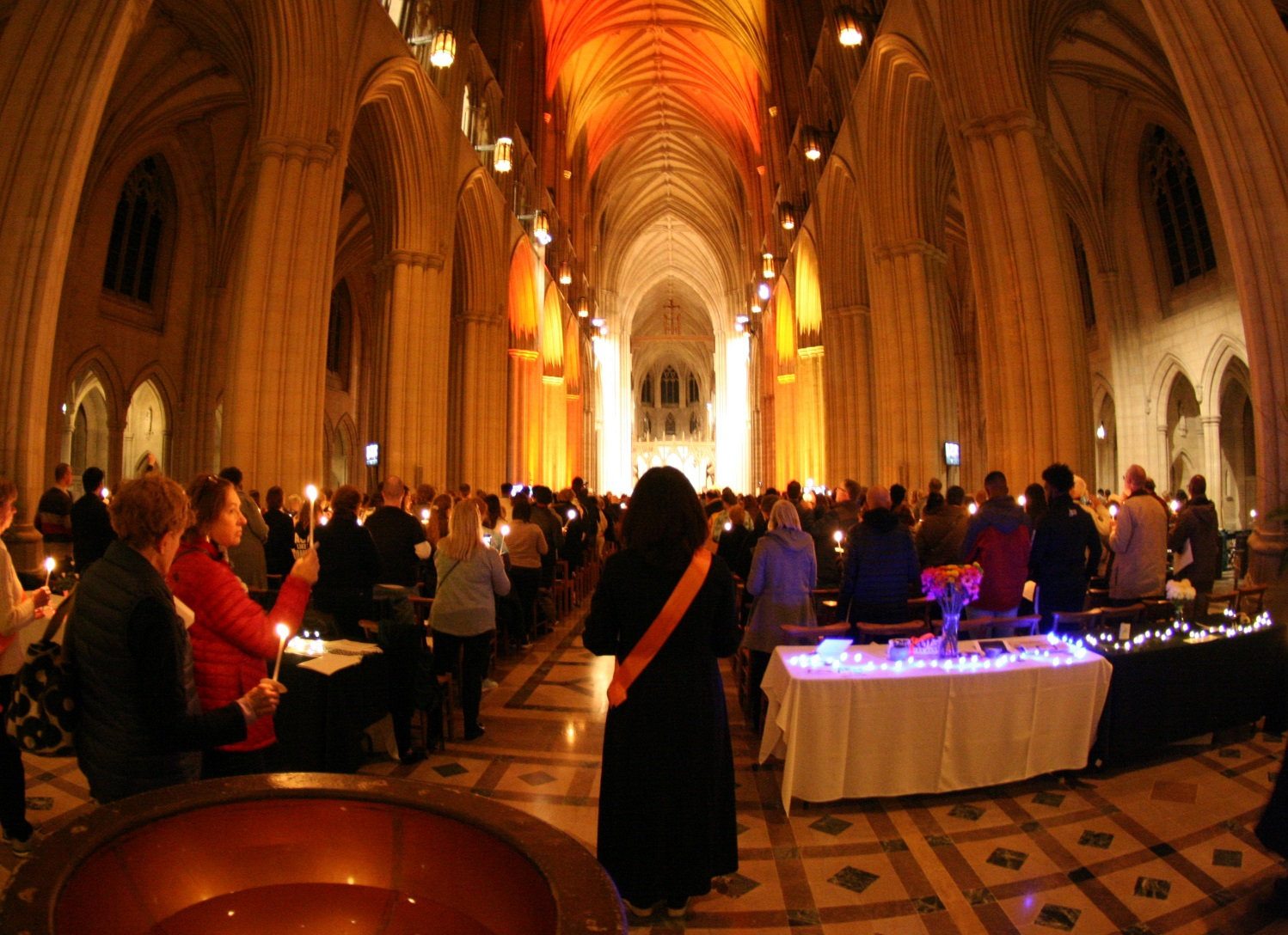
A candlelight vigil at the Cathedral Church of Saint Peter and Saint Paul in the City and Diocese of Washington, part of the Protestant Episcopal Church in the United States of America (2018)

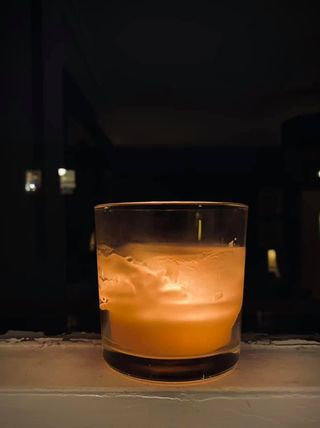
Vigil candle

A candlelight vigil or candlelit vigil or candlelight service is an assembly of people carrying candles, held after sunset in order to pray, show support for a specific cause, or remember the dead, in which case, the event is often called a candlelight memorial. Such events may be held to protest the suffering of some marginalized group of people. A large candlelight vigil may have invited speakers with a public address system and may be covered by local or national media. Speakers give their speech at the beginning of the vigil to explain why they are holding a vigil and what it represents. Vigils with a religious purpose often contain prayer and fasting. On Christmas Eve and Easter Eve, many churches hold a candlelight vigil service.

Candlelight vigils are seen as a nonviolent way to raise awareness of a cause and to motivate change, as well as uniting and supporting those attending the vigil.

== Candlelight vigils in South Korea ==
In South Korea, the Candlelight vigils, or Candlelight protests is a symbolic collective gathering of political dissent in South Korea to combat injustice peacefully. This method of protesting began in 2002 as a result of the Yangju highway incident, was utilized in the rallies against the impeachment of Roh Moo-hyun in 2004, re-used again in the 2008 U.S. beef protests, and emerged in the 2016-18 President Park Geun-hye protests.

== Virtual candlelight vigils ==
In the multiplayer video game EVE Online, players hold "Cyno Vigils" in remembrance of players who have died.

== Gallery ==
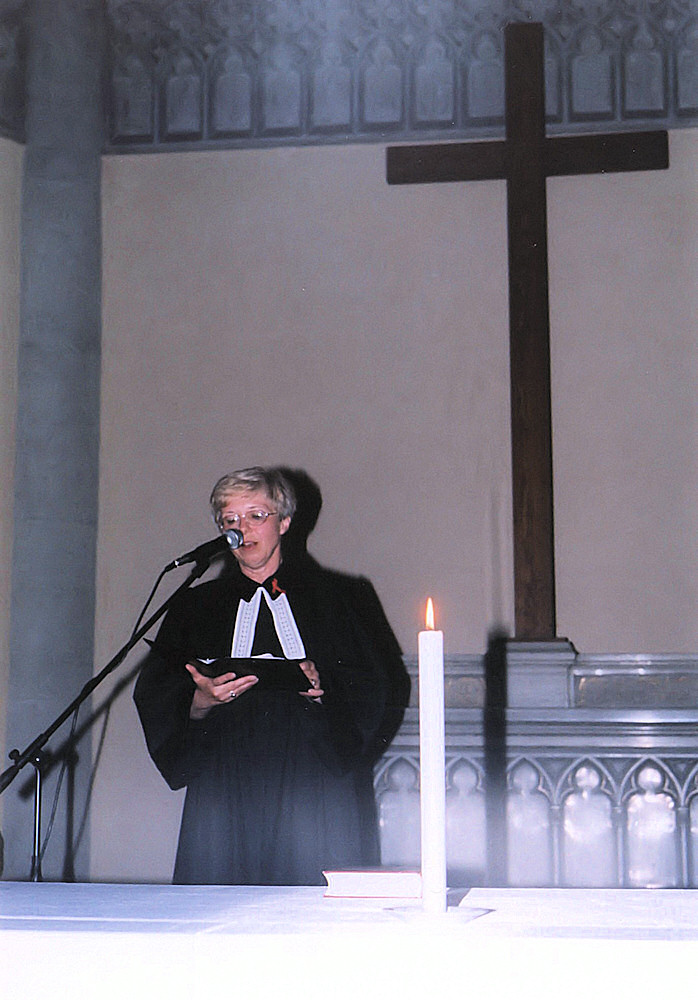
A pastor leads prayer in the Czech Brethren Church of John Amos Comenius for the International AIDS Candlelight Memorial (2001)

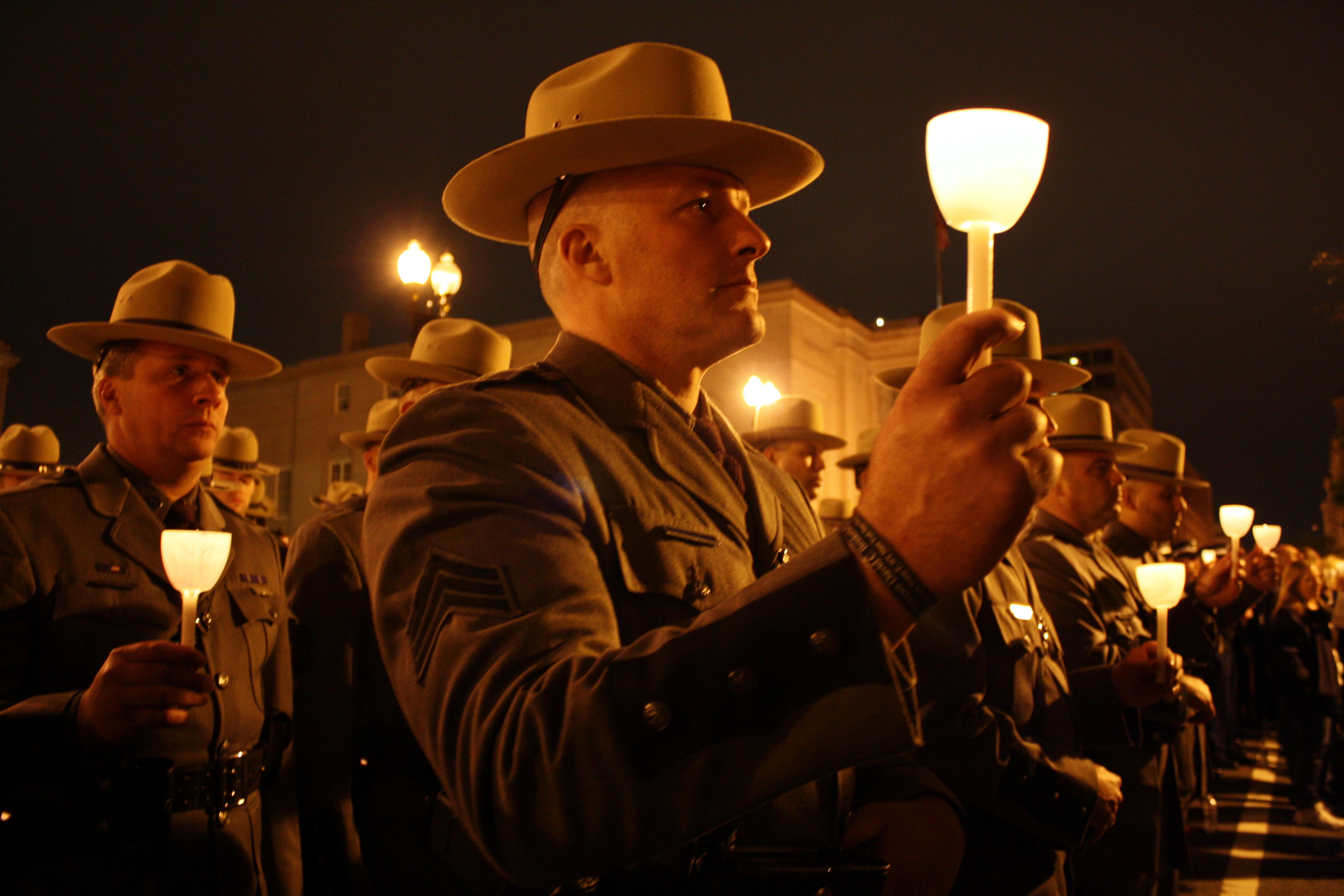
2010 National Police Week 22nd annual candlelight vigil at the National Law Enforcement Officers Memorial at Judiciary Square, Washington, D.C.

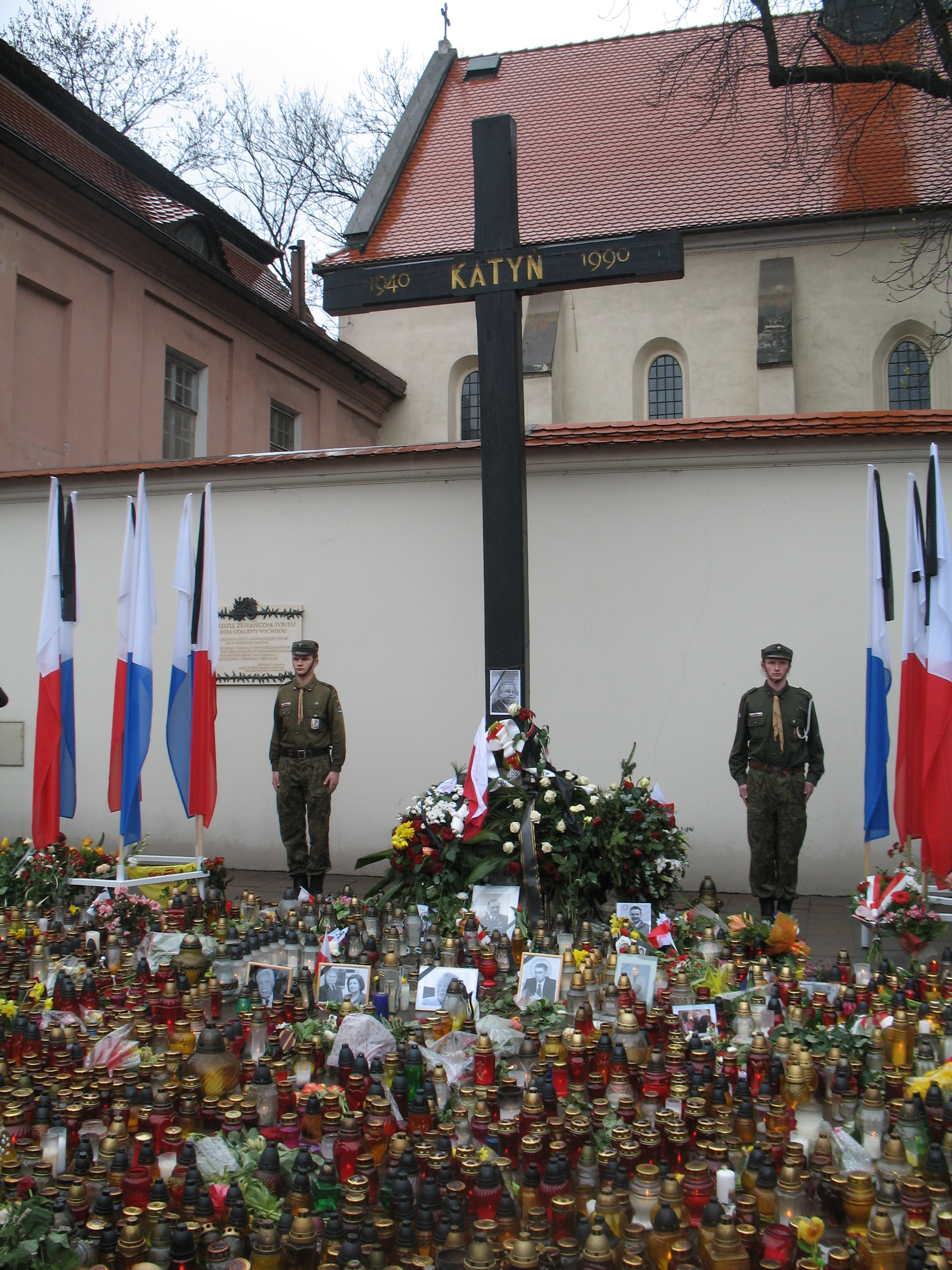
Candlelight vigil at the Katyń Memorial Cross at the Church of St. Giles, Kraków following the Smolensk air disaster

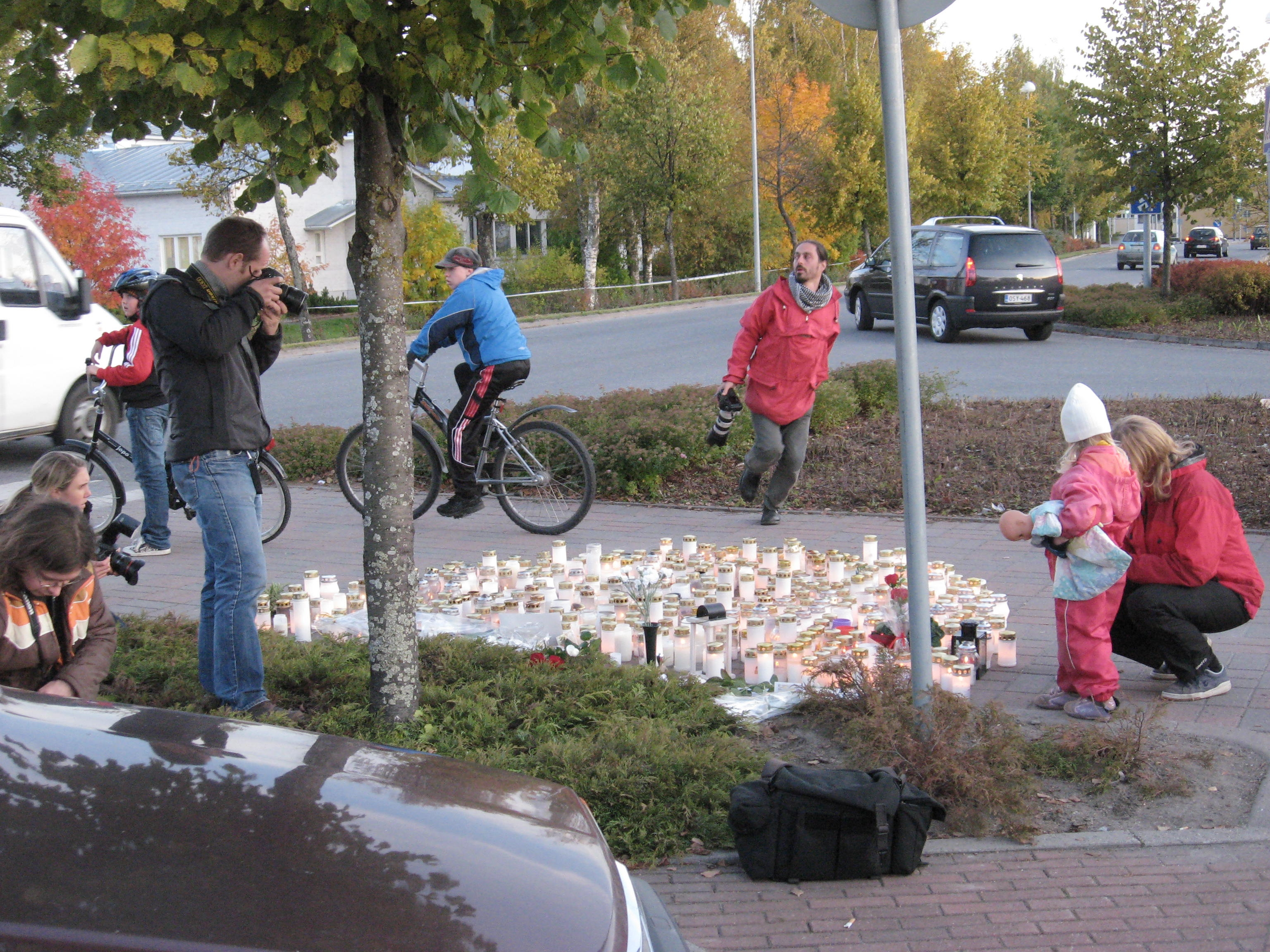
A vigil in Kauhajoki, Finland, one day after the September 23, 2008 shooting incident

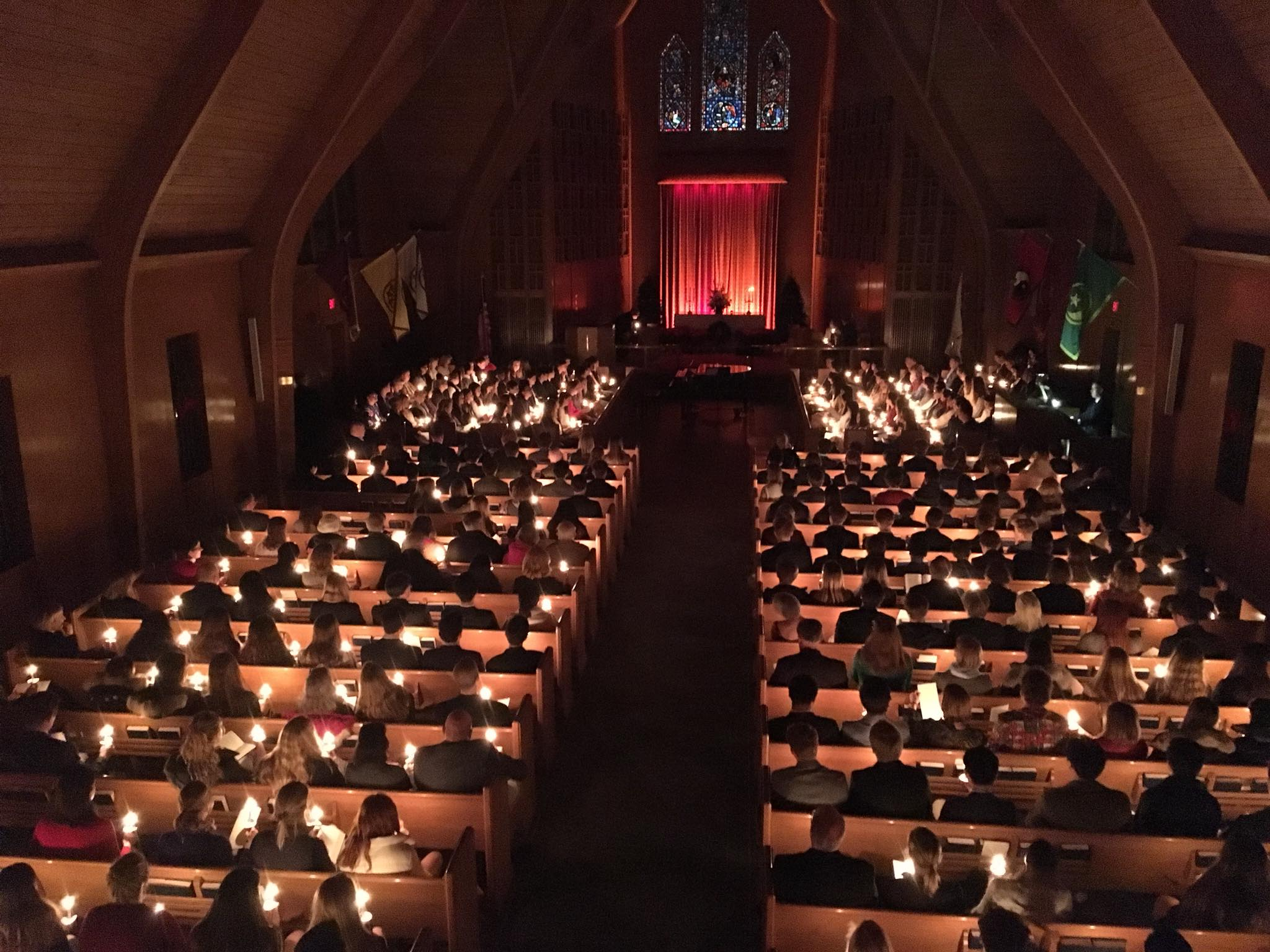
Candlelight service at Andrews Memorial Chapel at Westminster School (Connecticut)

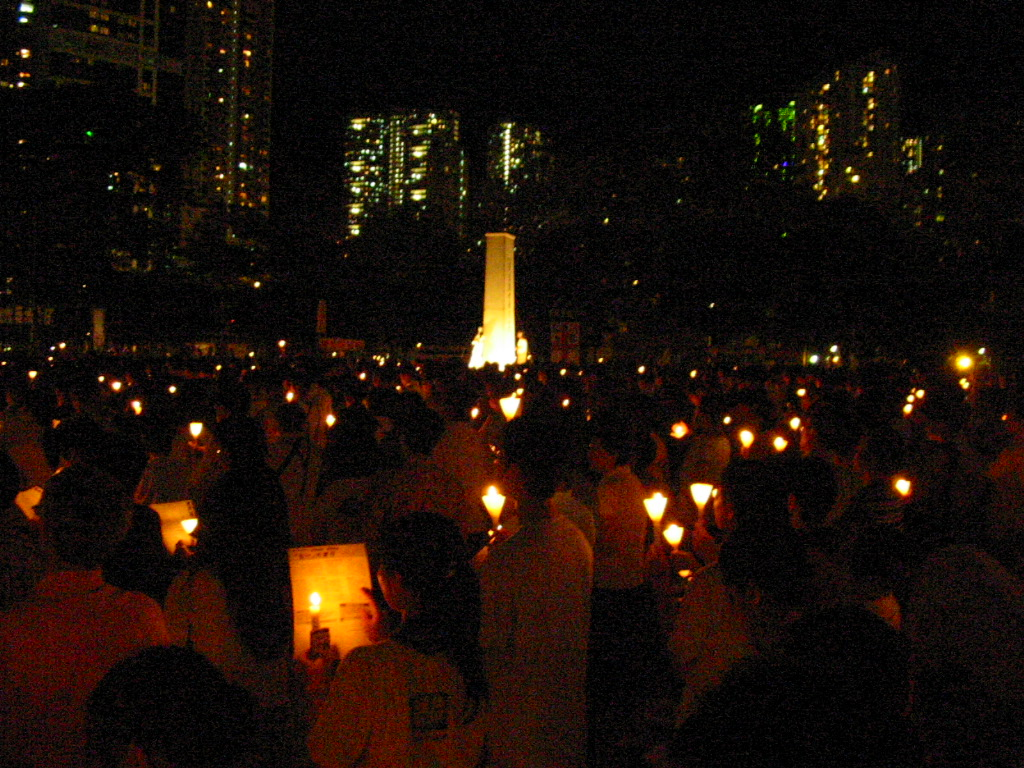
Every year from 1990 to 2019, people attended candlelight vigils on June 4 in Victoria Park, Hong Kong commemorating the victims of 1989 Tiananmen Square protests and massacre. This event can no longer be held.

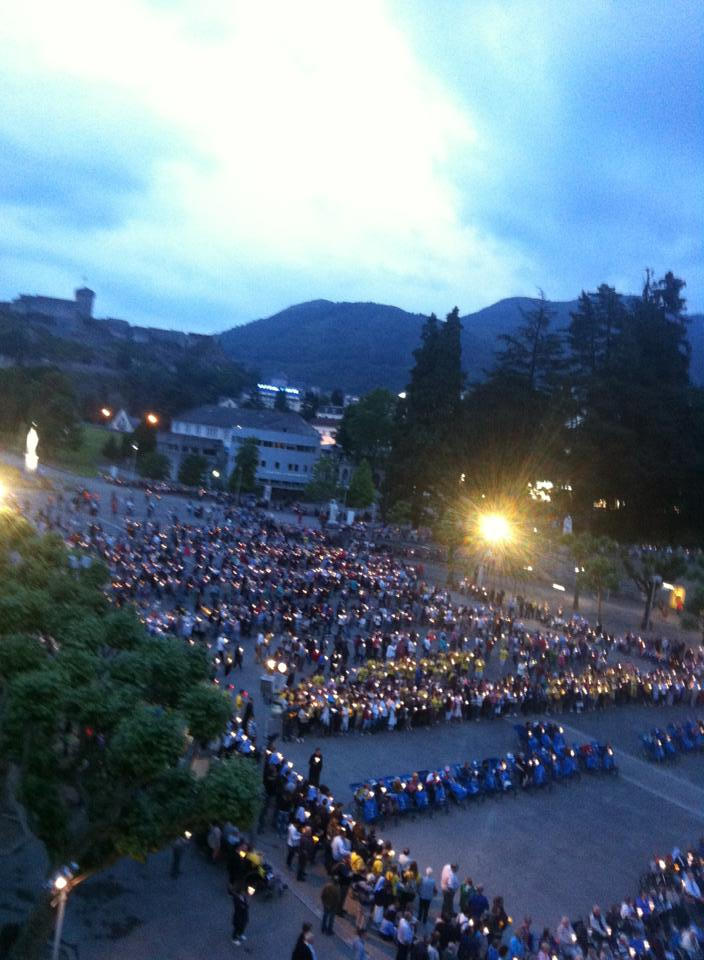
A candlelight vigil in Lourdes, France.

== See also ==
- Grave candle
