= Yahrzeit candle =

Candle lit in memory of the dead in Judaism

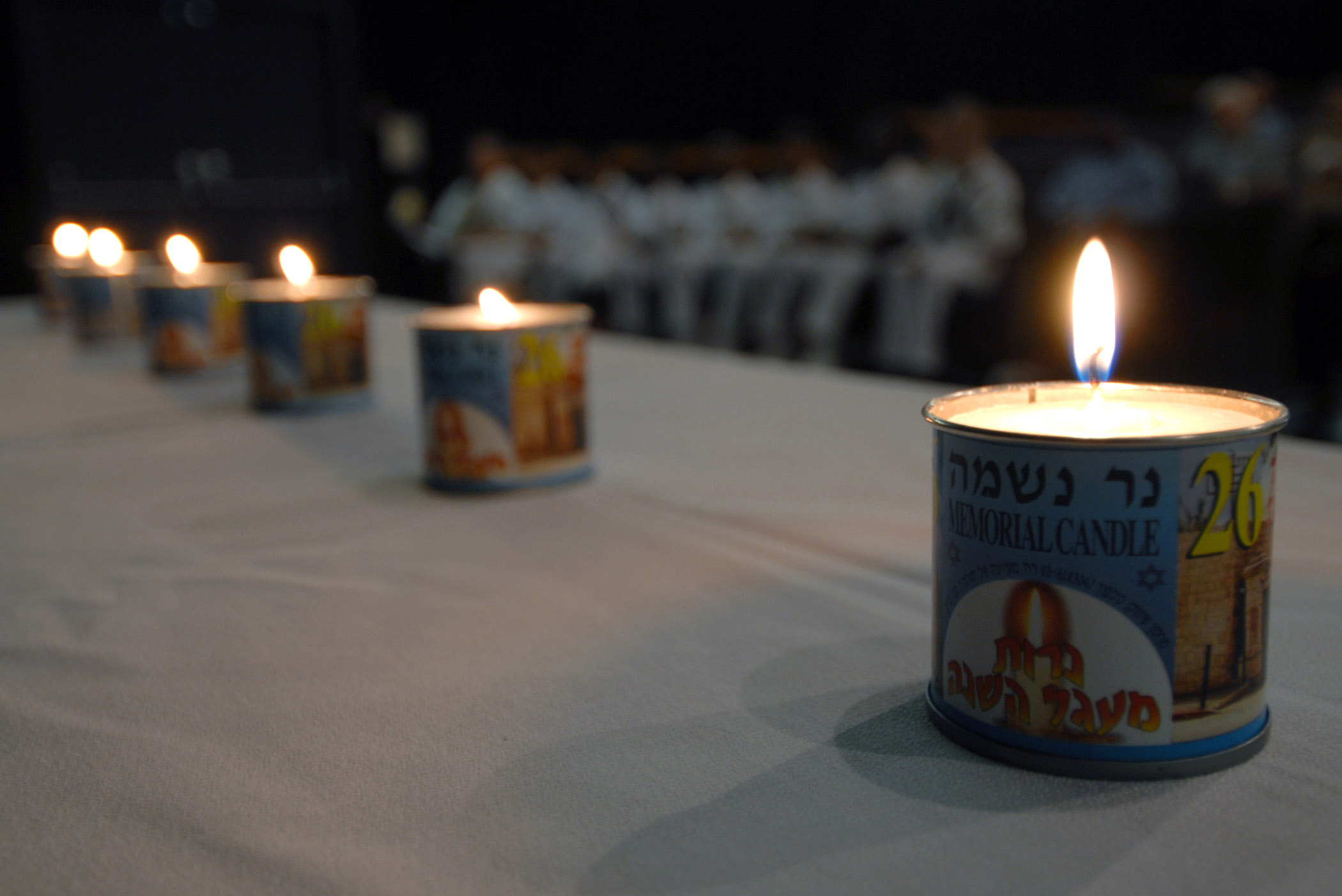
Memorial candle that burns up to 26 hours

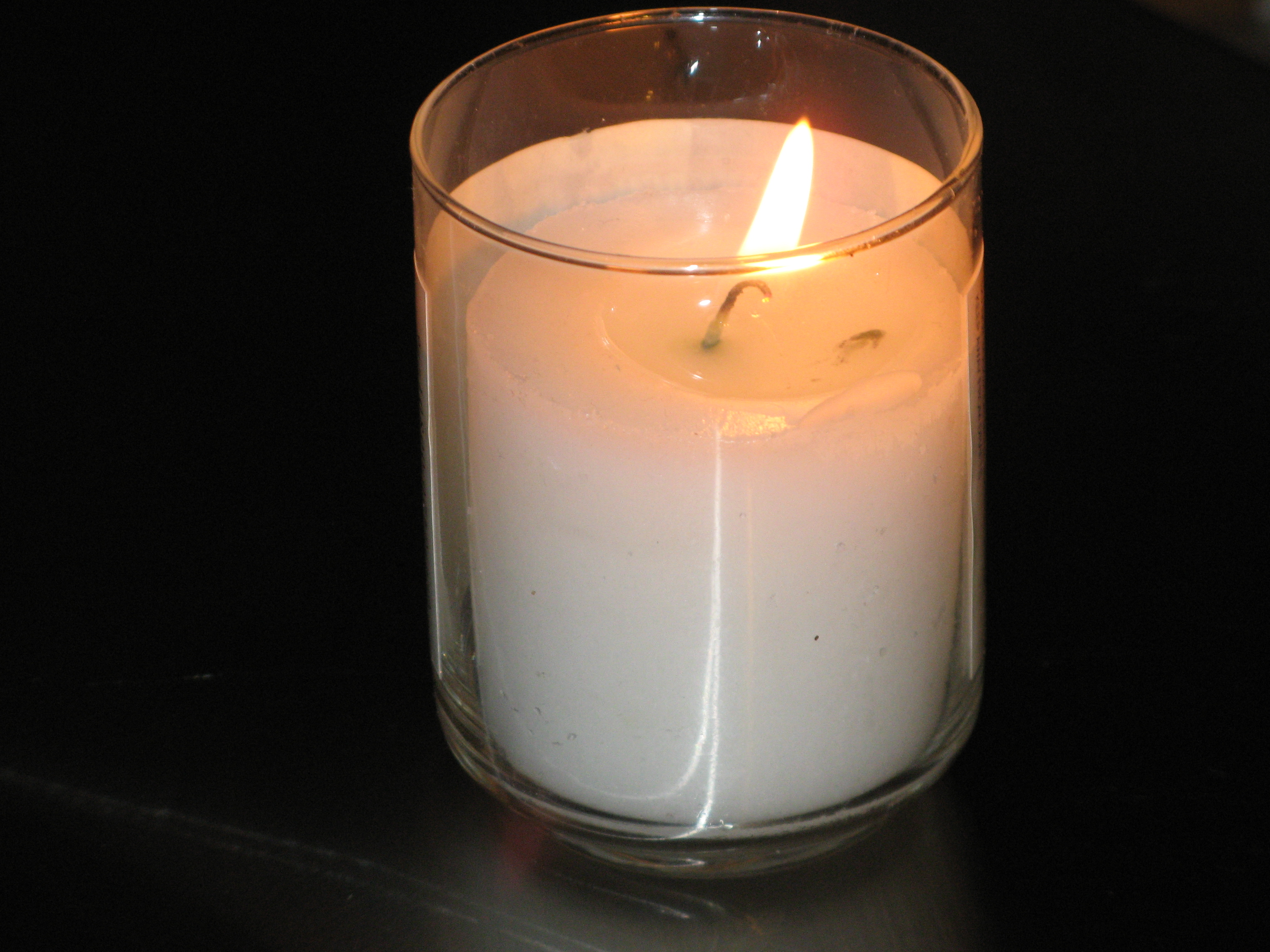
A yahrzeit candle lit in memory of a loved one on the anniversary (the "yahrtzeit") of the death

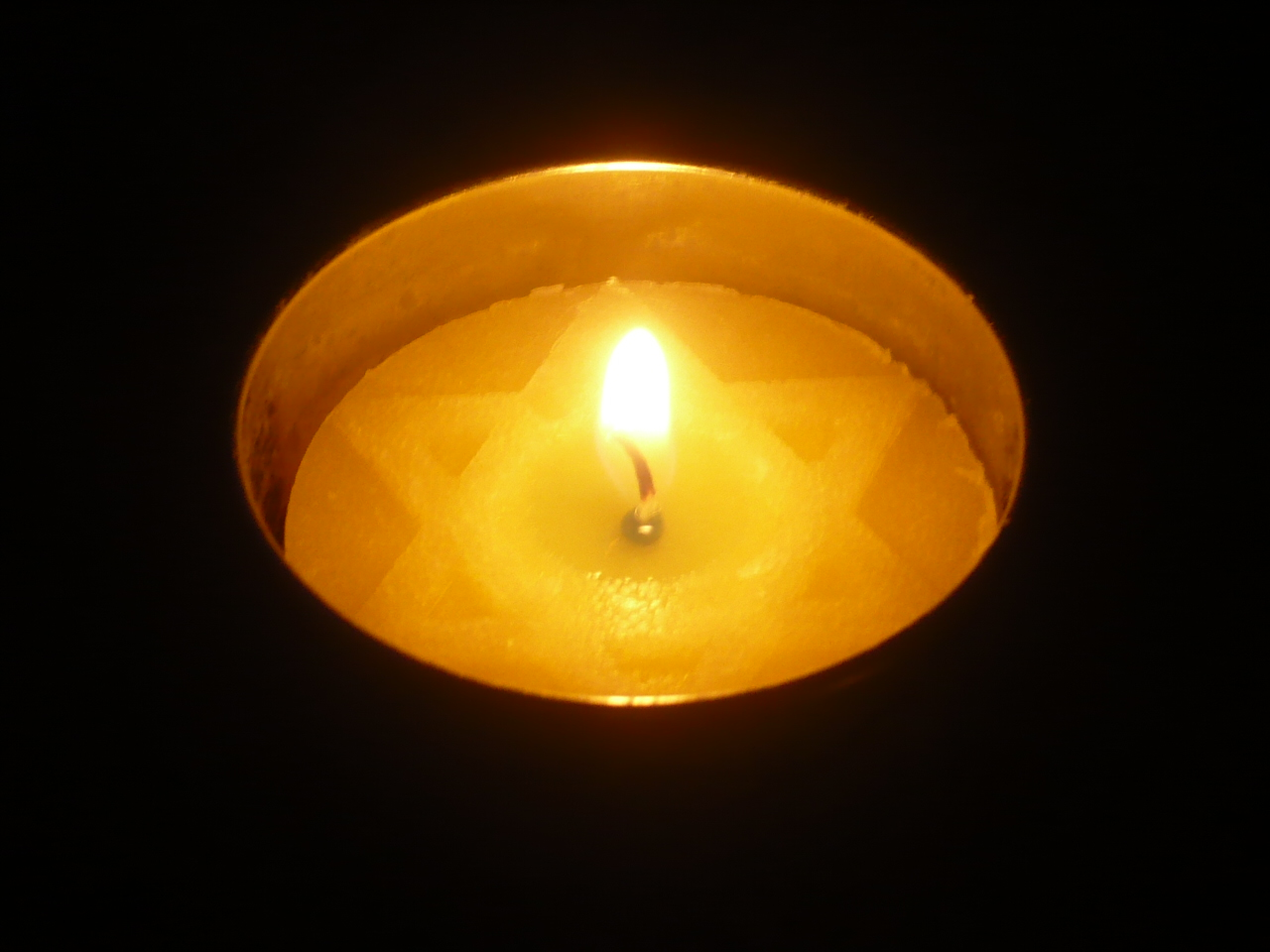
Special yellow Yizkor candle for Yom HaShoah

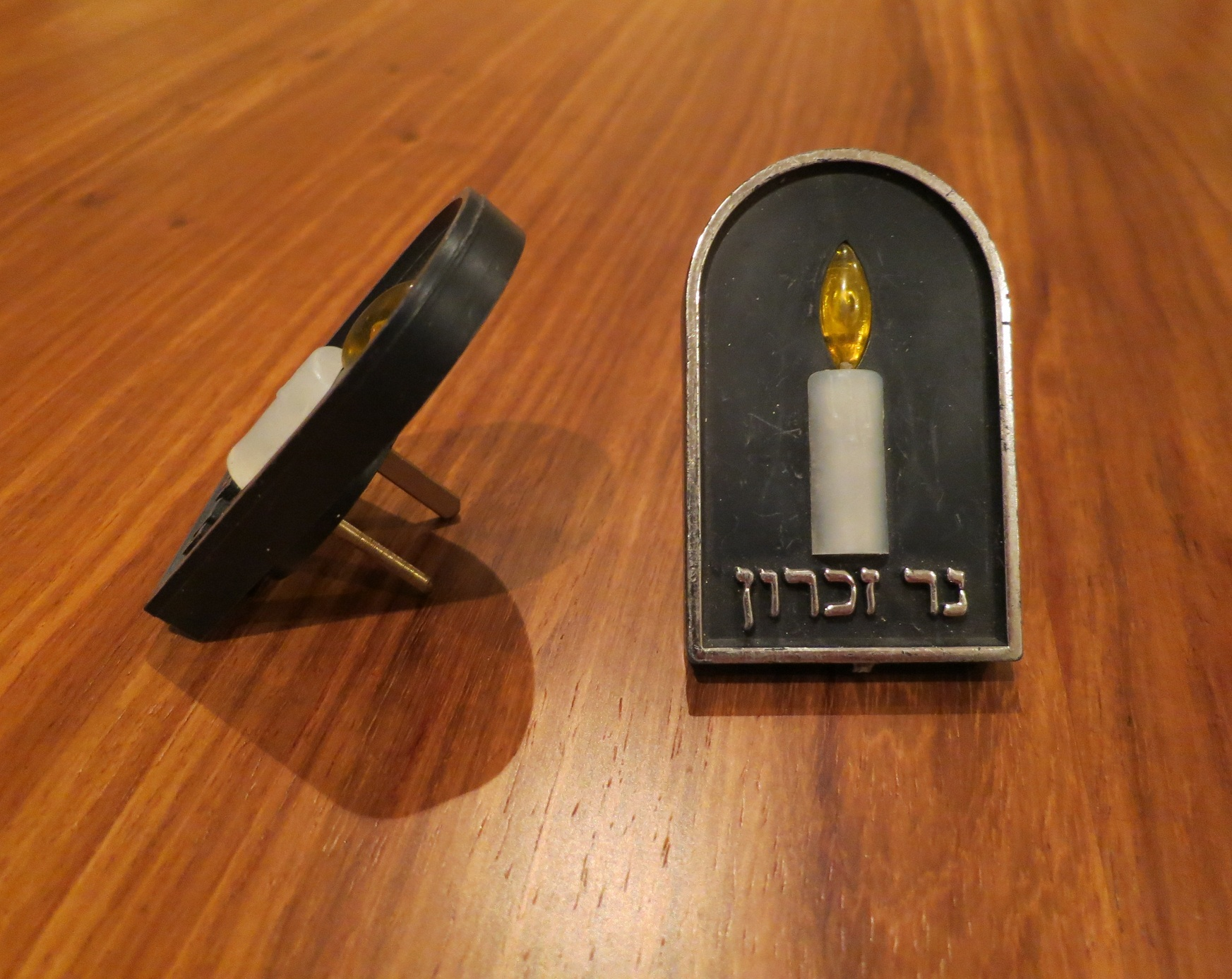
An electrical memorial candle with a Hebrew inscription reading נר זכרון “Ner Zikaron” (light of remembrance)

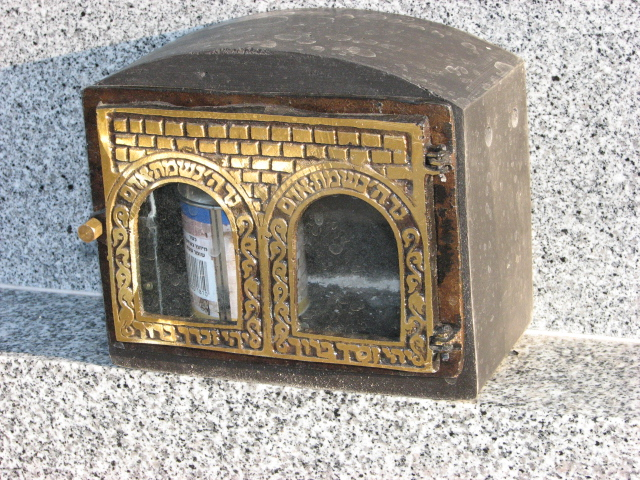
A yahrzeit candle beside a grave, in a box to protect it from the wind

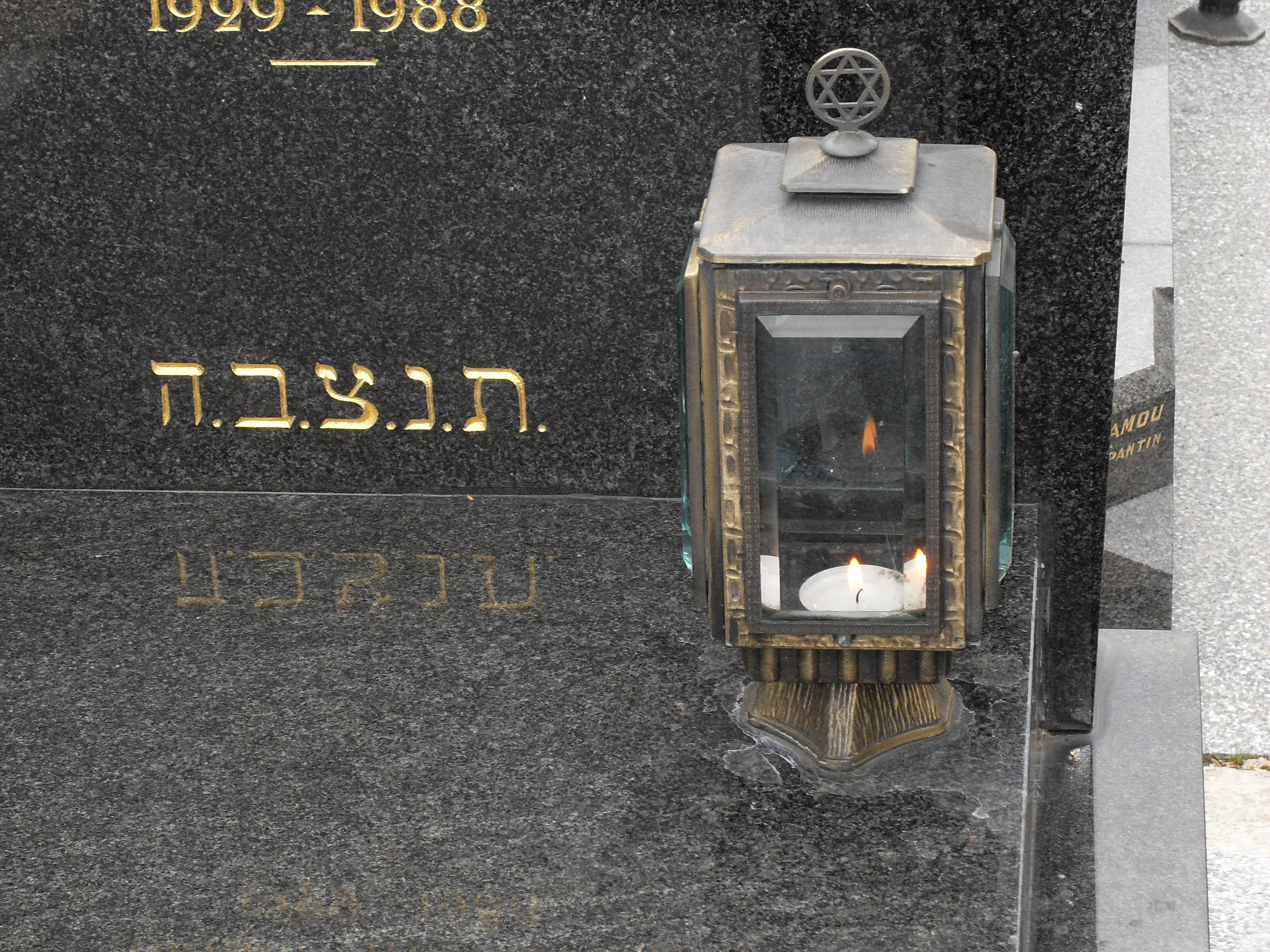
A yahrzeit candle on a grave, in a box to protect it from the wind

A yahrzeit candle, also spelled yahrtzeit candle or called a memorial candle, (Hebrew: נר נשמה, ner neshama, meaning "soul candle"; Yiddish: יאָרצײַט ליכט yortsayt likht, meaning "anniversary candle") is a type of candle that is lit in memory of the dead in Judaism.

== Name ==
The word "yahrzeit" (Yiddish: יאָרצײַט yortsayt ) itself means "anniversary" (or more specifically "anniversary [of a person's death]") in Yiddish, originating from German Jahr, year, and Zeit, time.

In Hebrew, the candles are also called Ner Neshama – a candle for the soul.

== Remembrance ==
The use of a yahrzeit candle is a widely practiced custom, where mourners light a yahrzeit candle that burns for 24 hours, on the anniversary of the death on the Hebrew calendar. Many Jews who are otherwise unobservant follow this custom. It is customary to light the candle inside one's home, or near the grave of the deceased.

The candle is also lit before Yom Kippur and there are also customs to light a yahrzeit candle on the dates when the yizkor prayer is said in synagogue (Yom Kippur, Shemini Atzeret, final day of Pesach, and Shavuot). Some also light before the Holocaust Remembrance Day ceremony (Yom HaShoah).

In all cases, the candle is lit before sundown. This is because in Judaism, days begin at sundown, in accordance with Genesis, e.g., 1:5:5 And God called the light Day, and the darkness he called Night. And the evening and the morning were the first day.)

It is also customary to light the candle during the shiva, usually a larger one that lasts the entire seven days. In the absence of a seven-day Shiva candle, seven yahrzeit candles can be lit on successive days (but not in violation of Shabbat).

Today, some people use an electric yahrzeit candle that plugs into the wall instead of a candle for safety reasons, such as in a hospital.

=== Sources ===
The custom of lighting a yahrzeit candle comes from the Book of Proverbs 20:27 "The soul of man is a candle of the Lord."

A candle similarly appears in the midrashic description of Aaron's death:

[God] said to [Aaron]: "Enter the cave", and he entered. He saw a bed made and a candle burning. [God] said to him, "Go up on the bed", and he went up. "Spread out your hands", and he spread out his hands. "Close your mouth", and he closed his mouth. "Close your eyes", and he closed his eyes. Moses immediately desired that his death would occur the same way.

== Holidays ==
Yahrzeit candles are also commonly used on holidays, for reasons of convenience rather than symbolism.

On Passover, Shavuot, Sukkot, and Rosh Hashana, it is forbidden to light a new fire, but permitted to light one flame from an existing flame for certain purposes (like cooking). Therefore, a yahrzeit candle (or other long-lasting candle) is lit before the holiday, so that a flame is available in case of need. Similarly, havdalah after Yom Kippur requires a fire that has burned since before the holiday, and yahrzeit candles are often used for this purpose as well.

48 hour and 72 hour candles have also been manufactured, for holidays that last more than one day.

== In culture ==
- At the public memorial outside the Tree of Life synagogue in Pittsburgh on 28 October 2018, a mourner placed a yahrzeit candle that he had originally kept for his father.
- After Israeli Prime Minister Yitzhak Rabin was assassinated in 1995, the young people who came to mourn Rabin at the Kings of Israel Square where he was killed were dubbed the "Youth of the Candles" (נוער הנרות, noar hanerot) after the many yahrzeit candles they lit.
- Yahrzeit candles are often lit by many Jewish communities on Yom HaShoah (Holocaust Remembrance Day) in remembrance of those who were murdered in the Holocaust.
- In the American television series The Nanny, the children say in the 1998 episode "Sara's Parents" that Fran has them light a yahrzeit candle for their late mother on her birthday.
- The 2009 CSI: NY episode "Yahrzeit" ends with Hannah Schnitzler and Mac Taylor lighting a memorial candle for deceased relatives.
- In the 2016 Difficult People episode "High Alert", a character searches for a yahrzeit candle to commemorate his father; another character later identifies one at a party.
- In the 2017 film Menashe, the title character lights a yahrzeit candle.
- In the 2022 Undone episode "Rectify", the family lights a yahrzeit candle on the anniversary of Ruchel's death.
- In Paul Levitz's comic "Tradition", published in the 2002 anthology 9-11: The World's Finest Comic Book Writers & Artists Tell Stories to Remember, a woman and child light a yahrzeit candle while listening to a telephone message from a person presumed to have died in the September 11 attacks.
- In MetaMaus, Art Spiegelman describes his graphic memoir Maus as a "three-hundred-page yahrzeit candle", using the candle as a metaphor for remembering his parents and other victims of the Holocaust.
- At a Yom HaShoah event at Yeshiva University on 18 April 2023, students lit six yahrzeit candles in memory of Holocaust victims.

== Gallery ==
A memorial lantern on a grave at Hills of Eternity Cemetery in Seattle, United States

Six memorial candles lit at a Holocaust remembrance ceremony in Wiesbaden, Germany

A grave lantern at the New Jewish Cemetery in Wrocław, Poland

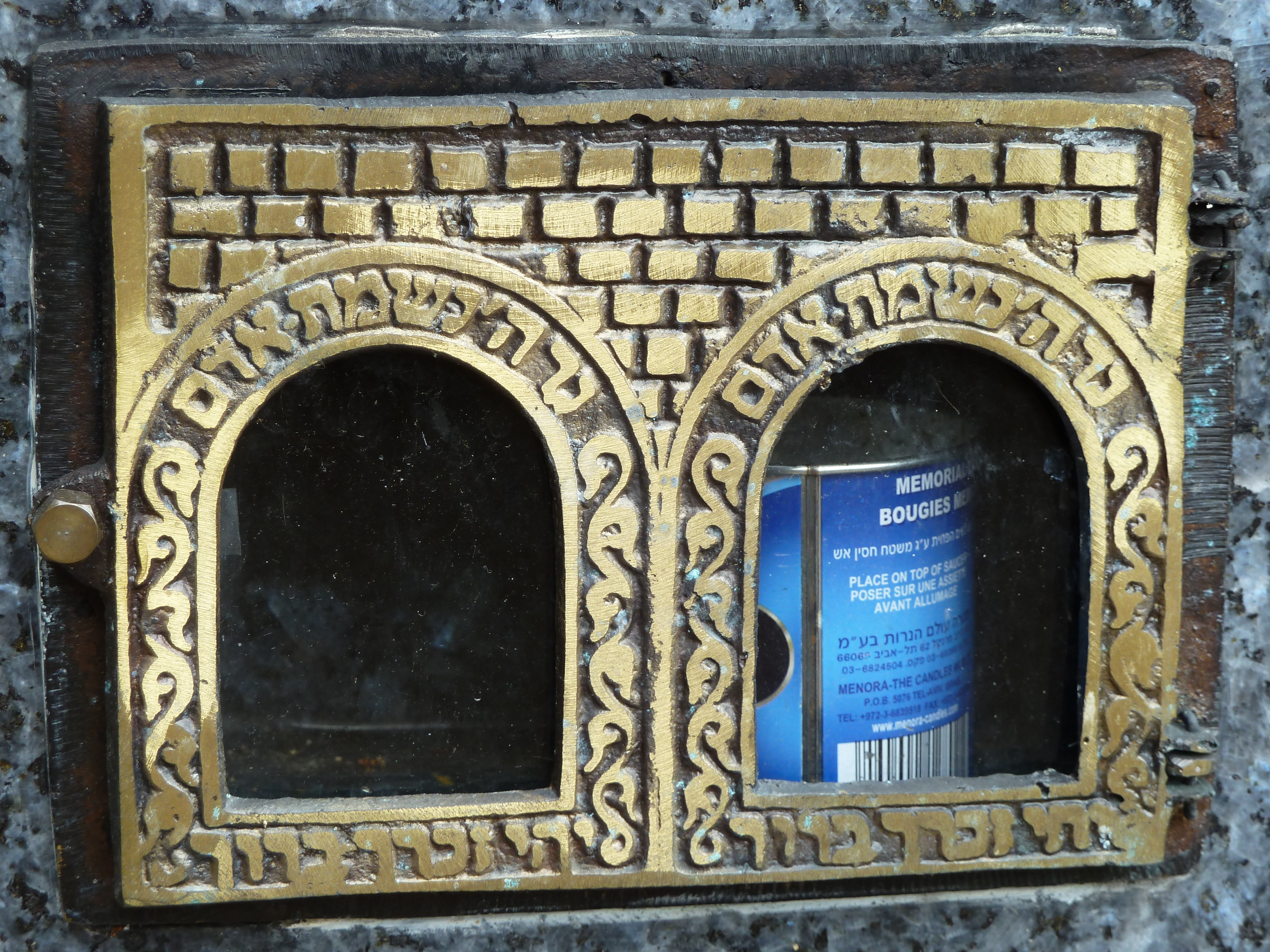
A memorial candle and a Hebrew inscription from Proverbs 20:27 at Montparnasse Cemetery in Paris, France

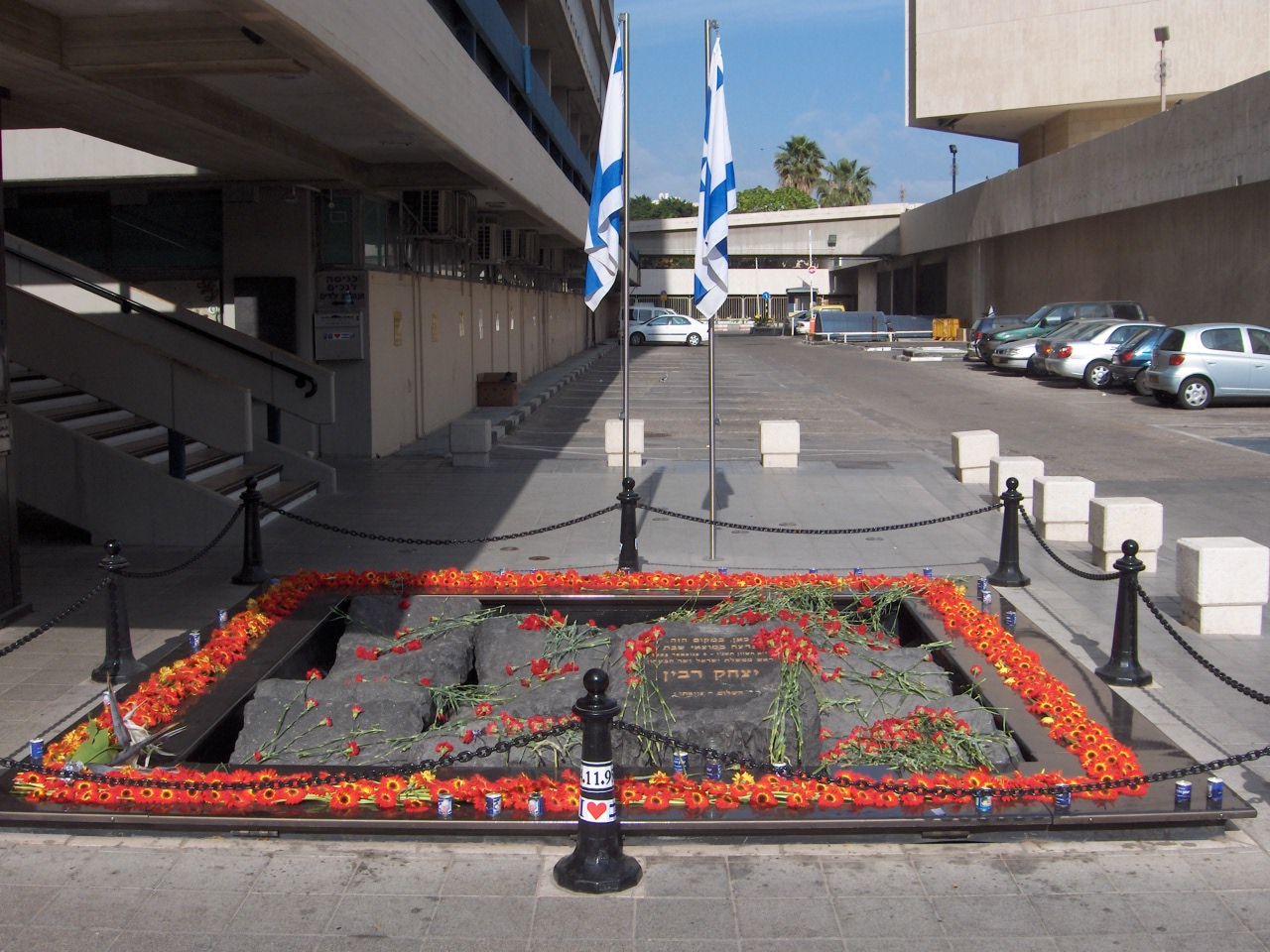
The assassination site of Israeli Prime Minister Yitzchak Rabin. It is usually filled with yahrzeit candles and flowers.

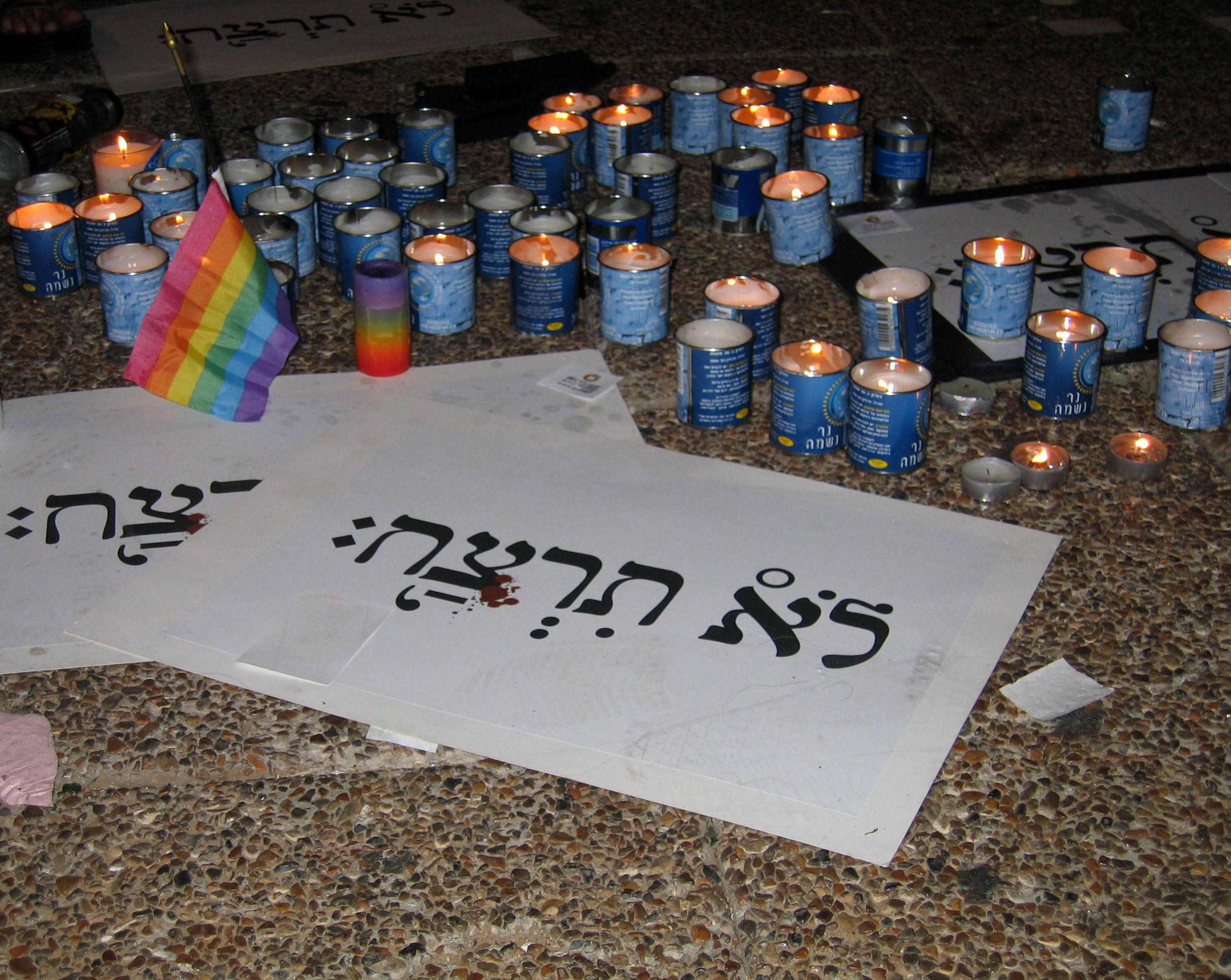
Yahrzeit candles and signs entitled "You shall not murder" at a solidarity rally at Rabin Square for the victims of the 2009 Tel Aviv gay centre shooting

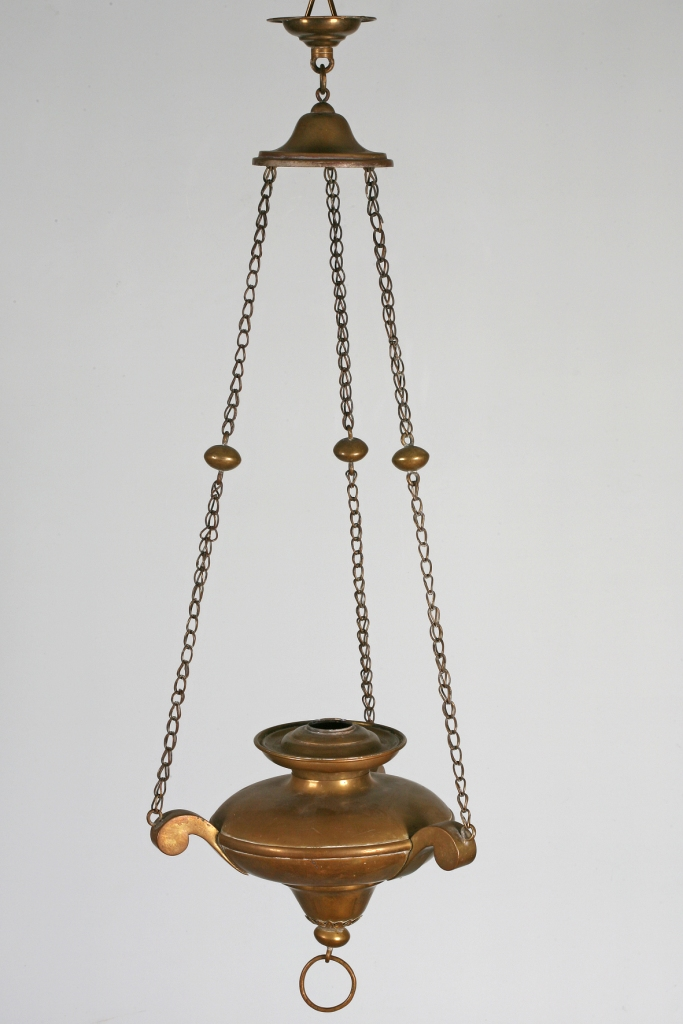
Yahrzeitlicht from Lengnau in Aargau (Switzerland), 1830, now in the Jewish Museum of Switzerland

== See also ==
- Bereavement in Judaism
- Grave candle
- Yahrtzeit
