= Pelusia =

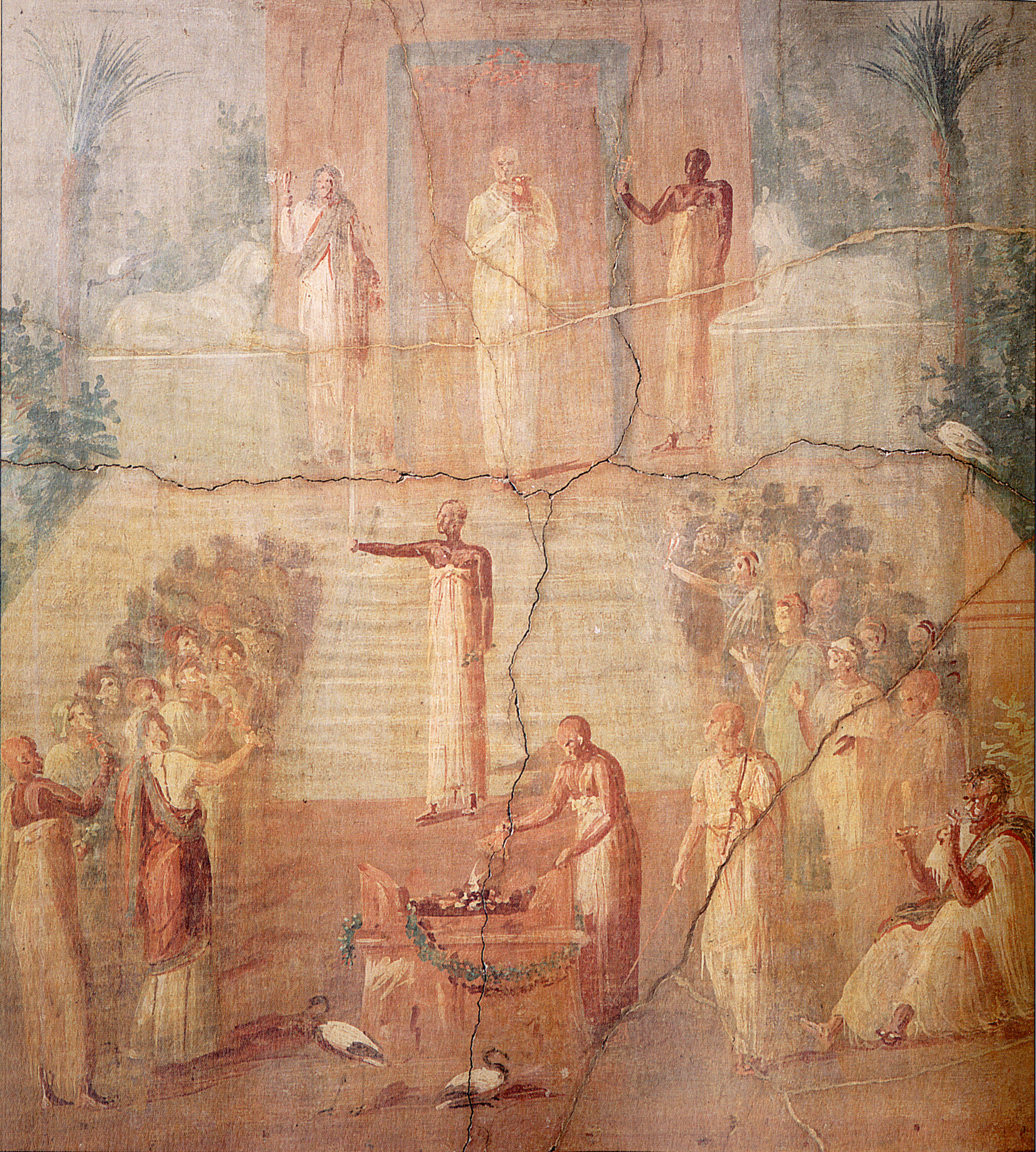
Wall painting from Herculaneum depicting an idealized ceremony of Isis: the priest at top center holds a jar thought to contain Nile water, while some of the attendants carry water jugs

In the Roman Empire, the Pelusia was a religious festival held March 20 in honor of Isis and her child Harpocrates. It would have coincided with the second day of the Quinquatria, a five-day festival to Minerva. The holiday was not a part of the Roman calendar before the mid-1st century AD, but had been added by the time of Marcus Aurelius (161–180). It is preserved in the Calendar of Filocalus (354 AD) as an official holiday.

The Byzantine scholar John Lydus (6th century) explains the festival as commemorating the "mud" from the flooding of the Nile, which generates fertility and ends hunger and drought, and was probably thought to be embodied by the birth of Harpocrates, who in art is depicted emerging from mud and bearing a cornucopia.

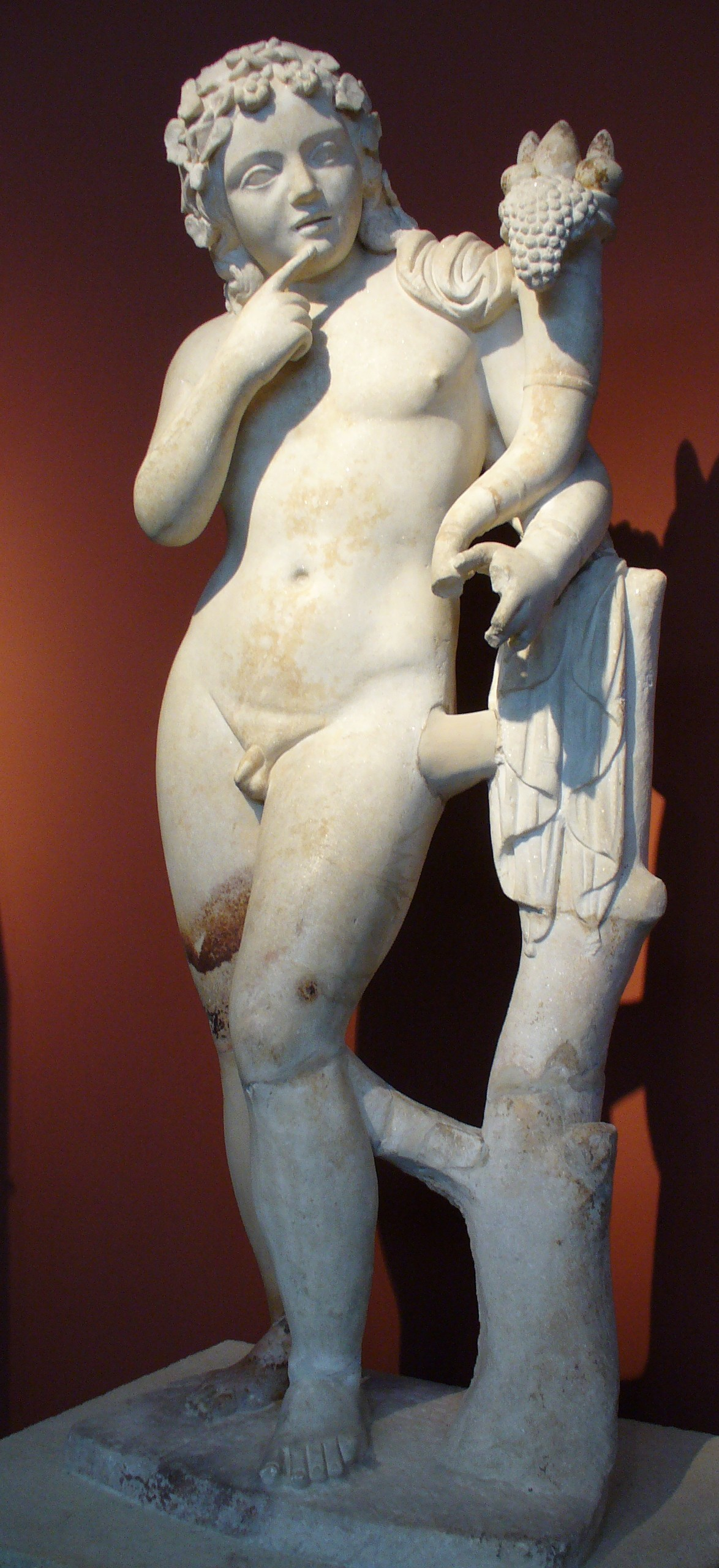
Harpocrates with a cornucopia (3rd century AD)

Participants in the Pelusia were sprinkled with water in order to obtain rebirth (regeneratio) and immunity from offenses to the gods (impunitas periurorum). The sprinkling is thought to mimic the symbolic effect of the flooding, and water from the Nile itself may have been used as a form of "holy water" as it was in other ceremonies of Isis brought to Rome. In Christian discourse of the time, regeneratio was used in connection with baptism. The Christian polemicist Tertullian (d. ca. 225) contrasts the rites of Pelusia with what he sees as the superior efficacy of baptism.

In Egypt, the Pelusia of March 20 marked the beginning of the sailing season. The day was under the protection of Isis and Serapis.

== See also ==
- Isidis Navigium, the "sailing" festival of Isis on March 5
- Lychnapsia, lamp-lighting for Isis
