= Arab and Druze Scouts Movement =

Israeli Arab and Druze scout movement

- Affiliation: World Association of Girl Guides and Girl Scouts; World Organization of the Scout Movement

The Arab and Druze Scouts Movement is a coeducational member of the Israel Boy and Girl Scouts Federation. The federation consists of Arab and Druze troops.

== Member organizations ==
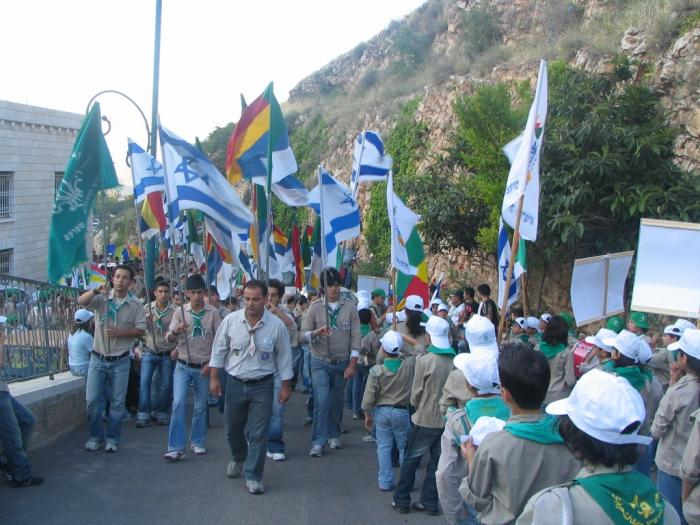
Druze Scouts march to Jethro's tomb

The members of the federation are:

- Druze Scouts Association - 5,000 members; the emblem features the Druze star and torch.
- Catholic Scout Association in Israel - 3,000 members; the emblem features the Christian cross in Palestinian colors.
- Orthodox Christian Scout Association - 2,500 members; the emblem features the wreath from the flag of the United Nations.
- Israel Arab Scouts Association - 2,000 members.

== See also ==
- Palestinian Scout Association
