= Scouting and Guiding in Palestine =

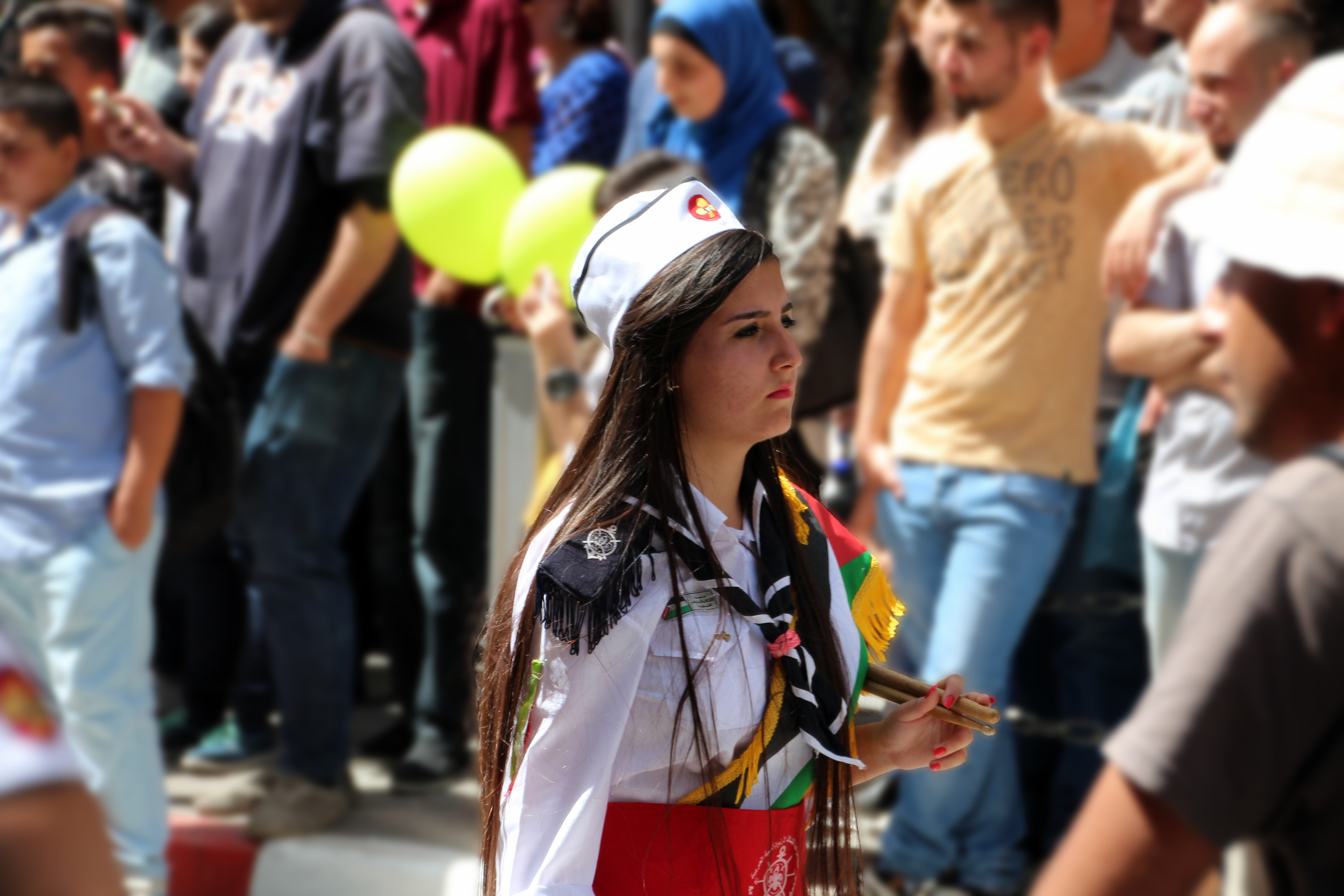
Drummer from the Arab Orthodox Scout Group of Gaza during a procession in Ramallah

The Scout and Guide movement in the State of Palestine is served by the Palestinian Scout Association, member of the World Organization of the Scout Movement and the World Association of Girl Guides and Girl Scouts. The Scout and Guide movement in the State of Palestine can be traced back to the earliest times in Scouting.

The Girl Guides of Palestine, formerly working towards World Association of Girl Guides and Girl Scouts membership, are no longer active.

== International Scouting units in Palestine ==
In addition, there are American Boy Scouts in Gaza, serving as Lone Scouts linked to the Direct Service branch of the Boy Scouts of America, which supports units around the world.

== See also ==
- Israel Boy and Girl Scouts Federation
