= Bethlehem Bible College =

College in Bethlehem, West Bank, Palestine

Coordinates: 31°42′54.8″N 35°12′1.6″E

Bethlehem Bible College is a Christian evangelical college, founded in 1979 in Bethlehem, under Israeli military occupation. It was created to prepare Christian leaders to serve Arab churches and society in the Holy Land. It trains students to model Christ-centeredness, humility and biblical wholeness. The college uses Arabic as its primary language of instruction, and all courses are accredited through MEATE (Middle East Association for Theological Education), the Palestinian Ministry of Higher Education and several international theological organizations.

== History ==
Bethlehem Bible College was founded by Bishara Awad in 1979. The college moved to new buildings on Hebron Road in the 1990s. As of June 2016, the college had between 250 and 275 students. As of 2018, the President is Jack Sara, with Awad as President Emeritus.

The college has extensions in Nazareth and Gaza, as well as offering online degrees. It has also become accredited by the Palestinian National Authority.

== Mission ==
Bethlehem Bible College exists to train people to serve Christ in the world while advocating a Palestinian evangelical perspective by modeling Christ through community development. The college conducts seminars and lectures to give a "Biblical alternative to Christian Zionism."

The college organises a conference called Christ at the Checkpoint, which has been held every two years since 2010. The purpose is to bring together Christian leaders from all around the world to look at the wall, settlements, checkpoints and refugee camps and "examine the teachings of Christ on themes such as peace, justice and God's love to all races." The 2018 conference was attended by over 400 people, with 210 international attendees including Bishop Efraim Tendero, head of the World Evangelical Alliance. It has received criticism for being "anti-Israel" and "pushing the nationalistic Palestinian agenda."
