= Evangelical Fellowship of Mexico =

- Founded: 1982
- Type: Evangelical organization
- Purpose: Evangelical Christianity
- Location: Mexico
- Website: www.conemex.org

The Evangelical Fellowship of Mexico (Confraternidad Evangélica de México, CONEMEX) is a national evangelical alliance in Mexico and member of the World Evangelical Alliance. CONEMEX works for unity and public relations.

== History ==
CONEMEX was founded in 1982, one month after CONELA, its counterpart for all Latin America. Ideologically organization traces its roots back to the 1974 Lausanne conference of Evangelicals all over the world. By 1990 CONEMEX claimed to represent some ten thousand Evangelical churches.
