= Spanish Evangelical Alliance =

Spanish evangelical Christian organisation

- Founded: 1877
- Type: Evangelical organization
- Purpose: Evangelical Christianity
- Headquarters: Barcelona, Spain
- Location: Spain
- Website: alianzaevangelica.es

The Spanish Evangelical Alliance (Spanish: Alianza Evangélica Española, AEE) is a national evangelical alliance in Spain and member of the World Evangelical Alliance.

== History ==
Spanish Evangelical Alliance is founded in 1877.
