= Austrian Evangelical Alliance =

Austrian evangelical Christian organisation

- Founded: 1975
- Type: Evangelical organization
- Purpose: Evangelical Christianity
- Location: Austria
- Website: www.evangelischeallianz.at

The Austrian Evangelical Alliance (German: Österreichische Evangelische Allianz, ÖEA) is a national evangelical alliance in Austria and member of the World Evangelical Alliance.

== History ==
The roots of the Evangelical Alliance in Austria can be traced back to 1863 when the Alliance Prayer Week was first conducted in the country. Austrian Evangelical Alliance was officially founded in 1975.

== Regional alliances ==
- EA Enns- / Paltental
- EA Graz
- EA Klagenfurt
- EA Linz und Umgebung
- EA Mostviertel
- EA Salzburg
- EA Wien

== Members denominations ==
- Bruderhof Church Austria
- Calvary Chapel - Christian Church Spittal/Drau
- Denton Bible Church
- Evangelical Free Church Deutschlandsberg
- Evangelical Free Church Kapfenberg/Bruck
- Evangelical Church Döbling
- Evangelical Church Villach
- Evangelical parish A.B.u.H.B. Melk-Scheibbs
- Evangelical parish A.B. Schladming
- Evangelical parish A.B. Thening
- Evangelical parish A.u.H.B. St. Pölten
- Federation of Evangelical Churches in Austria
- Federation of Baptist Churches in Austria
- Feuerhaus Christian Congregation
- Free Christian Community - Pentecostal Community
- Free Christian Community Bürmoos
- Free Christian Community Forum Wien
- Free Christian Community Langenegg
- Free Christian Community Linz
- Free Christian Community Salzburg
- Free Christian Community Schladming
- Free Christian Community Wels
- Free Christian Community WunderWerk
- Free Christian Community Schwaz
- Free Evangelical Church Arnoldstein
- Free Church Neue Heimat
- Free Churches in Austria
- Glory Worship Centre
- Mennonite Free Church Wels
- Pentecostal Church Church of God Austria
- The Salvation Army
- Vienna Christian Centre
- Vineyard Church Graz
- Vineyard Church Vienna
- Vineyard Linz - Christian Church
