= ICSA =

The acronym ICSA may refer to:

- International Courier Services Association
- International Customer Service Association
- Institute of Chartered Secretaries and Administrators
- International Cultic Studies Association
- International Computer Security Association
- Intercollegiate Sailing Association
- Intercollegiate Chinese for Social Action
- Catholic Scout Association in Israel
- International Chinese Statistical Association
- International Coalition for Sustainable Aviation
