= OCSA =

Ocsa or OCSA may refer to:

- Ócsa
- Orange County School of the Arts
- Osceola County School for the Arts
- Order of the Canons Regular of Saint Augustine
- Orthodox Christian Scout Association
