= Israel Boy and Girl Scouts Federation =

Federation of Scout Organizations in Israel

- Native name (in Hebrew): התאחדות הצופים והצופות בישראל
- Headquarters: Philips House
- Location: Tel Aviv, Israel
- Country: Israel
- Founded: 1954
- Membership: 90,000
- President: Moris Zilca
- Chief Commissioner: Eran Glazer
- Affiliation: World Association of Girl Guides and Girl Scouts; World Organization of the Scout Movement
- Website www.isf-shalom.org

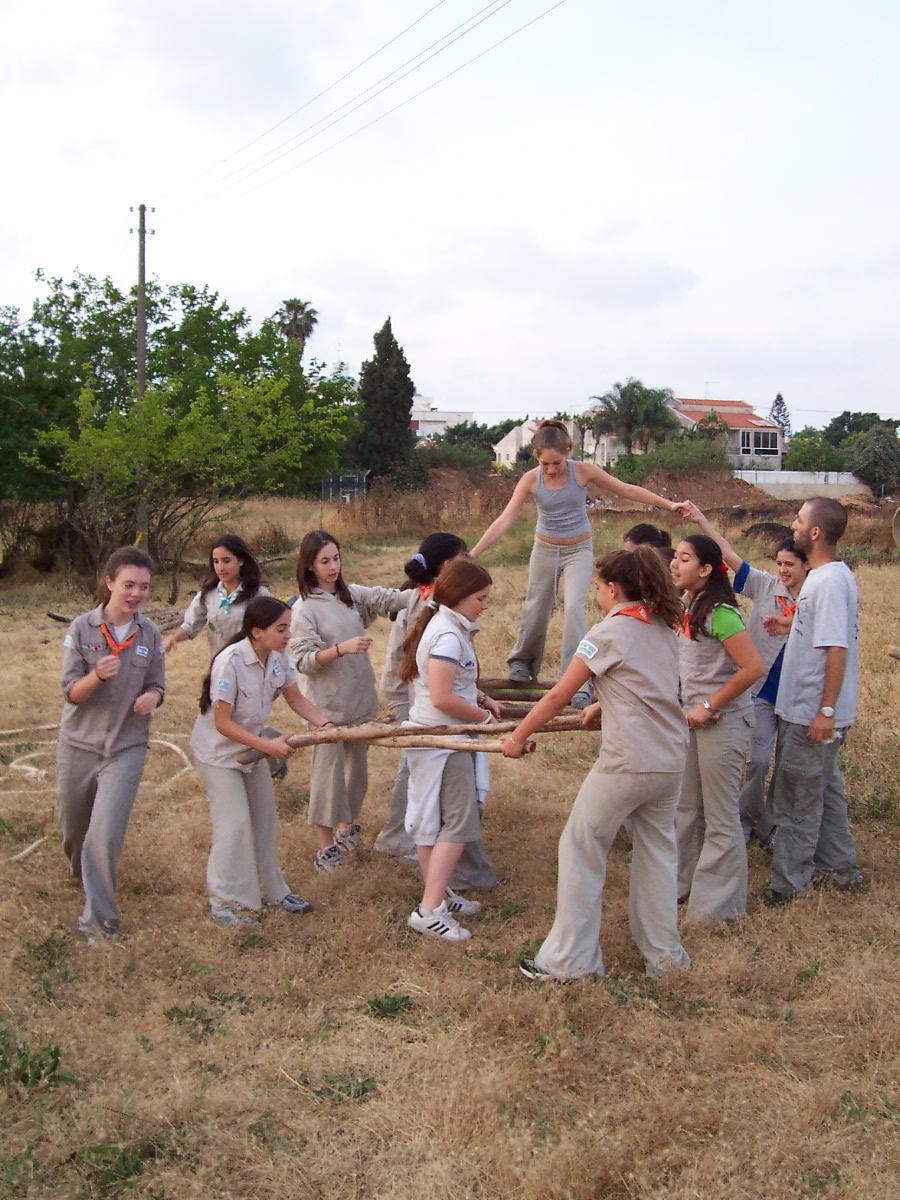
Israeli Scouts during an activity

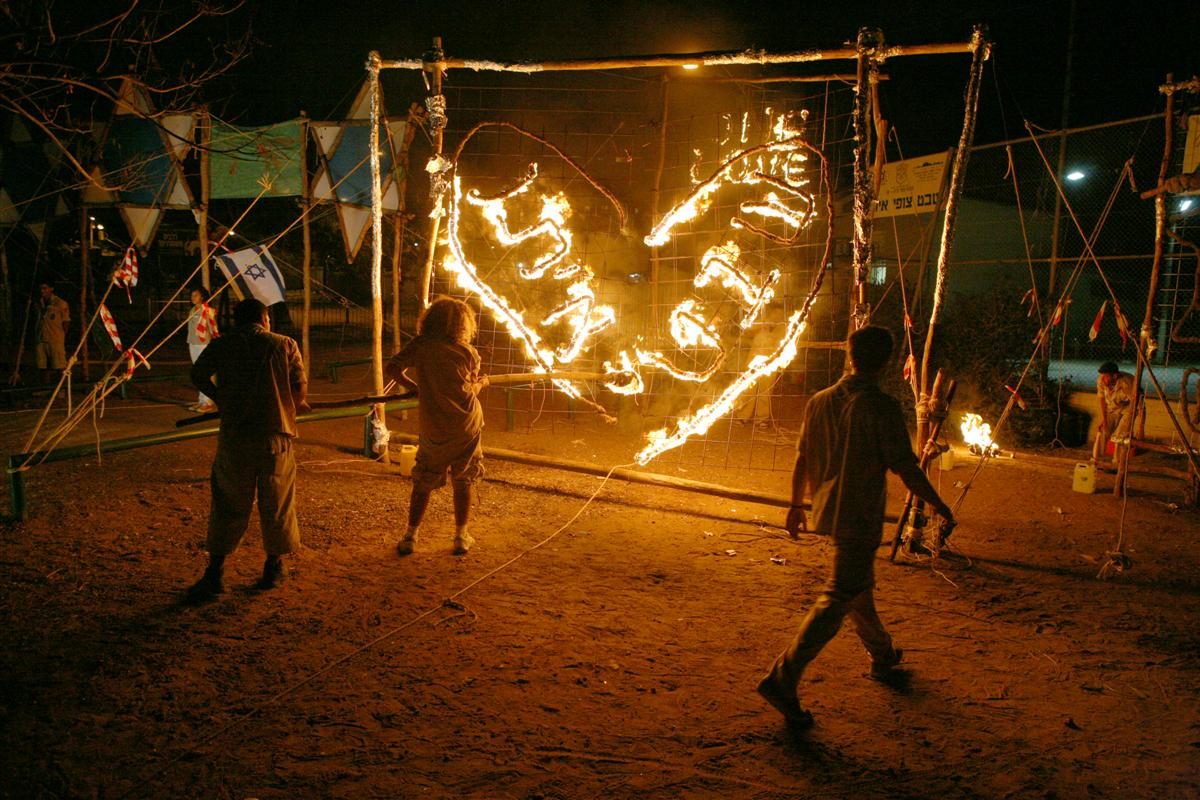
Fire ceremony, Shevet Eitan

The Israel Boy and Girl Scouts Federation (Hebrew: התאחדות הצופים והצופות בישראל, Hit'ahdut HaTzofim VeHaTzofot BeYisrael) is Israel's federation of the five Scouting organizations in Israel, sorted by religious affiliation. Some 90,000 boys and girls belong to organizations in the federation.

== History ==
The first Scout and Guide groups were founded in 1919. The federation was created in 1954 under the sponsorship of the Ministry of Education. The Israeli Scouts movement became a member of the World Organization of the Scout Movement in 1951, after the establishment of the State of Israel and became a member of the World Association of Girl Guides and Girl Scouts in 1963.

In 2009, Tzofim celebrated its 90th birthday. To mark the occasion, Israel's Prime Minister Benjamin Netanyahu met members of Tzofim at his office, where he told stories of his youth in the Modi'in troop in Jerusalem.

Since 1973, 10-member troupes of scouts from the Tzofim tour Jewish communities in North America, performing concerts at Jewish summer camps, community centers, hospitals, nursing homes, and synagogues as part of the Tzofim Friendship Caravan.

== Principles ==
Scout troops in Israel have always been coeducational. The federation in Israel is separated based on religious affiiliation: secular Jews, religious Jews, Muslim Arab, Christian Arab, and Druze scouts. Tzofim is open to everyone regardless of race, color, creed, or socioeconomic standing. Israeli Scouts come from all sectors of Israeli society.

The Federation goals:

- Serving as the umbrella organization for all the Scouting bodies in Israel.
- Strengthening the government standing of the Scouts movement in Israel.
- Generating channels of cooperation among all the Scouting organizations, especially among the Hebrew, Arab and Druze Scouts.
- Reinforcing education on social values, coexistence and tolerance among Arabs, Jews and Druze, loyalty to the nation and fostering feelings of justice, mutual aid, and interpersonal relations based on truth and respect, with an eye to self-fulfillment.
- Developing and coordinating the relationship between the Scouts in Israel and the World Organization of the Scout Movement and Scouts movements in various countries.
- Helping advance and nurture the level of Scouting among the youth populations in the various Scouts organizations, to take responsibility for organizing and running Scouts troops.

== Member organizations ==
The members of the federation are:

- Hebrew Scouts Movement in Israel - 80,000 members
- Arab and Druze Scouts Movement - 12,500 members
- Israel Druze Scouts Association - 5,000 members
- Catholic Scout Association in Israel - 3,000 members
- Christian Orthodox Scout Association - 2,500 members
- Israel Arab Scouts for Peace Association - 2,000 members

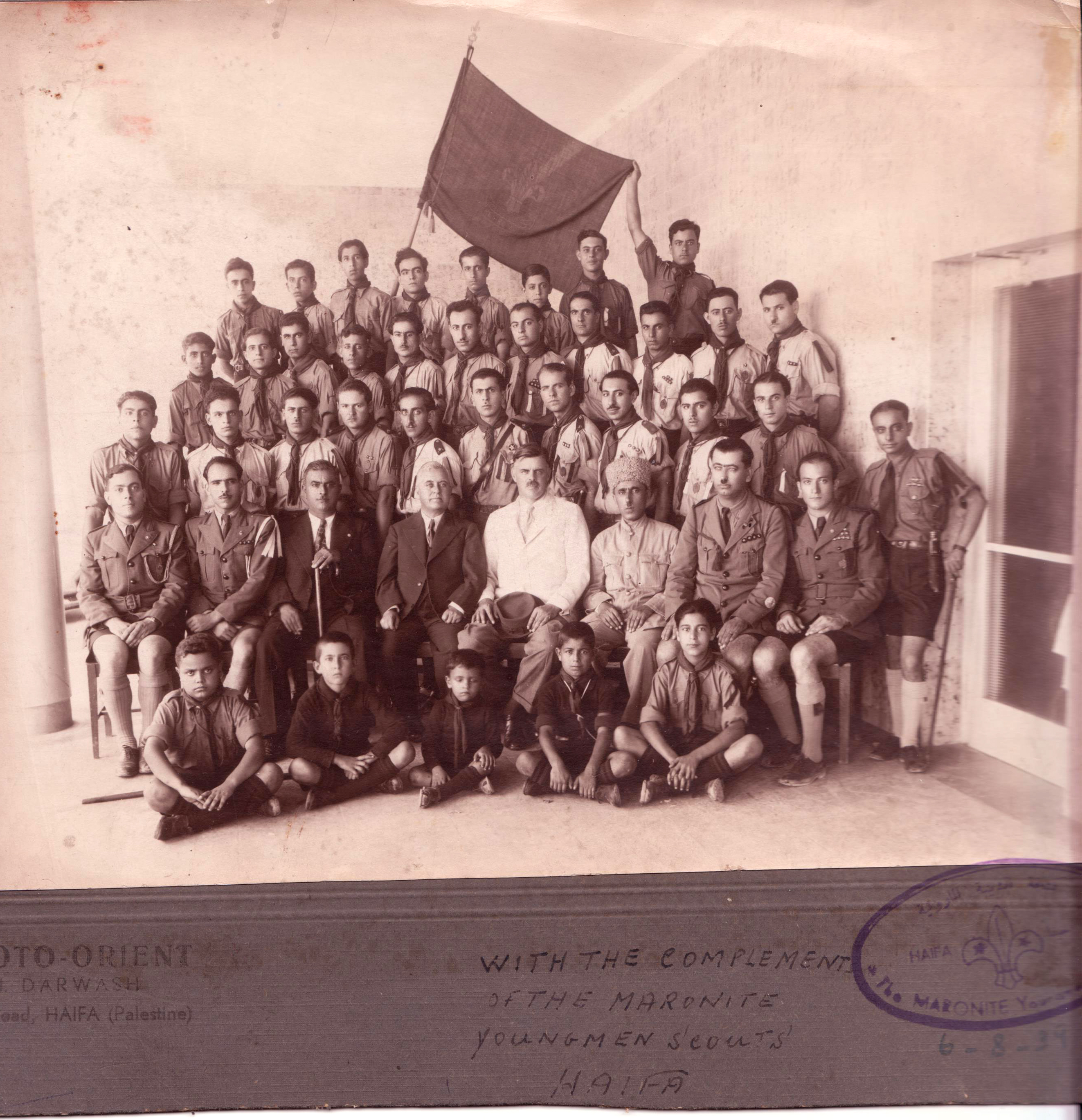
Haifa Maronite Boy Scouts, 1939. Center: Dr John Macqueen Chief Medical Officer for Haifa

== The Federation Institutions ==
1. The Federation Council, composed of 66 members, representing in proportion to the various organizations by size, is the supreme body of the Federation. (The Hebrew Scouts Movement has absolute majority in the Council.)
2. The Executive Committee, the body that manages the association.
3. The Coordinators Forum, consisting the Federation director and all secretaries-general from the various organizations.
4. The secretariat, which is responsible for the ongoing operation.

The Federation's constitution was written in 1954 and defined the roles of the federation and its principles, the Scout's promise and the Scouting principles, the movement membership, internal organization, the Federation Council and more, and is fully binding document is the associations membership of the Federation. The Constitution stated that every organization is autonomous and may conduct his affairs as it sees fit as long as injury does not constitute an expressed or implied by the principles formulated in the Constitution of the Federation.

The Federation exists under the laws of the State of Israel - "Scouts Ordinance (New Version) 1978" which states that the federation is a corporation, it will operate according to the Constitution approved by the Minister of Education, a person can call himself a Scout only if such according to the constitution of the federation, and the authority to use the symbols of Scouting and uniforms is by the federation. The law even sets a month prison sentence or a fine of IL150 who contravenes the provisions, including phishing (selling or wearing Scouts uniforms or badges) or exercise of authority that the Constitution of the Federation. this command, which has no parallel in relation to other symbols of youth movements, is a legacy from the days of the British Mandate.

Functionaries in the Federation:

- Chairman of the Federation (chief commissioner)
- International Commissioner WOSM and International Commissioner WAGGGS
- Treasurer of the Federation
- Director of the Federation
- Secretary of the Federation

There are also other officials in accordance with the federation's various projects.
