= Steven Khoury =

Palestinian pastor and author

Reverend Steven Khoury
- ستيفن نعيم خوري
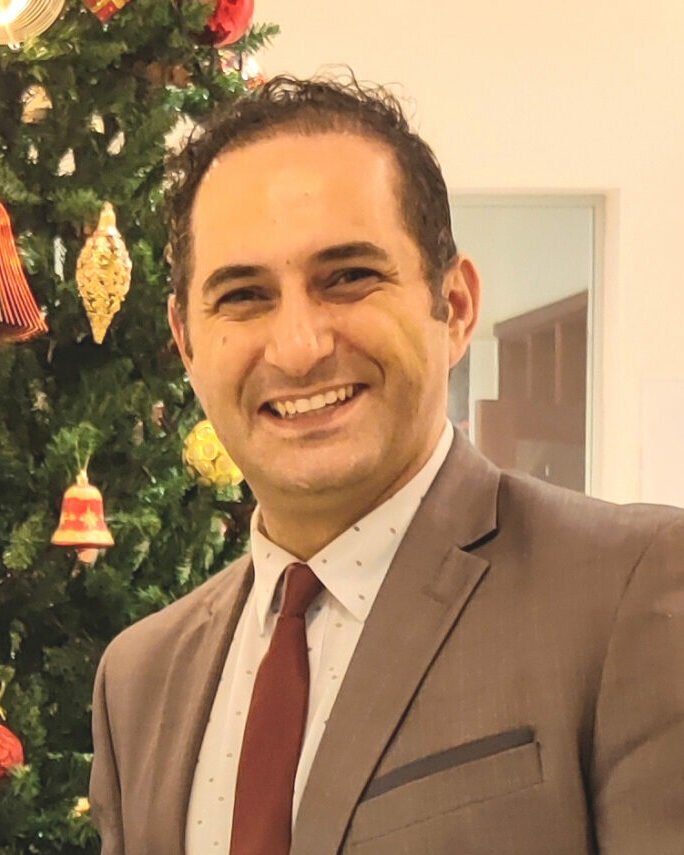
- Steven Khoury, December 2021
- Born: Jerusalem
- Education: Pastoral Ministry and Theology (B.A.)
- Alma mater: Baptist Bible College
- Occupations: Pastor; Author
- Organization: Holy Land Missions
- Website: holylandmissions.org

Rev. Steven Naim Khoury (Arabic: ستيفن نعيم خوري) is a Palestinian Arab pastor and author. He is the pastor of The First Baptist Church in Bethlehem and Calvary Church in Jerusalem. Khoury is the president of the "Holy Land Missions" organization.

== Biography ==
Steven Naim Khoury was born in Jerusalem. His father, Dr. Naim Khoury, is the founding pastor of First Baptist Church in Bethlehem. Khoury grew up in Bethlehem and attended Baptist Bible College in Springfield, Missouri, where he earned a bachelor's degree in pastoral ministry and theology.

== Career ==
Khoury is the president of "Holy Land Missions", a non-profit organization which was established in 1979 by his family. The organization provides health and financial aid to needy families in the region and supports the largest evangelical Arab ministries in the Holy Land.

Steven Khoury is the pastor of The First Baptist Church in Bethlehem which was established by his father, Dr. Naim Khoury. He is also the pastor of Calvary Church in Jerusalem.

As a Christian pastor he has faced persecution, including being attacked for his beliefs. His uncle was murdered, his father was shot at on multiple occasions and his religious establishments have been firebombed and defaced.

In the late 2000s, following a meeting with David Nekrutman of the Center for Jewish–Christian Understanding and Cooperation (CJCUC), the two decided work together to help the disadvantaged and persecuted Christian community living in Bethlehem and its surrounding areas. Initially, it was facilitated by the two through the center via a food voucher program and was later instituted through the center's "Blessing Bethlehem" aid organization which was established in 2016.

In 2012, Khoury was informed by Palestinian Authority officials that his church, The First Baptist Church in Bethlehem, lacked the authority to function as a religious institution under PA jurisdiction.

In July 2014, the congregation of Calvary Baptist Church, which Khoury ministers, was evicted out of their building in the Shuafat area of Eastern Jerusalem after Islamists threatened their landlord. This eviction came eight years after Khoury's organization "Holy Land Missions" was forced to close another church in Beit Hanina in 2006.

In January 2020, Khoury called out for peace following U.S. President Donald Trump's "Deal of the Century", this in contrast to the Palestinian Authority which called out for mass demonstrations and violence.

In 2023, Khoury, along with members of The Isaiah Projects organization, led a humanitarian effort to save Dina, a Gazan woman whose husband was murdered over a property dispute. The joint effort helped to secure safe passage for Dina from Gaza to Bethlehem in the West Bank.

== Works ==
- Diplomatic Christianity (2008) – ASIN B002JMEV20
- In the Backyard of Jesus (2012) – ISBN 978-0882640549

== See also ==
- Munther Isaac
