= Tzofim Friendship Caravan =

Musical troupe of the Israeli scouts

The Tzofim Friendship Caravan is a troupe of 10 members of the Israel Boy and Girl Scouts Federation who tour Jewish communities in North America. The program, which began in 1973, aims to strengthen the connection between Israel and Jews in the diaspora.

== History ==
The caravan was founded in 1973. After a 3-year hiatus, the caravan returned to the United States in 2023 for its 50th anniversary. The caravan is supported by the Jewish National Fund. The goal of the caravan is to showcase Israeli culture and its cultural diversity and to strengthen the connection between Israeli and diaspora Jews.

Some participants in the caravan later became celebrities in Israel, including singer Aya Korem, actress Rotem Abuhav, and journalist Yuna Leibzon.

== Troupe ==
The caravan consists of three troupes of 10 16- and 17-year-old members of the Israel Boy and Girl Scouts Federation and two leaders, who travel across North America for 3 months over the summer each year, performing 45-minute concerts at Jewish summer camps, community centers, hospitals, nursing homes, and synagogues. The performances are in Hebrew, English, and Yiddish, and the signers dress in official scout uniforms, Middle Eastern clothing, and blue-and-white outfits.

Members of the caravan are chosen based on their performing talents, maturity, and English fluency. After selection for the caravan, they spend a year training and rehearsing.

The scouts stay at the homes of local Jewish families and synagogues, and community visits of the caravan are sponsored by the local Jewish federation, Jewish community center, and Boy Scouts of America.
