= Fayeq Hamdi Tahboub =

Palestinian scouting official

Fayeq Hamdi Tahboub (Arabic: فائق حمدي طهبوب) serves as the International Commissioner of the Palestinian Scout Association.

In 1998, Tahboub was awarded the 267th Bronze Wolf, the only distinction of the World Organization of the Scout Movement, awarded by the World Scout Committee for exceptional services to world Scouting.
