= Munther Isaac =

Palestinian pastor, author, and theologian

Reverend Doctor Munther Isaac
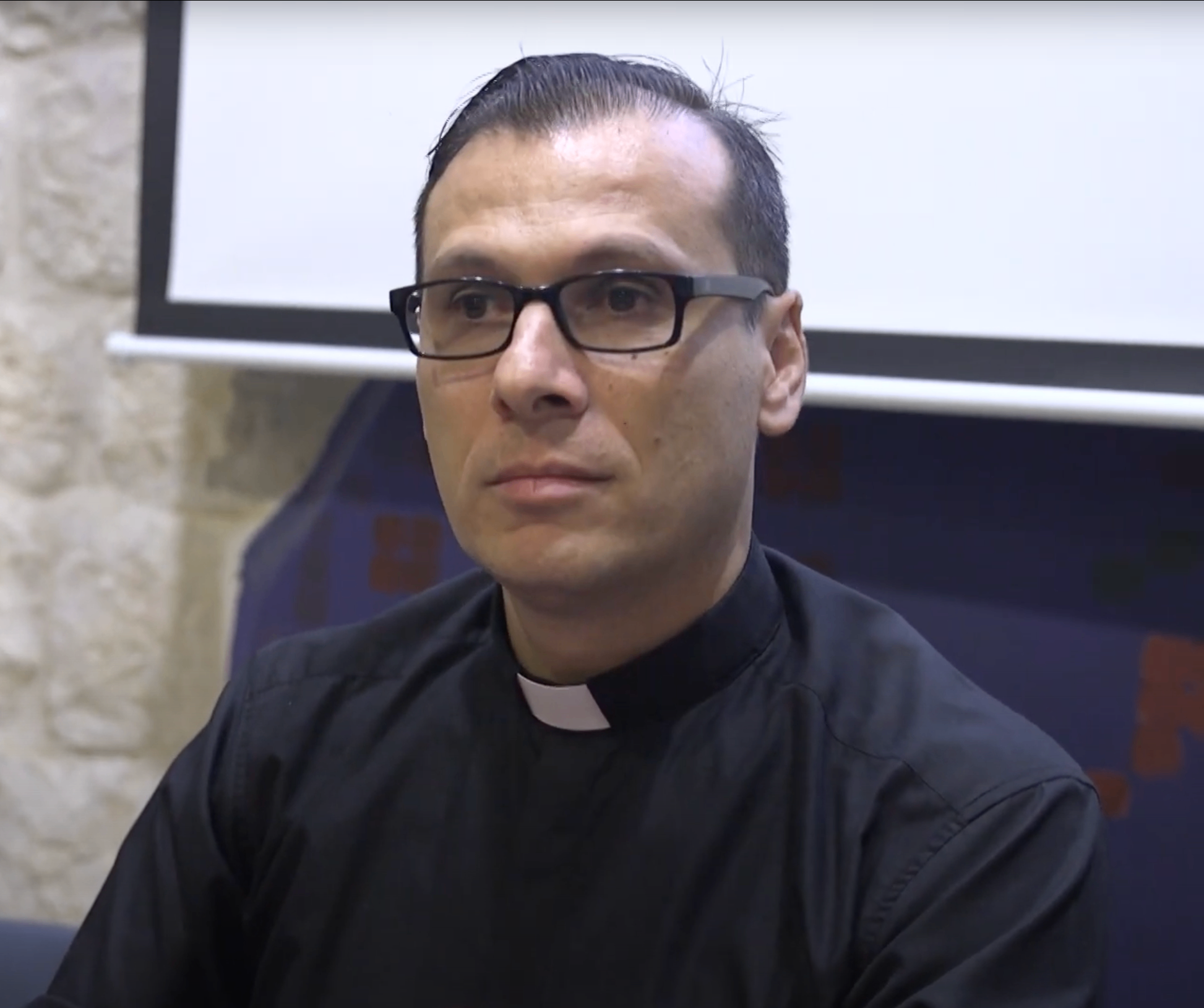
- Native name: منذر إسحق
- Church: Christmas Lutheran Church – Bethlehem, The Evangelical Lutheran Church – Beit Sahour
- Other posts: Director of Christ at the Checkpoint Conference, Academic Dean of Bethlehem Bible College

Orders
- Ordination: 2016

Personal details
- Born: 1979 (age 46–47) Beit Sahour, Palestine
- Denomination: Lutheran (Evangelical Lutheran Church in Jordan and the Holy Land)
- Profession: pastor; author; theologian
- Education: Birzeit University (BS), Westminster Theological Seminary (MA), Oxford Centre for Mission Studies (PhD)

Munther Isaac (born 1979) is a Palestinian Christian pastor, author, and theologian based in the West Bank. For some time, Isaac has vocally criticized the Israeli government's treatment of Palestinians and Christian Zionist support for Israel. He became more widely known throughout the world due to his activism during the Gaza war, including media appearances, speaking tours, and social media posts. In December 2023, his church's nativity scene depicting Jesus lying on a pile of rubble and his sermon "Christ in the Rubble: A Liturgy of Lament" went viral. It became the title of a 2025 book, Christ in the Rubble: Faith, the Bible, and the Genocide in Gaza.

Raised in Beit Sahour, he completed a PhD at the Oxford Centre for Mission Studies, later becoming the director of the Christ at the Checkpoint conference and the academic dean of Bethlehem Bible College. Ordained to the Evangelical Lutheran Church in Jordan and the Holy Land in 2016, he currently pastors two churches, including the Christmas Lutheran Church in Bethlehem. Considered a prominent Palestinian theologian and pastor, Isaac has published several books, including The Other Side of the Wall: A Palestinian Christian Narrative of Lament and Hope (2020).

== Early life and education ==
Isaac was born in 1979 in Beit Sahour, Palestine, into an Orthodox Christian family. As a child, Isaac lived through the First Intifada and witnessed protests and curfews. He recalls Israeli soldiers seizing residents' possessions in Beit Sahour, including his family's car, in response to a tax strike the residents organized. He first joined the Bethlehem Evangelical Presbyterian Church at the age of 10.

Isaac has childhood memories of Christmas shopping in Jerusalem, a city which the Israeli government no longer allows him to visit. As an adult, he witnessed the building of the West Bank barrier, which divides Bethlehem from Jerusalem and requires Palestinians to apply for permits to travel through Israeli military checkpoints between the two cities. Due to his pro-Palestine activism, Isaac's permit to travel has been cancelled by the Israeli government.

When the Second Intifada began, Isaac was studying civil engineering at Birzeit University. The Israeli military's response to the Second Intifada angered Isaac, leading him to search for a way to help fellow Palestinians. He decided to study theology, completing an MA at Westminster Theological Seminary and a PhD at the Oxford Centre for Mission Studies.

== Career ==
In 2012, Isaac became the director of Christ at the Checkpoint (CATC), a conference which seeks to encourage and organize opposition to the Israeli occupation of Palestine among Christians from other countries. In addition to attending lectures, conference participants witness some of the features of the Israeli occupation, including the West Bank Barrier and the military checkpoints. The conference is hosted by Bethlehem Bible College, where Isaac became the academic dean in 2015. In 2014, CATC was accused by Yigal Palmor from the Israeli Ministry of Foreign Affairs of using religion for political propaganda; Isaac responded by calling Palmor's statement an attempt at censorship. According to Isaac, CATC has contributed to more awareness of Palestinian viewpoints among Evangelical Christians.

Palestinian pastor Mitri Raheb mentored Isaac and encouraged him to become a pastor. In 2016, Isaac became an ordained minister in the Evangelical Lutheran Church in Jordan and the Holy Land (ELCJHL). Isaac pastors two ELCJHL churches— Christmas Lutheran Church in Bethlehem and The Evangelical Lutheran Church in Beit Sahour. As of 2019, Isaac estimated that Christmas Lutheran Church had 160 local members with thousands more living abroad. Many Palestinian Christians have left the West Bank due to the Israeli occupation and high rates of unemployment.

After the Trump peace plan was published in 2020, Isaac called it "a new Apartheid" that does not consider Palestinian demands. He co-wrote an op-ed in Haaretz predicting that the plan would not achieve peace between Israelis and Palestinians but would instead harm the rights of Palestinians, especially Palestinian Christians. Additionally, he called it "a mortal blow to a dynamic Christian presence in the birthplace of Jesus."

Isaac appeared in 'Til Kingdom Come (2020), an Israeli documentary about American Christian support for Israel. In the film he explains his view to pastor William Bingham that Christian Zionism contributes to the oppression of Palestinians. After their conversation, Bingham calls Isaac an anti-semite and says that Palestinians do not exist.

=== Gaza war ===
In November 2023, Isaac brought a letter from several Bethlehem churches to US President Joseph Biden urging him to end the Gaza war.

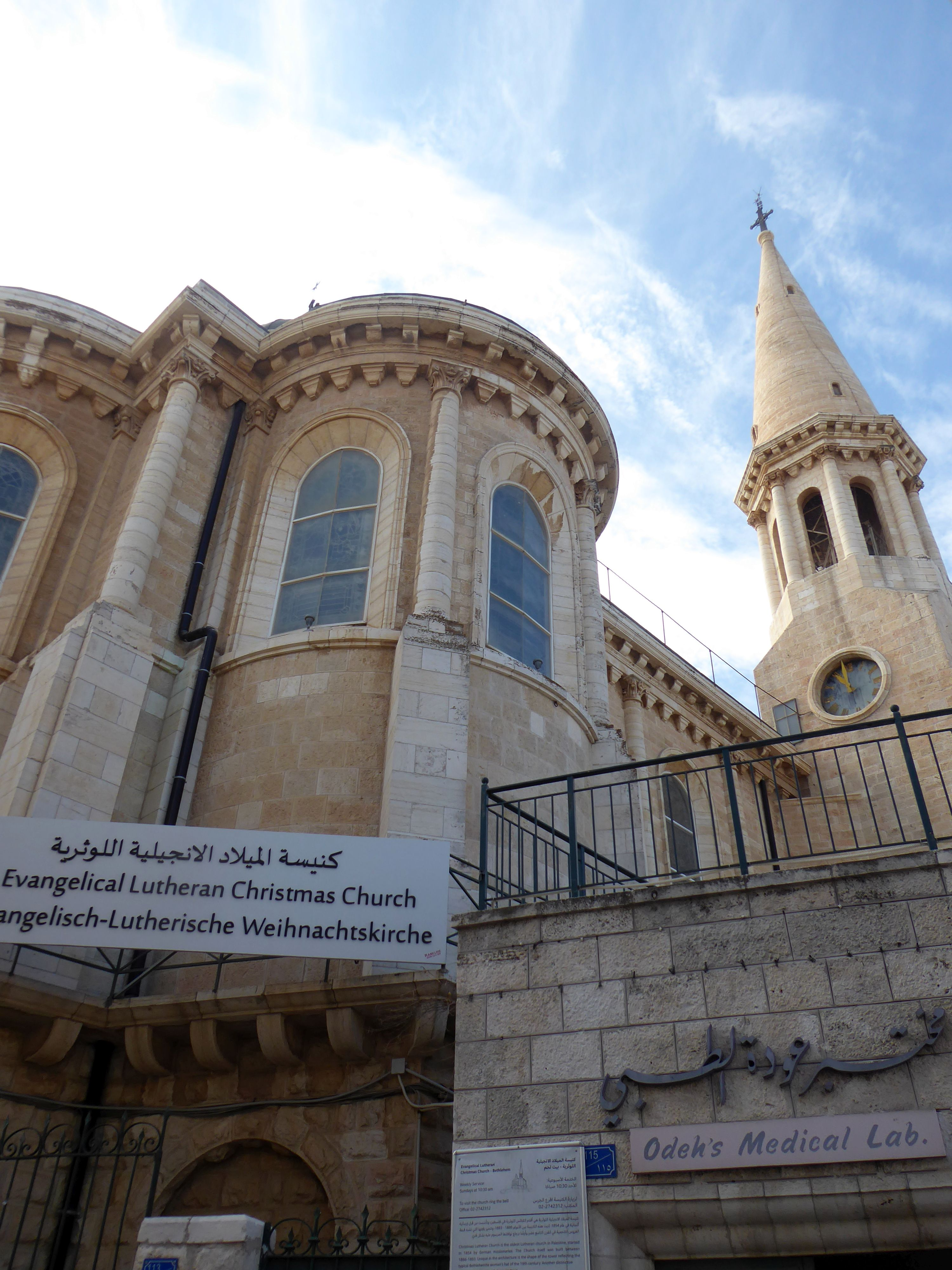
Christmas Lutheran Church – Bethlehem, 2019

During advent season that year, Isaac compared the story of Jesus's birth to the situation in Palestine. The nativity scene in Christmas Lutheran Church in Bethlehem depicted Jesus wrapped in a Palestinian keffiyeh and lying in a pile of rubble. Explaining the nativity scene in a December 7 sermon, Isaac stated: "If Christ were to be born today, he would be born under the rubble and Israeli shelling." On Christmas Eve, Isaac preached a sermon entitled "Christ in the Rubble: A Liturgy of Lament" in which he stated: "We, the Palestinians, will recover, as we always have... But for those who are complicit, I feel sorry for you. Will you ever recover from this?... we will not accept your apology after the genocide." Video of his sermon and photos of the nativity scene went viral on social media. According to Isaac, churches in other countries have sent him photos of their similar nativity scenes.

Isaac has given speeches in various venues across the world, including the Riverside Church in New York City, St. Mark's Episcopal Church in Washington, D.C., and the Global Anti-Apartheid Conference for Palestine in Johannesburg. Following Isaac's speech at a pro-Palestine protest in London that featured Jeremy Corbyn, the Archbishop of Canterbury Justin Welby cancelled their February 2024 meeting. Welby reportedly decided against meeting with Isaac because he feared offending the Jewish community. After Isaac and others publicly criticized Welby's actions, Welby apologized and rescheduled their meeting. Later that year, Welby visited Isaac's church in Bethlehem.

Isaac has criticized Israel's treatment of Palestinian Christians. In an April 2024 interview with conservative commentator Tucker Carlson, Isaac accused Israel of committing genocide in Gaza. Both Carlson and Isaac advocated against US Christian support for Israel due to its mistreatment of Palestinian Christians. The interview, which garnered mixed reactions from American conservatives, has been viewed over 19 million times on Twitter.

In December 2024, Isaac expressed frustration at the lack of progress made towards ending the war but noted that Israel's conduct during the war has led to decreasing support for Israel among Christians in other countries. Isaac's church repeated the previous year's nativity scene portraying Jesus lying in rubble. Other churches including St. Mark's Episcopal Church in Washington, D.C., and All Saints Episcopal Church in Pasadena, California, have created similar nativity scenes inspired by the one at Isaac's church. Isaac delivered a sermon entitled: "Christ Is Still in the Rubble", stating: "'Never again’ has become ‘yet again’ — yet again to supremacy, yet again to racism and yet again to genocide."

== Books ==
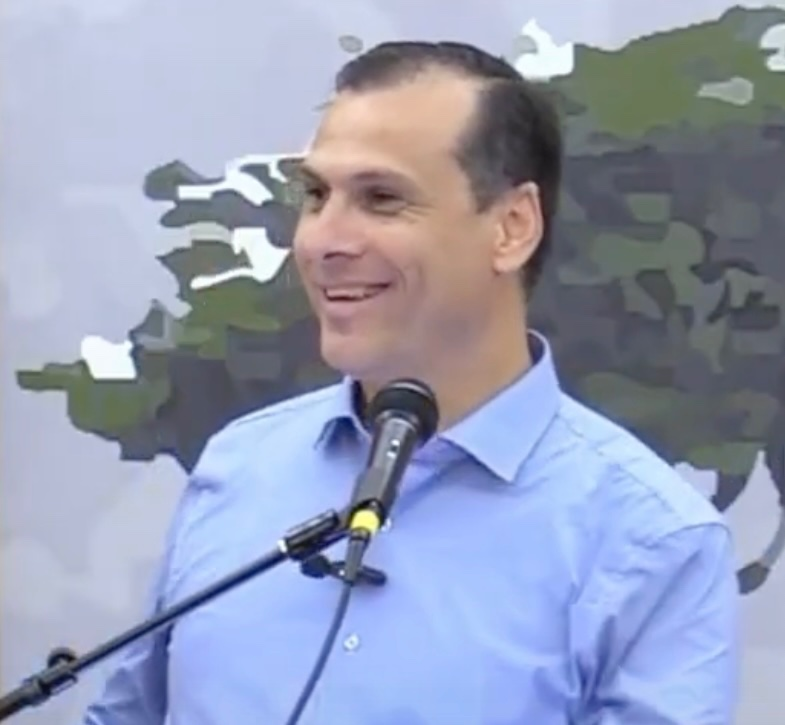
Isaac speaking at the Indiana Center for Middle East Peace in September 2025

=== From Land to Lands, from Eden to the Renewed Earth (2015) ===
Isaac's PhD dissertation was published as the book, From Land to Lands, from Eden to the Renewed Earth. In it, he challenges a Zionist interpretation of the Bible that God promised the land of Israel and Palestine to the Jewish people, as represented by the modern state of Israel. Instead, he argues that the land should be shared.

=== The Other Side of the Wall (2020) ===
In Isaac's book, The Other Side of the Wall, he criticizes Christian Zionists for ignoring Israeli human rights abuses of Palestinians and for believing that Israeli Jews will be converted to Christianity. He argues that Israel prioritizes the rights of Jewish Israelis and advocates that the land should instead be shared equally and peacefully among all people: "Even as I am committed today to the urgency of ending the Israeli occupation, I need to remind myself that the goal in itself is not ending the occupation, but rather reconciliation."

In his review, Samuel T. Logan praises Isaac's knowledge of the Bible and history but expresses a desire for Isaac to explain what it means for Palestinians to love Jewish Israelis as neighbors, especially in the context of the Holocaust. One reviewer writes that Isaac accurately describes Palestinian suffering but disregards Israeli security concerns. Another reviewer writes that the book "dismantles Christian Zionism brick by brick" and "demands a reconsideration of the Israel-Palestine conflict".

=== Christ in the Rubble (2025) ===
Isaac's book, Christ in the Rubble: Faith, the Bible and the Genocide in Gaza (Eerdmans 2025), covers the Christian response to the Gaza war. He has previously stated that the overall Christian response to the war is inadequate because it ignores the history of the conflict, accepts the Israeli narrative, and refrains from explicitly denouncing Israel for genocide and war crimes. The foreword is by Yale theologian Willie James Jennings.

== Personal life ==
Isaac met his wife when he spoke at a Christian conference that she had organized. She is an architect, and they live in Beit Sahour with their two children. He is a Liverpool fan.

== Selected works ==
- From Land to Lands, from Eden to the Renewed Earth: A Christ-Centred Biblical Theology of the Promised Land (2015). Langham Monographs. ISBN 978-1-78368-077-1.
- The Other Side of the Wall: A Palestinian Christian Narrative of Lament and Hope (2020). InterVarsity Press. ISBN 978-0-8308-3220-0.
- Christ in the Rubble: Faith, the Bible, and the Genocide in Gaza (2025). Wm. B. Eerdmans Publishing. ISBN 978-1-4674-7012-4.
