= Salman Hamud Fallah =

- سلمان حمود فلاح
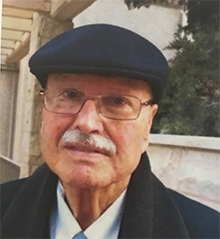
- Salman Fallah's Druze Legacy
- Born: February 16, 1935 (age 91); Smea, Israel
- Occupations: Educator, established Druze Legacy
- Years active: 1959–2016
- Known for: Established Druze Scouts in Israel
- Notable work: Vice President of the Ministry of Education

Salman Hamud Fallah (Arabic: سلمان حمود فلاح; February 16, 1935 – August 12, 2016), was an educator, writer, and a history researcher who established the Druze Scouts Association in Israel. He was a supervisor at the Druze Education department and a vice president of the Ministry of Education and Culture. Falach wrote more than 80 books in Arabic, Hebrew and English on history and education. As a teenager he moved to Haifa city, where he graduated from secondary school at the Hebrew Reali School in 1954. After graduating his studies for the first and second degree (1963), he fulfilled his PHD at Princeton University in the USA (1997). Dr. Salman Hamud Fallah implemented the legacy of Druze studies as an integral part of the higher education curriculum. In 2017 the Centre of the Druze Legacy was established in his name in his native village Kisra-Smea.

== Biography ==
The family tree of the Fallac family is connected to the Shahin family who immigrated to Smeav village in 1711. The family name was changed to Falach which includes four home family names: Fandy, Joseph, Said and Ali.

Fandy Fallah, Salman's grandfather, was on the one hand a broadminded autodidact, and on the other hand a merchant who successfully coped with the Ottoman government. His son Hamud, who was Salman's father, was a religious man who earned his living from agriculture, growing tobacco, and raising goats and sheep. His mother Hizna used to nurse ill people and supported their families. The family included four children: Fares, Salman, Fatma and Temima.

Salman studied at Pikiin village in the elementary school and continued at Tera Santa School in Nazareth. In 1953 he began his studies at The Hebrew Reali School in Haifa.

The mayor of Haifa (1955), Abba Hushi, took an interest and followed career of the first Druze student in the Reali School.

After graduating high school in 1955, Salman was refused as a volunteer in the army and only after his first academic degree was he called as a lecturer to the reserve forces during 19 years. Later, Salman married Kamilia; they have six children.

== Education, society, higher education and public activity ==
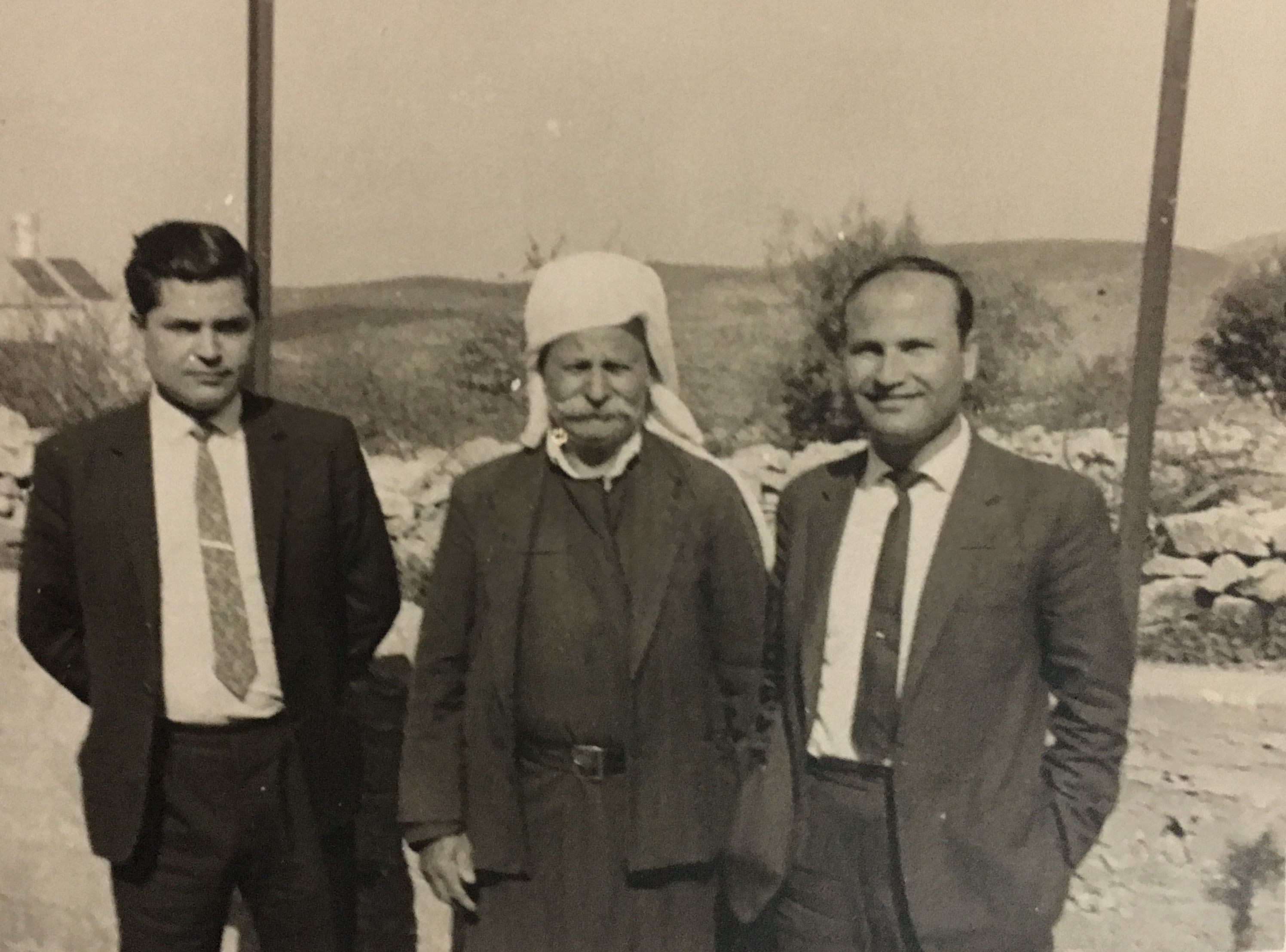
Salman, his father Hamud and his brother Fares

While studying for a BA at The Hebrew University in Jerusalem (1957–1959), Salman worked as a teacher at Beit Zafafa. The first milestone in Fallah 's academic career was in Middle East studies where he earned BA degree in 1959, an MA in Islamic Culture in 1963, and graduation from the Hebrew University of Jerusalem.

Fallac established the Druze Scouts Association in 1954 with his teacher at the Reali school Arie Chroch. The president of Israel Izchak Ben Zvi greeted him by joining the Druze Scouts to the Israeli Scouts. Sheik Amin Tarif supported this initiative and the first scout troops were established in Smea village. Later there were other Druze troops in other Druze villages. The activity of those troops was a cultural breaking point among the new generation by enlarging their horizons beyond the village and the group. Dr Salman Hamud Fallah was chairman of the Druze Scouts Association until 1964 when he was elected for an unlimited period.

In 1959, Fallah worked as a parliamentary correspondent at the Israeli Parliament representing El-Yum newspaper, later, he enlarged his activity as a radio correspondent of Kol Israel (the Voice of Israel) in Arabic.

He was a member of the organization named "Tolerance" working towards tolerance in the Israeli society, a member of the Druze Community Center, and a member of the board at the high school in Yarka.

After the Six-Day War in 1967, he was nominated as an inspector general for Arab Education in Israel and developed the curriculum for schools in the West Bank, East Jerusalem, the Gaza Strip and the Golan Heights.

In 1975 Fallah was nominated as a chairman of the Druze Education and Culture Executive Committee in the Israeli government. He continued this role until 2000 when he retired. Falach's main achievement was to separate the Arab and the Druze curriculum, which created an independent educational system for the Druze population. In 1979 he taught Druze Legacy at the Gordon College of Education in Haifa.

In 1986 he was a lecturer on Islamic Law and the Druze Legacy at the University of Haifa.

In 2006 he received the confirmation of the Council for Higher Education and was nominated as the head of the Druze Legacy at the Gordon College.

Dr. Salman Hamud Fallah was a member of the board of governors of the University of Haifa.

== Published books and articles ==
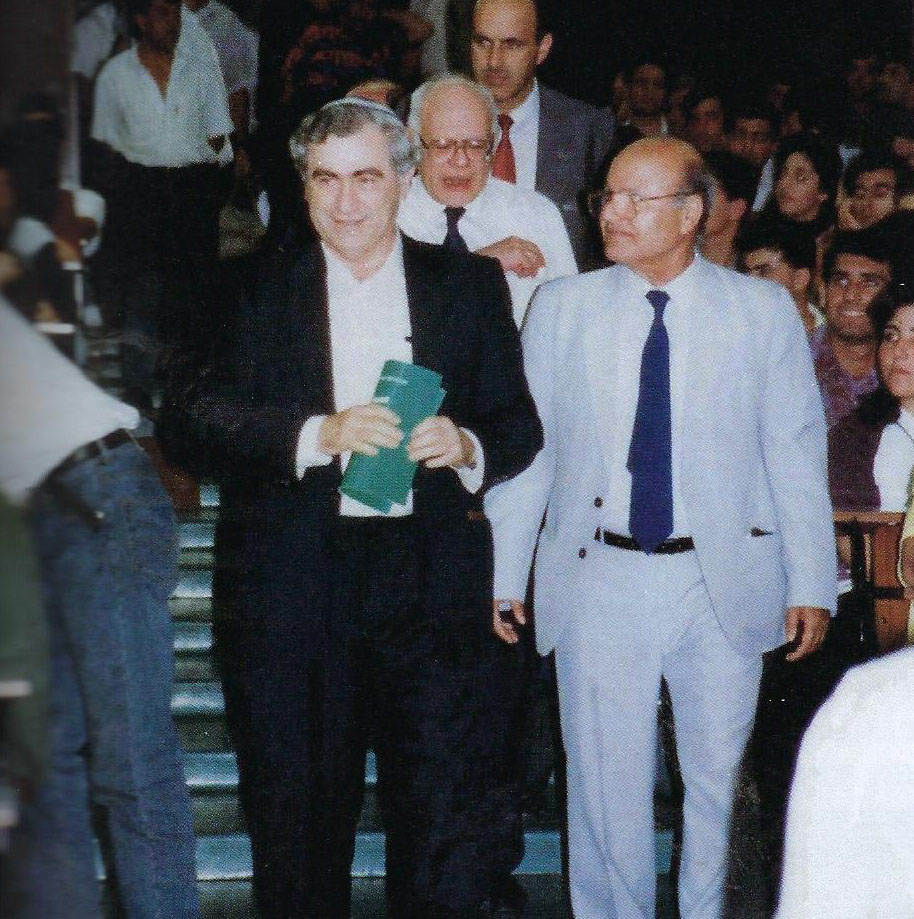
Dr. Falach with Zvulun Hammer-Ministry of Education granting scholarships for Druze students

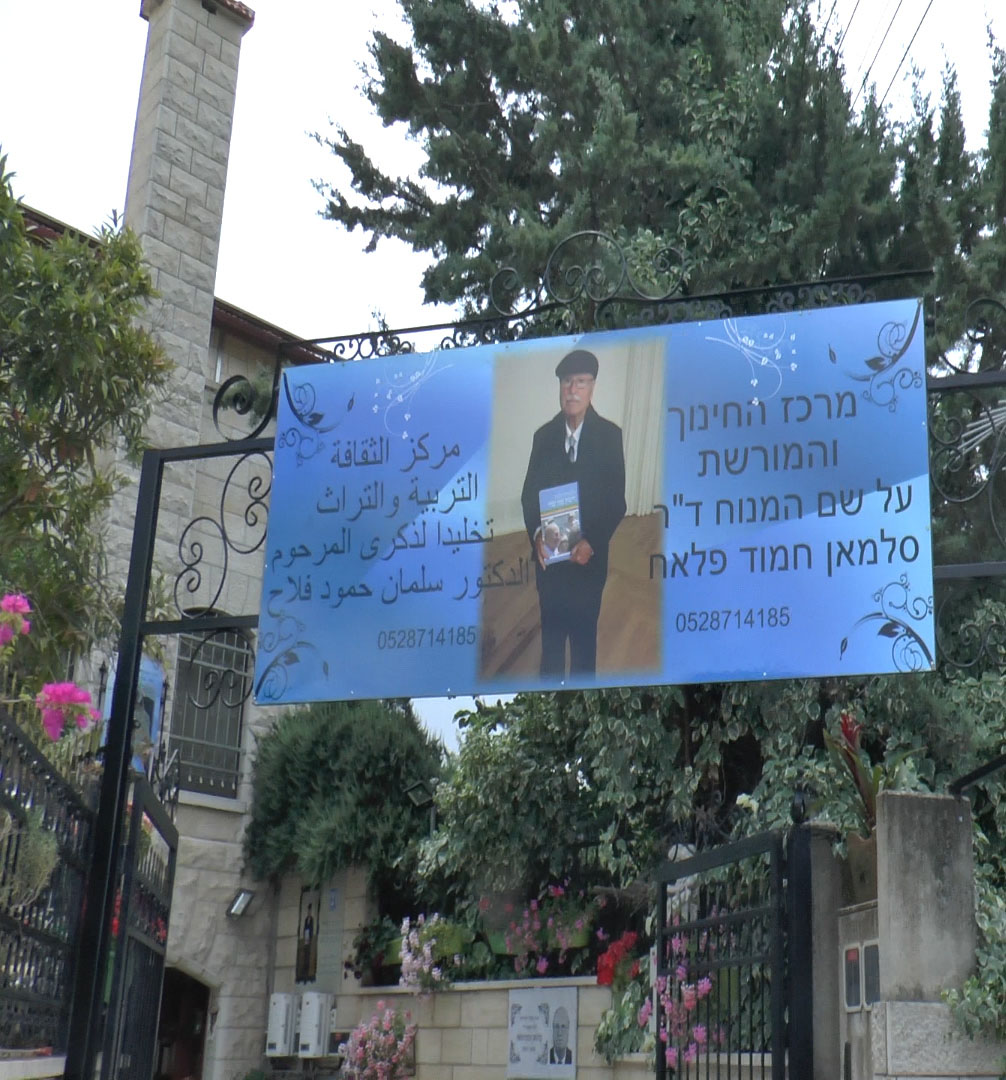
The Center of Druze Legacy in Smea village

Dr. Salman Hamud Fallah published 10 research papers about education in Hebrew, Arabic and English, four books of Arabic Literature, hundreds of newspaper articles in Israel and abroad. Moreover, he published 80 publications, among them 43 books, 20 textbooks for Arabic and Druze schools. He translated three books from Hebrew to Arabic.

== Awards and recognition ==
His widespread activities granted him many rewards:

- 1980, The Reward for Coexistence from the Histadrut federation.
- 1988, The Presiden's award for volunteer work.
- 1988, The Histadrut Teachers' Union award.
- 1999, Reward for the Excellent Employee of Yediot Acharonot newspaper.
- 1999, Reward for Service to the Ministry of Education.
- 2005, Reward for Worthy Person of Haifa City.

== See also ==
- The Druze in Israel

== Published works ==
- Salman H. Fallah (1974). The History of the Druze in Israel, Prime Minister's Office, Jerusalem (Hebrew)
- Dr. Salman Fallah, The Druze in the Middle East, Published by the Ministry of Defence, Tel Aviv 2000 (Hebrew)
- Dr. Salman Fallah, My Legacy, Published by Pardes, 2015 (Hebrew)
