= Evangelical theology =

Christian doctrine

Evangelical theology is the teaching and doctrine that relates to spiritual matters in evangelical Christianity and Christian theology. The main points concern the place of the Bible, the Trinity, worship, salvation, sanctification, charity, evangelism and the end of time.

Various evangelical Christian denominations differ in their doctrine, with churches variously teaching Wesleyan-Arminian theology, Reformed theology, or Baptist theology. Other evangelical bodies, such as the Evangelical Lutheran Church of Brazil, Evangelical Presbyterian Church of Ukraine and the Evangelical Friends Church International, may subscribe to what they see as the orthodox theology espoused by their historic tradition, such as Lutheranism, Presbyterianism or Quakerism, respectively.

There are various nuances when comparing Christian denominations that claim to be evangelical, though many of them would adhere to the doctrine of the believers' church, as with Anabaptists, Baptists and Pentecostals. Evangelical theology is also found within the denominations of mainline Protestantism.

== Features ==
Evangelical theology brings together the main common theological aspects, which can be found in the confessions of faith adopted by the evangelical Christian denominations.

== Main adherent movements ==
Evangelical Christianity brings together different theological movements, the main ones being fundamentalist or moderate conservative, liberal and progressive.

Despite the nuances in the various evangelical movements, there is a similar set of beliefs for movements adhering to the doctrine of the believers' church, the main ones being Anabaptists, Baptists and Pentecostals.

== Authority of the Bible ==
The Bible is considered to be inspired by God Himself and is the sovereign authority in the Christian faith.

When Paul, therefore, declares that "all writing" is the product of the divine breath, "holds his breath of God" (2 Timothy 3:16), he asserts that Scripture is a product of a very specific divine operation. It is therefore important to note that the Greek does not carry the meaning that the terms of the Bible have been "infused" into human writers, but rather that it breathes God. Divine revelation is a kind of perpetual flow of the creative power of God. In other words, it is considered that God "oversaw" the writing of every line of the Bible so that it contains a message in human language sent by God using the human intellect, writing styles and writing talent – this notion is called Biblical inspiration. The believer is dependent on the Holy Spirit to have a good understanding of the texts. The Bible is considered as a life manual that concerns all aspects of life. Often called "the Word of God" or "scripture", it is considered infallible and, in some evangelical circles, without error – this notion is called biblical inerrancy. This is sometimes interpreted in a very literal way within certain movements, in particular the most conservative ones with prominent beliefs often referred to as ultraconservative and fundamentalist movements. With the development of moderate evangelical theology in the 1940s in the United States, the study of the Bible has been combined with disciplines such as hermeneutics, exegesis, epistemology and apologetics.

== God ==
Evangelical churches and denominations have a Trinitarian theology, and as in almost every major Christian stream of thought, the God of creation is eternally present and revealed in three divine Persons, namely, the Father (Almighty God), the Son (or 'Only Son' – literal μονογενης, monogenes, 'unique begotten', Jesus Christ); and the Holy Spirit. The insistence of evangelicals, based on their beliefs found in the Gospels, differs from Catholicism in that evangelicals "only wish to justify this creed on the basis of biblical passages or concepts" and not on Tradition or the Councils (believing that the birth of this dogma is often attached to the Council of Nicaea, which took place at the beginning of the 4th century).

Evangelicals normally adhere (at least informally) to the Nicene Creed (381) defining the relational differentiation of God, both one and triune, as well as the principle of unity and identity, in the case of the two natures, in the person of Christ (christology), as well as the positions of the First Council of Nicaea (and not at the council itself) which condemn Arianism. Before the Council of Nicaea, the idea of the Trinity was not an official teaching of the Church but had been the topic of many early Christian teachings. The Nicene Creed put in place once and for all the idea of Trinitarian theology as is believed to be true by most Christian believers. Nevertheless, most evangelical churches, in order to avoid any unnecessary controversy, often posit that the mystery of the exact relations between the three divine persons is beyond any human reason, and will not encourage speculative theology concerning the subject of the Trinity beyond that which is not immediately deductible from the Bible.

The Virgin Mary is so called because she was a virgin before the birth of Jesus but the evangelicals believe that she had other biological children, the brothers and sisters of Jesus quoted in the Gospels (Mark 6:3). She is recognized as "Maria Christotokos" ('Mother of Christ') and is considered a model of faith, humility and obedience to God. Some evangelicals refute the name of "Theotokos" ('Mother of God') of the Council of Ephesus (431) to avoid any confusion with the Marian devotion found in the Roman Catholic Church, but most evangelical theologians accept this formulation from a theoretical point of view by relying on the principle of communicating idioms and considering that rejecting it would amount to denying the uniqueness of the person of Christ; they generally complete it cautiously with a "according to its human nature".

Evangelicals almost universally reject the idea that Mary is co-redemptor or mediator, as well as the Immaculate Conception, the Dormition and the Assumption, considering them as biblically unjustified, as well as any form of Marian piety as practiced by the Catholic Church.

This Trinitarian conception of God has various consequences in the evangelical Christian faith:

=== God the Father ===
To evangelicals, like other Christians, God, is the creator of heaven and earth. Moreover, God is presented as a loving Father, and the relation of the human to God must necessarily be that of a child vis-à-vis his father.

=== Jesus ===
Jesus is considered perfectly man and perfectly God (Christology). This component of the Trinity, has a resonance and particular consequences for the evangelicals

1. Jesus Christ is considered the "only begotten Son" of God or of the Father (John 3:16), without any biological connotation (belief in his miraculous birth), but in the biblical sense of the term, which according to the evangelical interpretation has a filial symbolic and spiritual status to God, brought closer to Isaac, the son of Abraham (book of Genesis).
2. Jesus Christ is considered as "God made man". It is a firm object of faith that Jesus Christ is only a carnal manifestation of God, and that He has existed from all eternity.
3. Jesus Christ is, considered in his divinity, as a stakeholder in the judgment of the living and the dead which will take place at the end times.

=== Holy Spirit ===
The Holy Spirit (or Spirit of God) God as Spirit is considered to be fully God. It is the eternal manifestation of God in the human dimension. It is the presence of the Spirit that Jesus promised in the Gospel to those who would be converted, attested by the first witnesses of Christ (Acts of the Apostles chapter 2).

All evangelical movements consider that the Holy Spirit is present and working in the personal stories of each believer, as well as in the future of the universal Church. As a stakeholder in the conversion of the individual, it is also considered to be the origin of various gifts, which vary a great deal from the New Testament writings, but it is common in the Charismatic movement emphasize on one gifts delivered by the Spirit. The gifts of the Holy Spirit are 9; creative gifts (writing and the arts), pastoral gifts (community guidance and guidance), apostolic gifts (preaching, teaching), prophetic gifts (prophecy in its various forms), prodigious gifts (wonders and miracles).

Evangelical Christianity, particularly in the Pentecostal, Evangelical charismatic, and Neo-charismatic movements, places an emphasis on the Spirit and its action in human lives and in the church.

== Adoration of God only ==
The evangelicals refute those designated as holy by the Catholic and Orthodox churches because assimilating the worship of veneration, that gives these churches to the saints thus designated, and also particularly the worship to Mary, necromancy and idolatry. They are based on the Ten Commandments.

== Satan ==
For the evangelicals, Satan and his demons are responsible for curses and temptations to sins.

== Salvation ==
=== New birth ===
Evangelicals believe that every sinful person by nature must endure an eternal punishment in hell, but that by faith in Jesus (though not by the merit of their good works committed in this faith), they can attain salvation and go to paradise.

In evangelical Christianity, the believer is justified by faith through grace (Ephesians 2:8). Salvation is the condition for access to paradise. Salvation by faith is a personal decision and commitment. In the Reformed view, the believer is saved by the imputed righteousness of Christ; all the merits of Christ are imputed to the believer by faith.

The new birth, this personal encounter with Jesus Christ that unfolds at the conversion of the believer, is considered a true passage from spiritual death to spiritual life. This concept is based on John 3:3 "Jesus replied, "Very truly I tell you, no one can see the kingdom of God unless they are born again", and John 10:10. Then speak of "born again Christians" (see 2 Corinthians 5:17 and Galatians 6:15). The believer's meet with Jesus and the decision to give them his life marks an important change in an evangelical's life. It means repentance, which is recognition, confession and renunciation of sin. For the majority of evangelical Christians, the new birth occurs before the Believer's baptism, by immersion in the water.

=== Baptism with the Holy Spirit ===
Methodists (inclusive of the holiness movement) define Baptism of the Holy Spirit as synonymous with the second work of grace, entire sanctification, in which a person is made perfect in love and free from original sin.

Pentecostals teach that a baptism of the Holy Spirit as a crisis event accompanied by glossolalia and allows an experimentation of the gifts of the Holy Spirit.

The evangelical charismatic and the Neo-charismatic movement teach that baptism of the Holy Spirit is a crisis experience. However, speaking in tongues (glossolalia) is not the only proof of this spiritual event. The believer may have received the other eight gifts of the Holy Spirit set forth in 1 Corinthians 12–14.

For the majority of Baptists, baptism of the Holy Spirit is synonymous with the New Birth.

=== Sanctification ===
The sanctification of the believer is the process by which a person dedicates himself to God and chooses to refuse the sin, by the grace of God after the new birth. There are two evangelical positions on sanctification, progressive sanctification and whole sanctification.

==== Progressive sanctification ====
Progressive sanctification is the work of sanctification of the believer through grace and the decisions of the believer after the new birth. This is the position of some evangelical denominations, such as Baptist churches and some Pentecostal denominations of the Finished Work Pentecostal variety such as the Assemblies of God and the Foursquare Church.

==== Entire sanctification ====
Entire sanctification, also known as Christian perfection, is a second work of grace subsequent to the new birth in which an individual is made perfect in love and free from original sin. This is the position of Methodist denominations (inclusive of the holiness movement), as well as Holiness Pentecostal denominations, such as the International Pentecostal Holiness Church, Church of God (Cleveland) and Church of God in Christ. These denominations affirm a growth in grace before and after entire sanctification that is accomplished "through a consistent Christian life of faith and good works."

=== Good works ===
According to Reformed theology, good works are the consequence of the salvation and not its justification. They are the sign of a sincere and grateful faith. They include actions for the Great Commission, that is, evangelism, service in the Church and to charity. They will be rewarded with the grace of God at the last judgment.

In contrast, the Methodist churches (inclusive of the holiness movement), teach:

...after a man is saved and has genuine faith, his works are important if he is to keep justified.
146) James 2:20-22, "But wilt thou known, O vain main, that faith without (apart from) works is dead? Was not Abraham our father justified by works, when he had offered Isaac his son upon the altar? Seest thou faith wrought with works, and by works was faith made perfect? —A Catechism on the Christian Religion: The Doctrines of Christianity with Special Emphasis on Wesleyan Concepts

== Church ==
The local evangelical church is the organization that represents the universal Church and is seen by evangelicals as the body of Jesus Christ. It is responsible for teaching and ordinances, mainly the believer's baptism and the Lord's Supper, and occasionally others, such as foot-washing. Each church has a particular confession of faith and a common confession of faith if it is a member of a denomination. Some denominations are members of a national alliance of churches of the World Evangelical Alliance.

=== Ministries ===
Common ministries within evangelical congregations are pastor, elder, deacon, evangelist and worship leader. The ministry of bishop with a function of supervision over churches on a regional or national scale is present in many the evangelical Christian denominations, even if the titles president of the council or general overseer are mainly used for this function. The term bishop is explicitly used in certain denominations. Some evangelical denominations operate according to episcopal polity or presbyterian polity. However, the most common form of church government within evangelicalism is congregational polity. This is especially common among non-denominational evangelical churches.

=== Worship service ===
The worship service in evangelical churches is seen as an act of worship of God. There is no liturgy, as the conception of worship service is more informal. It usually contains two main parts, the praise (Christian music) and the sermon, with periodically the Lord's Supper. The Latin cross is one of the only spiritual symbols that can usually be seen on the building of an evangelical church and that identifies the place's belonging. Because of their understanding of the second of the Ten Commandments, evangelicals do not have religious material representations such as statues, icons, or paintings in their places of worship.

The main Christian feasts celebrated by evangelicals are Christmas, Pentecost (by a majority of evangelical denominations) and Easter for all believers.

=== Mission ===
For evangelicals, the mission is based on the Great Commission given by Jesus, to share the Good News of Kingdom of God, to form disciples and to baptize the believers. In churches, there are programs of evangelism, local and international. Most evangelicals believe that the conversion of hearts is the work of God alone, by his Holy Spirit (John 16:8), but also know that sharing faith with unbelievers is an act of gratitude for what God did for them (Matthew 10:32) It takes shape in the distribution of tracts and Bibles, the formation of disciples, support to churches and Christian humanitarian aid. Various evangelical mission organizations have specialized in evangelization throughout history.

=== Charity ===
Charity, concern for helping the needy, is one of three primary Christian virtues and a concept clearly established from the Old Testament. It is expressed first in terms of financial generosity but also in terms of time spent. It is also considered very important by most evangelical churches. Some churches give large sums of money each year on humanitarian aid (food support, medical aid, education, etc.).

This value is at the origin of the modern Christian humanitarian aid. At the beginning of the 20th century, the American Baptist pastor Walter Rauschenbusch, leader of the Social Gospel movement, developed the importance of social justice and humanitarian actions in evangelical churches. The majority of evangelical Christian humanitarian organizations were founded in the second half of the 20th century. Among the most important are International Justice Mission, Prison Fellowship International, Samaritan's Purse, Mercy Ships, World Vision International. The majority of Christian NGOs help everyone, regardless of religion.

== End of time ==
=== Last Judgment ===
It is a belief in Christianity in general and in other monotheistic religions that at the end of time there will be a last judgment by God. Jesus Christ will come back personally, corporeally, and visibly. While other religions and branches of Christianity conceive that they will be judged on the basis of their actions, an important point of evangelical Christianity is to believe that humans will be judged on their faith, namely on their acceptance or not of Jesus Christ as Savior and Lord when they heard the Christian gospel in their lifetime. Good works are the consequence of the salvation and will be rewarded by the grace of God at the last judgment.

=== Covenant theology versus Dispensationalism ===
Some evangelicals uphold covenant theology, while others are dispensationalists. They divide history into seven major periods (dispensations). These seven periods are:

1. Innocence: Adam and Eve before their fall
2. Consciousness: Humanity has sinned and has to answer to God
3. The human government: From the flood, God gives a political organization to humanity
4. The reign of the patriarchs (or the promise): Abraham, God promises the blessing to him who believes in him
5. The Law: God makes an alliance with Israel for His good and the blessing of the nations
6. The Church: God completely forgives those who believe in Jesus
7. The millennium: Jesus will come back and reign for 1000 years of peace on earth

Thus, most of them believe in the second coming of Christ, or, for some, to its imminence that would then proceed to Rapture of the Church. According to them, at first, the Church will be removed (1 Thessalonians 4:16–18) and thus preserved judgments that will affect the world (Book of Revelation 3:10 ) for seven years; then the Church will be united to the Messiah (Revelation 19:7–8) before he comes to establish the millennium (Revelation 20:1–6): peace on Earth, after which will come the Last Judgment (Revelation 20:11–15), the end times and the entry into a new world (Revelations 21:1).

- The Zionist evangelicals: They are dispensationalists and Zionists because they believe they are at the end of the sixth dispensation. For them, the creation of the modern state of Israel (1948) corresponds to the biblical and prophetic restoration of Israel, to the restoration of the chosen people, prologue the seventh dispensation and the return of Christ. To help the full establishment of Israel and to support it is therefore to follow the plan and the will of God.
- Non-Zionist evangelicals: Though thinking to be in the sixth dispensation, they doubt or even perceive at all modern Israel as being the kingdom of Israel to be restored by the divine will. For them, the modern state is a result of men and not of God; in this sense, they join the position of Haredi or ultra-Orthodox Jews. To support this non-divine, non-prophetic Israel could then go against the divine will; their attitude thus oscillates between neutrality and hostility towards the state of Israel.
- Non-dispensationalist evangelicals: For them, dispensationalism is a doctrine developed especially by Cyrus Scofield: thus, it is human, unmentioned in the Bible and without any divine inspiration or foundation. However, this does not prevent them from estimating the second coming of Christ more or less close in time. Their attitude toward the state of Israel is therefore variable but generally neutral.

== Controversies ==
A particularly controversial doctrine among evangelical churches is that of prosperity theology, which spread in the 1970s and 1980s in the United States, mainly through televangelism. This doctrine is centered on the teaching of Christian faith as a means to enrich oneself financially and materially, through a "positive confession" and a contribution to Christian ministries. Promises of divine healing and prosperity are guaranteed in exchange for certain amounts of donations. Fidelity in the tithe would allow one to avoid the curses of God, the attacks of the devil and poverty. Offerings and tithing occupies a lot of time in worship services. Often associated with the mandatory tithe, this doctrine is sometimes compared to a religious business. It is criticized by pastors and church unions, such as the National Council of Evangelicals of France.

== See also ==
- World Evangelical Alliance
- Bible
- Born again
- Jesus Christ
- Believers' Church

== Bibliography ==
- Roger E. Olson, The Westminster Handbook to Evangelical Theology, Westminster John Knox Press, USA, 2004
- Gerald R. McDermott, The Oxford Handbook of Evangelical Theology, Oxford University Press, UK, 2013
- Timothy Larsen, Daniel J. Treier, The Cambridge Companion to Evangelical Theology, Cambridge University Press, UK, 2007
- Paul Jewett, God, Creation and Revelation: A Neo-Evangelical Theology, Wipf and Stock Publishers, USA, 2000
- Gary J. Dorrien, The Remaking of Evangelical Theology, Westminster John Knox Press, USA, 1998
- Walter A. Elwell, Evangelical Dictionary of Theology, Baker Academic, USA, 2001
- Roger E. Olson, Pocket History of Evangelical Theology, InterVarsity Press, USA, 2007
- Robert Paul Lightner, Handbook of Evangelical Theology, Kregel Academic, USA, 1995
