= Geoff Tunnicliffe =

British-Canadian strategist & author

Geoff Tunnicliffe is a British-born Canadian strategist and author. He was the Secretary-General for the World Evangelical Alliance from 2005–2014.

== Biography ==
He studied communications in British Columbia Institute of Technology and Wheaton College (Illinois) Graduate School. He got a Bachelor of Arts in Christian Leadership at Trinity International University. In 2007, he received an Honorary degree in Doctor of Ministry at Olivet University.

== Career ==
Tunnicliffe has served as the executive director of International Teams, an international agency and an organizational consultant. From 1999-2002 he led a multi-national team to develop the Refugee Highway Partnership, a World Evangelical Alliance network that builds collaboration among the 350 organizations serving refugees around the world.

He also served as Director, Global Initiatives for the Evangelical Fellowship of Canada, served on the board of Micah Challenge International. The Micah Challenge is a global campaign of the World Evangelical Alliance and the Micah Network to mobilize Christians against poverty. The campaign aimed to deepen Christian engagement with impoverished and marginalized communities, and to influence leaders of rich and poor nations to fulfill their promise to achieve the Millennium Development Goals.

In 2005, he became the Secretary-General for the World Evangelical Alliance until 2014.

For 10 year, Tunnicliffe served as the Secretary General of the World Evangelical Alliance (WEA). The WEA serves and represents more than 600 million evangelical Christians, 7 regional and 143 national Evangelical Alliances, and over 150 member organizations. As Secretary General, he built trusted and warm relationships with the leaders of other international bodies including the Vatican, the World Council of Churches, the United Nations, Religions for Peace, and the World Bank as well as many global faith and humanitarian organizations.

In addition to numerous magazine articles, Tunnicliffe has authored several books, including "101 Ways to Change Your World.""

After serving in senior organizational roles, Geoff Tunnicliffe focuses on expanding of faith and value-based media and business enterprises. He has stated that such initiatives can contribute to fostering social stability, reduce international conflict, and improve social conditions.

Tunnicliffe is an author and has been a frequent speaker at universities and international conferences. He is sought out by the media to provide analysis and commentary on a wide range of issues. Tunnicliffe through his company, Wilberforce Global Strategies, has served or continues to serve as an advisor / strategist / board chair to a number of media and business companies or projects including:

- Christian Media Corporation with its multiple websites including Christian Post, the number one Christian website worldwide and Christian Today.
- YouVersion Bible App (300 million installs on smartphones and tablets)
- Crossroads Communication and Tricord Media
- The Bible and A.D. The Bible Continues TV series (Produced by Mark Burnett and Roma Downey)
- Pure Flix Entertainment
- Ben Hur (MGM Production by Mark Burnett and Roma Downey)
- Amazing Grace (Movie)
- The Chronicles of Narnia film franchise
- Northern Lights (Movie in development)
- Little Boy (Movie)
- Caged No More (Movie)
- God’s Not Dead (Movie)
- Global Kingdom Partnership Network (An invitation-only global network of Mega-church pastors and marketplace leaders)
- Unashamedly Ethical an international campaign promoting ethics and values
- Skin Tech (A new technology for the natural and non-medical treatment in removing tattoos.)
- TVEON Inc (A new company with a breakthrough technology in video file compression.)
- Hit Song TV show (in development)
- Questions TV show (in development)
- Dynamo Inc. (An innovative technology company developing unique mobile apps)
- Randy Lennon Media and Visland Media
- The Billion Dollar Boss movie (in development)
- Several new feature and documentary films under development
- Kingstone Bible (The world’s most complete graphic Bible)
- Media Farm (facilitates investment into development, production and distribution of high- quality, culturally relevant and commercially appealing films, television, and other media entertainment.)

While primarily based in Vancouver, Canada, he also has offices in New York City and Los Angeles.

== Personal life ==
Geoff was born in 1954 in Lancashire, U.K. and lives in Vancouver, British Columbia, Canada. Prior to the family immigrating to Canada, Geoff as a youngster lived in Barrowford, Lancashire, U.K., and Alvaston, Derbyshire, U.K.
