= Druze Scouts Association =

Scouting organization of Druze-Israelis

Druze Scouts Association in Israel
- Headquarters: Haifa
- Country: Israel
- Founded: 1954
- Founder: Salman Hamud Fallah
- Membership: 5,000
- Chairman: Labib Abu-Hamud

Druze Scouts Association in Israel (Hebrew: ארגון הצופים הדרוזים בישראל, Irgun HaTzofim HaDruzim BeYisrael, Arabic: منظمة الكشاف الدرزي الإسرائيلي, Monazamat al-Kashaf al-Druzi al-Isra'ili) is an Israeli Druze coed Scouting and Guiding association with about 5,000 members. It is the largest Druze youth organization.

The Druze Scouts in Israel were led by Salman Hamud Fallah (1935-2016), who started the organization in 1954. The organization is a member organization of the Israel Boy and Girl Scouts Federation.

Falach returned from study in the United States in 1975 and has headed the association since.

Currently there are Druze Scout tribes in all the Druze villages in Israel, the Golan Heights, Galilee and Carmel. Druze Scouting operates within the school system, and each Druze school has its own troop, from elementary-level through high school.

== See also ==
- Arab and Druze Scouts Movement
- Druze in Israel
