= Catholic Scout Association in Israel =

Catholic Scouts youth Association in Israel

- Affiliation: World Organization of the Scout Movement

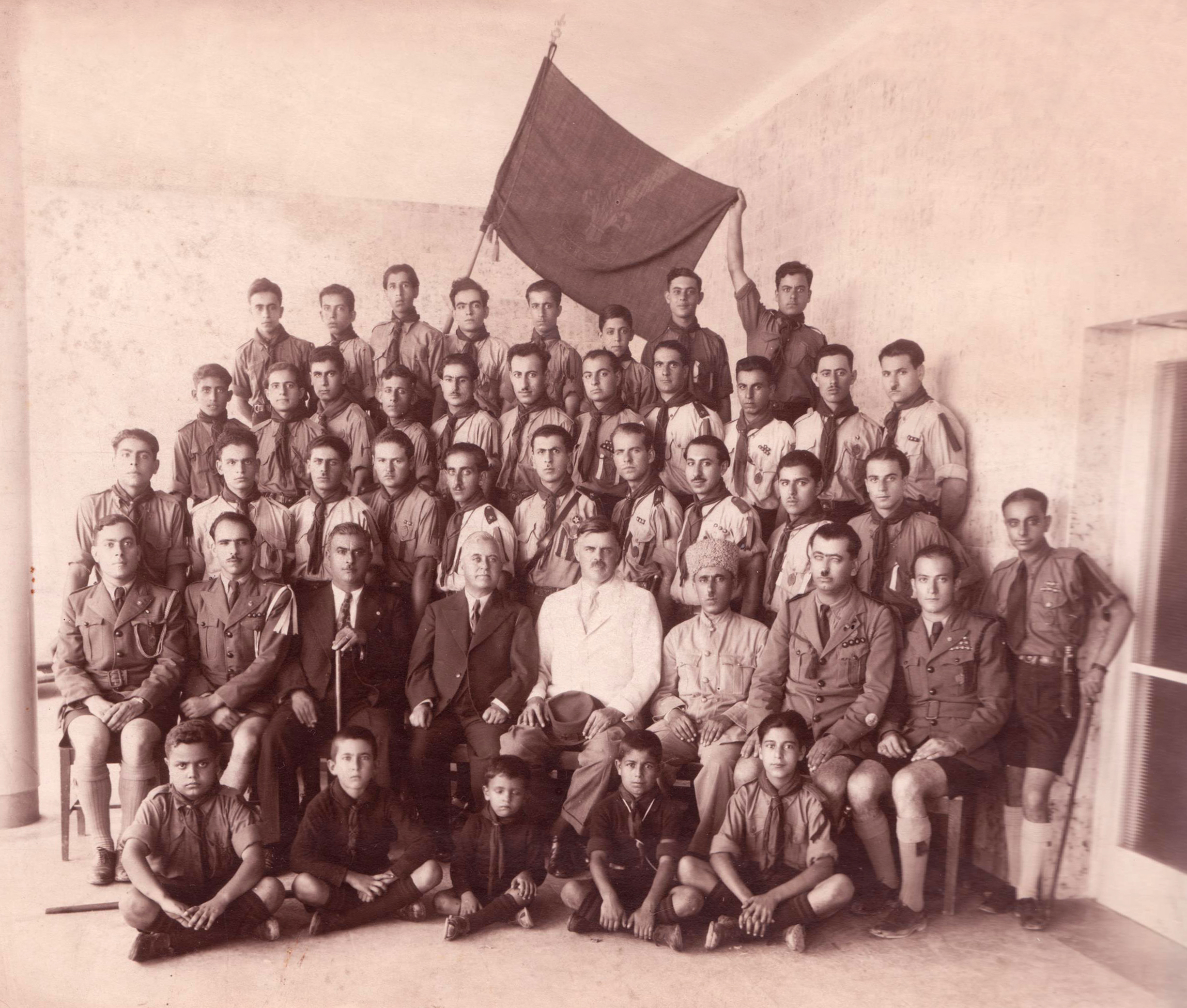
Haifa Maronite Boy Scouts with Dr. John Macqueen Chief Medical Officer for Haifa, 1939

The Israel Catholic Scouts Association (Arabic: منظمة الكشاف الكاثوليكي في إسرائيل, Monazamat Al-kashaf Al-katuliki fi Israyil) was founded in 1951 from five Scout groups established since 1926. Today, the organization consists of 18 Scout groups which belong to the Greek Catholic, Latin, and Maronite creeds. Three archbishops are Co-Presidents of the organization.

As of 2011, the Catholic Scouts maintain a membership of approximately 2,500, ages 7 to 18 and 800 volunteer leaders. They are aligned to the Arab and Druze Scouts Movement.

== See also ==
- Orthodox Christian Scout Association
