= Israel Arab Scouts Association =

Scouting Association

Israel Muslim Scouts Association
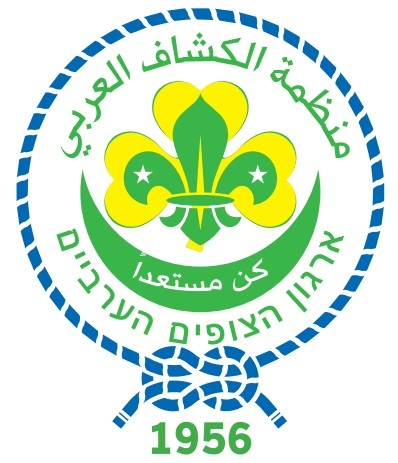
- Headquarters: Shefaram
- Country: Israel
- Founded: 1956
- Membership: 2,000
- Chairman: Ali Ayub

Israel Muslim Scouts Association, or the new name Israel Arab Scouts Association (Hebrew: ארגון הצופים הערביים, romanized: Irgun HaTzofim HaArabim) was established in 1956. Today there are 14 tribes, most of them in the Galilee, but others are located in Jerusalem, in the center of Israel and in the Triangle. It is part of the Israel Boy and Girl Scouts Federation and the World Scouts Movement. Like other Scouting organizations it is based on community service, volunteering, giving and helping others.

The organization nurtures youth and empowers them to produce leaders with a positive influence within the young, the community and the state. It sees Israel's social fabric educate challenge of coexistence life, love of others and respect for human life as such. The organization's mission to the Arab population in particular and Israeli society in general is to educate and raise citizens loyal to the state and its laws and adopt democratic values as a way of life.

== Activities in national level ==
- Seminars: Scout Tribe chiefs, coordinators, safety and security, leaders, preparing young counselors and more.
- Participation in national Israel Boy and Girl Scouts Federation activity, such as workshops, seminars, Wood Badge, Scouting Badge and Sea Scouting Badge.
- Hosting Scout groups from abroad and building joint programs with Jewish sector groups that represent the state on the whole range of Israeli culture.

== Age distribution layers ==
- Ages 5–8: Nitzanim
- Ages 9–12: Ofarim
- Ages 13–15: Scouts (Shacbatz)
- Ages 16 and up: Rovers (Shachbag)
