= Palestinian Scout Association =

Organization for Scouting in Palestine

- جمعية الكشافة والمرشدات الفلسطينية
- Country: State of Palestine
- Founded: January 4, 1912
- Membership: 87,836
- Affiliation: World Organization of the Scout Movement, World Association of Girl Guides and Girl Scouts
- Website http://scout.ps

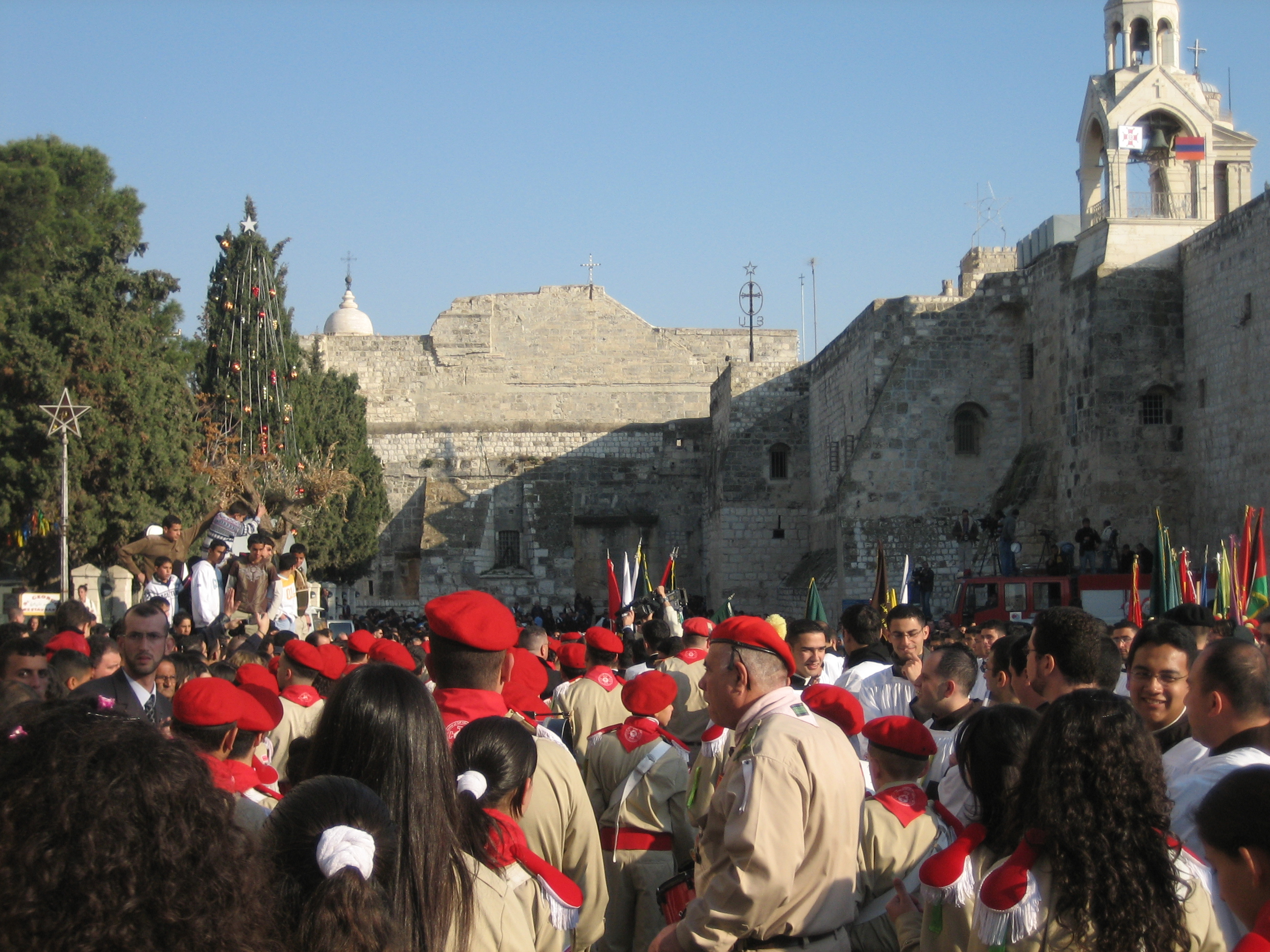
Christian Palestinian Scouts on Christmas Eve in front of the Church of the Nativity in Bethlehem.

The Palestinian Scout Association (Arabic: جمعية الكشافة والمرشدات الفلسطينية, Jim'yat-e Al-kashafat Walmirshidat Al-falastinit) is the organization responsible for the Scout movement in Palestine.

The Palestinian Scout Association serves youth throughout the State of Palestine. The headquarters are in Ramallah in the West Bank, and the International Commissioner is Dr. Fayeq H. Tahboub.

On 27 February 2016, the Palestinian Scout Association gained back the initial full voting rights in World Organization of the Scout Movement. In 2017, it became a full member of the World Association of Girl Guides and Girl Scouts.

== History ==
The Scout movement in Palestine started in 1912 at St. George's School in Jerusalem, and participated in the World Scout Jamborees in 1929 and 1933.

The Association was recognized by the World Scout Bureau in 1945. The modern Palestinian Scout Association was formed in exile due to the 1948 war. However, recognition was withdrawn in 1949.

According to the World Organisation of the Scouting Movement (WOSM), a recognition of Scout movements is possible only when Scouting is active and operating within the borders of its own national state that has a seat in the United Nations. Palestine was admitted in 1993 as a special member. Official recognition was restored by the World Scout Conference in 1996. The president of the Israel Scouting Federation made a statement asking the World Scout Conference to support the proposal. His speech was received with a standing ovation. The Palestinian Scout Association was accepted as an Associate WOSM Member. On 27 February 2016, the World Scout Committee recognized the Palestinian Scout Association as the National Scout Organization of the State of Palestine and conferred the Association with Full WOSM Membership with voting rights. The membership certificate was to be presented to the organisation during the 41st World Scout Conference, to be conducted in Baku, Azerbaijan in 2017.

As of February 2026, 125 members of the association have been killed by Israeli occupation forces in Gaza during the Gaza war.

== Program and ideals ==
As of 2009, 18,738 members were registered in the Palestinian Scout Association. 35% belong to school groups, and the rest to open or religious groups, predominantly Muslim and Christian.

As of December 2021, 87,836 youths were registered in the Palestinian Scout Association served by 4,757 volunteers.

The Scout Motto is Kun Musta'idan or كن مستعدًا, translating as Be Prepared in Arabic. The noun for a single Scout is kaššaf or كشاف in Arabic.

== Girl Guides of Palestine ==
Girl Guides of Palestine
- Country: Palestine

The Girl Guides of Palestine (Arabic: إتحاد الفتيات المرشدات الفلسطيني, romanized: 'Iithad Al-Fatayat Al-Murshidat Al-Filastinii) is the national Guiding organization of the Palestinian National Authority. As of 2005, the association was granted the official status of "Working towards WAGGGS membership" by the World Association of Girl Guides and Girl Scouts acknowledging the development of the association.

Girl Guides were established in the British Mandate of Palestine in 1919, in association with the Girl Guides Association in England. In 1927, a visitor reported that the movement had 260 Guides and 10 Rangers, most of them Arabs. The Palestinian Director of Education, Humphrey Bowman, described the association as "side by side with the Boy Scouts but under an independent body and organized under strictly harim conditions." Like the Boy Scouts, it was confined to the Arab community. The Guiders were recruited from among teachers in the government and private schools. Some Girl Guide troops participated in demonstrations during the 1930s, paralleling the activities of the Palestinian Boy Scouts, a politically active group in the 1930s.

== Emblems ==
The emblem of the Palestinian Scout Association incorporates elements of the coat of arms of Palestine.

== 2023 anti-war protests ==
Their Christmas parade in Bethlehem in 2023 was a protest march against the war in Gaza. They were part of broader protests in Bethlehem, that included artistic nativity scenes such as "Christ in the Rubble" at the Evangelical Lutheran Christmas Church, assembled at by Rev. Dr. Munther Isaac to illustrate his Christmas sermon. Earlier that week Bethlehem itself had been subjected to raids.
