= Efraim Tendero =

Philippine Evangelical leader

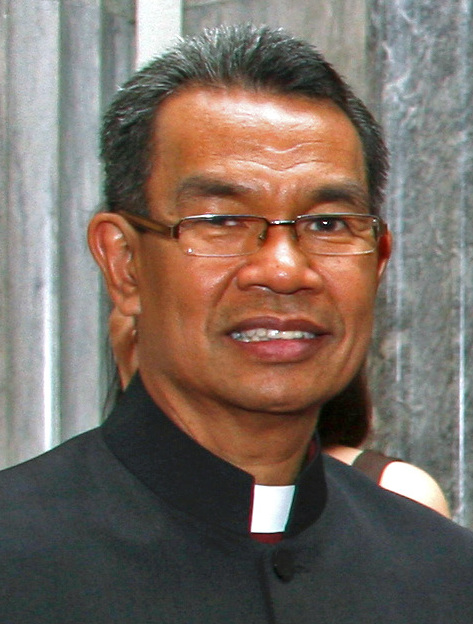

Personal life
- Born: Philippines
- Spouse: Sierry Soriano
- Children: 4

Religious life
- Religion: Evangelical

Senior posting
- Post: Ambassador of the World Evangelical Alliance

Efraim Tendero, born in the Philippines, is an Evangelical leader, an ambassador of the World Evangelical Alliance, former Secretary-General of World Evangelical Alliance. He was previously National Director of the Philippine Council of Evangelical Churches for 22 years, executive director of the Philippine Relief and Development Services (PHILRADS), and executive editor of the periodical Evangelicals Today.

== Biography ==
Tendero was born in Philippines. He studied evangelical theology at FEBIAS College of Bible Valenzuela, Philippines where he obtained a Bachelor of Arts in 1978. He continued his studies in United States, at the Trinity Evangelical Divinity School in Deerfield, Illinois. He will get a Master's degree in theology with a focus on Pastoral Counseling.

== Ministry ==
In 1993, Tendero appointed National Director of the Philippine Council of Evangelical Churches (PCEC), an alliance which includes 30,000 Evangelical churches. He held this position until February 23, 2015, for 22 years. He was sworn in February 21, 2015, for a term who officially began March 1, 2015. He was also executive director of the Philippine Relief and Development Services (PHILRADS) and executive editor of the periodical Evangelicals Today. In 2005, he was appointed to the Philippine Consultative Commission which was tasked to review and propose amendments to the 1987 Constitution. He was a mediator for five years in Iraq in the peace process with the rebels of Moro Islamic Liberation Front.

In 2014, he appeared in the action drama film Alibughang Anak (lit. 'Prodigal Child'), directed by fellow pastor Rudy Fajardo. On January 24, 2015, he was elected Secretary-General of World Evangelical Alliance for a period of five years. He ended his term in 2021 and became an ambassador of the World Evangelical Alliance, as a spokesperson.

== Awards ==
He received three honorary degrees: from the Asian Theological Seminary, the FEBIAS College of Bible, and the International School of Theology-Asia.

== Personal life ==
Tendero is married to Sierry Soriano. They have four children; Elizabeth Esther, Efraim Elijah, Ezra Emmanuel and Elah Eunice.
