= St. Mark's Episcopal Church (Washington, D.C.) =

Historic church in Washington, D.C., United States

- St. Mark's Church
- U.S. National Register of Historic Places
- U.S. Historic district – Contributing property
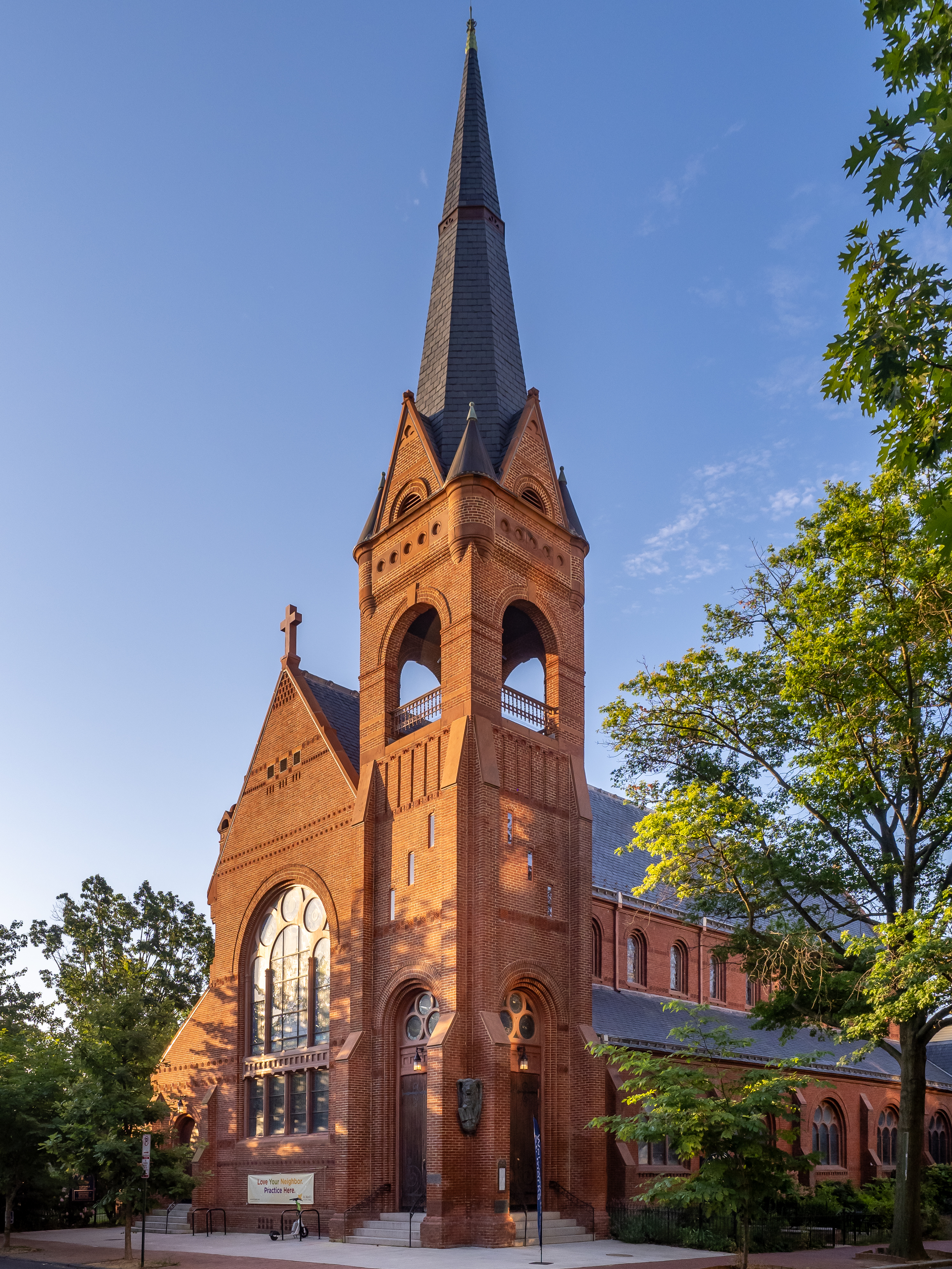
- St. Mark's Church in 2024

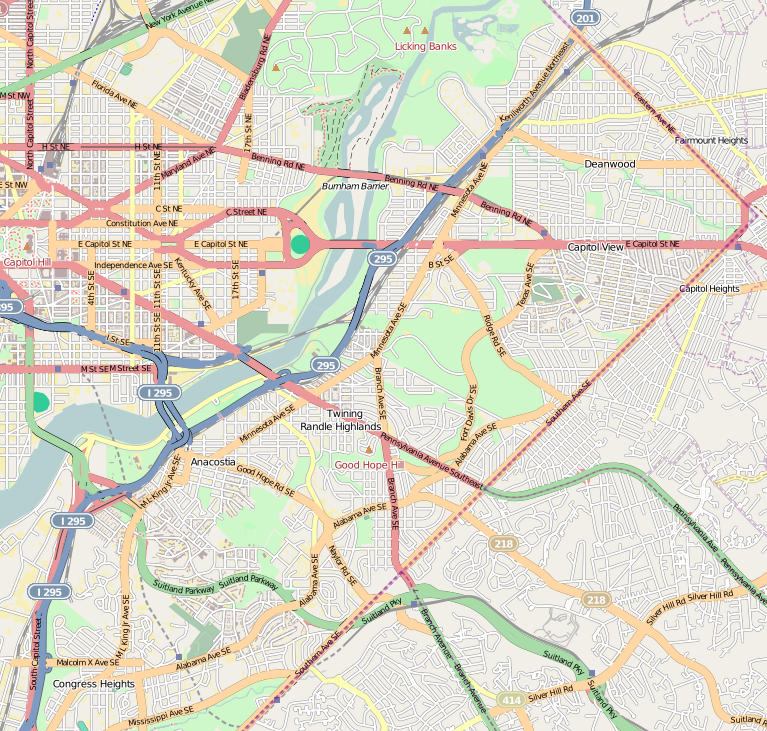
- Location within Washington, D.C.
- Location: 3rd and A Streets, SE; Washington, D.C. United States
- Coordinates: 38°53′18″N 77°0′6″W
- Built: 1894
- Architect: T. Buckler Ghequier; Delos Smith
- Architectural style: Gothic Revival; Romanesque Revival
- NRHP reference No.: 73002117
- Added to NRHP: May 8, 1973

St. Mark's Episcopal Church, also known as St. Mark's, Capitol Hill, is a historic Episcopal church located at 3rd and A Streets, Southeast in the Capitol Hill neighborhood of Washington, D.C. Built 1888–1894, the church is an example of Gothic Revival and Romanesque Revival architectures. The red brick structure has a modified basilica floorplan with no apse. The interior features cast iron columns and hammerbeam trusses.

The church reported 608 members in 2015 and 712 members in 2023; no membership statistics were reported in 2024 parochial reports. Plate and pledge income reported for the congregation in 2024 was $1,022,482. Average Sunday attendance (ASA) in 2024 was 247 persons.

== History ==
St. Mark's began as a mission of Christ Church in 1867. In 1868, the mission organized its own congregation and built its first permanent structure on Beale Terrace between 2nd and 3rd Streets, a site now occupied by the John Adams Building of the Library of Congress. In 1869, it became St. Mark's Memorial Parish and in 1870, St. Mark's Parish.

In 1880, the congregation acquired the land where the present church stands and began raising funds for construction. The cornerstone was laid September 17, 1888 and the first services were held February 23, 1889. Initially, the new building was connected to the existing chapel which then was used as a parish hall. The old structure was demolished in 1894 allowing the nave to be extended and the chancel, high altar and spire to be added.

When the Diocese of Washington was created from the Diocese of Maryland in 1895, St. Mark's was chosen as the first cathedral in 1896 and served in this capacity until 1902. The Munich stained glass windows were installed between 1888 and 1947 and include a Tiffany window in the baptistry created in 1888.

In the 1940s and 1950s, church membership declined as residents moved from the area to the expanding suburbs. A group of dedicated members set out to revitalize the congregation in 1954 and began programs to relate to new residents of the neighborhood. Among the new programs was a ministry to the deaf.

In 1965, the church underwent a major renovation with movable chairs replacing the pews allowing the nave to be used for events other than worship services.

On May 8, 1973, St. Mark's Church was added to the National Register of Historic Places. It is a contributing property to the Capitol Hill Historic District.

Today, the church sponsors a number of education programs, community groups, concerts and markets its own craft beer known as Winged Lion Lager. The beer is an outgrowth of its popular weekly pub lunch after Sunday services.

== Pipe organ ==
In 1988/89, a pipe organ originally built by the Holtkamp firm in 1958 for Christ Church in Baltimore (opus 1720) was installed by David M. Storey. Four new stops in the Swell division and a new combination action were added. The instrument has 36 stops/39 ranks, the console has three manuals.

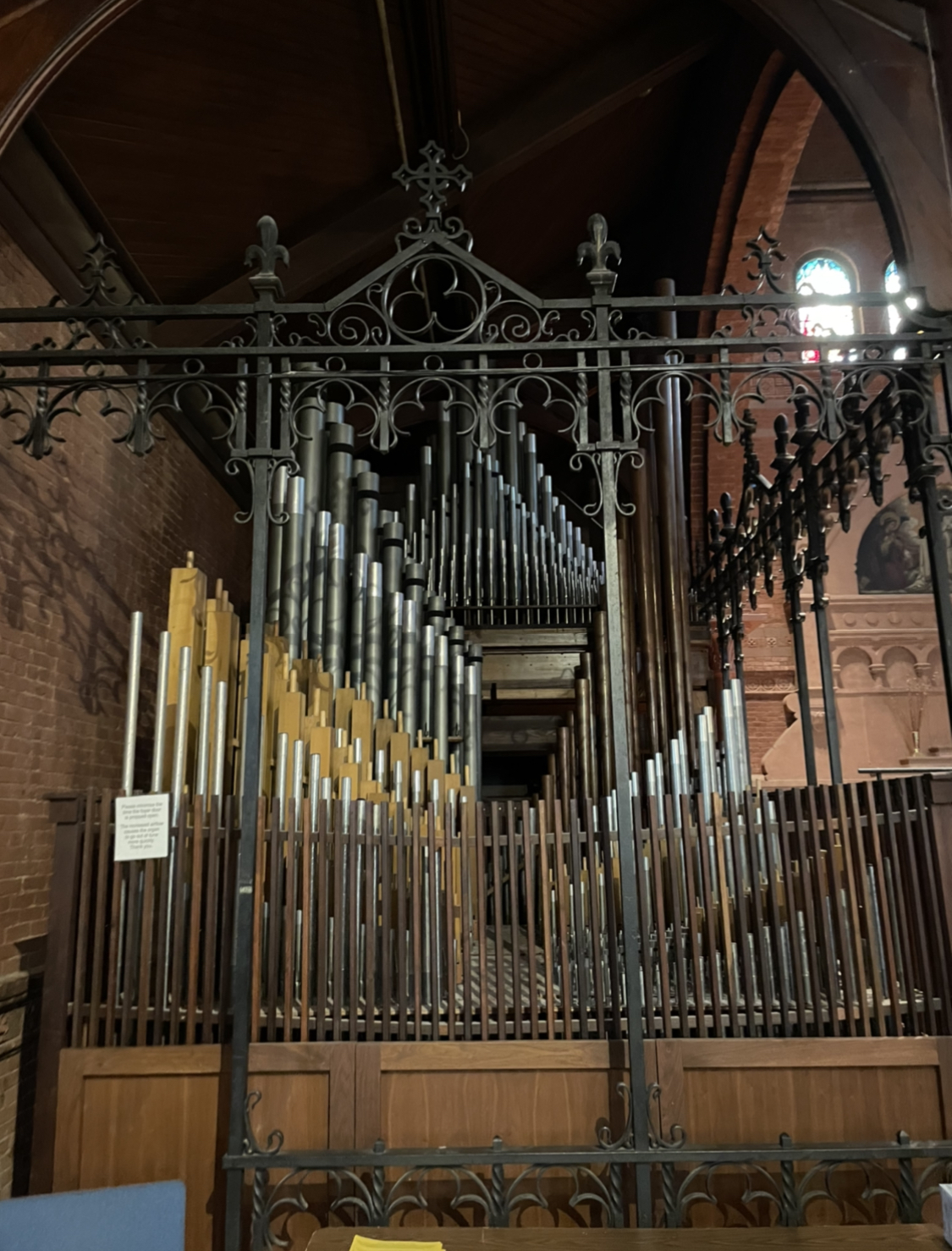
Open pipework of Positiv, Great and Pedal divisions

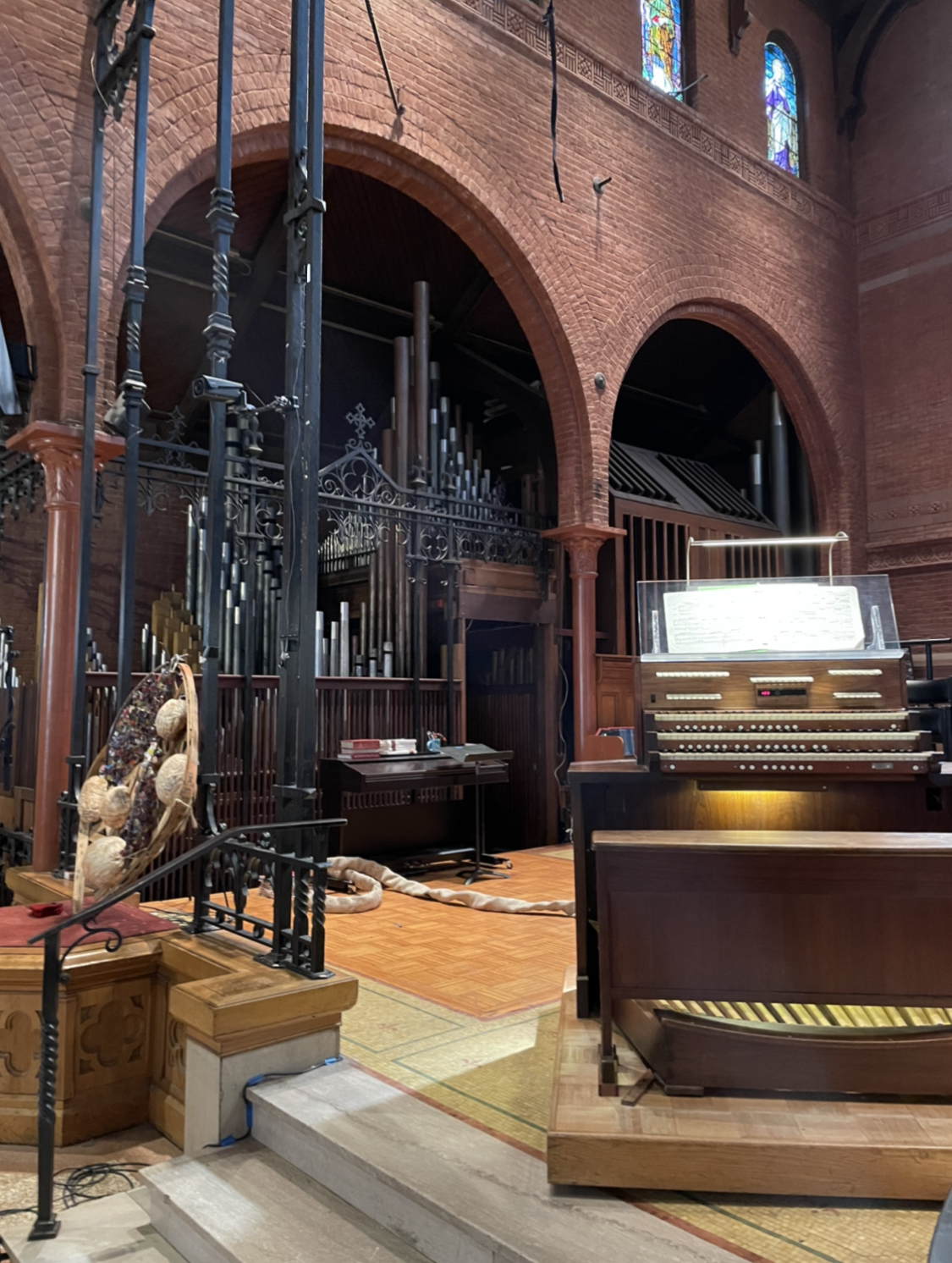
Console with the open pipework

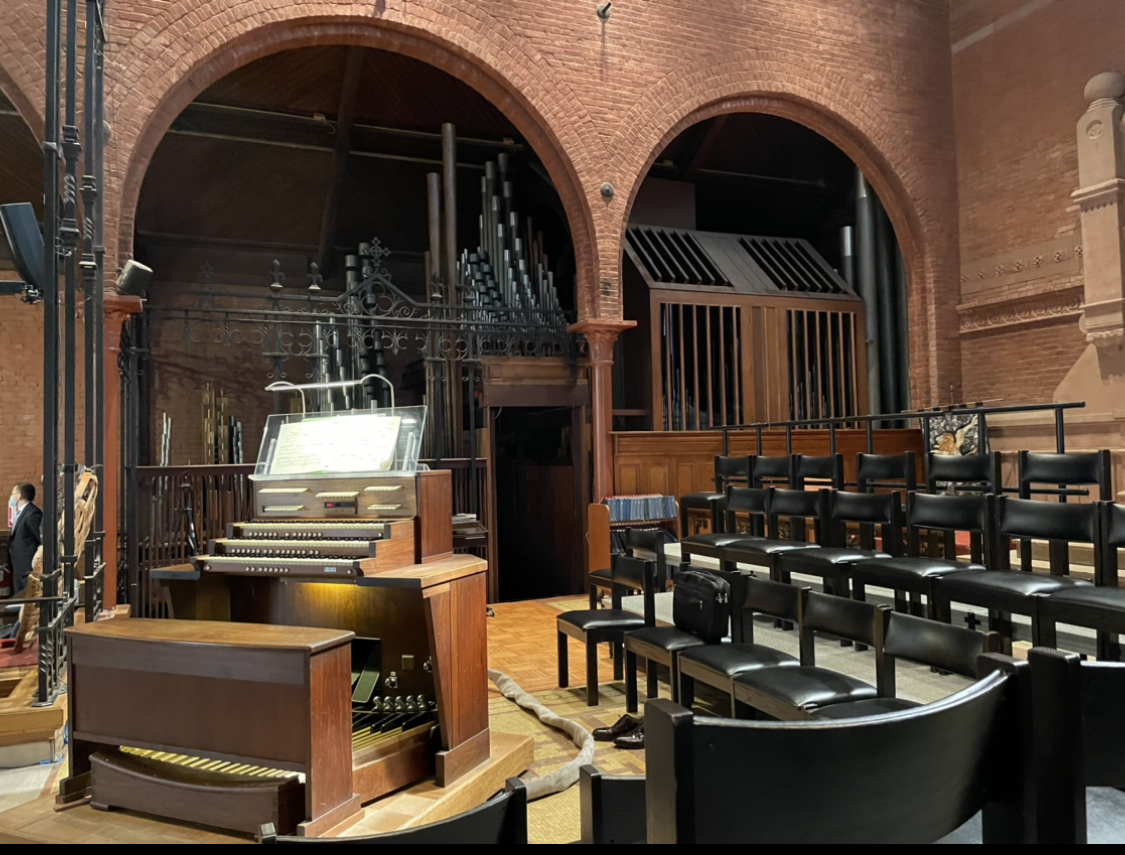
Console with the Swell Box

== See also ==
- National Register of Historic Places listings in the District of Columbia
