= John Macqueen =

John Macqueen (27 June 1895 – 21 June 1969) was a Scottish medical doctor and medical administrator working in Palestine during the British Mandate.

== Biography ==
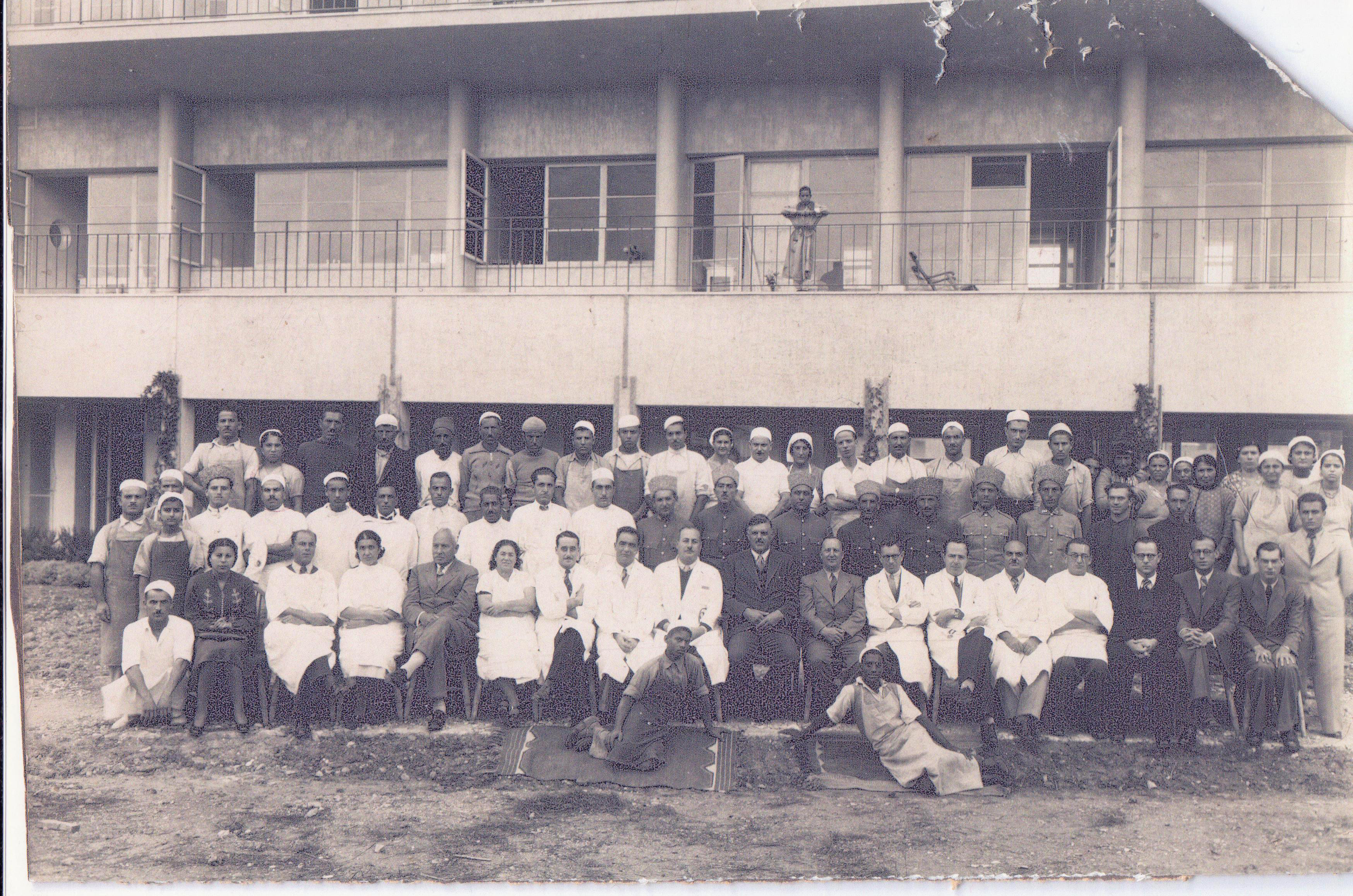
Staff of Haifa Hospital, circa 1939

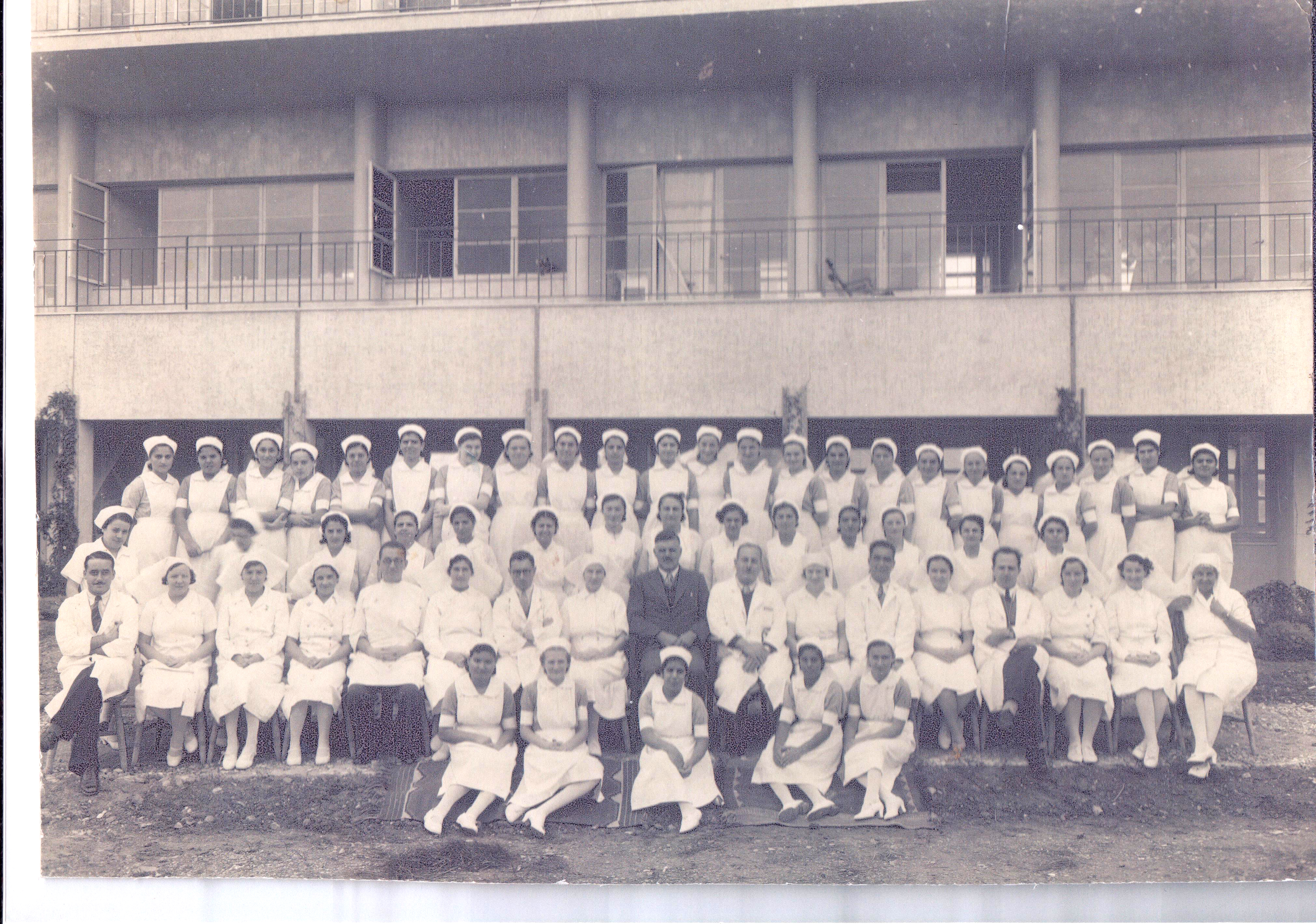
Graduate nurses Haifa Hospital, circa 1939. Dr Macqueen in center

Macqueen was born in the Black Isle, Scotland, and attended school in Inverness. He studied at the University of Edinburgh graduating in Medicine and Surgery in 1914. In September 1914, following the outbreak of the First World War, he joined the Royal Field Artillery serving as a 2nd Lieutenant in France and Flanders. He then became a captain in the Royal Army Medical Corps and saw action with the Mesopotamian Expeditionary Force where he was mentioned twice in despatches.

In September 1919 he joined the Occupied Enemy Territory Administration (OETA) in Palestine and nine months later he was appointed Assistant Principal Medical Officer, based in Jerusalem.

During the late 1920s, as deputy head of the Palestinian Department of Health, Dr Macqueen was involved in the establishment of the first infant welfare centres in Jerusalem's Old City and Bethlehem. It was part of a government program to reduce infant mortality which at that time was 201.27 per 1,000 births. By 1929 there were 27 such centers across the country, mostly funded by non-government bodies. Macqueen complained about the absence of financial support from municipalities, specifically Bethlehem and Bayt Jala.

At that time the Health department, with funding from the Rockefeller Foundation, was active in combating malaria. Trachoma affected more than 60% of the population. Many affected people were treated by the St Johns Eye Hospital, Jerusalem. Leprosy was disappearing, and there were vaccines for the other infectious diseases found in Palestine: rabies, cholera and smallpox.

In 1924 he was appointed Senior Medical Officer in Haifa. In 1930 he was given particular responsibility for the railways and the quarantine of travellers. It was during this period that he completed his medical training. He was awarded an MD in 1931, and a DPH in 1933, both at Edinburgh. In 1931 Macqueen was appointed Senior Medical Officer in Haifa and Samaria District and in 1938 he became director of the new Government Haifa Hospital, designed by Erich Mendelsohn. It had 261 beds and included a nursing school. In the summer of 1941 during an outbreak of Bubonic plague he was in charge of the demolition of the several thousand huts and temporary homes in and around Haifa and introduced a program of rat extermination. This campaign was successful but in 1944 the disease re-appeared killing eleven people in Haifa and spreading up and down Palestine.

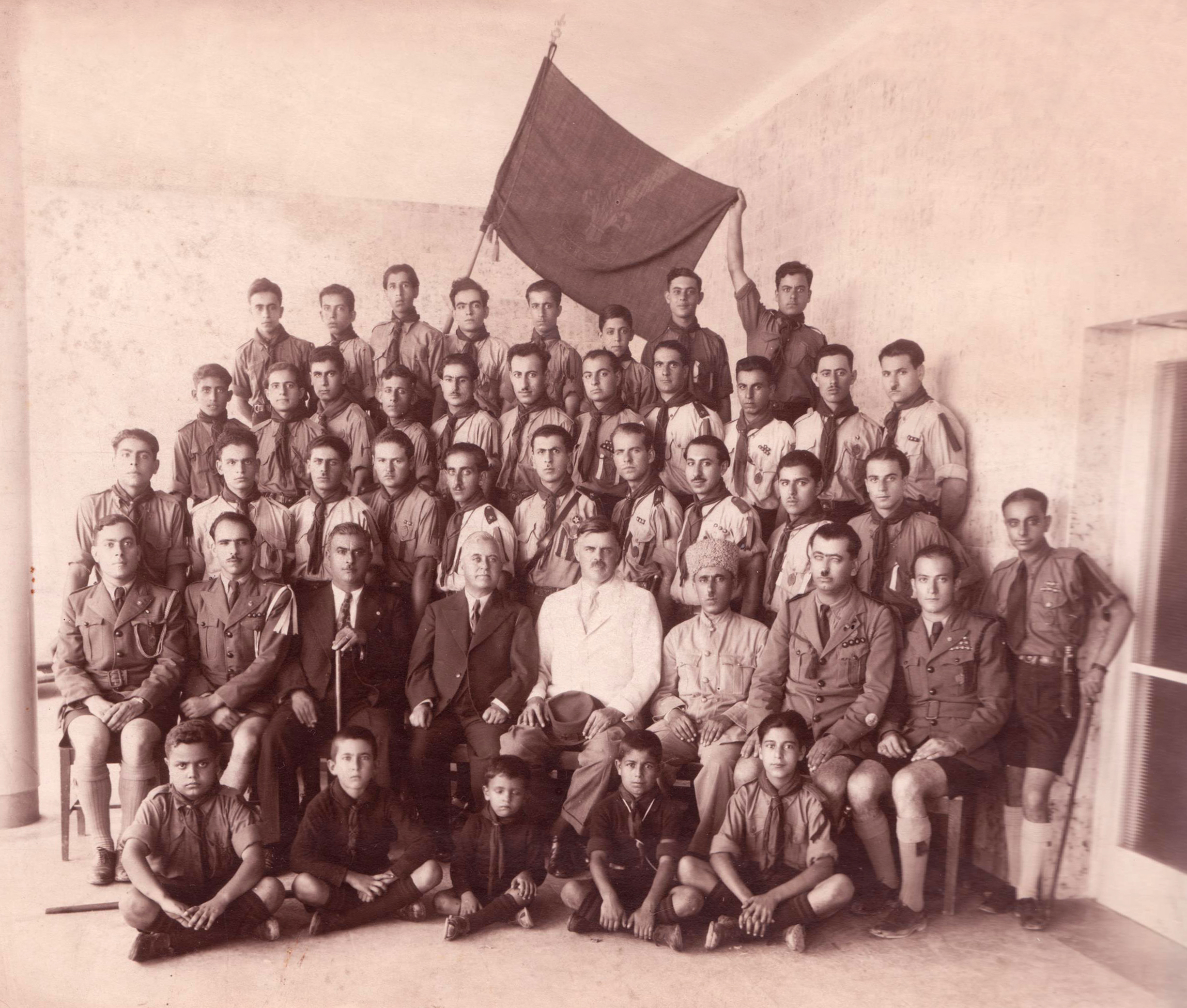
Haifa Maronite Boy Scouts, 1939. Center: Dr John Macqueen Chief Medical Officer for Haifa

The Department of Health was severely under funded. In 1936 he attempted to introduce a health insurance scheme to pay for medical care in Arab villages. This project was halted with the outbreak of the 1936–1939 revolt. In 1938 and again in 1945 he put forward similar proposals for funding health care, modelled on the insurance systems used in England. In a report he pointed out that in Jenin with a population of 50,000 there were four doctors whereas amongst a similar population in Great Britain you would expect to find 25.

Another area of concern was the lack of care for mental patients. There was only an asylum in Bethlehem and a section of Acre prison being maintained by the state; a total of around 160 beds. In 1942 there was a critical fall in conditions in privately run mental hospitals in Tel Aviv when the municipality stopped funding them. At the time the High Commissioner, Sir Harold MacMichael, commented that the treatment of the insane in Palestine "reflected badly on the Government". The 1946 "Survey of Palestine", prepared for the Anglo-American Committee of Inquiry, commented that Government expenditure on health care was low compared to other countries and that medical policy had not been carried out. Provision for control of tuberculosis was "still lacking", accommodation for those with mental diseases was "still inadequate". There was a shortage of trained midwives and the number of infant welfare centers had only risen to 38. Infant mortality amongst the Muslim population was 251 per 1,000 births. Venereal disease had become endemic.

John MacQueen retired in 1946. In 1951 he was elected a member of the Harveian Society of Edinburgh.
