= Orthodox Christian Scout Association =

Israeli Orthodox Scout Association

- Founded: 1968
- Membership: 2,500
- Affiliation: World Organization of the Scout Movement

The Orthodox Scout Association was founded in 1968. As of 2011, the Orthodox Scouts maintain a membership of approximately 2,500, ages 7 to 18. They are aligned to the Arab and Druze Scouts Movement. The emblem features the wreath from the flag of the United Nations.

== See also ==
- Arab Orthodox Society
- Arab and Druze Scouts Movement
- Palestinian Scout Association
