= World Evangelical Alliance =

Global organization

- Logo since 2021
- Type: Interdenominational organization
- Classification: Protestant
- Orientation: Evangelical
- Theology: Evangelical theology
- Leader: Botrus Mansour
- Associations: 9 Regional, 163 National Evangelical Alliances
- Region: Worldwide
- Headquarters: UN offices in New York City, Geneva, Bonn
- Origin: 20 August 1846; London, England, United Kingdom
- Members: 424,255,000 (World Christian Database, 2026)
- Official website: worldea.org

The World Evangelical Alliance (WEA) is an interdenominational organization of Evangelical Christian churches, with over 424 million affiliated members in 2026, that was founded in 1846 in London, England, to unite evangelical Protestants worldwide. WEA is the largest international organization of evangelical churches. It has offices at the United Nations in New York City, Geneva, and Bonn. It brings together nine regional and 143 national evangelical alliances of churches, and over one hundred member organizations. Moreover, a number of international Evangelical denominations are members of the WEA.

== History ==
The organization has its origins in the Evangelical Alliance, a British organization founded in 1846 by 52 Evangelical denominations at Freemasons' Hall in London, England. In 1912, it took the name of World Evangelical Alliance. In 1951, the organization was founded as the "World Evangelical Fellowship" (WEF) by Evangelical leaders from 21 countries at the first general assembly that took place in Woudschoten, Zeist, in the Netherlands. In 2001, after the General Assembly in Kuala Lumpur, Malaysia, WEF became the "World Evangelical Alliance". As of 2005, the WEA had collegiate management under the leadership of Canadian leader Geoff Tunnicliffe. Offices were opened in Vancouver, Canada (Leadership), San Francisco, United States (Information Technology), Washington, D.C. (Publications), and Geneva, Switzerland (International Relations). In 2006, it opened an office at the headquarters of the United Nations (UN) in Geneva, which added to that in New York City.

== Beliefs ==
The Alliance has a Protestant confession of faith. In 1951, a Statement of Faith was developed during the International Convention of Evangelicals. This Statement of Faith has not been changed since.

== Governance ==
The governance of the organization is ensured by a Secretary-General and regional secretaries in the 9 continental member regions. In August 2025, Israeli Baptist elder Botrus Mansour became General Secretary.

=== List of former leaders ===
This list contains the former leaders of the WEA since 1951.

- Roy Cattell (United Kingdom) and J. Elwin Wright (United States), co-secretaries, (1951–1953)
- A.J. Dain (United Kingdom) and J. Elwin Wright (United States), co-secretaries, (1953–1958)
- Fred Ferris (United States), International Secretary, United States, (1958–1962)
- Gilbert Kirby (United Kingdom), International Secretary, (1962–1966)
- Dennis Clark (Canada), International Secretary, (1966–1970)
- Gordon Landreth (United Kingdom), interim International Secretary, (1970–1971)
- Clyde Taylor (United States), International Secretary, (1971–1975)
- Waldron Scott (United States), General Secretary, (1975–1980)
- Wade Coggins (United States), Interim General Secretary, (1981)
- David M. Howard (United States), International Director (1982–1992)
- Agustin Vencer (Philippines), International Director (1992–2001)
- Gary Edmonds (United States), Secretary General (2002–2004)
- Geoff Tunnicliffe (Canada, Secretary General (2005–2014)
- Efraim Tendero (Philippines), Secretary General (2015–2021)
- Thomas Schirrmacher (Germany), Secretary General (2021–2024)

== Commissions ==
In 1974, the WEA created six commissions to better achieve its mandates.

- Alliance Engagement: Strengthen existing evangelical alliances and create new ones.
- Church Engagement: Provide programs and resources to churches for different social groups.
- Public Engagement: Advocate for migration and refugees, peace.
- Global Advocacy: Coordinate partnerships with international organizations, such as the UN.
- Global Theology: Reflect on topics of evangelical theology, and issues of importance to churches and society around the world, monitor religious freedom.
- Global Witness: Coordinate evangelistic activities.

== Statistics ==
In 2025, WEA brought together 143 national alliances of churches. In 2020, the World Christian Database, the online version of the World Christian Encyclopedia, published by Edinburgh University Press, reported 152 million members of the WEA. Moreover, the WEA unites only a certain percentage of evangelical churches, because some churches are not members of a Christian denomination or national alliance.

== Membership ==
The World Evangelical Alliance embraces member-bodies whose identity and vocation are rooted in what it understands as historic biblical Christianity. WEA affirms and seeks the biblical unity of Christ's body, the Church, celebrating the diversity of practices and theological emphases consistent with the WEA Statement of Faith, recognizing the existing dynamic tension between unity and diversity.

There are three types of membership, each with its distinct qualifications and responsibilities:

- Regional and national alliances are regional evangelical fellowships and their national fellowships/alliances.
- Affiliate members are independently incorporated organizations with their own specific ministries and accountability, an international scope of ministry, and the capacity and authority to serve in and beyond the WEA community.
- Church networks and denominations are networks of churches (located in one or a number of countries), in agreement with the statement of faith and objectives of the World Evangelical Alliance.

== General Assemblies ==
A General Assembly takes place every six years in a country that differs depending on the year. It is a time of prayer and conferences for national alliances and associations. It is an opportunity for decision making and the training of leaders of each country. The last GA was held in 2019 in Jakarta in Indonesia and the leaders notably committed to building alliances in the 62 countries that do not have them and getting more involved in the religious freedom.

- 1951: Amsterdam (Woudschoten), Netherlands, August 4–11
- 1953: Clarens, Switzerland, July 27–31
- 1956: Rhode Island, United States, August 27–31
- 1962: Hong Kong, April 25 – May 2
- 1968: Lausanne, Switzerland, May 4–10
- 1974: Château d'Oex, Switzerland, July 25–29
- 1980: London (Hoddesdon) England, UK, March 24–28
- 1986: Singapore, June 23–27
- 1992: Manila, Philippines, June 21–26
- 1997: Abbotsford, British Columbia, Canada, May 8–15
- 2001: Kuala Lumpur, Malaysia, May 4–10
- 2008: Pattaya, Thailand, October 25–30
- 2014: Seoul, South Korea, [canceled]
- 2019: Jakarta, Indonesia, November 7–14

== Publications ==
There are two quarterly publications: a journal Evangelical Review of Theology (published on behalf by Paternoster Periodicals since 1977) and a newsletter Theological News (since 1969). Books are published occasionally.

== Global engagements ==
=== Development ===
The fight against poverty is a major concern of the WEA. Publications and meetings of the Alliance are the means used to influence and inspire development initiatives and actions humanitarian in churches, NGOs and political. It is the origin of the Micah Challenge, an initiative to educate Christians and promote decision making among leaders.

=== Inter- and intra-faith participation ===
On June 5, 2010, Geoff Tunnicliffe, the International Director of the WEA, appeared alongside the leaders of the Pontifical Council for Promoting Christian Unity and the World Council of Churches (WCC) in a press conference, entitled “Christian unity today”, at the Edinburgh 2010 Conference. The gathering marked the centennial of the 1910 World Missionary Conference. In the same year, on 17 October 2010, Olav Fykse Tveit, the general secretary of the WCC, gave an invited address to the 3rd International Congress of the Lausanne Movement. In the address he said, "we are called to participate in the one mission of God". The World Evangelical Alliance, Geoff Tunnicliffe, the International Director and other WEA leaders were involved at each level in the development of the programme, and helped choose its participants. In May 2014 the Lausanne International Student Ministry Global Leadership Network became a "docked network" with the WEA's Mission Commission.

On 22 January 2015, the WCC and WEA announced plans for closer cooperation, worship and witness. In the same year, in June 2015, the WEA reported that discussions with the Pontifical Council for Promoting Christian Unity were finalised, and that "the open questions of the 16th century are almost answered". The WEA representatives also reported that "still open is the question to what extend [sic] evangelical Christians who stem from the reformation churches have full access to salvation according to the catholic view".

On May 24, 2017, the WEA participated in a two-day Global Christian Forum meeting with the World Council of Churches, officials from the Vatican and Eastern Orthodox Churches, and the Pentecostal World Federation to facilitate moves 'towards greater oneness in Christ'. The meeting was held at the WCC's Bossey Ecumenical Institute. Some criticism was voiced of the WEA for lack of consultation about this move, the absence of regional and national discussion, or a vote of the General Assembly prior to the meeting.

=== Advocacy for human rights and freedom of religion ===
The WEA is also advocating for the respect of human rights, including freedom of religion and belief for all. Furthermore, its involvement with UN mechanisms (Human Rights and other) has grown into a dedicated department, the "Global Advocacy Department".

The WEA has consultative status with the Economic and Social Council of the UN (ECOSOC) since 1997, which allows it to engage in the UN mechanisms with statements, reports, and recommendations, notably as part of the Human Rights Council sessions and the Universal Periodic Review (UPR).

In the context of the UPR, several recommendations from the WEA have been reiterated by States, meaning that recommendations formulated in a very similar way than those suggested by the WEA, appear in the final recommendations addressed to the State under review, on behalf of a reviewing State. This was the case for its reports regarding human trafficking in Switzerland (2012) and Canada (2018), its report on religious freedom in Bhutan in 2019, and its report on Iran in 2020 for which the WEA successfully advocated for the inclusion of “Christian converts” as a group whose religious freedom should be respected by Iran.

Regarding the Human Rights Council sessions, an example of the WEA’s impact was reported by Evangelical Focus. In 2020, the WEA made a statement, as part of the UPR's outcome adoption of Spain, mentioning unreasonably high standards for non-Catholic religious communities in Catalonia and discrimination against retired Protestant pastors who have been excluded from the pension system since Franco’s regime. The Spanish ambassador responded to WEA’s statement at the Human Rights Council session and both recommendations were accepted. At the end of 2020, the Evangelical Council of Catalonia announced that an agreement had been reached with the municipality of L'Hospitalet de Llobregat to avoid the closure of five churches.

== Criticism ==
=== Neglect of the suffering church in China ===
The WEA was criticised for its positive assessment of the situation of the churches in China after meeting with Chinese government-approved representatives in 2009. ChinaAid and Church in Chains claimed, "There are many Christians in China who are not free to worship, do not have Bibles of their own and are not free to organise their own affairs and this situation is not mentioned in your press release… our concern is that you have turned your back on these brothers and sisters." One exemplary case of abuse, that of imprisoned Uyghur Christian Alimujiang Yimiti, was raised in the criticism, but the WEA did not respond in detail.

== See also ==
- Charismatic Christianity
  - Assemblies of God
  - Finished Work Pentecostalism
  - Holiness Pentecostalism
  - Third Wave of the Holy Spirit
- Christian ecumenism
  - Calvary Chapel Association (CCA)
  - World Evangelical Congregational Fellowship (WECF)
- Decision theology
- Dispensationalism
- List of the largest Protestant denominations
- Protestantism in the United Kingdom
- Protestantism in the United States
  - Evangelicalism in the United States
  - Pentecostalism in the United States
- Worship service (evangelicalism)
