= List of rabbinical schools =

Following is a listing of rabbinical schools, organized by denomination. The emphasis of the training will differ correspondingly: Orthodox semikhah centers on the study of Talmud-based halacha (Jewish law), while in other programs, the emphasis may shift to "the other functions of a modern rabbi such as preaching, counseling, and pastoral work.” Conservative yeshivot occupy a position midway, in that their training places (significantly) more emphasis on halacha and Talmud than other non-Orthodox programs.

== Reform ==
In Reform Judaism, rabbinic programs span five years and incorporate a master's degree. Studies are mandated in pastoral care, the historical development of Judaism, academic biblical criticism, in addition to the study of traditional rabbinic texts. Rabbinical students also are required to gain practical rabbinic experience by working at a congregation as a rabbinic intern during each year of study from year one onwards. All Reform seminaries ordain women and LGBTQ people as rabbis and cantors.

- The seminary of Reform Judaism in the United States is Hebrew Union College-Jewish Institute of Religion. It has campuses in Cincinnati, New York City, and Los Angeles.
- In Israel, the Jerusalem campus of Hebrew Union College is the only seminary for training Reform Jewish clergy.
- In the United Kingdom, the Reform and Liberal movements maintain Leo Baeck College in London for the training and ordination of rabbis.
- In Germany the Abraham Geiger College trains and ordains candidates for the Progressive rabbinate.
- In Buenos Aires, Argentina, the Reform Movement maintains the Instituto Iberoamericano de Formación Rabinica Reformista (Iberoamerican Institute for Training Reform Rabbis). (Note: The IIFRR serves the Latin American Reform communities and has had online teaching as part of its curriculum, counting as teachers and supporting lecturers rabbis from the Reform communities throughout Latin America, North America, Israel and Europe.)

== Conservative ==
Conservative institutions, in ordaining men, women and LGBT people as rabbis and cantors, provide an "integrated program" of academic learning and professional development, spanning five or six years.

In addition to knowledge and mastery of the study of Talmud and halakhah, Conservative semikhah also requires that its rabbinical students receive intensive training in Tanakh, classical biblical commentaries, biblical criticism, Midrash, Kabbalah and Hasidut, the historical development of Judaism from antiquity to modernity, Jewish ethics, the halakhic methodology of Conservative responsa, and classical and modern works of Jewish theology and philosophy.

Conservative programs include also synagogue administration, pastoral care, chaplaincy, non-profit management, and navigating the modern world in a Jewish context, and incorporate professional placement. Students are required to study for one year - usually the program's third - in Israel.

Ordination is granted at:

- The Rabbinical School of the Jewish Theological Seminary of America in New York
- Ziegler School of Rabbinic Studies in Los Angeles
- Schechter Institute of Jewish Studies in Jerusalem (Jerusalem's Conservative Yeshiva does not grant ordination)
- Budapest University of Jewish Studies in Budapest, Hungary
- Zacharias Frankel College in Potsdam
- Seminario Rabinico Latinoamericano in Buenos Aires, Argentina

== Orthodox ==
Orthodox yeshivas are institutions of Torah study generally, "Torah lishma", and are not focused on the training of rabbis per se. Their curricula emphasize Talmud along with the study of halacha (Jewish law); if less emphasized, Tanakh (bible) and Jewish thought / Musar / Hasidic philosophy are also studied. (Orthodox yeshivas do not allow women to enroll.) Rabbinical training proper - often culminating up to a decade of study (Note: Membership in the Rabbinical Council of America requires at least six year’s yeshiva study; see discussion under Master of Rabbinic Studies.) - generally takes one of three forms.

Many yeshivot host a specific Rabbinic kollel, or other program, focusing on Semikhah (ordination); these are then an integral part of the yeshiva. These programs build students' ability to "pasken", i.e. decide cases in Halacha, extending and relying on the textual and analytical skills built over the several prior years of Talmud study; this, in parallel, includes preparation of the specific sections of Shulchan Aruch required for certification-testing (always kashrut; often shabbat, niddah; sometimes avelut, marriage laws). See Yeshiva § Jewish law and § Talmud study. These programs span 2–4 years, depending on the topics covered. Alongside their Rabbinic studies, students here typically participate in the Yeshiva's senior Talmud shiur. Institutions:

- Most Religious Zionist Rabbis are trained at Mercaz HaRav and / or the various Hesder Yeshivot (well known are Kerem B'Yavneh, Hakotel, Sha'alvim, and Har Etzion; the largest is Sderot) typically preparing for the "Semikhah of the Rabbanut"
- Haredi yeshivot in Israel generally do not offer a "semikha program" per se, although students often prepare to be tested by the Rosh Yeshiva. Well known Ashkenazi (Lithuanian) yeshivot are Mir and Ponevezh; the leading Sephardi yeshiva is Porat Yosef. Students here also, often sit the Rabbanut exams.
- In the US, well known Haredi semachot are through "Rabbinical Seminary of America", Telz, and Ner Yisroel (others, such as Chaim Berlin and "Lakewood", as at Israeli Yeshivot, do not commonly ordain).
- In Europe Gateshead Talmudical College is probably the best known; others include the Yeshiva of Aix-les-Bains and Torat Chayim in Moscow; elsewhere, Yeshiva Gedolah in Sydney, Yeshiva Gedolah of Johannesburg.
- Many Hasidic dynasties have their own yeshivot - see for example under Satmar, Belz, Bobov, Pupa, and Breslov - focusing on general learning as opposed to semicha, which is granted on a limited basis as at Charedi yeshivot.
- The Chabad-Lubavitch Hasidim operate the global Tomchei Tmimim network, many of which, in contrast, include a semicha program. Since the 1950's, unlike in other streams, semicha is obtained by the bulk of Chabad yeshiva students: the Lubavitcher Rebbe instructed students to obtain ordination before getting married; formally studying kashrut and shabbos before starting a home; although, this often with a more practical orientation, and spanning one year, the final of four.

Some institutions specifically focus on rabbinic training; these are essentially "post-graduate", admitting students with an advanced Yeshiva background. These programs typically prepare all of the above topics, and extend the curriculum to other applicable areas of Jewish law (e.g. laws of the synagogue and Jewish prayer, the moadim); these often place a parallel emphasis on "hashkafa", i.e. a systematic discussion of contemporary issues in light of Jewish philosophy; they may also offer some element of "practical Rabbinics" (e.g. homiletics and public speaking, life-cycle events, pastoral care), always secondary, however. These programs average 3 years, but may be up to 5 years. Institutions well known for their Rabbinic training include:

- In Israel: the Meretz Kollel, Ohr Torah Stone's Straus Rabbinical Seminary, and Machon Ariel which trains Rabbis and Dayanim (Rabbinic Judges); Kollel Eretz Hemda trains Dayanim; there are several specialized kollels preparing candidates for the Chief Rabbinate Dayanut test. See a more complete listing in the Hebrew, at category כוללי אברכים בארץ ישראל. The Machon HaGavoah LeTorah at Bar-Ilan University offers a Halacha program, and subsequent Rabbinical training, to students with a Yeshiva background.
- Israel-based programs preparing Rabbis for Diaspora communities: The Shehebar Sephardic Center, The Jerusalem Kollel, Ohr Somayach's Ohr La'Golah, Aish HaTorah's semicha program, The Center for Kehilla Development, Ner Le'Elef, Mizrachi's Musmachim program as well as its Manhigut Toranit program (advanced Semicha - “Rav Ir”), Institute for Community Rabbis in the Diaspora (Ariel Institute), and similarly, Eretz Hemda.
- In Europe, the leading institutions are Rabbinerseminar zu Berlin and Judith Lady Montefiore College
- Most American Modern Orthodox Rabbis are trained at RIETS, the Rabbi Isaac Elchanan Theological Seminary, and some at Hebrew Theological College. A number earn Semicha in Israel at Yeshivat HaMivtar (Straus).
- A small number of Rabbis are ordained at Yeshivat Chovevei Torah, a more liberal "Open Orthodox" Yeshiva in New York. Its sister institution, Yeshiva Maharat, controversially ordains women Rabbis; one other Orthodox Yeshiva, Beit Midrash Har'el, also ordains women, and similarly with some controversy (for discussion of other Orthodox women's programs, see Women rabbis and Torah scholars § Orthodox Judaism generally (Note: In recent years some midrashot offer specialized programs (although not ordination) in Rabbinic-level Halakha, including Talmud-intensive study. Two formal professional certifications are offered: Nishmat trains women as Yoatzot Halacha, advisors in the laws of Family purity; Lindenbaum, through a joint program, prepares women as to'anot, advocates in religious courts for matters relating to divorce. Three programs mirror the Chief Rabbinate’s ordination requirements for men: Ein HaNetziv trains students as "Teachers of Halacha"; Lindenbaum in "Halachik leadership"; Matan as "Halachik Respondents".)).
- Common among Hassidim are Kollelim, such as Mechon L'Hoyroa and The "Chicago Chassidishe Kollel", among others, although they are many times not affiliated with any specific Hasidic sect. These Kollelim typically focus on Halacha, and will usually have their members tested by leading Poskim.
- Various Chabad institutions are located globally, and include the Rabbinical College of America, Rabbinical College of Australia and New Zealand, Rabbinical College of Canada, Rabbinical College of Pretoria; the preparation and testing here, certifying community Rabbis, is standard, and thus more extensive and in more depth than at Tomchei Tmimim above.

Outside of these, it is common also for a student to prepare material independently, so as to be tested by a well known Rosh Yeshiva or posek, so called "private semicha" (many from the late R. Zalman Nechemia Goldberg). This Semikhah certifies solely the holder's ability, and thus right, to pasken (i.e. "Heter Hora'ah"; see, again, Semikhah § Concept). Recently, several institutions are established around semicha-testing (i.e. as opposed to Rabbinical training); these publish syllabi, with a corresponding learning program, and may provide online training, and are then a hybrid of Yeshiva and private; they are sometimes referred to as "on-line semicha programs." Not intended to produce community Rabbis, and testing a single Halakha-topic at a time (and where the focus may be applied as opposed to theoretical), in some cases, the study-program can be completed in one year. (Note: Although these programs are sometimes criticized, their syllabi are standard - although their focus may differ as mentioned - and their role, in fact, is intended as providing structured learning in Halacha to those outside of a formal yeshiva; and their offerings then include non-semicha courses. See the discussion re “Non-practicing rabbis” under Rabbi § Functions. As for the above, these programs assume a level of scholarship typically acquired over several years in Yeshiva. Note that the RCA does not include the time spent in an on-line program towards its requirement re years in Yeshiva.)

- Semicha-testing programs: Pirchei Shoshanim, Iyun Halacha, Chonen Daas, Virtual Halacha Program, Kinyan Hilchos Shabbos, Nefesh HaChaim
- Chabad programs: The Institute For Rabbinical Studies, Machon Smicha, HSSP, Machon Limud Halacha, Havineini Institute, Lema'an Yilmedu (these largely mirror Tomchei Tmimim)
- WebYeshiva, a fully online institution, offers semikha culminating a four year Halakha-program.

== Other denominations ==
- The Reconstructionist Rabbinical College is located in Pennsylvania; it ordains women as well as men (and openly LGBT people) as rabbis and cantors. The first three years of the five-year program cover “Jewish beliefs, texts and traditions” - as approached by Reconstructionist Judaism - and include a year of study in Israel; the final two years center on an “immersive field education”. In 2015 the Reconstructionist Rabbinical College voted to accept rabbinical students in interfaith relationships, making Reconstructionist Judaism the first type of Judaism to officially allow rabbis in relationships with non-Jewish partners.
- Jewish Renewal has an ordination program known as ALEPH. The program - which has no central campus - comprises 60 credits of graduate level study, over 5 years, in the areas of Talmud and Halakha, Tanach, philosophy, history, and Hassidut and Kabbalah; the plurality of the courses are in practical Rabbinics, here preparing graduates to function as “Kli Kodesh” or "vessels of holiness". ALEPH ordains women as well as men as rabbis and cantors. It also ordains openly LGBT people.
- Humanistic Judaism has the International Institute for Secular Humanistic Judaism, which currently has two centers of activity: one in Jerusalem and the other in Farmington Hills, Michigan. Both ordain women as well as men as rabbis, and do not ordain cantors, though they did so previously. Both ordain openly LGBTQIA people. Ordination requires 62 credit hours, completion of a master's degree, and a Rabbinical internship and practicum.
- The Union for Traditional Judaism (UTJ), an offshoot of the right wing of Conservative Judaism, operated the non-denominational Institute of Traditional Judaism (ITJ), also known as "The Metivta"; ITJ ran from 1991 through 2010. The Metivta provided a traditional Semikhah Program for men only, focused on Talmud and codes, as well the advanced Semikha Yadin Yadin. Graduates of the rabbinical program were hired by both Conservative and Modern Orthodox synagogues, although the RCA did not recognize the ordination. ITJ did not ordain openly LGBT men. The positioning of UTJ is sometimes described as “Conservadox”.

== Non-denominational ==
- The Rabbinical Seminary International, est 1955, is a rabbinical seminary in New York, which ordains women as well as men (and openly LGBT people) as rabbis; it does ordain cantors. RSI is a transdenominational rabbinical seminary in the Neo-Hasidic tradition. It is the oldest non-denominational rabbincal program in North America. Its program is project based, and culminates with a final thesis and examination; most candidates complete the course in two years.
- The Academy for Jewish Religion, in New York City, since 1956, and the unrelated Academy for Jewish Religion-California, in Los Angeles, since 2000, have been rabbinic (and cantorial) seminaries unaffiliated with any denomination or movement. These seminaries are accepted by all non-Orthodox rabbis as valid rabbinical seminaries, and ordain women as well as men (and openly LGBT people) as rabbis and cantors. The ordination program at both takes 5 years, and develops proficiency in texts and law, as well as education, counseling, and chaplaincy; both include a Master's degree.
- Hebrew Seminary, est 1992, is a non-denominational, online only, rabbinical school in Illinois near Chicago which uniquely trains both deaf and hearing students; it ordains women, men, and openly LGBTQIA people. The program spans 5 years, requiring a thesis and a comprehensive exam; a distinctive aspect of the curriculum is the incorporation of Kabbalah and related meditative practices, in addition to the standard Rabbinic components. All graduates, hearing and deaf, are required to attain fluency in American Sign Language.
- Hebrew College, near Boston, includes a similarly unaffiliated rabbinic school, opened in the Fall of 2003. The 5 year ordination program includes professional and leaderhip skills; while the text based elements - Tanakh, and Talmud and Halakha - have a required Bet Midrash element. Graduates earn a masters degree.
- The Midrasha at the Oranim Academic College in Israel, in partnership with the Shalom Hartman Institute, since 2014 offers a pluralistic ordination to both men and women. The program’s curriculum, spanning three years, addresses some of the "most compelling topics for Israeli society", and intends that "Israeli Judaism should be open and inclusive". Cohorts comprise candidates with a significant background in Torah studies (who are additionally native speakers of Hebrew).
- A "new generation" of seminaries offers prospective rabbinic students the opportunity to obtain Semikha in a "nontraditional" manner, and at lower cost (although with some controversy). Programs may require a year or two, depending on candidates’ prior academic degrees and Jewish community experience.
  - The Ateret Tzvi Academy, of The Open Yeshiva, est. 1998, offers a 4-year part time Rabbinics course for students wishing to receive ordination; topics - text or workshop based - include Halakha and Talmud, Hasidic thought, the festivals and shabbat, and practical Rabbinics.
  - Mesifta Adath Wolkowisk offers an off-campus ordination program for mid-career working Jewish professionals - typically a cantor, religious school educator, college Judaic instructor, or hospital chaplain - “who can readily document competence and expertise in traditional Judaic academic disciplines”. The course of study at its Rabbinical Academy, est. c. 2000, is "individually tailored", where a program is developed for each student as a function of their background at application; ordination is granted following a comprehensive examination. There is no minimum time required for ordination.
  - The Jewish Spiritual Leaders Institute, est 2010, offers a one year training program, meeting in weekly online classes via the Internet, which ordains women as well as men as unaffiliated rabbis to meet the needs of unaffiliated Jews as well as interfaith couples and their families. It subscribes to Jewish Universalism, promoting religious tolerance and asserting that there are many paths to 'the One.' It does ordain openly LGBT people.
  - The Pluralistic Rabbinical Seminary, est 2019, offers a two-year online rabbinical ordination program to candidates “who already have through prior academic learning or experience the education needed to enter rabbinical school at the third or fourth year”. It trains men and women. Rabbinic educators are Conservative, Reform and Orthodox rabbis, but the semicha is postdenominational. The program has ordained two cohorts of students.
  - The Etz Haim International European Rabbinical Academy, is a post-denominational rabbinical school based in Italy, and established c. 2024. It provides flexible, high-level learning through an online format tailored to students’ needs. The two year asynchronous program covers traditional texts and material as well as practical rabbinics, "offering a learning experience steeped in history, philosophy, and spirituality". Faculty represent diverse rabbinic traditions.
