= David Fink =

Israeli Orthodox rabbi

Rabbi David Fink דוד פינק

Personal life
- Occupation: Rabbi

Religious life
- Religion: Judaism

Jewish leader
- Position: Rabbi and decisor of Jewish law
- Yeshiva: Various
- Residence: Jerusalem, Israel

David (sometimes: Dovid) Fink (Hebrew: דוד פינק) is an Israeli Orthodox rabbi and expert in halacha and Jewish medical ethics.

== Biography ==
Fink lived in the United States before making aliyah to Israel. Fink received his Rabbinic ordination from Yeshivas Itri and the Mir yeshiva in Jerusalem, and was awarded his Ph.D in Semitic languages and Linguistics from Yale University. Fink has been actively teaching for more than two decades and is a well-known and an authoritative posek in Jerusalem.

== Yeshiva faculty ==
Fink has been part of the faculty or taught at the following yeshivot in the United States and Israel:

- Yeshiva University (YU Torah)
- Yeshivat Simchat Shelomo
- Yeshivat Hamivtar
- Aish HaTorah
- Mayanot Institute of Jewish Studies
- Webyeshiva
- Midreshet Lindenbaum
- Sulam Yaakov Rabbinical Institute

== Publications ==
Fink is a member of the editorial board of the Journal of Medical Ethics and Halacha published by the Dr. Falk Schlesinger Institute for Medical-Halachic Research at Shaare Zedek Medical Center, Jerusalem.

- Arba`ah Turim of Rabbi Jacob ben Asher on Medical Ethics, Journal of Medical Ethics and Halacha
