= WebYeshiva =

Information
- Rosh yeshiva: Chaim Brovender
- Website: www.webyeshiva.org

WebYeshiva.org is an online yeshiva and midrasha. Classes are presented live and interactively, replicating the structure of a traditional shiur. Its offering extends through Semicha (rabbinic ordination). It was founded in November 2007 by Chaim Brovender and is directed by Jeffrey Saks. WebYeshiva is a project of the Academy for Torah Initiatives and Directions (ATID). It is headquartered on HaNassi St., in Jerusalem, near the President's House.

== Structure and approach ==
The Yeshiva's goal is to offer Torah classes to students around the world via the internet; it draws on the large resource of quality teachers with high levels of study and knowledge in and around Jerusalem.

WebYeshiva offers advanced course-based Torah study for men and women, including classes in Talmud (4 levels offered), Tanach (Bible), Halacha (Jewish law), Chassidut, and Machshava (Jewish philosophy); some are offered in various languages (Hungarian, Spanish, Russian, Hebrew, Yiddish). Its offering thus replicates that of a traditional Yeshiva; see Yeshiva § Curriculum.

Students may learn live, fully interacting with the teacher and other students. For students who cannot attend live, all classes are recorded in several formats (mp3, mp4, WebEx) and archived within 24 hours. This gives students the option of downloading the classes and learning on their own time.

== Programs ==
In 2010, WebYeshiva launched TorahTutors.org, which aimed to create programs fitted to the needs of the user, including professionals looking for chavruta (learning partner) study, Jewish day school students requiring a tutor for Torah subjects, or Jewish homeschooling.

In 2013, WebYeshiva launched an advanced track, the Halacha Mastery Program, focused on in-depth, source based study of the major practical halachic topics - Shabbat, Kashrut, Niddah, Avelut. The program is offered to men and women with a sufficient background, and spans three-years (it is tuition-based; courses may be taken either synchronously over three years or via self-paced archive study). It comprises six courses (~22 weeks each), three mandatory and three elective, where each requires sitting a midterm and then final examination. Students who complete all courses and pass the tests, receive a certificate.

Male students who complete the Halacha Mastery Program may proceed to an intensive Semicha (ordination) track. The ordination requires that students complete three further examined courses: an intensive course covering the principles underpinning Rabbinic decision making; Shabbat observance in detail, applying these principles (content mirroring the semicha test of Rabbi Zalman Nechemia Goldberg); a survey course covering other areas of Shabbat. In 2017, WebYeshiva first gave rabbinical ordination, with the Semicha certificate signed by Rabbis Chaim Brovender and David Fink (see faculty listing below).

From 2026, qualifying students may access the Machshava Mastery Program, which covers the "most important debates in classic and modern Jewish philosophy." Modelled on the Halacha program, the certification entails a structured discussion of the central ideas and major works of Jewish thought. It spans 2.5 years, and comprises two required survey courses, and four elective courses.

Previously WebYeshiva offered an online Sofer Stam certification program for men. The (discontinued) course was ten weeks, with each session lasting 90 minutes and upon completion of all course materials and passing the exam students may be certified as a Sofer Stam, a Jewish ritual scribe.

== Notable partnerships ==
Webyeshiva partners with the S.Y. Agnon House in Jerusalem by offering courses on the writer's works that are broadcast directly from his residence.

== Notable educators ==
Founders

- Rabbi Chaim Brovender is the Rosh Yeshiva of WebYeshiva.org and President of ATID. He is the founding Rosh Yeshiva of Yeshivat Hamivtar and Michlelet Bruria (today, Midreshet Lindenbaum). Rabbi Brovender was one of the first Orthodox Jewish rabbis to teach Talmud to women, and most WebYeshiva classes have both male and female students.
- Rabbi Jeffrey Saks is the founding Director of ATID, and as of February 2019 is editor of the journal Tradition. He received his bachelor's degree, master's degree, and rabbinical ordination from Yeshiva University.

Other notable faculty

- Rabbi David Fink, a well-known and an authoritative posek in Jerusalem. He received his Rabbinic ordination from Yeshivas Itri and the Mir Yeshiva in Jerusalem, and was awarded his Ph.D. in Semitic languages and linguistics from Yale University. He has been actively teaching for more than three decades.
- Rabbi Yitzchak Blau, Rosh Yeshiva of Yeshivat Orayta. He was Rosh Kollel at Yeshivat Shvilei Hatorah, and previously taught at Yeshivat Hamivtar and at the Yeshivah of Flatbush High School. He holds a BA, MA and Semicha from YU / RIETS.
- Rabbi Dr. Gidon Rothstein a Rosh Kollel, published author, and Community Rabbi; he holds rabbinical ordination from Yeshiva University and a Ph.D. in Midrash from Harvard University.
- Rabbi Shlomo Katz, a well known singer, former chaplain (of Cedars Sinai Hospital), and currently Rabbi of the Shirat David synagogue and learning center in Efrat, Israel. He received his rabbinical ordination from Rabbi Zalman Nechemia Goldberg and from Rabbi Chaim Brovender.
