= Lindenbaum =

Lindenbaum is a surname, meaning Tilia in German; the nearest British tree name is Lime tree. It may refer to:

- Belda Lindenbaum, Jewish philanthropist and feminist
- Adolf Lindenbaum, Polish mathematician
  - Lindenbaum's lemma
  - Lindenbaum–Tarski algebra
- John Lindenbaum, musician
- Der Lindenbaum - one of the most well-known of Schubert's songs, from the song-cycle Winterreise.
- Alfred Lindon, born Alfred Lindenbaum (c.1868 - 1948), businessman and art collector
- Shirley Lindenbaum, Australian anthropologist

== See also ==
- Midreshet Lindenbaum, an institution of higher Torah learning for women in Israel
