= Jeffrey Saks =

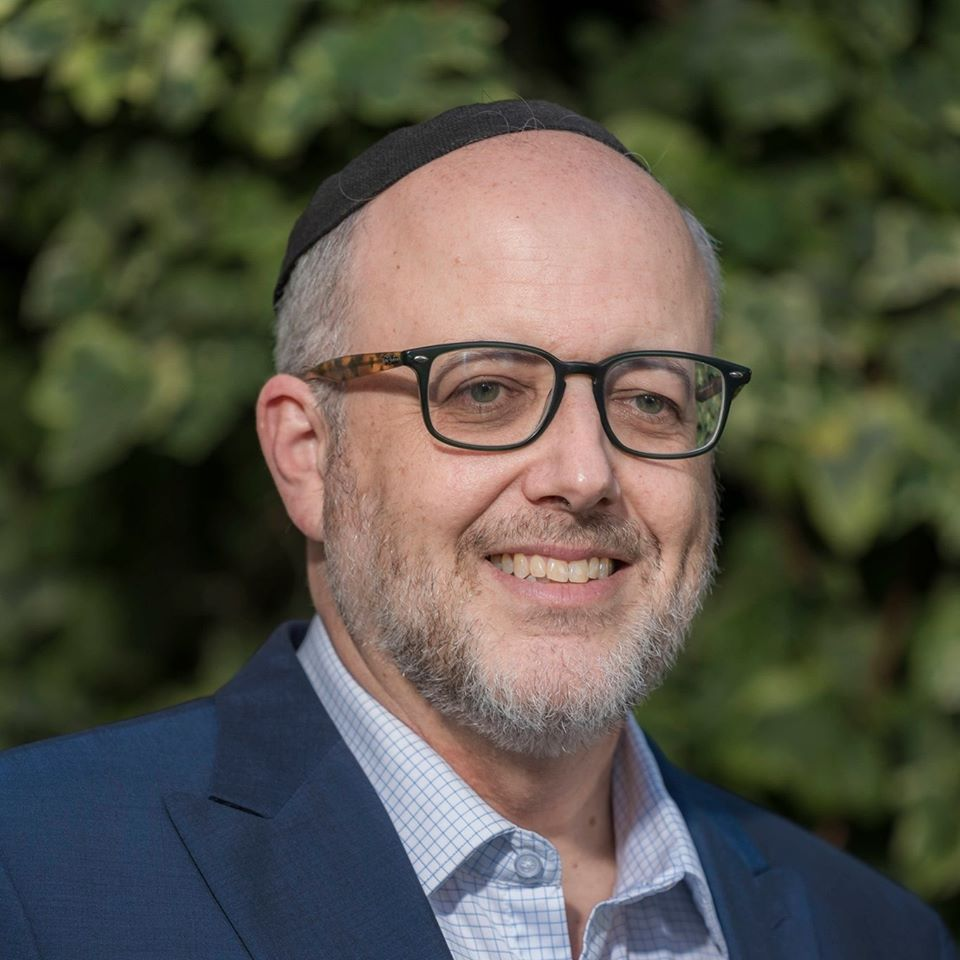
Jeffrey Saks

Jeffrey Saks (born March 25, 1969) is a Modern Orthodox rabbi, educator, writer and editor. Saks has published widely on Jewish thought, education, and literature. Born into a secular Jewish family and raised in suburban New Jersey, Saks became interested in religious observance in high school through the influence of a local rabbi and the NCSY youth movement.

== Education ==
Upon graduating from public school he enrolled at Yeshiva University in New York, spending his sophomore year studying abroad at Yeshivat Hamivtar in Efrat, Israel. He completed a B.A. in political science and continued for an M.A. at Yeshiva's Bernard Revel Graduate School, studying medieval Jewish history under Prof. David Berger. While at Revel he was part of the student leadership instrumental in rescuing the graduate school from threatened closure in 1992. He completed his Rabbinic ordination at Yeshiva in 1994.

== Career ==
In the United States Saks spent two years on the faculty of the Yeshiva University High School for Girls ("Central"), in Queens, NY, teaching A.P. Jewish history, Talmud, and Bible in 1992–94. He also occupied various leadership positions in the NCSY youth movement, serving as the director of its Israel Summer Kollel (1992–96).

In 1994 he left the United States and answered the call of Rabbi Chaim Brovender and Shlomo Riskin to serve as the administrator of Yeshivat Hamivtar in Efrat, Israel.

In 1997 he was awarded a two-year fellowship at the Mandel School for Educational Leadership in Jerusalem, where he pursued research in the philosophy of Jewish education, remaining as an adjunct faculty of the Mandel Foundation's Visions of Jewish Education Project. Saks has taught classes in Jewish thought and the works of Shai Agnon since around 2017 at the American Seminary for girls, Amudim. He is a consulting editor for digital platform The Lehrhaus and editorial board member of the Tel Aviv Review of Books. He was formerly on the teaching faculties of Yeshivat Ohr Yerushalayim, Machon Gold, and currently teaches at Midreshet Amudim. Jeffrey Saks lives in Efrat, Israel, with his wife Ilana Goldstein Saks and their four children.

== ATID/WebYeshiva ==
In 1999, with Rabbi Chaim Brovender, Saks created ATID – The Academy for Torah Initiatives and Directions in Jewish Education, a center for training Modern Orthodox educators in Israel and the United States and research institute. (“Atid” is Hebrew for future.) In 2007 ATID launched WebYeshiva.org, the world's first fully interactive online yeshiva with students from the entire world.

== S. Y. Agnon ==
Saks is considered one of the leading experts in the world on the writing of Hebrew literature's only Nobel laureate, S.Y. Agnon, and serves as the Director of Research at the Agnon House in Jerusalem. Between 2013 and 2019 he was the Series Editor of the S.Y. Agnon Library at the Toby Press, publishing a 15-volume series of Agnon's writings in annotated English translation. 8 The series was singled out for praise in reviews in The New Yorker and The New York Review of Books, where literary critic Robert Alter wrote, “Jeffrey Saks has undertaken a heroic task in assembling the Agnon Library.”

== Tradition Journal ==
In January 2019 Saks was named the sixth editor in chief of Tradition: A Journal of Orthodox Jewish Thought, published by the Rabbinical Council of America. Tradition was founded in 1958 by Rabbi Norman Lamm as the leading journal of intellectual Orthodox thought, and Saks has aimed to create a greater digital presence for the journal in addition to its quarterly print issues.
