= Shaul Magid =

American rabbi and theologian

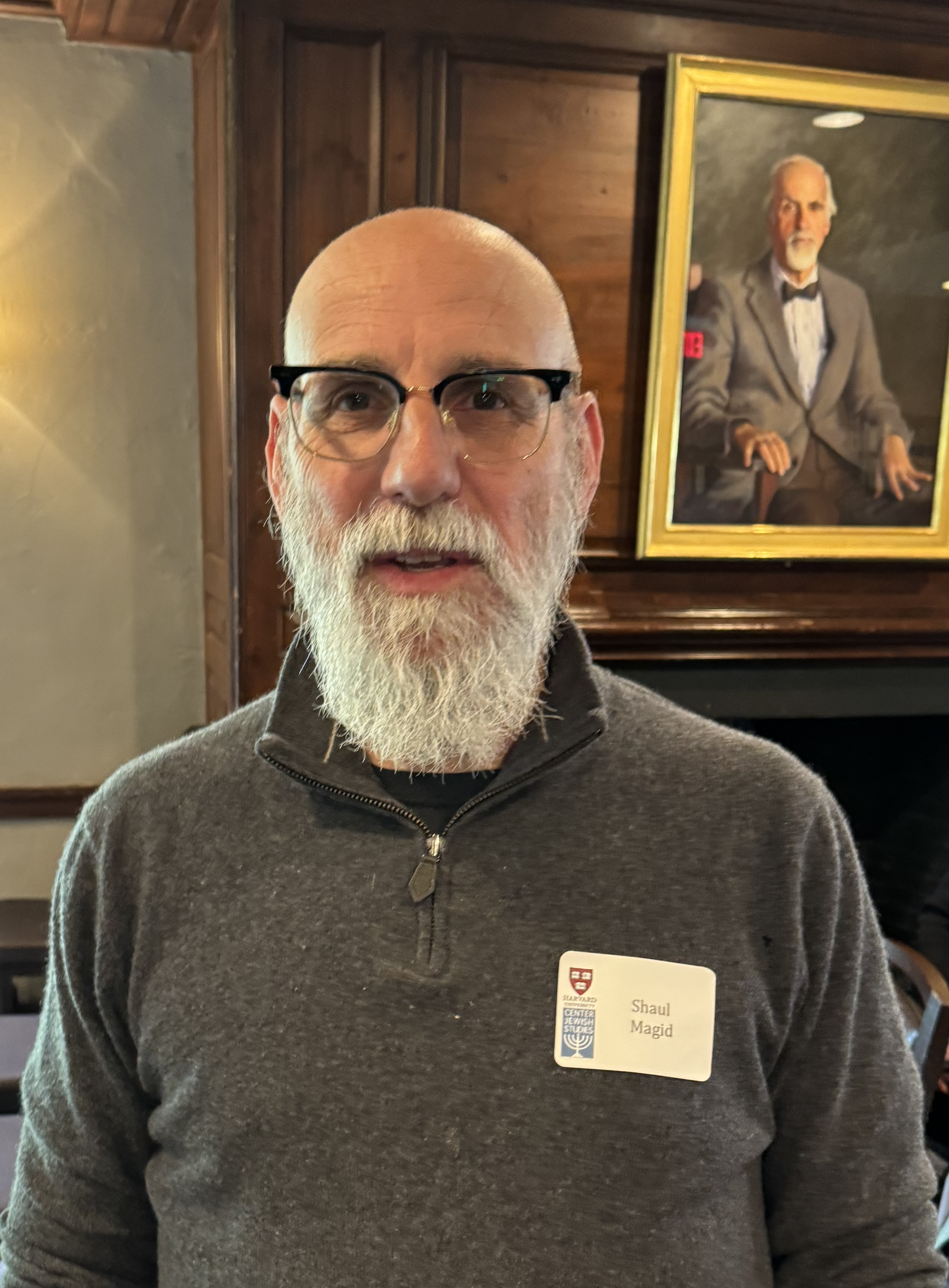
- Shaul Magid at the "Jews and Black Theory" conference, Harvard Faculty Club, May 2024
- Born: June 16, 1958 (age 68)

Academic background
- Education: Goddard College, Hebrew University, Brandeis University

Academic work
- Sub-discipline: Jewish Studies
- Institutions: Rice University, Jewish Theological Seminary, Indiana University, Dartmouth College
- Website: https://cswr.hds.harvard.edu/people/shaul-magid

Shaul Magid (Hebrew: שאול מגיד; born June 16, 1958) is a rabbi, Visiting Professor of Modern Jewish Studies at Harvard Divinity School, and Distinguished Fellow in Jewish Studies at Dartmouth College. From 2004 to 2018, he was a professor of religious studies and the Jay and Jeannie Schottenstein Chair of Jewish Studies in Modern Judaism at Indiana University as well as a senior research fellow at the Shalom Hartman Institute. From 1996 to 2004, he was a professor of Jewish philosophy at the Jewish Theological Seminary of America; he chaired the Department of Jewish Philosophy from 2000 to 2004.

== Education ==
Magid received his B.A. from Goddard College. He received his semicha (rabbinical ordination) in Jerusalem in 1984 from Rabbis Chaim Brovender, Yaacov Warhaftig, and Zalman Nechemia Goldberg. He became a candidate Fellow at the Shalom Hartman Institute and a graduate student in Medieval and Modern Jewish Thought at Hebrew University, where he completed his MA in 1989. He obtained his Ph.D. in Jewish thought from Brandeis University in 1994.

== Career ==
Magid served as a visiting professor at University of Massachusetts Amherst, Clark University, and Boston University. He was the Anna Smith Fine Chair in Jewish Thought at Rice University from 1994 to 1996 and then joined the faculty of the Jewish Theological Seminary of America before leaving for Indiana University. In 2023-24, Magid was a Visiting Professor of Modern Jewish Studies at the Harvard Divinity School.

Major research grants include a 2015-16 research fellowship at the Katz Center for Advanced Judaic Studies at the University of Pennsylvania and 2017-18 National Endowment for the Humanities Senior Fellowship at the Center for Jewish History for a book project on "American Jewish Survivalism: Meir Kahane and the Politics of Pride." He is an elected member of the American Academy of Jewish Research.

Magid has served as the rabbi of the Fire Island Synagogue since 1997. He is a former contributing editor at Tablet Magazine and was the editor of Jewish Thought and Culture for Tikkun magazine.

From Metaphysics to Midrash received the 2008 American Academy of Religion Award for best book in religion in the textual studies category. Magid is the editor of God's Voice from the Void: Old and New Essays on Rabbi Nahman of Bratslav (SUNY Press, 2001) and co-editor of Beginning Again: Toward a Hermeneutic of Jewish Texts (Seven Bridges Press, 2002).

In his 2023 book The Necessity of Exile, Magid rethinks the role of Zionism in Jewish identity, recenters Judaism over nationalism, and calls for a return to religion to keep Jews together. Referencing Eugene Borowitz, he writes: "Anybody who cares seriously about being a Jew is in Exile and would be in Exile even if that person were in Jerusalem."

In May 2024, Magid and Terrence L. Johnson co-convened the academic conference "Jews and Black Theory: Conceptualizing Otherness in the Twenty-First Century". Magid gave opening remarks and chaired a session titled "Blackness, Whiteness, and Double Consciousness".

== Bibliography ==
- Hasidism on the Margin: Reconciliation, Antinomianism, and Messianism in Izbica and Radzin Hasidism (University of Wisconsin Press, 2003) ISBN 9780299192747
- From Metaphysics to Midrash: Myth, History, and the Interpretation of Scripture in Lurianic Kabbala (Bloomington, IN: Indiana University Press, 2008) ISBN 9780253350886
- American Post-Judaism: Identity and Renewal in a Postethnic Society (Indiana University Press, 2013) ISBN 9780253008022
- Hasidism Incarnate: Hasidism, Christianity, and the Construction of Modern Judaism (Stanford University Press, 2014) ISBN 9780804791304
- Piety and Rebellion: Essays in Hasidism (Academic Studies Press, 2019) ISBN 9781618117519
- The Bible, the Talmud, and the New Testament: Elijah Zvi Soloveitchik's Commentary to the New Testament (University of Pennsylvania Press, 2019)
- Meir Kahane: The Public Life and Political Thought of an American Jewish Radical (Princeton University Press, 2021) ISBN 9780691254692
- The Necessity of Exile: Essays from a Distance (Ayin Press, 2023) ISBN 9798986780313
- Jewish Anti-Zionism as Political Theology: The Major Writings of Rabbi Yoel Teitelbaum (University of California Press, 2026) ISBN 9780520428447

== Personal life ==
Magid grew up as a non-observant Jew in New York. At age 20, he became interested in learning more about Judaism. He became involved with the Haredi movement and studied Modern Orthodoxy, but after several years he "abandoned Orthodoxy more generally yet remained fascinated by, and deeply invested in, the complex nexus of Judaism and the American counter-culture". He is often quoted on such issues in the popular press; for instance, he recently discussed Jerry Garcia and the Grateful Dead in relation to Judaism, speaking from the perspective of "an ordained rabbi and a professor of Jewish and religious studies at Indiana University who was also present for the Dead’s legendary performance on the grounds of Raceway Park in Englishtown, New Jersey on Sept. 3, 1977."

Magid is married to Annette Yoshiko Reed, a Japanese-American convert to Judaism who teaches at Harvard Divinity School.

Magid's creative partner is Jewish musician Basya Schechter, with whom he released a 2024 album of Appalachian and Jewish music. Musica Judaica wrote in a review that Schechter and Magid set Kabbalat Shabbat texts to Appalachian old-time music, resulting in "a timeless, transcendent musical experience".
