= Carmy =

Carmy may refer to:

- Shalom Carmy (born 1946), American rabbi
- Carmy Berzatto, fictional character from the TV series The Bear
