= Katz Yeshiva High School =

Location
- 20900 Ruth and Baron Coleman Blvd. Palm Beach County; Boca Raton, Florida 33428; United States; 26.36117°N 80.19700°W

Information
- Type: Jewish private
- Motto: "Engage, Challenge, and Inspire"
- Religious affiliations: Modern Orthodox Judaism, Zionism
- Founded: 1998
- Founder: Rabbi Kenneth Brander
- Status: Open
- School district: Palm Beach
- NCES School ID: A9901458
- Headmaster: Rabbi Avi Levitt
- Faculty: 52 FTEs
- Grades: 9–12
- Age range: 14–18
- Enrollment: 376 (as of 2019–20)
- Average class size: 14
- Student to teacher ratio: 7.2:1
- Hours in school day: 8 Twice a Week, 9 Twice a Week, 6 Once a Week
- Colors: Navy, Orange, and White
- Song: Nigunim
- Athletics: 12 FHSAA Teams: Boys & Girls Varsity Soccer, Varsity Basketball Jr. Varsity Basketball, Varsity Tennis; Boys Varsity Volleyball, Girls Varsity Softball, Girls Varsity Volleyball, Boys Varsity Golf
- Nickname: KYHS
- Team name: Storm
- Newspaper: Yeshiva Highlites, Brainstorm, Ashreinu, Moed, Dimensions
- Communities served: Serves all of South Florida
- Feeder schools: Hillel Day School of Boca Raton, Brauser Maimonides Academy
- Alumni: 471
- Website: www.yeshivahs.org

Katz Yeshiva High School (KYHS) is a private Jewish high school yeshiva located in Boca Raton, Florida, in Palm Beach County. The school provides a Modern Orthodox education and has both male and female students in grades 9–12.

As of the 2019–20 school year, the school had an enrollment of 376 students and 52 classroom teachers (on an FTE basis), for a student–teacher ratio of 7.2:1. The school's student body was 97.9% (368) White, 1.3% (5) Hispanic, 0.5% (2) Asian and 0.3% (1) Black.

Students come from as far south as Miami and as far north as West Palm Beach. The school is located on the campus of the Jewish Federation of South Palm Beach County, having relocated there in 2017 from its original campus at the Boca Raton Synagogue, in nearby Boca Del Mar.

The school was founded by Rabbi Kenneth Brander.

== History ==
As early as 1993, Rabbi Kenneth Brander, then rabbi of the Boca Raton Synagogue, held discussions with the communal leadership of South Palm Beach County about the creation of the first yeshiva high school between North Miami Beach and Atlanta.

In 1996, he organized The Committee to Form a Yeshiva High School, and in 1997 it hired Rabbi Perry Tirschwell as its Head of School to create the school. Mrs. Ora Lee Kanner, who joined Rabbi Tirschwell before it opened, rose from Director of Judaic Studies to Assistant Principal to finally Principal, in 2008.

Mrs. Pam Turk, who was involved in the school from the beginning, was the school's founding president. The school opened its doors to forty-one 9th and 10th graders in September 1998, and has grown quickly in its short history. The school graduated its first class in June 2001. The school was named in loving memory of Jack and Bessie Weinbaum in 2003. The school was originally located in the Jacobs and Rubin Youth and Senior Center of the Boca Raton Synagogue in suburban, central Boca Raton. The center is named for Dr. Merv and Elaine Jacobs and Mr. Lenny and Sima Rubin who both were part of the founders of the Boca Raton Synagogue and instrumental in the early years of its existence. In the summer of 2004, the school more than doubled its space, and Dr. Sam Lasko assumed the presidency of the school. In 2010, Mr. Jeff Harris assumed the presidency.

In June 2012, Rabbi Tirschwell stepped down after 15 years at the helm of the school. Executive Director Shimmie Kaminetsky and Principal Mrs. Ora Lee Kanner oversaw operations at the school during the 2012–2013 transition year, as the school was in the midst of a search process for a new Head of School, which began in 2013. On February 20, 2013, the Board of Trustees announced that it had selected S.A.R. Associate Principal Rabbi Jonathan Kroll as Head of School. The announcement came after a rigorous vetting process undertaken by the newly formed search committee.

In 2015, the school was renamed Yeshiva High School, and construction began on its new campus at the Jewish Federation of South Palm Beach County. It was later renamed Katz Yeshiva High School. The school officially opened at its new campus and building in August 2017.

== Curriculum ==
The school year is separated into three trimesters, including both religious and secular instruction.

Single-sex religious classes ("Judaic Studies") are held in the morning and include Chumash (Bible), Navi (Prophets), Torah She Ba'al Peh (Oral Law), and Hebrew. College preparatory subjects ("General or Secular Studies") are taught in mixed-sex classes in the afternoon and are separated by level. Core classes include English, science, math, and history, and Jewish History with electives such as Spanish, Arabic, Sign Language, Business, Photography, Videography, art, graphic design.

The school offers various Advanced Placement classes, including AP European History, AP United States History, AP English Literature, [[]]AP English Language and Composition, AP Chemistry, AP Biology, AP Physics, AP Environmental Science, AP Studio Art, AP Statistics, AP Psychology, AP Human Geography and AP Calculus AB and BC. Many students also participate in Yeshiva University's Model United Nations.

== Athletics ==
The school hosts a range of athletics separated by gender, including varsity boys and girls basketball, boys and girls soccer, boys and girls tennis, boys baseball, girls volleyball, and boys golf, boys flag football and junior varsity boys and girls basketball. These teams compete in the Florida High School Athletic Association (FHSAA) state league.

The sports teams are known as the Yeshiva Storm.

== Community service requirements ==
Students must complete 7 hours of community service each trimester, totaling 21 hours by the end of the school year and 84 hours by the end of the students' high school tenures.
