= Yeshiva University Center for the Jewish Future =

The Center for the Jewish Future is a non-profit center at Yeshiva University.

== Overview ==
It consists of six divisions:

CJF Summer Program - Counterpoint Israel 2009

- The Max Stern Division of Communal Services (at the Rabbi Isaac Elchanan Theological Seminary) offers continuing education for rabbis, rebbetzins, and educators under the age of 40, as well as lay leaders.
- The Gertrude and Morris Bienenfeld Department of Rabbinic Services (Max Stern Division of Communal Services/Rabbi Isaac Elchanan Theological Seminary) provides training and placement services for rabbis and educators.
- The Community Initiative Division promotes education programming, outreach, dialogue, and tikkun olam.
- The Association of Modern Orthodox Day Schools provides educational services, advocates for member schools, and interfaces on their behalf with Yeshiva University faculty and students.
- The Leadership Training Division runs a number of programs including Quest (Quality Education Skills Training) that helps undergraduate students become more effective participants and leaders in Jewish Communal organizations. The Eimatai Leadership Development Project coordinates leadership training seminars for high school students across North America to focus on Social Action and Social Justice through a Jewish lens.
- The Research Division focuses on practical solutions to challenges such as infertility and organ donation. The division also includes the Torah U-Madda Project (including the Orthodox Forum, the Torah U-Madda Journal, and Ten Da’at: A Journal of Jewish Education) and hosts several independent organizations, including the Organization for the Resolution of Agunot (helping to prevent agunot or abandoned wives) and the Orthodox Caucus.

Rabbi Yaakov Glasser is dean of the Center for the Jewish Future. He succeeds Rabbi Kenneth Brander who was the inaugural dean of the CJF for nine years.
