= Kenneth Brander =

American Modern Orthodox rabbi

Rabbi Dr. Kenneth Brander קנת ברנדר
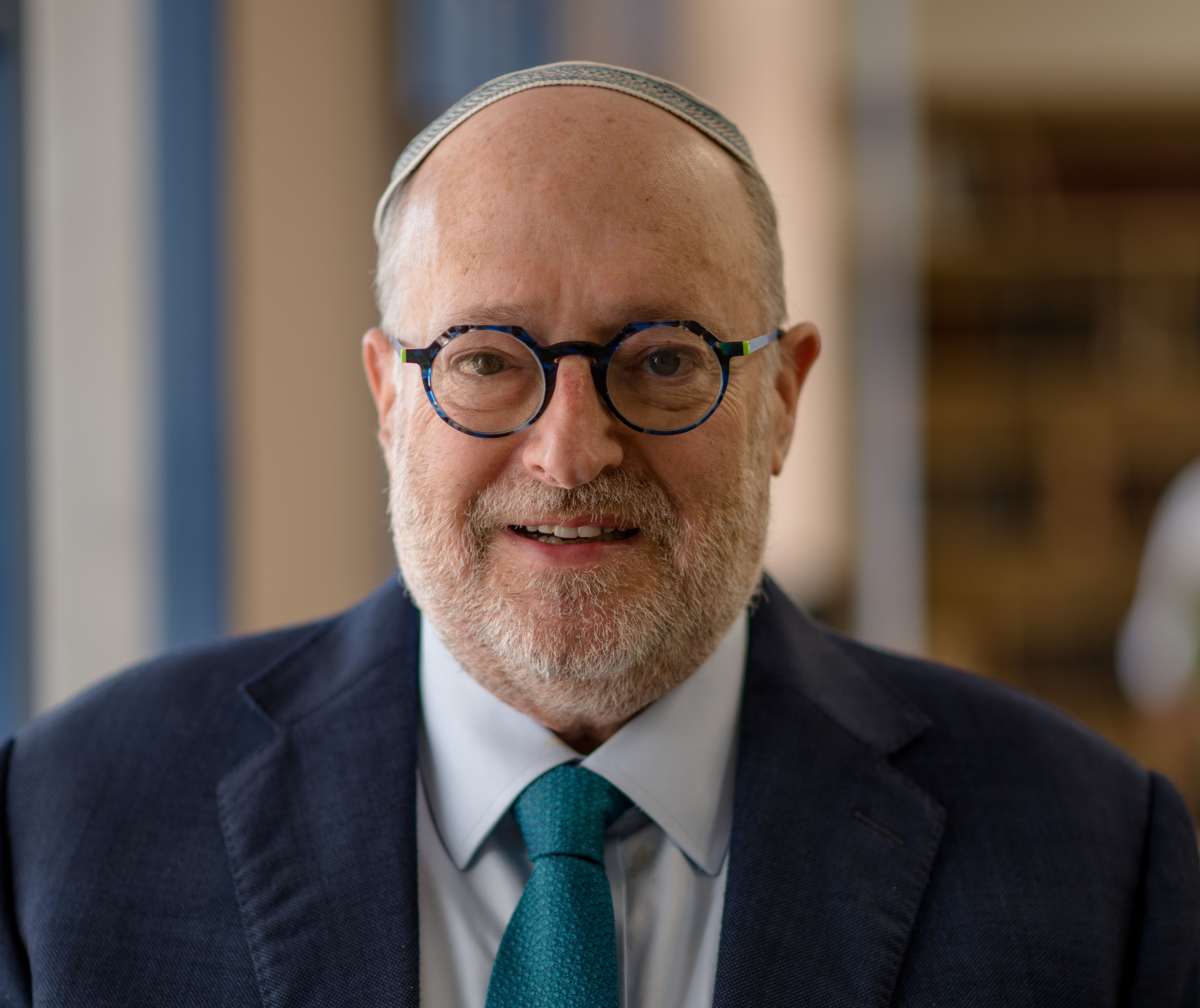
- Brander in 2025

Personal life
- Born: 18 April 1962 (age 64)
- Education: Yeshiva College

Religious life
- Religion: Judaism

Jewish leader
- Predecessor: Rabbi Shlomo Riskin
- Position: President and Rosh HaYeshiva
- Organisation: Ohr Torah Stone
- Semikhah: Rabbi Isaac Elchanan Theological Seminary

Kenneth Brander (Hebrew: קנת ברנדר; born April 18, 1962) is an Israeli-American Modern Orthodox rabbi who is President and Rosh HaYeshiva of the Ohr Torah Stone network of institutions.

== Early life and education ==
Brander grew up in Detroit, Michigan, and Queens, New York.

He is a 1984 alumnus of Yeshiva College (Yeshiva University) and received his ordination from the Rabbi Isaac Elchanan Theological Seminary (RIETS) in 1986. During that time he served as a student assistant to Rabbi Joseph B. Soloveitchik and as the editor for The Yeshiva University Haggada. Brander also received special ordination from the Puah Institute in Israel, and from the late Israeli Chief Rabbi Mordechai Eliyahu, in the fields of medical ethics, reproductive technology and halakha.

Brander has a PhD in general philosophy and comparative literature from Florida Atlantic University. His dissertation was titled "The Temple in Jerusalem Idealized and the Historic-Synagogue-Institution: A Study in Synagogue Purposes in an American Context."

== Career ==
From 1990 to 1991, Brander was the acting rabbi of New York City's Lincoln Square Synagogue, after having served as assistant rabbi from 1986 to 1990. From 1991 to 2005, Brander served as the senior rabbi of the Boca Raton Synagogue. During this time, the community grew from 60 to 600 families. While there, Brander founded the Katz Yeshiva High School, and studied Jewish law regarding reproductive technologies. He is now Rabbi Emeritus of Boca Raton Synagogue.

From 2005 to 2018, Brander served as Vice President for University and Community Life, as well as the inaugural David Mitzner Dean of Yeshiva University Center for the Jewish Future (CJF) at Yeshiva University (YU). He also taught rabbinic courses at the Rabbi Isaac Elchanan Theological Seminary (RIETS).

At YU, Brander worked to improve and expand the student experience, developing opportunities for students to engage with communities outside of the classroom, and restructuring the Graduate Program of Advanced Talmudic Studies for Women (GPATS).

In 2018, he was named President and Rosh HaYeshiva of Ohr Torah Stone, succeeding Rabbi Shlomo Riskin, who founded the organization in 1983.

== Personal life ==
Rabbi Brander moved to Israel in 2018. He and his wife have five children and several grandchildren.

== Works ==
- "Exploring the Biblical Prohibition on Selling land to Non-Jews Living in the Land of Israel and its Contemporary Relevance", V'Chai Imach [Hebrew], (Maggid Books: Expected publication date: Late 2025)
- "Finding a Home in our Midst: Engaging and Welcoming Gay and Lesbian Jews Within the Orthodox Community"
- "Fashioning Our Spiritual Garb", Mitokh Ha-Ohel, From Within the Tent: Essays on the weekly Haftarah Reading ed. Daniel Z. Feldman and Stuart W. Halpern (Maggid Books: Jerusalem, 2011), 451–456.
- "In the Eye of the Storm: Shabbat Observance During a Hurricane or Severe Weather Event", Journal of Halakha and Contemporary Society, LXIV (Fall 2012), 41–65.
- "Artificial Insemination and Surrogate Motherhood through the Prism of Jewish Law", B'Or Ha'Torah, XII, (2000), 59–65.
