= RBM =

RBM is a three-letter acronym. It refers to:

- 89.1 Radio Blue Mountains, Radio station in Katoomba, New South Wales
- Restricted Boltzmann machine, a type of neural network used in artificial intelligence applications
- Rust Belt Music, a San Franciscan band
- Rani Bilashmoni Govt. Boys' High School
- Réseau des Bains de Mer a group of metre gauge railways centred on Noyelles-sur-Mer in France
- Racing Bart Mampaey, a racing team competing in the World Touring Car Championship, running the BMW Team RBM operation
- Richards Bay Minerals, a South African mining company
- Reflected Brownian motion, a class of stochastic process
- Rating and Billing Manager, Business support system (billing) solution
- Results-based management (RBM) is a management strategy which uses feedback loops to achieve strategic goals.
- Straubing Wallmühle Airport in Germany
