= Yeshivat HaMivtar =

Yeshiva in Efrat

Coordinates: 31.6466°N 35.1434°E

Yeshivat Torat Yosef - Hamivtar (ישיבת תורת יוסף - המבתר) was a men's yeshiva located in Efrat in the West Bank. The Roshei Yeshiva are Rabbi Yonatan Rosensweig and Rabbi Shlomo Riskin. The institution is primarily focused on post college-aged students and is part of the Ohr Torah Stone educational institutions founded by Rabbi Shlomo Riskin and Rabbi Chaim Brovender.

Yeshivat Hamivtar is closely associated with the Modern Orthodox and Religious Zionist/Dati Leumi schools of contemporary Orthodox Judaism. The Yeshiva emphasizes teaching its students how to become more independent learners, especially in Talmud. It caters to both students with strong religious backgrounds, and students adopting a more observant lifestyle. It is located just outside the southern gate of Efrat, between the city and the Kibbutz Migdal Oz - located in a campus called Kiryat Shoshana.

== Programs ==
The institution has a non-rabbinical and rabbinical track. Students who do not opt for the rabbinical track often enter other Yeshivot or the workforce in Israel or other countries.

=== Rabbinical/Semicha Program ===
Students accepted into the Semicha program (ordination) are required to spend three-years studying Halacha in the afternoon seder, in addition to the morning seder of Gemara with the rest of the Yeshiva. The three years' study consists of: Shabbat, Nidah, and Issur v'Heter. Other classes in the track include Hashkafa (questions relating to "worldview") and Practical Rabbinics; a mandatory beki'ut (survey / overview) program in Talmud was instituted beginning with the 2008-2009 year.

=== Yeshiva Program ===
The Yeshiva program, for students not focused on Semicha, has a wide array of classes. A seder of Talmud in the morning, followed in the afternoon by Halacha (Jewish law), Machshava (Jewish philosophy), Navi, and Chumash. The curriculum is designed to produce well rounded graduates, capable of learning on their own in the original text. Some students may start out in the Yeshiva program and progress into the Semicha program.

== History ==
Rabbi Chaim Brovender founded Yeshivat Hamivtar in Givat HaMivtar in 1967 as a spinoff of Yeshivas Itri. The goal of the institution was to create a unique learning center with a dual emphasis on intellectual openness and the systematic teaching of Talmud and other texts. Brovender had been teaching at Darche Noam and left with ten-students to found the new Yeshiva including Rabbi David Fink and Professor Charles Manekin. Shortly thereafter Rabbi Brovender also founded Michlelet Bruria as a parallel program for women. It was one of the first Orthodox institutions to teach Talmud to women. Today the institution is known as Midreshet Lindenbaum.

In 1985, Yeshivat Hamivtar became part of the network of educational institutions founded by Riskin called Ohr Torah Stone. At which point Rabbi Riskin became co-Rosh Yeshiva. Rabbi Shuki Reich led the program to train advanced students for Rabbinic Ordination.

Yeshiva Hamivtar previously offered a post-high school "gap program"; in 2001 this was discontinued, allowing the Yeshiva to focus on the needs of the post-college students. Ohr Torah that same year created Yeshivat Torat Shraga which became its post high school program, led by Rabbis Brovender and Ebner. Rabbi Brovender then returned fully to Yeshivat Hamivtar.

In 1997 The Yeshiva changed its name to Yeshivat Hamivtar-Orot Lev.

In early 2007, Brovender left the yeshiva to focus on developing his organization for Jewish educational initiatives, Atid, and especially its latest project called WebYeshiva.

Rabbi Joel Zeff succeeded Brovender as Rosh Yeshiva. During Zeff's three-year tenure educational and administrative changes were made that brought considerable expansion of the Yeshiva's enrollment and vibrancy.

In Elul 2010 Rabbi Yonatan Rosensweig became the new Rosh Yeshiva. The name of the yeshivah changed again, this time to Yeshivat Torat Yosef-Hamivatar. The new leadership of the yeshiva is especially intent on actualizing the institution's great potential to serve the many students desirous of a serious yeshiva experience in a Modern Orthodox-Religious Zionist environment, as well as committed to Riskin's dream of creating truly Modern Orthodox rabbis. In 2012 the program closed. Its former campus now houses the Machanaim Hesder Yeshiva of Ohr Torah Stone.

== Notable alumni ==
- Rabbi Dr. David Fink, Israeli Orthodox rabbi and expert in halacha and Jewish medical ethics
- Dore Gold, Israeli diplomat
- Rabbi Prof. Daniel Reiser of Herzog College
- Dr. Hillel Maresky of Tel Aviv University
- Rabbi Prof. Shaul Magid of Dartmouth College
- Rabbi Jeffrey Saks, founder of Atid and director of WebYeshiva. Head of research at the Agnon House
- Rabbi Hanan Schlesinger, cofounder and Director of International Relations of the Roots/Shorashim/Judur organization for Israeli-Palestinian dialogue

== See also ==
- Gush Etzion
- Hesder
- Torah study
- Orthodox Judaism outreach
- Baal teshuva
- Jewish fundamentalism
