= Jonah Rank =

Rabbi educator and musician

Jonah Rank (born 1987) is the rosh yeshiva and President of the Hebrew Seminary -- a Rabbinical School for the Deaf and Hearing. Rank is an American Conservative Rabbi, educator, musician, and writer.

== Educational and professional background ==
Rank was ordained as a rabbi at the Jewish Theological Seminary (2015), where he also earned a master's degree in Jewish Thought. He attended Columbia University's joint program with JTS for his undergraduate education, where he studied music.

In the summers of 2010–2013, Rank worked as a Community Educator at BIMA at Brandeis University. He has taught Hebrew and Rabbinics at the Solomon Schechter of Manhattan. Between 2016 and 2019, he served as maskil at Shaar Shalom Synagogue in Halifax Nova Scotia. Beginning in 2019, Rank directs the Shul School at Kehilat HaNahar in New Hope, PA.

== Writings and creative work ==
Rank is the managing editor of Zeramim: An Online Journal of Applied Jewish Thought. Rank served as secretary for Mahzor Lev Shalem (New York, NY: Rabbinical Assembly 2010) and Siddur Lev Shalem (New York, NY: Rabbinical Assembly 2015). Rank's writings have appeared in Conservative Judaism, Shma, Jewschool, Zeramim, the Journal of Synagogue Music and is a regular contributing writer to general publications, such as JTA and the Times of Israel. An advocate for gender egalitarianism, Rank has created resources to promote egalitarianism within Jewish liturgy, including a gender-neutral conversion certificate as well as a gender-neutral ketubbah with an accompanying essay and a forthcoming feminine-language siddur (prayer book). He has edited and contributed to an original, liturgical composition for the Hebrew in Harmony series.

A multi-instrumentalist, Rank is also a composer. His music includes both original settings to traditional Jewish liturgy and musical comedy. Notable musical collaborations include Rank's work with Ghanaian rapper Osekre and his musical accompaniment to dancers Phillip Askew and Lydia Walker. Rank co-founded and co-directed Jewish Eyes on the Arts.

== Discography ==
- Loud and Dumb (2006)
- Your Favorite Album (2007)
- Bootlegs I: Songs for Toddlers on the Human Condition (2011)
- I'm Quitting the Music Business (2011)
