= Chaim Brovender =

American rabbi

Rabbi Chaim Brovender חיים ברובנדר

Personal life
- Born: 1941 (age 84–85)
- Occupation: rabbi

Religious life
- Religion: Judaism

Jewish leader
- Position: Rosh Yeshiva
- Yeshiva: Web Yeshiva
- Residence: Jerusalem, Israel

Chaim Brovender (Hebrew: חיים ברובנדר; born 1941) is an Israeli Modern Orthodox and Religious Zionist rabbi.

== Biography ==
Brovender was born in 1941 in Brooklyn, New York. He attended Yeshivah of Flatbush, a coeducational Modern Orthodox day school. He later graduated from Yeshiva University with a BA in mathematics and rabbinical ordination from Rabbi Joseph B. Soloveitchik.

In 1965, he and his wife moved to Jerusalem, Israel. Until 1967, he studied in the Kollel of Yeshivas Itri (the Israel Torah Research Institute) under Rabbi Mordechai Elefant. In 1974, Brovender completed a doctorate in Semitic languages from Hebrew University.

In 1967, on the advice of Rabbi Menachem M. Schneerson, Brovender founded Hartman College in Romema, Jerusalem (under the aegis of the Israel Torah Research Institute). Its purpose was to serve as a yeshiva for American students who wanted to study in Israel.

In 1976, Rabbi Brovender founded Yeshivat HaMivtar in French Hill, Jerusalem. That same year, Brovender established Midreshet Lindenbaum, originally named Michlelet Bruria, as the women's component of Yeshivat Hamivtar. Brovender successfully ran Yeshivat HaMivtar alone until 1985, when he merged it with the network of educational institutions founded by Rabbi Shlomo Riskin called Ohr Torah Stone.

In 2007, Rabbi Brovender launched WebYeshiva.org, the first live and fully interactive online yeshiva.

Rabbi Brovender served as a Rav Tzavai (army rabbi) for more than 20 years.

== 2000 beating incident ==
In October 2000, Brovender was beaten by Palestinian police and protesters. At the time, he was the head of the Yeshivat Hamivtar yeshiva in the Israeli settlement of Efrat, and was driving from the yeshiva to his home in Jerusalem when he drove past a Palestinian village to bypass a road closed by recent unrest, and was pulled over by Palestinian police. Palestinian security forces managed to extract him from the scene after about an hour and hand him over to Israeli troops. His vehicle was destroyed by a Palestinian mob.
