= Douglas Goldhamer =

American rabbi (1945–2022)

Douglas Goldhamer (May 1, 1945 – February 3, 2022) was an American rabbi who was president of the Hebrew Seminary, a rabbinic school for the deaf and hearing, and Senior Rabbi of Congregation Bene Shalom in Skokie, Illinois. It is the first and only rabbinic school for the deaf in the world.

Following his rabbinic ordination at Hebrew Union College, Goldhamer, together with Chicago deaf leaders, established Congregation Bene Shalom/Hebrew Association of the Deaf in 1972. For the subsequent 43 years, he served as Senior Rabbi, working with the deaf and hearing Jewish communities.

In 1992, Goldhamer founded Hebrew Seminary, where he served as president and Professor of Jewish Mysticism, as well as other topics of the rabbinic curriculum. He lectured on philosophy, Jewish mysticism and prayer throughout the United States.

Goldhamer was a Scholar in Residence and Professor of Philosophy at Gallaudet University, Washington, D.C., the only university for the deaf in the world. In 1998, Goldhamer received his Doctor of Divinity degree from Hebrew Union College in Cincinnati. He also held a PhD in Medieval Philosophy from the University of Chicago. Goldhamer was a member of the Chicago Board of Rabbis, Chicago Association of Reform Rabbis, and the Central Conference of American Rabbis.

Goldhamer was the author of two books: Healing With God's Love: Kabbalah's Hidden Secrets, which contains ancient Kabbalistic practices whose translations were not heretofore available to the public, and This is For Everyone: Universal Principles of Healing Prayer and the Jewish Mystics.

Goldhamer began painting during his final two decades. He focused on Jewish mystical and Biblical themes. His artwork has been shown in galleries nationally.

The Jewish Daily Forward reported that Goldhamer died after a brief illness, on February 3, 2022, at the age of 76.
