= The Lonelyhearts =

American band

The Lonelyhearts is a Fort Collins, Colorado and Iowa City, Iowa-based band featuring John Lindenbaum (vocals, guitar) and Andre Perry (vocals, keyboards). The group has toured the United States and is frequently reviewed in the alternative press. Recent reviews have compared the band to Neil Young, The Kingsbury Manx and Unbunny.

In addition to performing as The Lonelyhearts, Lindenbaum regularly performs solo acoustic sets, and both Lindenbaum and Perry are also members of the band Rust Belt Music.

== Discography ==
- Make Yourself At Home (2004)
- Dispatch (2005)
- The Christmas Day EP (2005) (John Lindenbaum solo EP)
- The Four-Wheel Drive E.P. (2008) Three Ring Records
- Disaster Footage at Night (2008) Three Ring Records
- Harlequin Bands (Single) (2008) Three Ring Records
- Years in the Great Interior (2013) Maximum Ames Records
- Age of Man (2016) Maximum Ames Records
