= Walter Wurzburger =

Rabbi Walter S. Wurzburger, originally Würzburger, (1920 - April 16, 2002), a leader of Modern Orthodox Judaism and student of Rabbi Joseph B. Soloveitchik, was born in Munich in March 1920 and emigrated to America in 1938.

He was Adjunct Professor of Philosophy at Yeshiva University, and headed both the Rabbinical Council of America and the Synagogue Council of America during his career. He received the National Rabbinic Leadership Award and the Samuel Belkin Literary Award. Rabbi Wurzburger is the author of Ethics of Responsibility: Pluralistic Approaches to Covenantal Ethics, God is Proof Enough, and co-editor of A Treasury of Tradition.

Rabbi Walter Wurzburger studied at Yeshiva Torah Vodaath, Yeshiva College and Rabbi Isaac Elchanan Theological Seminary, and received a PhD from Harvard on the philosophy of Brentano.

He served as rabbi of Shaarei Shomayim Congregation in Toronto from 1953 to 1966 and subsequently at Congregation Shaaray Tefila in Lawrence, New York from 1967 until 1994. Wurzburger continued at Congregation Shaaray Tefila as Rabbi Emeritus and continued to reside in Lawrence until his death on April 16, 2002 (Iyyar 4).

== Bibliography ==
- A Tiny but Articulate Minority- The Thought of Rabbi Walter Wurzbuger by Alan Brill Tradition 41:2 (2008)
