= Hebrew Seminary =

Non-denominational rabbinical school

Coordinates: 42.0261°N 87.7393°W

Hebrew Seminary (stylized as Hebrew Seminary – A Rabbinical School for Deaf & Hearing) is a non-denominational, online only, rabbinical school in Ravenswood, Chicago, Illinois, which trains both deaf and hearing students. Founded in 1992 by Rabbi Douglas Goldhamer as the first Rabbinic school for the deaf, Hebrew Seminary's stated aim is to train individuals as rabbis and Jewish educators to serve all Jewish communities, including the deaf community. The school considers itself an inclusive and egalitarian community for the study and practice of Judaism, ordaining women, men, and openly LGBT people.

Hebrew Seminary's ordination program spans 5 years. According to the school, the objective of this course is to teach students to be scholars, educators, and leaders, as well as spiritual guides "who can hear and share the voice of God with members of their communities". It encourages commitment to traditional scholarship, such as the Talmud and Bible, as well as the spiritual discipline of Kabbalah with meditative practices, the incorporation of which is viewed as a distinctive aspect of the rabbinic curriculum. Graduation requires all students, whether hearing or deaf, to attain fluency in American Sign Language, completion of a thesis, and an exam.

Hebrew Seminary in 2023 launched a two-year para-rabbinic program for "Jews who want to serve as community leaders but can’t commit to five years in rabbinical school". The program incorporates Torah study with ritual and pastoral training. The graduates may also fill a need for small communities that can’t afford a rabbi but still want a religious and pastoral leader.

As of 2025 the President and rosh yeshiva of Hebrew Seminary is Rabbi Jonah Rank.

== See also ==
- List of rabbinical schools § Non-denominational
- Rabbi § Seminaries unaffiliated with main denominations
- Semikhah (Rabbinic Ordination)
- Yeshiva
