= Belda Kaufman Lindenbaum =

- Born: September 5, 1938; New York City
- Died: May 12, 2015 (aged 76); New York City
- Spouse: Marcel Lindenbaum

Belda Kaufman Lindenbaum (September 5, 1938 – May 12, 2015) was an Open Orthodox American Jewish philanthropist and activist, who co-founded Midreshet Lindenbaum and served as a founding board member of Yeshivat Maharat.

== Background ==
Lindenbaum, her husband Marcel, and Shlomo Riskin co-founded Midreshet Lindenbaum, a post high school institute in Israel for students which combines service in the Israeli Defense Forces with religious studies. She served as a founding board member of Yeshivat Maharat, on the Board of Directors of Yeshivat Chovevei Torah, a board member of Yeshiva University, President of the American Friends of Bar-Ilan University, a board member of Ramaz Day School, a past president of the Drisha Institute of Jewish Education, and Vice President of the Jewish Orthodox Feminist Alliance. In 2016, through an endowed gift, Lindenbaum created the Machon Siach Center at SAR High School.

Lindenbaum died from brain cancer in May 2015.
