= Shalom Carmy =

American rabbi, theologian, and academic (born 1949)

Rabbi Shalom Carmy
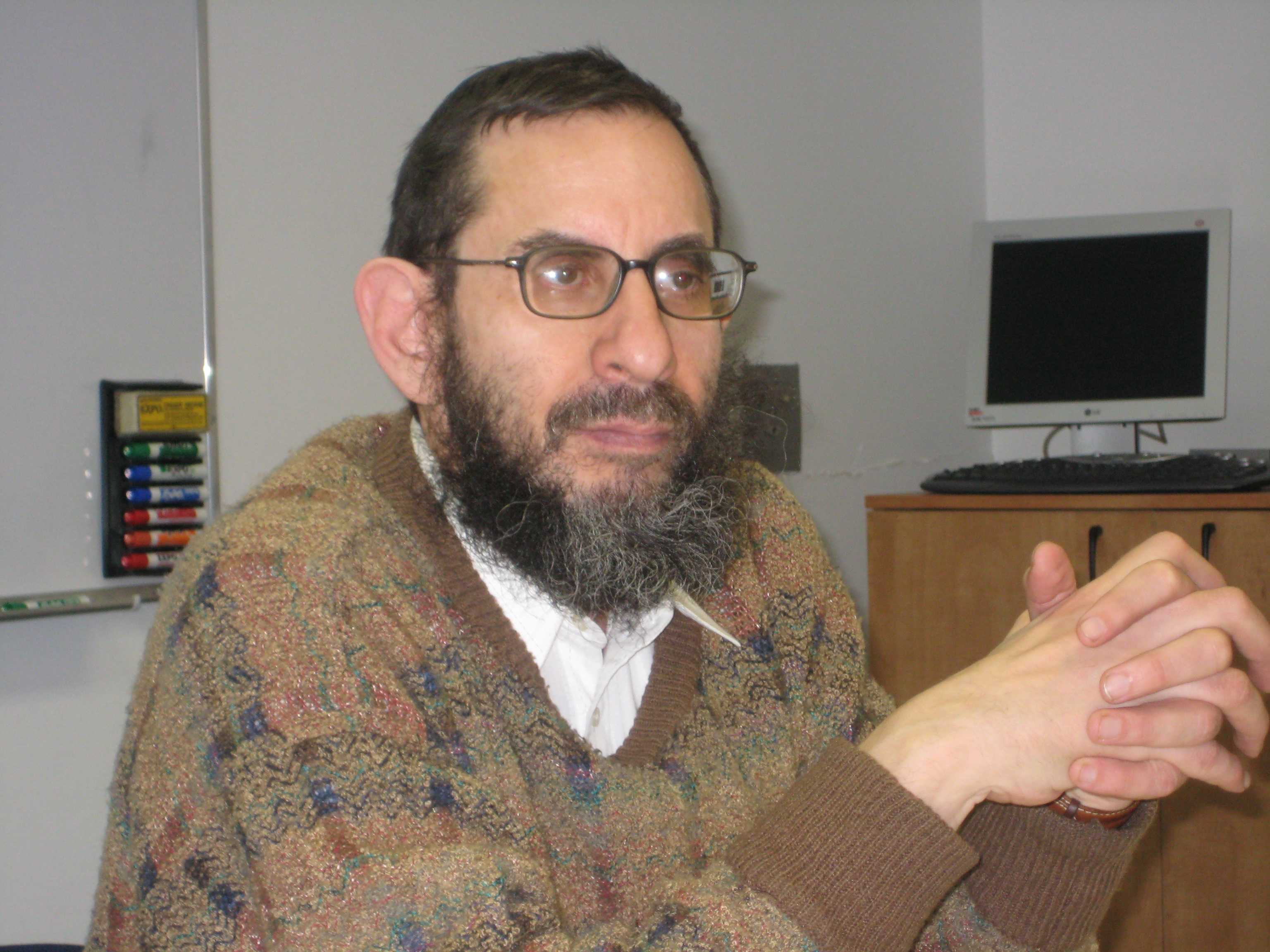

Personal life
- Education: Yeshiva University

Religious life
- Religion: Judaism
- Denomination: Orthodox Judaism
- Profession: Rabbi teaching at Yeshiva University
- Yeshiva: Yeshiva College
- Organisation: Tradition
- Residence: Brooklyn, NY
- Semikhah: RIETS

Shalom Carmy (born May 1, 1949) is an Orthodox rabbi teaching Jewish studies and philosophy at Yeshiva University, where he is Chair of Bible and Jewish philosophy at Yeshiva College and an affiliated scholar at Benjamin N. Cardozo School of Law. He is also Editor Emeritus of Tradition, an Orthodox theological journal, and formerly wrote a regular column in First Things.

A Brooklyn native, he is a prominent Modern Orthodox theologian, historian, and philosopher. He received his B.A. in 1969 and M.S. from Yeshiva University, and received his rabbinic ordination from its affiliated Rabbi Isaac Elchanan Theological Seminary, studying under Rabbis Aharon Lichtenstein and Joseph Soloveitchik. He has edited some of R. Soloveitchik's work for publication. Carmy has written many articles on Biblical theology, Jewish thought, Orthodoxy in the 20th century and the role of liberal arts in a Torah education. He edited "Modern Scholarship in the Study of Torah: Contributions and Limitations" (ISBN 1-56821-450-2), “Jewish Perspectives on the Experience of Suffering” as well as several other works. He writes a regular personal column in Tradition, and contributes regularly on Jewish and general subjects to First Things and other journals. In addition to his exegetical and analytic work, Carmy's theological contribution is distinguished by preoccupation with the way religious doctrine and practice express themselves in the life of the individual.

== Thought ==
One of Carmy's most consequential essays has attempted to develop what he has called "literary-theological approach" to modern biblical scholarship, including biblical archaeology and higher textual criticism. Carmy contemplates a system of biblical study and engagement by Orthodox individuals with aspects of biblical scholarship with the ability to digest, integrate, and build upon an authentic engagement with Jewish thought and modern academic approaches to biblical literature without falling into apologetics.

"[W]e assert the conviction that Bible is to be encountered as the word of God, rather than primarily as the object of academic investigation; we also refer to the authoritative presence of the interpretive tradition. The adjective literary comes to stress that understanding the word of God is not only a matter of apprehending propositions, but also of hearing them in their literary and historical context; secondarily, we are reminded that the language we use to articulate our insight is also an integral aspect of our study..."

First, Carmy suggests that the Orthodox perspective on biblical literature should be integrated into the study of bible by student from the Orthodox community in entering into engagement with the academy. This outlook serves to lay the groundwork for further speculation and informs the study by the whole academy. He warns that failure to engage is not an option.

"[I]f the university orientation becomes the paradigm and pattern for our study, then the quasi-critical and speculative subjects peripheral to the study of devar Ha-Shem-issues of authorship, dating, historical background and the like will inexorably work their way to the top of our syllabi. And if that is the case, then the marginality of Bible in the curriculum will necessarily be reinforced, as student and layman come to experience Tanakh not as the occasion for confrontation with God and with ourselves, but as a complex of preoccupations, a sideshow of "problems," a vermiform appendix in the body politic of Torah, useless in itself, worthy of attention only when it causes pain or becomes infected."

Carmy suggests that Orthodox Bible student should understand the modern methodologies of the academy, but should balance this with an a priori reverence for scripture and simultaneously voice a respectful dissension to academic methodology's conclusions when they are unchallenged simply because they originate from the academy where necessary. Carmy suggests that conflicts between findings of the academy and traditional scholarship cannot be simply papered over, but that "so long as we believe that there is a solution, [challenging academic findings] need not affect the way we study Bible day by day." The second aspect of this approach Carmy presents as built off his interpretation of the mystic-philosophical approach of Rabbi Abraham Isaac Kook towards potentially problematic academic interpretations of religious literature. He asserts that we must "build a palace of Torah" on top of the challenges. Where appropriate, the observant scholar should assume an ability to integrate enlightening aspects of modern scholarship into formulations of Jewish Theology (Carmy assumes the Tanakh to be the core prism through which any vision of Jewish Theology must pass), but should refrain from hinging theology on any particular discovery.

Early in his teaching career he devised an imaginary television series, Police Philosopher, about a philosopher who gets involved in police cases. This is part a running theme in Carmy's teaching where he touches on popular film or literature as an explanatory device for a given topic. Carmy has said that "Police Philosopher was born the day I spied an ad in a professional journal, seeking a professor of philosophy prepared to teach at a local precinct so that the cops could get college credit without having to be on campus. Wouldn't it be interesting if the professor got involved in police cases?"

== Publications ==
- Forgive us, father-in-law, for we know not what to think : letter to a philosophical dropout from orthodoxy (2004)
