= Yeshivas Itri =

Yeshiva in Jerusalem

Coordinates: 31.7447°N 35.2109°E

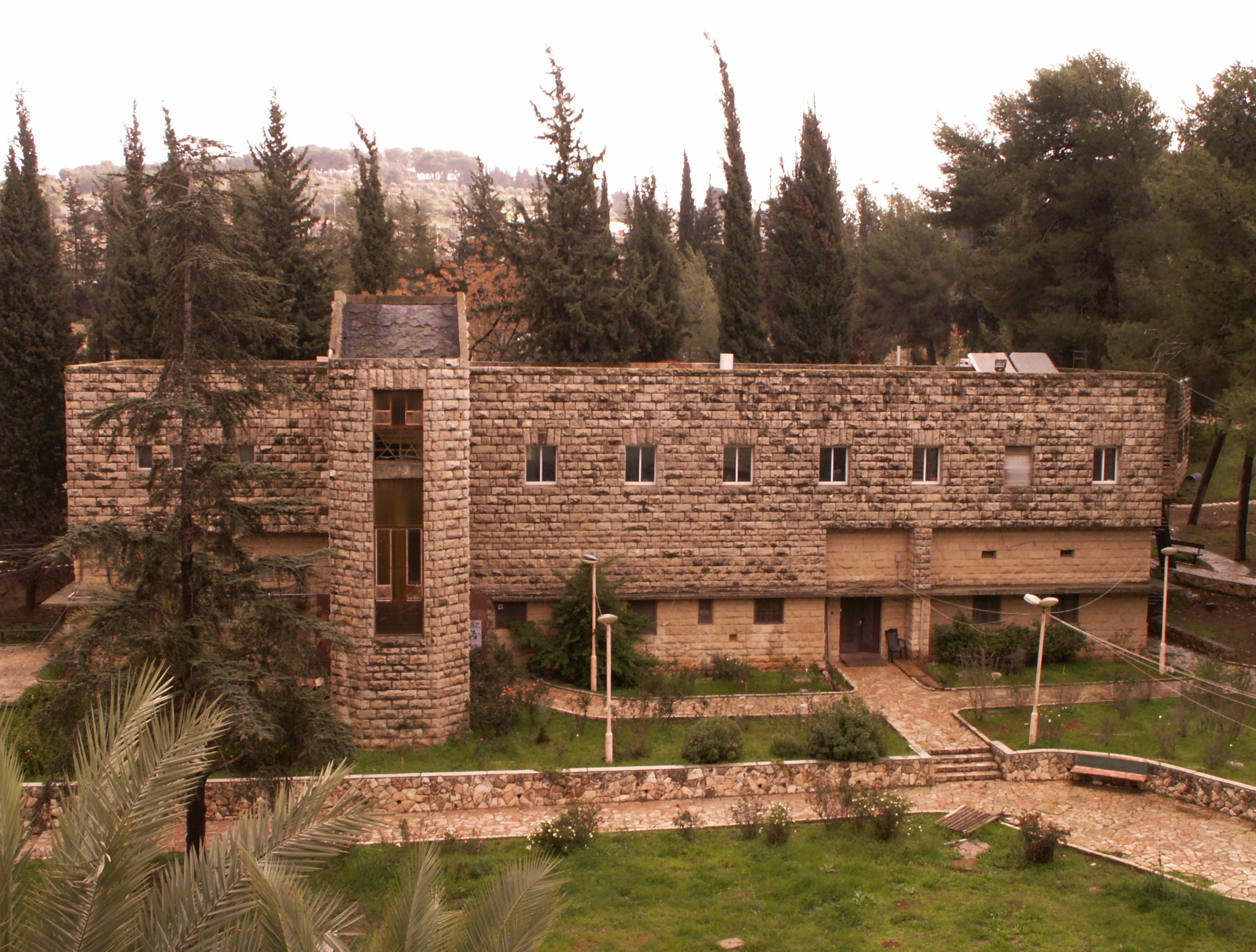
- Jerusalem

Information
- Type: Yeshiva
- Established: 1968
- Rosh yeshivas: Rabbi Yitzchak Bertler; Rabbi Ariav Ozer
- Affiliation: Orthodox

Yeshivas Itri (Hebrew: ישיבת איתרי) is an Orthodox yeshiva in southeast Jerusalem. Founded in 1968 by Rabbi Mordechai Elefant, the yeshiva has several branches in Israel and the United States, and spawned several educational programs for Diaspora Jews.

== Name ==
The name of the yeshiva is an acronym for Israel Torah Research Institute. From its founding, the yeshiva was officially called Yeshivas Midrash HaTalmud Tiferes Avraham – Itri (Yeshiva for the Study of the Talmud, Glory of Abraham – Itri). After the death of Rabbi Elefant, its founder, in 2009, the name was changed to Yeshivas Midrash HaTalmud Zehav Mordechai – Itri (Yeshiva for the Study of the Talmud, Gold of Mordechai – Itri).

== History ==
Yeshivas Itri was founded in 1968 by Rabbi Mordechai Elefant, an American-born educator who was a close student of Rabbis Aharon Kotler (Founder of Bet Midrash Govoha, student at Slabodka) and Yitzchok Zev Soloveitchik. He married the granddaughter of Yaakov Yosef Herman. The initial student body comprised 60 kollel students, but enrollment soon expanded with unmarried yeshiva students. The yeshiva met for several years in the Orient House hotel in East Jerusalem. Rabbi Elefant moved it to the premises of an old British Mandate hospital in the southeast of the city, near the Arab village of Beit Safafa, in the 1970s. Students were housed in adjacent apartments.

By 1971, enrollment was at 250 students, the majority from the United States. The yeshiva received funding from the American Jewish Joint Distribution Committee, government sources, and private donations.

Over time, the institution grew to encompass a kollel, yeshiva gedola, yeshiva ketana, and Talmud Torah. Branches of the yeshiva were also opened in Hadera and in the United States.

=== Fraud investigation ===
In 1999 yeshiva administrator Rabbi Chaim Weiss and businessman David Appel were suspected of embezzling NIS 9 million from yeshiva coffers during Rabbi Elefant's medical leave. The police investigation carried on for years; by 2014, police theorized that the stolen money was meant to pay for the defense of Aryeh Deri, who was convicted on charges of fraud and bribery in 2000.

== Offshoots ==
Several educational programs for Diaspora Jews were spun off from Yeshivas Itri. They include:

- Yeshivat HaMivtar, founded in 1967 by alumnus Rabbi Chaim Brovender for English-speaking college-age students.
- Yeshiva Shaar Hatorah, founded in 1974 in Queens, New York as a branch of Yeshivas Itri by Rabbis Kalman Epstein and Sholom Spitz.
- Shvut Ami Center for Russian Jews, founded in 1976 as a branch of Yeshivas Itri by Shimon Grilius, a former Prisoner of Zion; it later became an independent program.
- Bruria (later Shappell's women's college), founded in 1976 by Rabbi Chaim Brovender as a spinoff of Yeshivas Itri's women's program.
- Shapell's/Darche Noam (originally known as Hartman's), was a spinoff of the Yeshivas Itri program for English-speaking men.

== Faculty ==
=== Present ===
- Rabbi Ariav Ozer, rosh yeshiva
- Rabbi Meir Shimon Spitzer, Mashgiach

=== Past ===
- Rabbi Mordechai Elefant, rosh yeshiva
- Rabbi Shmuel Auerbach, rosh yeshiva and rosh mesivta
- Rabbi Michel Zilber, rosh mesivta
- Rabbi Dovid Eliach, mashgiach
- Rabbi Zev Getzil, mashgiach
- Rabbi Shlomo Fischer, rosh yeshiva
- Rabbi Yitzchok Bretler, Rosh Heshivah 1980-2022
- Rabbi Raphael Wexelbaum, rosh mesivta
- Rabbi Asher Zelig Rubinstein, mashgiach in the mesivta
- Rabbi Amiram Shkedi, rebbi in the mesivta

== Noted alumni ==
- Chaim Brovender
- Hanoch Teller

== Kiryat Itri ==
Rabbi Elefant founded the Kiryat Itri neighborhood in northern Jerusalem in 1967, the year before he established the yeshiva. This Orthodox Jewish housing development, adjacent to Kiryat Mattersdorf and designed for 250 families, was undertaken in cooperation with the Jewish Agency for Israel to encourage American Jewish immigration to Israel. Rabbi Nathan Kamenetsky, an instructor at Yeshivas Itri, lived in Kiryat Itri with his family.
