= Mayanot =

Chabad school

Mayanot Institute of Jewish Studies
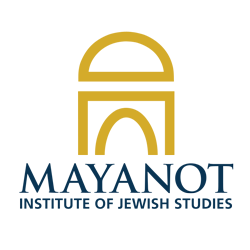
- Mayanot logo
- Other name: מעיינות
- Established: 1996
- Focus: Yeshiva
- Key people: Rabbi Yisroel Noach Wichnin, Rabbi Kasriel Shemtov
- Location: Jerusalem, Israel
- Website: mayanot.edu

Mayanot Institute of Jewish Studies (מעיינות lit. 'Wellsprings'), is an educational Lubavitch institution in Jerusalem for Jewish students interested in experiencing and deepening their unique bond with the Jewish People and the Land of Israel, for those aged 18–32, with an executive learning option for those aged 32 and over.

Classes include instruction in Jewish Mysticism, Philosophy, Talmud, Torah, Chassidut, and the Hebrew Language. The Mayanot Men's Program was founded in 1996, the Women's Program started in 2008, the Post High School program began in 2016, and the Zal Program started in 2022.

== Programs ==
- Men’s Program

General program for those with a basic/adept understanding of Judaism and Talmudic Studies

- JSP (Jewish Studies Program)

Program for beginners featuring classes Introducing the basics of both Talmud and Judaism

- Post High School Program

Program for High School graduates who want to experience a gap year-styled program.

- Shana Bet Program

A second year yeshivah-styled program generally tailored to those who were in the Post High School Program and wish to further enhance their Talmudic studies.

- Executive Program

A summer program meant for career workers to learn basics of Talmud.

== Shluchim ==
Every year a group of Shluchim are sent to assist the teachers and Mashpi’im of the Yeshiva in setting an example for today's young men. They do so by instituting mivtzahs - programs which encourage the practice of Chassidic life and other initiatives such as learning with the students. In most years, the shluchim are sent from Oholei Torah Rabbinical College in America.

== Philosophy ==
Creating a Jewishly educated Leadership.

The name ‘Mayanot’ was chosen, based on the verse, “Let thy wellsprings (Mayanot) be dispersed abroad.” (Proverbs 5:16), and captures the essence of the Mayanot vision – that students are gaining a deep and enduring knowledge of their Jewish heritage, including the spiritual dimensions, and utilizing what they have learned at Mayanot to enrich their environment and communities back home.

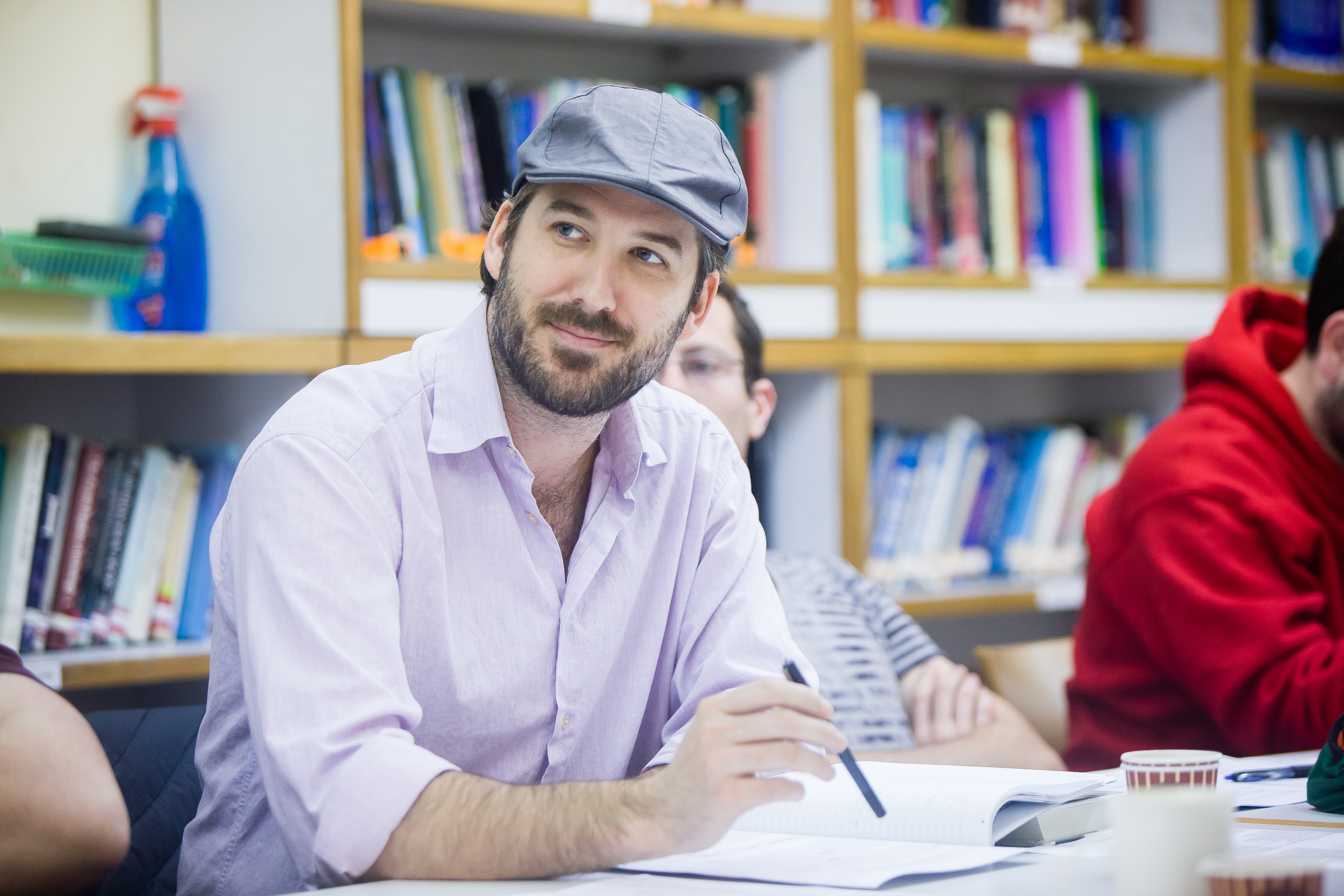
Student at Mayanot

== Administration ==
- Rabbi Kasriel Shemtov - Executive Director
- Rabbi Shlomo Gestetner - Dean
- Rabbi Yisroel Noach Wichnin - Rosh Yeshiva
- Rivka Marga Gestetner - Director of Education for the Women's Learning Program
- Rabbi Meir Levinger - Director of Education for the Men's Learning Program
- Aryeh Leib Rosenbaum - Secretary of Mayanot Institute of Jewish Studies
- Phillip Krinkin - Bursar of Mayanot Institute of Jewish Studies
- Rabbi Shneor Broh - Director of the Post High School Program (for men)
- Rabbi Yossi Shemtov - Director of the Shana Bet and Executive Programs (for men)
- Rabbi Levi Margolin - Director of the Mayanot Birthright Israel division
- Rabbi Boruch Kaplan - Educator for the Mayanot Men’s Program

== Location ==
The men's campus is centrally located in Jerusalem. It is within walking distance to the Kotel and the Jerusalem Central Bus Station. The men's campus is a few blocks away from Mahane Yehuda Market, also known as "the shuk", and opposite Sacher Park. The women's campus is in the Rechavia neighborhood in Jerusalem.

== Learning style ==
Mayanot strives to accommodate Jews from all types of backgrounds. Talmud study is broken down into eight levels of study. The goal is to take students from learning the Hebrew alphabet to learning a section of Gemara on their own within 24 months. This unique method of Talmud study is fast gaining international recognition. Yeshivas in Europe, Australia, and America have written to Mayanot asking staff members to conduct in-service programs for their teachers, so that they may implement the methodology in their own classrooms. Rabbi Baruch Kaplan traveled to Australia where he trained several teachers at a college of Jewish Studies.

Students have a choice of learning options from classroom to chavruta style learning: Yeshiva students prepare for and review the shiur with their chavruta during a study session known as a seder. In contrast to conventional classroom learning, in which a teacher lectures to the student and the student repeats the information back in tests, chavruta-style learning challenges the student to analyze and explain the material, point out the errors in his partner's reasoning, and question and sharpen each other's ideas, often arriving at entirely new insights of the meaning of the text.

== Accreditation ==
Mayanot Institute of Jewish Studies is an accredited institution of MASA, a joint project of the Jewish Agency and the government of Israel. The school advises students who wish to obtain credit for their courses at Mayanot to consult with their school's admissions office to arrange the transfer of credits in advance.

== Scholarship fund ==
One of the donors to the yeshiva is the Schottenstein family. They have donated to the men's dorms and the program in general. They are quoted as saying, [it was a] "thrill to support" Mayanot, and it was, for him, "a 'blue chip investment'".

Ben Federman and David Schottenstein together with his wife Eda partnered on a joint philanthropic project to launch the Mayanot Institute of Jewish Studies Midwest Scholarship Fund. The Schottenstein family supports a number of key projects at Mayanot, including the "Saul’s Scholars" summer program scholarship, dedicated by William and Thomas Schottenstein in the memory of their late uncle, Saul Schottenstein.

== Notable alumni ==
- Sammy Harkham - cartoonist
- Simcha Weinstein - the "Comic Book Rabbi"
- Alex Clare - British singer and songwriter

== See also ==
- Orthodox Judaism outreach
- Baal teshuva
- Jewish fundamentalism
