= Tradition (journal) =

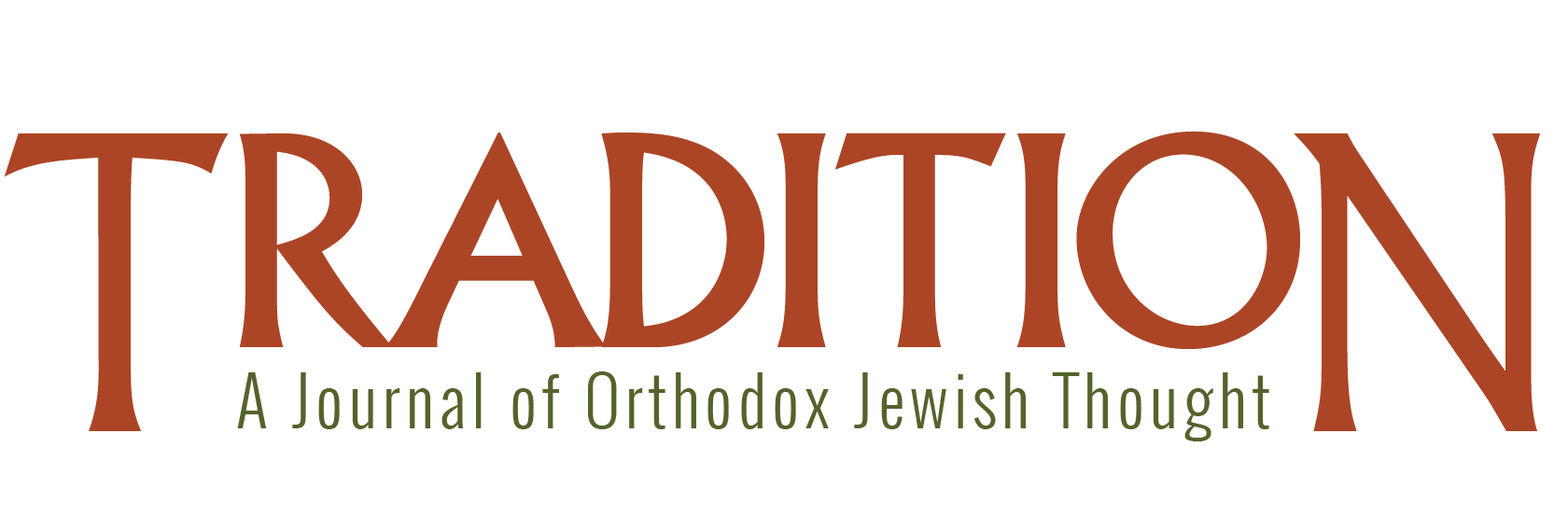
- Discipline: Jewish studies
- Language: English
- Edited by: Jeffrey Saks

Publication details
- History: 1958–present
- Publisher: Rabbinical Council of America (United States)
- Frequency: Quarterly

Standard abbreviations
- ISO 4: Tradition

Indexing
- ISSN: 0041-0608
- LCCN: 65049751
- JSTOR: 00410608
- OCLC no.: 242975206

Links
- Journal homepage; Online access; Online archive

Tradition: A Journal of Orthodox Jewish Thought is a quarterly Orthodox Jewish peer-reviewed academic journal published by the Rabbinical Council of America. It covers a range of topics including philosophy and theology, history, law, and ethics. It was established in 1958 by the founding editor-in-chief Norman Lamm. He was succeeded by Walter Wurzburger (1962–1988), Emanuel Feldman (1988–2001), Michael Shmidman (2001–2004), and Shalom Carmy (2004–2019). Jeffrey Saks was named the journal's sixth editor in January 2019.

== Abstracting and indexing ==
The journal is abstracted and indexed in the Atla Religion Database, Modern Language Association Database, and ProQuest databases.

== Anthologies ==
Various themed book collections have been published anthologizing essays first published in the journal:

- A Treasury of Tradition, ed. N. Lamm and W. Wuzrburger (Hebrew Publishing Company, 1967)
- The Conversion Crisis, ed. E. Feldman and J. Wolowelsky (Ktav Publishers, 1990)
- Jewish Law and the New Reproductive Technologies, ed. E. Feldman and J. Wolowelsky (Ktav Publishers, 1997)
- Exploring the Thought of Rabbi Joseph B. Soloveitchik, ed. M. Angel (Ktav Publishers, 1997)
- Rabbi Joseph B. Soloveitchik: Man of Halacha, Man of Faith, ed. M. Genack (Ktav Publishers, 1998)
- Women and the Study of Torah, ed. J. Wolowelsky (Ktav Publishers, 2001)
