= Rust Belt Music =

American band

Rust Belt Music (sometimes abbreviated RBM) is a San Francisco-based band that formed in 2001. The band has toured the United States. The original members were John Lindenbaum (vocals, guitar), Chris Cortelyou (drums), Laurin Askew (bass) and Micah Weinberg (keyboards). Askew and Weinberg were eventually replaced with Jason Michael (bass) and Andre Perry (keyboards).

In addition, Lindenbaum regularly performs solo acoustic sets, and Lindenbaum and Perry also perform together in The Lonelyhearts.

== Discography ==
- Glory in Excelsior (2001)
- The Third Unplanned Child (2002)
- Deborah (2002)
- Dodge (2003)
- Builder (2004)
- The Christmas Day EP (2005) (John Lindenbaum solo EP)
- The Company Town (2006)
- The Easter Sunday EP (2007)
