= Ohr Torah Stone =

- אור תורה סטון
- Formation: 1983; 43 years ago
- Founded at: Efrat
- Services: Jewish education and social justice
- President: Rabbi Dr. Kenneth Brander
- Founder, Chancellor and Rosh HaYeshiva: Rabbi Dr. Shlomo Riskin
- Subsidiaries: Center for Jewish–Christian Understanding and Cooperation (CJCUC), Midreshet Lindenbaum
- Website: www.ots.org.il

Ohr Torah Stone (OTS) (Hebrew: אור תורה סטון) is an international Modern Orthodox organization that aims to develop Jewish life, learning, and leadership. The organization is led by Rabbi Kenneth Brander. OTS was founded by Rabbi Shlomo Riskin in 1983. As of 2020, OTS included 27 educational institutions under its auspices.

The organization also includes a network of over 300 emissaries who serve in positions of spiritual and educational leadership across North America, South America, Central America, Australia, and New Zealand. The organization has implemented initiatives in Jewish women's leadership and empowerment, leadership training, Jewish outreach, and social action. These programs have garnered national and international recognition for their innovative approach. OTS has stated that its primary guiding principle is to ensure the accessibility of Judaism to every Jew—particularly addressing populations that have historically been marginalized, disenfranchised, or alienated.

== Jewish women's empowerment ==
OTS programs for women have played a role in advancing Orthodox female scholarship and leadership. The organization established the first school dedicated to teaching advanced Talmud to post-high school-age women. The women's college affiliated with OTS hosts the largest women's beit midrash (study hall) in recorded Jewish history. Notably, graduates from the college have become leaders in Jewish communities globally, with one even being the first female to officially serve as the director of a rabbinical court.

OTS's women's college developed a program specifically for women with special needs. The curriculum allows participants to acquire both learning and vocational skills, build independence, and improve self-esteem while expanding their love of Torah, Israel, and the Jewish people. The program had proven so successful that in 2017, a parallel program was established for young men.

Another OTS program enables religious women to serve in the Israeli army. Previously, Israeli women were forced to choose between service to their country and an observant lifestyle. By way of the program, female participants are inducted as a group and strengthened by intense study before, during, and after their service.

OTS also opened the first school in the world to train, certify, and ordain women as heter hora’ah, or "permission to make Halachic decisions," for service in the rabbinical courts. Only because of OTS's appeal to the Israeli Supreme Court did women win the legal right to practice in the courts–an arena that was previously open only to men. The school then opened a Legal Aid Center and Hotline for Israeli women who are agunot (The agunah is a woman literally “chained” to a dead or abusive marriage whose husband refuses to grant her a Jewish writ of divorce) and need free advice and legal representation in matters pertaining to the process of obtaining a religious divorce.

== Contemporary Jewish leadership ==
Ohr Torah Stone's Rabbinical Seminary prepares rabbis to be both fluent in secular learning as well as the Talmud. The curriculum is geared toward contemporary concerns as well as Jewish law and legal texts. At the same time, the OTS Educators Institute comprehensively trains educators to teach Judaic Studies in both Orthodox and non-Orthodox state and community schools across Israel and the Diaspora.

An additional OTS yeshiva is geared toward young men both with and without previous yeshiva backgrounds from North America, Europe, South Africa, and Australia.

Hundreds of OTS-trained teachers and spiritual leaders have served in communities spanning the globe.

Many of the OTS graduates have joined the ranks of OTS-trained Jewish Cultural Facilitators who provide formal and informal Jewish education for Israelis of all ages and backgrounds. This initiative works in conjunction with Israeli Community Centers. Media coverage has reported that these facilitators actively promote Jewish values, national unity, and heritage awareness in a non-coercive environment.

== OTS high schools ==
OTS has established 6 modern Orthodox high schools within the Jerusalem and Gush Etzion regions. All of these high schools offer official matriculation and have been awarded the recognition of excellence from the Israeli Ministry of Education.

== OTS around the world ==
Each year, OTS sends spiritual and educational leaders to serve as emissaries in Jewish communities all over the world. These emissaries are active in synagogues, campuses and schools, and Jewish communities across the globe.

== Schools and programs ==
=== Programs for men ===
- Joseph and Gwendolyn Straus Rabbinical Seminary
- Robert M. Beren College
- Robert M. Beren Machanaim Hesder Yeshiva
- OTS Metivta, Carmiel
- Elaine And Norm Brodsky Darkaynu Program

=== Programs for women ===
- Midreshet Lindenbaum College for Women, Jerusalem
- Midreshet Lindenbaum-Lod
- Midreshet Lindenbaum-Matat, Carmiel
- Yad La’isha: The Monica Dennis Goldberg Legal Aid Center And Hotline For Women

=== Emissary programs ===
- Beren-Amiel Educational Emissaries
- Claudia Cohen Women Educators Institute
- Maarava – Rabbinic Emissaries to Sephardic Communities
- Straus-Amiel Rabbinic Emissaries
- OTS Amiel BaKehila
- Ohr Torah Nidchei Yisrael
- Yachad Program for Jewish Identity

=== Junior high and high schools ===
- Derech Avot Junior High and High School for Boys, Efrat
- Jacob Sapirstein Junior High and High School For Boys, Ramot, Jerusalem
- Jennie Sapirstein Junior High and High School For Girls, Ramot, Jerusalem
- Neveh Channah High School for Girls, In Memory Of Anna Ehrman, Gush Etzion
- Neveh Shmuel Yeshiva High School for Boys, In Memory Of Samuel Pinchas Ehrman, Efrat
- Oriya Girls' High School, Gush Etzion
- Ann Belsky Moranis Program For Arts And Drama

=== Conversion programs ===
- Conversion Institute for Spanish Speakers - Efrat, Israel
- Jewish Learning Center - New York

=== International programs ===
- Hertog Center for Jewish-Christian Understanding And Cooperation (CJCUC)
- OMEK - A Transformative Learning and Touring Experience in Israel
