= Zalman Nechemia Goldberg =

Israeli rabbi and rabbinic judge (1931–2020)

Rabbi Zalman Nechemia Goldberg זלמן נחמיה גולדברג
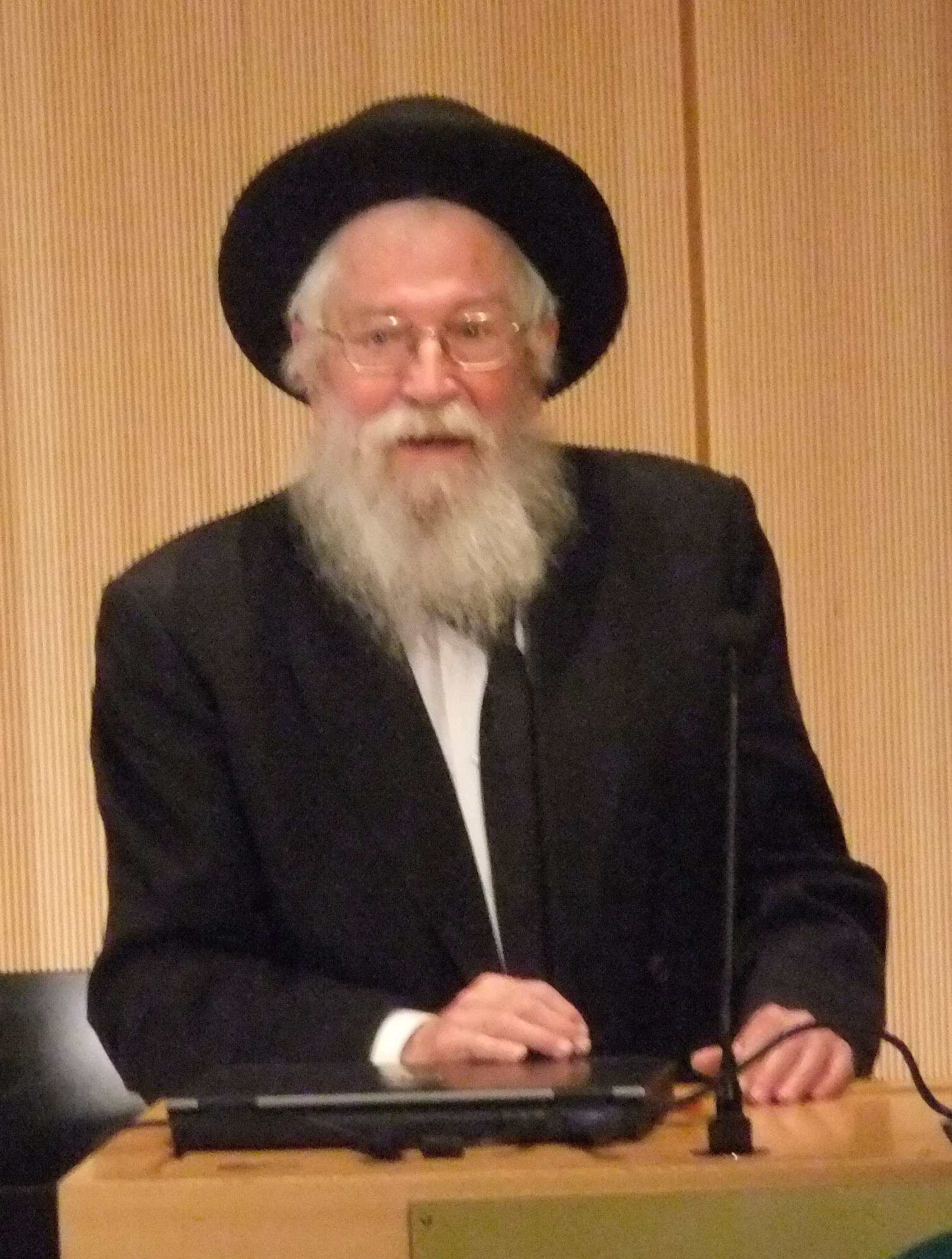
- Goldberg in 2011

Personal life
- Born: 28 January 1931 Minsk, Soviet Union
- Died: 20 August 2020 (aged 89) Jerusalem, Israel
- Occupation: Rabbi

Religious life
- Religion: Judaism
- Denomination: Orthodox Judaism
- Yeshiva: Sadigura
- Organisation: Jerusalem Rabbinical High Court

Zalman Nechemia Goldberg (Hebrew: זלמן נחמיה גולדברג; 28 January 1931 – 20 August 2020) was an Ashkenazi rabbi, posek (decider on points of religious law), and rosh yeshiva (dean) in Israel. He was a son-in-law of Shlomo Zalman Auerbach.

Rabbi Goldberg was an authority on halakha (Jewish law) and the Av Bet Din (Chief Justice) of the Rabbinical High Court in Jerusalem, where he made rulings on the issues of gittin (divorce) decrees, ketubot (marriage contracts), artificial insemination, and the commandment of living in the Land of Israel. He co-authored the Jewish prenuptial agreement sponsored by the Rabbinical Council of America together with Mordechai Willig.

Rabbi Goldberg was the rosh yeshiva of both the Sadigura Hasidic yeshiva and the Jerusalem College of Technology (Machon Lev), and headed the Institute for the Higher Study of Halacha (Machon Iyun Ha'Halacha) in Jerusalem. He lectured extensively at Chabad's Yeshivat Torat Emet of Jerusalem on matters of Jewish law.

Rabbi Goldberg was also well known for his semicha (rabbinic ordination) exams, which were often taken as an alternative to those offered by the Israeli Rabbinate.

Rabbi Goldberg became the editor-in-chief of Encyclopedia Talmudit in 2008.

In November 2009, he wrote an endorsement for The King's Torah, a controversial book by Yitzhak Shapira. He later rescinded it, saying that the book includes statements that "have no place in human intelligence."

Rabbi Goldberg died on 20 August 2020 at Hadassah Medical Center in Ein Kerem, a week after collapsing in his home and was buried in Mount of Olives cemetery.
