= Midreshet Lindenbaum =

Women's seminary in Jerusalem

- מדרשת לינדנבאום

Religion
- Affiliation: Modern Orthodox Judaism

Location
- Municipality: Talpiot, Jerusalem
- Country: Israel
- Interactive map of Midreshet Lindenbaum
- Coordinates: 31.7443°N 35.2211°E

Architecture
- Founder: Rabbi Chaim Brovender
- Established: 1976; 50 years ago

Website
- midreshet-lindenbaum.org.il

Midreshet Lindenbaum (Hebrew: מדרשת לינדנבאום), originally named Michlelet Bruria, is an Orthodox midrasha in Talpiot, Jerusalem. It counts among its alumnae many of the teachers at Matan, Nishmat, Pardes and other women's and co-ed yeshivas in Israel and abroad.

== History ==
Michlelet Bruria was founded in 1976 by Rabbi Chaim Brovender, as the woman's component of Yeshivat Hamivtar. At Bruria, as in a traditional men's yeshiva, women studied in hevrutot (a traditional Jewish system of partner-based religious study) and learned Talmud as well as advanced Tanakh. In 1986, Bruria merged with Ohr Torah Stone Institutions and was renamed "Midreshet Lindenbaum" after Belda and Marcel Lindenbaum.

== Programs ==
Midreshet Lindenbaum offers a certificate in "Halachik leadership" (Hebrew: מנהיגות הלכתית), a five-year course in advanced studies in Jewish law, with examinations equivalent to the rabbinate's ordination requirement for men. It also runs a Torah study program for developmentally disabled young men and women known as Midreshet / Yeshivat Darkaynu.

The midrasha has been a leader in developing women's role in rabbinical courts in Israel and in founding the first school dedicated to training women to serve as advocates in rabbinical courts, known as Toanot Rabniyot. Lindenbaum also operates a legal aid center and hotline which has taken an active role in advocating for a resolution to the Agunah problem.

== See also ==
- Maharat
- Beit Midrash Har'el
