= Modern Orthodox Judaism =

Movement in Orthodox Judaism

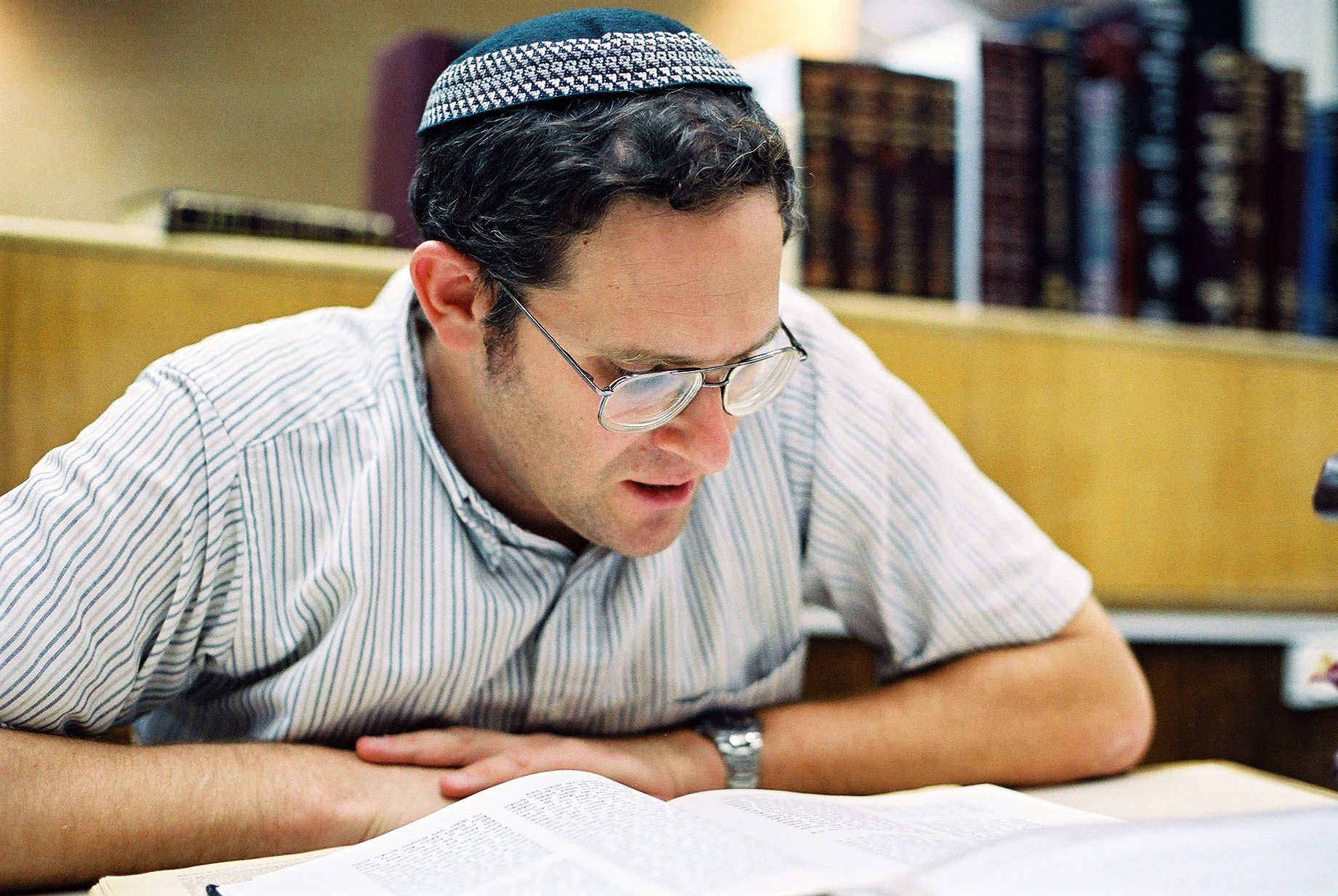
- Rabbi Mosheh Lichtenstein, a Modern Orthodox Rabbi at Yeshivat Har Etzion

Total population
- Approx. 700,000 to 1 million globally

Founder
- Samson Raphael Hirsch, Azriel Hildesheimer

Regions with significant populations
- Worldwide
- United States: Approx. 250,000
- Israel: Approx. 350,000
- United Kingdom: Approx. 30,000

Religions
- Judaism

Scriptures
- Torah, Nevi'im, Ketuvim

Languages
- Hebrew, English, Yiddish

Related ethnic groups
- Orthodox Judaism, Religious Zionism

Modern Orthodox Judaism (also Modern Orthodox or Modern Orthodoxy) is a movement within Orthodox Judaism that synthesizes Jewish values and the observance of Jewish law with the modern world.

Modern Orthodoxy draws on several teachings and philosophies, and thus assumes various forms. In the United States, and generally in the Western world, Centrist Orthodoxy underpinned by the philosophy of Torah Umadda ("Torah and secular knowledge") is prevalent. In Israel, Modern Orthodoxy is dominated by Religious Zionism; however, although not identical, these movements share many of the same values and many of the same adherents.

== Modern Orthodoxy ==
Modern Orthodoxy comprises a fairly broad spectrum of movements; each movement draws upon several distinct, though related, philosophies, which (in some combination) provide the basis for all variations of the movement today.

=== Characteristics ===
In general, Modern Orthodoxy's "overall approach ... is the belief that one can and should be a full member of modern society, accepting the risks to remaining observant, because the benefits outweigh those risks". Jews should engage constructively with the world that they are in to foster goodness and justice within both themselves and the larger community, such as by avoiding sin in their personal lives while also caring for the unfortunate.

Thus, Modern Orthodoxy holds that Jewish law is normative and binding, while simultaneously attaching a positive value to interaction with the modern world. In this view, as expressed by Rabbi Saul Berman, Orthodox Judaism can "be enriched" by its intersection with modernity; further, "modern society creates opportunities to be productive citizens engaged in the Divine work of transforming the world to benefit humanity". At the same time, in order to preserve the integrity of halakha, any area of "powerful inconsistency and conflict" between Torah and modern culture must be filtered out.

Modern Orthodoxy also assigns a central role to the "People of Israel". Here two characteristics are manifest: in general, Modern Orthodoxy places a high national, as well as religious, significance on the State of Israel, and institutions and individuals are, typically, Zionist in orientation; relatedly, involvement with non-orthodox Jews will extend beyond "outreach" to include institutional relations and cooperation; see further under Torah Umadda.

Other "core beliefs" are a recognition of the value and importance of secular studies, a commitment to equality of education for both men and women, and a full acceptance of the importance of being able to financially support oneself and one's family.

=== Ideological spectrum ===
The specific expression of Modern Orthodoxy, however, takes many forms, and particularly over the past 30–40 years, describes a political spectrum. Among the issues have been the extent to which Modern Orthodoxy should cooperate with the more liberal denominations, support secular academic pursuits combined with religious learning, and embrace efforts to give women a larger role in Jewish learning and worship; the acceptability of modern textual criticism as a tool for Torah study is also debated.

To the ideological right, the line between Haredi and Modern Orthodox has blurred in recent years; some have referred to this trend as "haredization". In addition to increasing stringency in adherence to Halakha, many Modern Orthodox Jews express a growing sense of distance from the larger, secular culture. ("Western civilisation has moved from what was once called the Judeo-Christian ethic to a consumer-driven, choice-fixated culture.... Such a world is not chol, but chiloni, not secular, but secularist. It is impermeable to the values of kedushah.") Here, "the balance has tipped heavily in favor of Torah over madda (secular studies) ... [and many] have redefined 'madda' as support for making one's livelihood in the secular world, not culturally or intellectually engaging with it." Although defining themselves as "centrist", institutions here include the Orthodox Union (Union of Orthodox Jewish Congregations of America), the Rabbinical Council of America, and the Rabbi Isaac Elchanan Theological Seminary.

Adherents on the ideological left have begun to develop new institutions that aim to be outward looking while maintaining a discourse between modernity and halakhah. The resultant "Open Orthodoxy" seeks to re-engage with secular studies, Jews of all denominations and global issues. Some within this movement have experimented with orthodox egalitarianism where gender equality solutions are found through halakhah. This has led to women taking on more leadership roles. Others in this movement are increasingly re-engaging with social justice issues from a halakhic point of view. Tikun Olam, "repairing the world", is re-mapped onto the values of social justice (with some contending that basic Judaism, correspondingly, receives less focus). See Yeshivat Chovevei Torah, Shalom Hartman Institute, Hebrew Institute of Riverdale, Partnership minyan, Shira Hadasha, Maharat.

=== The behaviorally modern ===
It is also noted that many Modern Orthodox are "behaviorally modern" as opposed to "ideologically modern", and, in truth, fall outside of "Modern" Orthodoxy, at least in the philosophical sense; see below. This phenomenon is sometimes termed "Social Orthodoxy".

The distinction is as follows: The ideologically modern are "meticulously observant of Halakha", and their interaction with the secular comprises a tangible expression of their ideology, wherever it may lie on the spectrum described. The "behaviorally modern", on the other hand, define themselves as "Modern Orthodox" only in the sense that they are neither Haredi ("Ultra-Orthodox") nor Conservative: these, in other words, are "not deeply concerned with philosophical ideas", and, often, are not as careful in their observance.

This "Orthodoxy of convenience" has maintained a certain stability over time: as long as these don't seek to legitimize their behaviour in halakhic terms, the leadership of the (Modern) Orthodox world have no particular difficulty with them.

=== Positioning ===
Various highly differing views (or non views) – ranging from traditionalist to revisionist – are thus offered under the banner of "Modern Orthodoxy". In fact, even among its leadership, there is limited agreement "on the philosophical parameters of modern Orthodoxy". The boundaries here, with respect to Haredi and Conservative Judaism, have therefore become increasingly indistinct. At the same time, some elements of Haredi Judaism appear to be more receptive to messages that have traditionally been part of the Modern-Orthodox agenda. Similarly, at Modern Orthodoxy's left, many appear to align with more traditional elements of Conservative Judaism. In discussing "Modern Orthodoxy", it is thus also important to clarify its position with reference to other movements in Judaism: see § Comparison with other movements below. Further, given this wide range of views, some see the possibility that, in fact, "[t]here is no longer a cohesive, singular Modern Orthodoxy"; see further below.

== Philosophy ==
Modern Orthodoxy traces its roots to the works of Rabbis Azriel Hildesheimer (1820–1899) and Samson Raphael Hirsch (1808–1888). While Hildesheimer's role is not disputed—comprising distinct philosophic and pragmatic contributions—Hirsch's role is less clear, with some Hirsch scholars arguing that his "Torah im Derech Eretz" philosophy is in fact at odds with that of Modern Orthodoxy; see further below and in the Hildesheimer article. Today, the movement is additionally, and particularly, influenced by the philosophy of Rabbi Joseph B. Soloveitchik and the closely related Torah Umadda, as well as by the writings of Rabbi Abraham Isaac Kook. (Religious Zionism, strictly speaking a distinct philosophy, has an indirect influence.)

=== Torah im Derech Eretz ===
Hirsch's Torah im Derech Eretz (תורה עם דרך ארץ – "Torah with the 'Way of the World'/Society") is a philosophy of Orthodox Judaism that formalizes a relationship between halakhically observant Judaism and the modern world. Hirsch held that Judaism requires the application of Torah philosophy to all human endeavor and knowledge compatible with it. Thus, secular education becomes a positive religious duty. "Judaism is not a mere adjunct to life: It comprises all of life ... in the synagogue and the kitchen, in the field and the warehouse, in the office and the pulpit ... with the pen and the chisel." Hirsch's vision, although not unqualified, extended to the sciences as well as to (German) literature, philosophy and culture. Torah im Derech Eretz remains influential to this day in all branches of Orthodox Judaism.

Neo Orthodoxy, the movement descended from Hirsch's Frankfurt community, regards itself as positioned, ideologically, outside of contemporary Modern Orthodoxy; see further below.

=== Pragmatism ===
Rabbi Azriel Hildesheimer, along with Rabbi Hirsch, was insistent that Orthodox Jews living in the west should not segregate themselves behind ghetto walls. On the contrary, modern Jewish education must teach Jews how best to confront and deal with modernity in all of its aspects. His approach, "Cultured Orthodoxy", was defined as representing "unconditional agreement with the culture of the present day; harmony between Judaism and science; but also unconditional steadfastness in the faith and traditions of Judaism".

He was, however, "the pragmatist rather than the philosopher", and it is his actions, rather than his philosophy, which have become institutionalized in Modern Orthodoxy, and through which his influence is still felt.

- He established Jewish education for males and females, which included both religious and secular studies.
- He established Hildesheimer Rabbinical Seminary, one of the first Orthodox yeshivot incorporating modern Jewish studies, secular studies, and academic scholarship in its curriculum.
- He was non-sectarian, and worked with communal leaders, even non-Orthodox ones, on issues that affected the community.
- He maintained traditional attachments to the Land of Israel, and worked with the non-Orthodox on its behalf.

=== Torah Umadda ===
Torah Umadda (תורה ומדע – "Torah and secular knowledge") is a philosophy concerning the secular world and Judaism, and in particular secular knowledge and Jewish knowledge. It envisions a personal—as opposed to philosophic—"synthesis" between Torah scholarship and Western, secular scholarship, entailing, also, positive involvement with the broader community. Here, the "individual has absorbed the attitudes characteristic of science, democracy, and Jewish life, and responds appropriately in diverse relations and contexts". The resultant mode of Orthodox Judaism is referred to as "Centrist Orthodoxy".

This philosophy, as formulated today, is to a large extent a product of the teachings and philosophy of Rabbi Joseph B. Soloveitchik (1903–1993), Rosh Yeshiva at Yeshiva University. In Rav Soloveitchik's thought, Judaism, which believes that the world is "very good", enjoins man to engage in tikkun olam. "Halakhic Man" must therefore attempt to bring the sanctity and purity of the transcendent realm into the material world. Centrist Orthodoxy is the dominant mode of Modern Orthodoxy in the United States, while Torah Umadda remains closely associated with Yeshiva University.

=== Religious Zionism ===
Modern Orthodoxy draws on the teachings of Rabbi Abraham Isaac Kook (1864–1935), as well as the writings and interpretations of his son Rabbi Zvi Yehuda Kook (1891–1982), both as regards their views on Jewish peoplehood and as they regard the (related) interaction with the secular world.

- "Rav Kook" saw Zionism as a part of a divine scheme finally to result in the resettlement of the Jewish people in its homeland, bringing redemption ("Geula") to the Jewish people, and the entire world.
- In Rav Kook's thought Kodesh and Chol (sacred and profane) play an important role: Kodesh is the inner taam (lit: "flavor") of reality, while Chol is that which is detached from Kodesh and is without any meaning; Judaism, then, is the vehicle "whereby we sanctify our lives, and attach all the practical, secular elements of life to spiritual goals which reflect the absolute meaning of existence – G-d Himself".

In Israel, the Religious Zionism of the Dati Leumi (דתי לאומי, "National Religious") dominates Modern Orthodoxy. Here too, the ideological basis is largely drawn from the teachings of Rav Kook, and there is therefore much overlap; philosophical differences, as well as other "non-modern" forms of Religious Zionism, are discussed below.

See also Mizrachi; Bnei Akiva; National Religious Party; Hesder; Mechina; Gush Emunim; Torat Eretz Yisrael.

== Comparison with other movements ==
As above, Modern Orthodoxy comprises various approaches, ranging from traditionalist to revisionist, and the movement apparently overlaps with Conservative Judaism and with Haredi Judaism at its respective boundaries. At its centre too, the movement appears to share practices and values with Neo Orthodoxy and with Religious Zionism. Therefore, in clarifying what Modern Orthodoxy in fact entails, its positioning must be discussed with reference to these movements.

=== Haredi Judaism ===
Although there is some question as how precisely to define the distinction between Modern Orthodoxy and Haredi Judaism, there is basic agreement that they may be distinguished on the basis of three major characteristics:

1. Modern Orthodoxy adopts a relatively inclusive stance toward society in general, and the larger Jewish community in particular.
2. Modern Orthodoxy is, in comparison, accommodating, "if not welcoming", to modernity, general scholarship, and science.
3. Modern Orthodoxy is almost uniformly receptive toward Israel and Zionism, viewing the State of Israel (in addition to the Land of Israel) as having inherent religious significance.

A fourth difference suggested, relates to the acceptability of moderation within Jewish law. Both Modern Orthodoxy and Ultra Orthodoxy regard Halakha as divine in origin, and as such, no position is assumed without justification in the Shulchan Aruch and in the Acharonim. The movements differ, however, in their approach to strictures (chumras) and leniencies (kulas). Modern Orthodoxy holds that strictures are not normative, rather, these are a matter of personal choice; "severity and leniency are relevant only in circumstances of factual doubt, not in situations of debate or varied practice. In the latter situations, the conclusion should be based solely on the legal analysis." See Torah Umadda § Moderation. Note though, that in recent years, many Modern Orthodox Jews are described as "increasingly stringent in their adherence to Jewish law". As to the contention that Modern Orthodoxy's standards of observance of halakha are "relaxed", as opposed to moderate, see below under Criticism. In the Haredi view, on the other hand, "the most severe position ... is the most likely basis for unity and commonality of practice within Orthodox community, and is therefore to be preferred". Further, "such severity ... results in the greatest certainty that God's will is being performed". Haredi Judaism thus tends to adopt chumras as a norm.

Related to this is the acceptance of the concept of Da'as Torah - the extent to which Orthodox Jews should seek the input of rabbinic scholars not just on matters of Jewish law, but on all important life matters. Most rabbinic leaders from Haredi communities view the concept as inextricably linked to the centuries of Jewish tradition. Within Modern Orthodox Judaism, many rabbis and scholars view the matter as a modern development that can be traced to changes in Jewish communal life in the nineteenth century. Thus, while the notion of da'as Torah is viewed by Haredi rabbis as a long-established tradition within Judaism, Modern Orthodox scholars argue that the Haredi claim is a revisionist one. According to Modern Orthodox scholars, although the term "da'as Torah" has been used in the past, the connotations of absolute rabbinic authority under this banner occurs only in the decades that follow the establishment of the Agudas Yisrael party in Eastern Europe. See Rabbinic authority § Orthodox Judaism and da'as Torah for further elaboration of these differences.

Modern Orthodoxy's efforts to encourage religious observance among non-Orthodox Jews has been likened to similar efforts by the Chabad movement. The similarity between the two groups in their relationships towards the non-Orthodox, and its adoption by some Haredi groups, has blurred the lines between the modern and Haredi segments of Orthodoxy.

=== Neo-Orthodoxy/Torah Im Derech Eretz ===
Both Modern Orthodoxy and Neo Orthodoxy, the movement directly descended from Hirsch's Frankfurt community, have combined Torah and secular knowledge with participation in contemporary Western life, and thus some maintain that there is a degree of practical and philosophical overlap between the two. The movements are nevertheless distinct, and in general, Neo-Orthodoxy has taken a more qualified approach than Modern orthodoxy, emphasizing that followers must exercise caution in engagements with the secular world.

Differences between the movements may be more than a question of degree: some Hirsch scholars argue that Hirschian philosophy is at odds with that of Modern Orthodoxy, while some Modern Orthodox scholars maintain that Modern Orthodoxy accords with Hirsch's worldview. These philosophical distinctions (though subtle), manifest in markedly divergent religious attitudes and perspectives. For example, Shimon Schwab, second rabbi of the Torah Im Derech Eretz community in the United States, has been described as being "spiritually very distant" from Yeshiva University and Modern Orthodoxy.

From the viewpoint of Neo-Orthodoxy, that movement differs from Modern Orthodoxy (and particularly Centrist Orthodoxy) on three main counts.

- The role of secular life and culture: In the Hirschian view, interaction with the secular and the requisite acquisition of culture and knowledge is encouraged, only insofar as it facilitates the application of Torah to worldly matters. For Modern Orthodoxy, on the other hand, secular culture and knowledge are seen as a complement to Torah, and, to some extent, encouraged for their own sake. Some would suggest that in Modern Orthodoxy, Judaism is enriched by interaction with modernity, whereas in Neo-Orthodoxy human experience (and modernity) are enriched by the application of Torah outlook and practice.
- Priority of Torah versus Secular knowledge: In the Hirschian view, Torah is the "sole barometer of truth" by which to judge secular disciplines, as "there is only one truth, and only one body of knowledge that can serve as the standard.... Compared to it, all the other sciences are valid only provisionally." (Hirsch, commentary to Leviticus 18:4–5; see also Rashi ad loc.). By contrast, in the view of Modern Orthodoxy, although Torah is the "preeminent center", secular knowledge is considered to offer "a different perspective that may not agree at all with [Torah] ... [but] both together present the possibility of a larger truth". (Torah Umadda, p. 236).
- Broader communal involvement: Neo-Orthodoxy, influenced by Hirsch's philosophy on Austritt (secession), "could not countenance recognition of a non-believing body as a legitimate representative of the Jewish people", and is therefore opposed to the Mizrachi movement, which is affiliated with the World Zionist Organization and the Jewish Agency. Modern Orthodoxy, on the other hand, is characterised by its involvement with the broader Jewish Community and by its Religious Zionism.

=== Religious Zionism ===
Broadly defined, Religious Zionism is a movement that embraces the idea of Jewish national sovereignty, often in connection with the belief in the ability of the Jewish people to bring about a redemptive state through natural means, and often attributing religious significance to the modern State of Israel. The spiritual thinkers who started this stream of thought include Rabbi Zvi Hirsch Kalischer (1795–1874) and Rabbi Yitzchak Yaacov Reines (1839–1915). Thus, in this sense, Religious Zionism in fact encompasses a wide spectrum of religious views including Modern Orthodoxy.

Note, however, that Modern Orthodoxy, in fact, overlaps to a large extent with "Religious Zionism" in its narrower form ("Throughout the world, a 'religious Zionist day school' is a synonym for a 'modern Orthodox day school'"). At the least, the two are not in any direct conflict, and generally coexist, sharing both values and adherents. Further, in practice, except at their extremes, the differences between Religious Zionism and Modern Orthodoxy in Israel are not pronounced, and they are often identical, especially in recent years and for the younger generation.

Nevertheless, the two movements are philosophically distinct on two broad counts.

- Firstly, (the more conservative) Religious Zionists differ with Modern Orthodoxy in its approach to secular knowledge. Here, engagement with the secular is permissible, and encouraged, but only insofar as this benefits the State of Israel; secular knowledge (or, at the least, an extensive secular education) is viewed as valuable for practical ends, though not in and of itself. See further under Torah Umadda.
- Secondly, under Religious Zionism, a "nationalistic coloration" is given to traditional religious concepts, whereas, by contrast, Modern Orthodoxy includes "a greater balance which includes openness to the non-Jewish world"; thus, under Religious Zionism, the Jewish nation is conceived of as an "organic unity", whereas Modern Orthodoxy emphasises the individual.

Applying the above distinction, in Israel today, Modern Orthodoxy—as distinct from (right-wing) Religious Zionism—is represented by only a select group of institutions: the Religious Kibbutz Movement, Ne'emanei Torah Va'Avodah, the Meimad political party, and the Shalom Hartman Institute, Yeshivat Har Etzion / Migdal Oz and Yeshivat Hamivtar/Ohr Torah Stone Institutions/Midreshet Lindenbaum (some would include Yeshivat Hesder Petach Tikva, Yeshivat Ma'ale Gilboa, and the Tzohar Foundation).

=== Conservative Judaism ===
In some areas, Modern Orthodoxy's left wing appears to align with more traditional elements of Conservative Judaism, and in fact some on the left of Modern Orthodoxy have allied with the formerly Conservative Union for Traditional Judaism. Nonetheless, the two movements are generally described as distinct. Rabbi Avi Weiss, from the left of Modern Orthodoxy, stresses that Orthodox and Conservative Judaism are "so very different in ... three fundamental areas: Torah mi-Sinai, rabbinic interpretation, and rabbinic legislation". Weiss argues as follows:

- Torah mi-Sinai ("Torah From Sinai"): Modern Orthodoxy, in line with the rest of Orthodoxy, holds that Jewish law is Divine in origin, and as such, no underlying principle may be compromised in accounting for changing political, social or economic conditions, whereas Conservative Judaism holds that Poskim should make use of literary and historical analysis in deciding Jewish law, and may reverse decisions of the Acharonim that are held to be inapplicable today.
- Rabbinic interpretation: (Modern) Orthodoxy contends that legal authority is cumulative, and that a contemporary posek (decisor) can only issue judgments based on a full history of Jewish legal precedent, whereas the implicit argument of the Conservative movement is that precedent provides illustrations of possible positions rather than binding law. Conservatism, therefore, remains free to select whichever position within the prior history appeals to it.
- Rabbinic legislation: Since the (Modern) Orthodox community is ritually observant, rabbinic law legislated by (today's) Orthodox rabbis can meaningfully become binding if accepted by the community (see minhag). Conservative Judaism, on the other hand, has a largely non-observant laity. Thus, although Conservatism similarly holds that "no law has authority unless it becomes part of the concern and practice of the community" communal acceptance of a "permissive custom" is not "meaningful", and, as a result, related rabbinic legislation cannot assume the status of law.

In general, Modern Orthodoxy does not, therefore, view the process by which the Conservative movement decides halakha as legitimate—or with the non-normative weighting assigned to halakha by the Conservative movement. In particular, Modern Orthodoxy disagrees with many of Conservative Judaism's halakhic rulings, particularly as regards issues of egalitarianism. See further on the Orthodox view and the Conservative view.

Modern Orthodoxy clearly differs from the approach of Reform Judaism and Humanistic Judaism, which do not consider halakha to be normative.

== Criticism ==
This section deals with criticism relating to standards of observance and to social issues. See "Criticism" under Torah Umadda for discussions of philosophy.

=== Standards of observance ===
There is an often repeated contention that Modern Orthodoxy—beyond its approach to chumrahs ("strictures") described above—has lower standards of observance of traditional Jewish laws and customs than other branches of Orthodox Judaism. This view is largely anecdotal, and is based on individual behaviour, as opposed to any formal, institutional position; see above re "the behaviorally modern":

There are at least two distinct types of Modern Orthodox. ... One is philosophically or ideologically modern, while the other is more appropriately characterized as behaviorally modern. ... [The] philosophically Modern Orthodox would be those who are meticulously observant of Halakhah but are, nevertheless, philosophically modern. ... The behaviorally Modern Orthodox, on the other hand, are not deeply concerned with philosophical ideas ... by and large, they define themselves as Modern Orthodox [either] in the sense that they are not meticulously observant [or] in reference to ... right-wing Orthodoxy.

[This] group is appropriately described as "modern" in the sense that those who see themselves as part of it are committed to the tradition, in general, but feel free to pick and choose in their observance of rituals. In contrast to the more traditional Orthodox, they do not observe all of the rituals as deemed obligatory by the traditional community. Their sense of "freedom of choice", although never articulated theoretically, is as evident as it is among many other contemporary Americans who view themselves as religiously traditional, but, nevertheless, are selective in their religiosity.

Additionally, whereas the Modern Orthodox position is (generally) presented as "unquestioned allegiance to the primacy of Torah, and that the apprehension of all other intellectual disciplines must be rooted and viewed through the prism of Torah", Haredi groups have sometimes compared Modern Orthodoxy with early Reform Judaism in Germany: Modern Orthodox rabbis have been criticised for attempting to modify Jewish law, in adapting Judaism to the needs of the modern world.

Note that claims of this nature have been commonplace within Orthodox Judaism since the first "reforms" of Samson Raphael Hirsch and Azriel Hildesheimer. Thus, in Europe of the early 19th century, all of Judaism that differed from the strictest forms present at the time was called "Reform". Then, as now, Modern Orthodoxy took pains to distance its "reforms", which were consistent with the Shulkhan Arukh and poskim, from those of the Reform movement (and the Conservative movement), which were not.

It is foolish to believe that it is the wording of a prayer, the notes of a synagogue tune, or the order of a special service, which form the abyss between [Reform and Orthodoxy].... It is not the so-called Divine Service which separates us, [rather it] is the theory—the principle [of faithfulness to Jewish law] ... if the Torah is to you the Law of God how dare you place another law above it and go along with God and His Law only as long as you thereby "progress" in other respects at the same time? (Religion Allied to Progress, Samson Raphael Hirsch)

=== Sociological and philosophical dilemmas ===
Some observe that the ability of Modern Orthodoxy to attract a large following and maintain its strength as a movement is inhibited by the fact that it embraces modernity—its raison d'être—and that it is highly rational and intellectual.

- Modern Orthodoxy is, almost by definition, inhibited from becoming a strong movement, because this would entail organization and authority to a degree "which goes against the very grain of modernity". A related difficulty is that Modern Orthodox rabbis who do adopt stringencies may, in the process, lose the support of precisely the "Modern" group they sought to lead. The logic: since one of the characteristics of religious orthodoxy is the submission to the authority of its tradition, the individual is expected to conform to all of its dictates, whereas modernity, by contrast, emphasizes a measure of personal autonomy as well as rationalist truth. The very term "Modern Orthodoxy" is thus, in some sense, an oxymoron.
- Modern Orthodoxy's "highly intellectual and rational stance" presents its own difficulties. Firstly, the ideology entails built-in tensions and frequently requires conscious living with inconsistency (even in the term itself: modernity vs. orthodoxy). Secondly, there are also those who question whether "the literature ... with its intellectually elitist bias fails to directly address the majority of its practitioners". The suggestion here is that Modern Orthodoxy may not provide a directly applicable theology for the contemporary Modern Orthodox family; see further discussion under Torah Umadda.
- As observed above, the (precise) "philosophical parameters of modern Orthodoxy" are not readily defined. It is posited then that "modern orthodoxy", as such, may be disappearing, "being sucked into pluralistic Judaism on the left and yeshivish on the right". "Modern orthodoxy", then, as opposed to constituting an ideological spectrum centred on a common core of values, is, in fact, (tending towards) several entirely separate movements. In fact, "[m]any are making the argument that the time has come to state the inevitable or to admit that which already has occurred: There is no longer a cohesive, singular Modern Orthodoxy. Separate rabbinical schools and separate rabbinic organizations, the argument goes, reflect the reality of a community divided." See Orthodox Judaism § Modern Orthodoxy.

== Important figures ==
Many Orthodox Jews find the intellectual engagement with the modern world as a virtue. Examples of Orthodox rabbis who promote or have promoted this worldview include:

- Yehuda Amital – A Hungarian survivor of the Holocaust, he emigrated to Israel in 1944, and resumed his yeshiva studies in Jerusalem. During the 1947–1949 Palestine war, he served in the Haganah armored corps, taking part in the battle of Latrun. Following the Six-Day War, Amital founded and led Yeshivat Har Etzion. He eventually founded the Meimad political party in Israel.
- Raymond Apple – former senior rabbi of the Great Synagogue, Sydney, Australia.
- Samuel Belkin, former President of Yeshiva University.
- Eliezer Berkovits – philosopher whose works include Not In Heaven: The Nature and Function of Halakha and Faith after the Holocaust.
- Saul Berman – director of the now defunct Edah, a Modern Orthodox advocacy organization.
- J. David Bleich, professor at Yeshiva University.
- Shalom Carmy – professor of Jewish Studies and Philosophy at Yeshiva University; theologian
- Chuck Davidson, an activist against the Chief Rabbinate of Israel, specifically in the areas of conversion and marriage, where he is creating alternatives to the official paths.
- Efrem Goldberg – Senior Rabbi at Boca Raton Synagogue in Florida, one of the largest Modern Orthodox congregations in the U.S.; speaker and writer.
- Irving Greenberg (Yitz) – theologian, lecturer, and author. A student of Joseph B. Soloveitchik, Greenberg espouses the philosophy of Tikkun Olam and has written extensively on the theological impact of the Holocaust and the creation of the state of Israel.
- David Hartman – Rabbi and founder of Shalom Hartman Institute in Jerusalem, a prominent philosopher, lecturer, and author, and a student of Rabbi Joseph B. Soloveitchik
- Leo Jung, Rabbi at the Jewish Center (Manhattan, New York)
- Norman Lamm – Rosh Yeshiva, Yeshiva University; Orthodox Forum; author of Torah U-Maddah.
- Aharon Lichtenstein – the son-in-law of Joseph Soloveitchik, in 1971 he joined Yehuda Amital as leader of Yeshivat Har Etzion. Author of Leaves of Faith: The World of Jewish Learning, and By His Light: Character and Values in the Service of God.
- Haskel Lookstein – Rabbi of Congregation Kehilath Jeshurun in Manhattan and principal of the Ramaz School. Voted by Newsweek magazine as the most influential orthodox rabbi in the United States in 2008. Rabbi Lookstein is best known for his strong political activism, which began with numerous visits to the former Soviet Union, numerous rallies on behalf of Natan Sharansky and continues today with activism on behalf of the Jews of Israel and worldwide.
- Shlomo Riskin – formerly rabbi of the Lincoln Square Synagogue in Manhattan, he emigrated to Israel to become the Chief Rabbi of Efrat.
- Michael Rosensweig – Rosh Yeshiva at the Rabbi Isaac Elchanan Theological Seminary of Yeshiva University and the Rosh Kollel of the Beren Kollel Elyon
- Jonathan Sacks, philosopher and theologian, author of 25 books, and previous Chief Rabbi of the Commonwealth; see esp. #Torah v'Chokhma there, re Modern Orthodoxy.
- Hershel Schachter – one of Joseph B. Soloveitchik's students, dean of the Katz Kollel at the Yeshiva University-affiliated Rabbi Isaac Elchanan Theological Seminary (RIETS). Has published several works establishing a definitive view of Soloveitchik's Weltanschauung.
- Joseph B. Soloveitchik – known as "The Rav", he was an important figure in Modern Orthodoxy in mid-20th century America. He wrote The Lonely Man of Faith and Halakhic Man, and was an outspoken Zionist, an opponent of extending rabbinic authority into areas of secular expertise, and a proponent of some interdenominational cooperation, such as the Rabbinical Council of America's participation in the now-defunct Synagogue Council of America.
- Gedalia Dov Schwartz – scholar and posek in Chicago, Illinois. From 1991 to 2020, he was the av beis din (head of the rabbinical court) of both the Beth Din of America and the Chicago Rabbinical Council.
- Moshe David Tendler – Professor of Jewish Medical Ethics, and of Biology, as well as Rosh Yeshiva in Yeshivat Rav Yitzchak Elchanan (MYP/RIETS). Holding a Ph.D. in Microbiology, Rav Tendler was a student of rabbis Moshe Feinstein, (his father-in-law) and Yosef Dov Soloveitchik. Tendler is an expert on medical ethics as it pertains to Jewish law. He is the author of Practical Medical Halakhah, a textbook of Jewish responsa to medical issues, and Pardes Rimonim, a book about the halakhot of Taharat Mishpacha, and is rabbi of the Community Synagogue in Monsey, New York, and the chairman of the Bioethical Commission, RCA, and of the Medical Ethics Task Force, UJA-Federation of Greater New York.
- Joseph Telushkin – author, teacher, lecturer
- Marc B. Shapiro – author, lecturer
- Stanley M. Wagner – American rabbi and academic
- Mordechai Willig – Rosh yeshiva and Rosh Kollel at Yeshiva University; Rabbi of Young Israel of Riverdale
- Joel B. Wolowelsky – Yeshiva of Flatbush; Orthodox Forum; Tradition
- Walter Wurzburger – editor of Tradition magazine, and head of the Rabbinical Council of America
- Pinchas Polonsky – Jewish-religious philosopher, researcher, and educator active among the Russian-speaking Jewish community.

== Modern Orthodox advocacy groups ==
There are a few organizations dedicated to furthering Modern Orthodoxy as a religious trend:

- The largest and oldest are the Orthodox Union (Union of Orthodox Jewish Congregations of America), which sponsors youth groups, kashrut supervision, and many other activities, and its rabbinic counterpart, the Rabbinical Council of America (RCA). Both have Israel and diaspora (outside the land of Israel) programs.

Others include:

- The Jewish Orthodox Feminist Alliance (JOFA): a forum for enhancing the roles of Orthodox Jewish women within the Orthodox community, and reducing Orthodox religious disabilities against women.
- Ne'emanei Torah Va'Avodah is a non-profit organization operating in Israel whose proposed goal is "To forge a more open and tolerant discourse in Religious Zionism, one that integrates a halachic lifestyle with active engagement in Israeli society, in order to strengthen tolerance, equality, and social responsibility".

== See also ==
- Bar-Ilan University
- Hebrew Theological College
- Jerusalem College of Technology
- Open Orthodoxy
- Orthodox Judaism
- Religious Zionism
- Touro College
- Yeshiva University
