= Center for Jewish–Christian Understanding and Cooperation =

Educational institution in Israel

The Center for Jewish-Christian Understanding and Cooperation
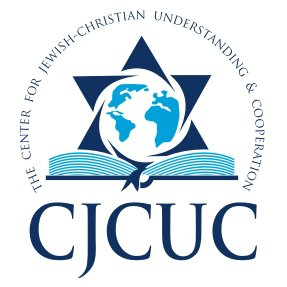
- Abbreviation: CJCUC
- Formation: 2008; 18 years ago
- Founders: Rabbi Dr. Shlomo Riskin; David Nekrutman
- Location: Jerusalem
- Services: Jewish–Christian relations & Bible study center
- Chancellor: Rabbi Kenneth Brander
- Executive director: David Nekrutman
- Director Central Europe: Rabbi Josh Ahrens
- Parent organization: Ohr Torah Stone
- Website: www.cjcuc.org

The Center for Jewish–Christian Understanding and Cooperation (CJCUC) is an educational institution at which Christians who tour Israel can study the Hebrew Bible with Orthodox rabbis and learn about the Hebraic roots of Christianity. The center was established in Efrat in 2008 by Rabbi Shlomo Riskin, who has been described as "the most prominent rabbinic spokesperson to Christian Zionists". CJCUC partners with major Christian interfaith organizations such as Christians United for Israel and the International Christian Embassy Jerusalem. Since Riskin's retirement as president of Ohr Torah Stone in 2018, the overseeing of all CJCUC activities has been turned over to David Nekrutman who has served as the center's chief director since its inception.

== History ==
The ideological groundwork that led to the eventual establishment of CJCUC in 2008 began to take shape almost 50 years beforehand. In 1964, Rabbi Joseph B. Soloveitchik, the teacher and mentor of CJCUC's Chancellor and Founder, Shlomo Riskin, published an essay entitled "Confrontation" in which he expounded his views on interfaith dialogue and drew out guidelines which permitted such a dialogue and, in the view of Riskin, not only permitted it but rendered it necessary.

At around the same time, fundamental ideological shifts were forming within the ranks of the Catholic Church, and a year after Soloveitchik's essay was published, The Holy See issued Nostra aetate, the Declaration on the Relation of the Church with Non-Christian Religions. Nostra aetate absolved the Jews from the crucifixion of Jesus, and admitted that religious antisemitism had a significant role in laying the foundation for the atrocities perpetrated against the Jewish people.

Riskin's academic plunge into Jewish–Christian relations began in the early 1960s when he attended seminars, held by David Flusser, about the Christian Gospels at The Hebrew University of Jerusalem. As an Orthodox Jew, he could pinpoint the parallels for Jesus' teachings within the Hebrew scripture.

After settling in Efrat, Riskin began to engage with the Christian world. Most of the Christian visitors to Efrat, those who came to hear and learn, were Evangelicals. He formed relations with Rev. Robert Stearns of Eagles' Wings and with Pastor John Hagee.

Since Riskin's retirement as president of Ohr Torah Stone institutions in 2018, the overseeing of all CJCUC activities has been turned over to David Nekrutman who has served as the center's chief director since its inception.

== Activities ==
=== Hebraic Bible study ===
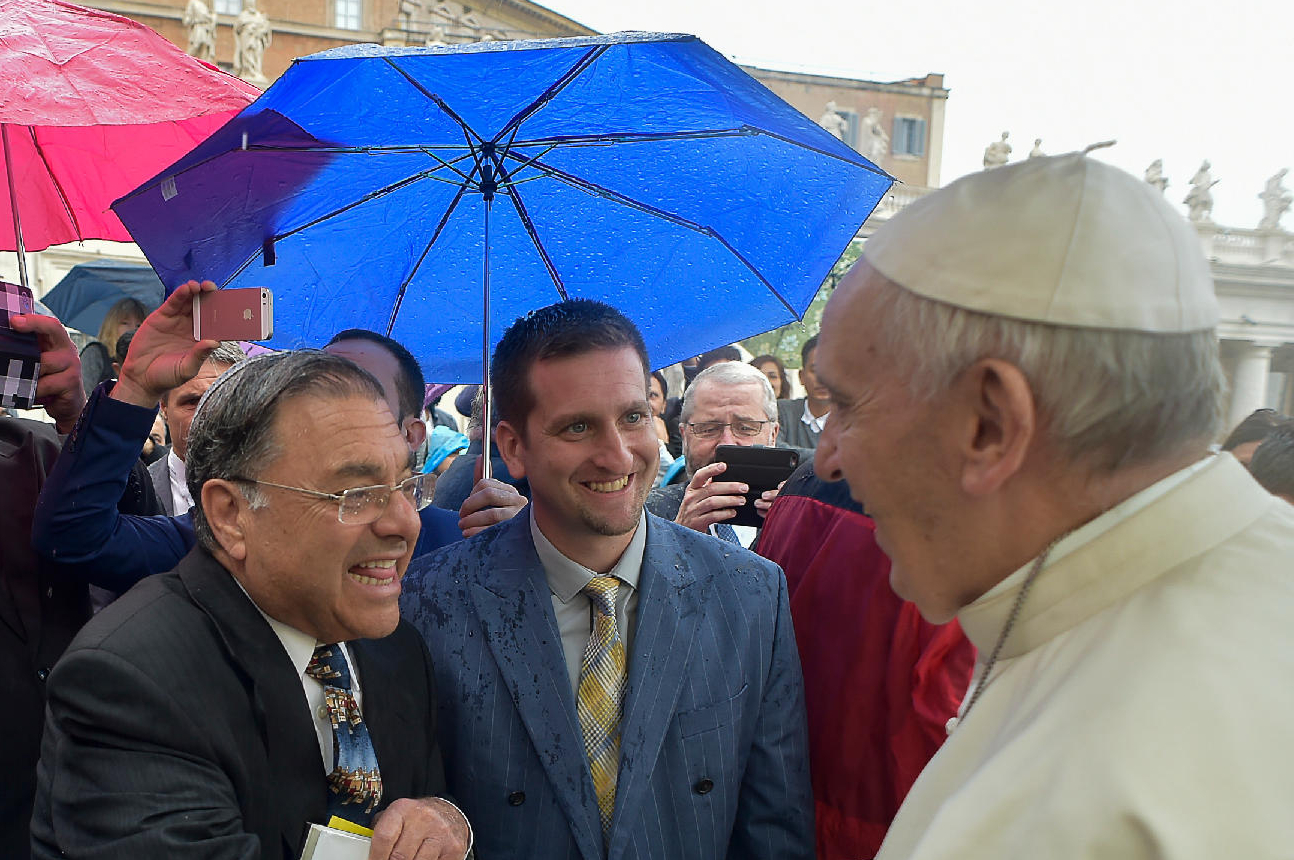
CJCUC Chancellor & Founder, Rabbi Shlomo Riskin, and CJCUC Executive Director, David Nekrutman, meet with Pope Francis in Rome, Italy, 26 October 2016

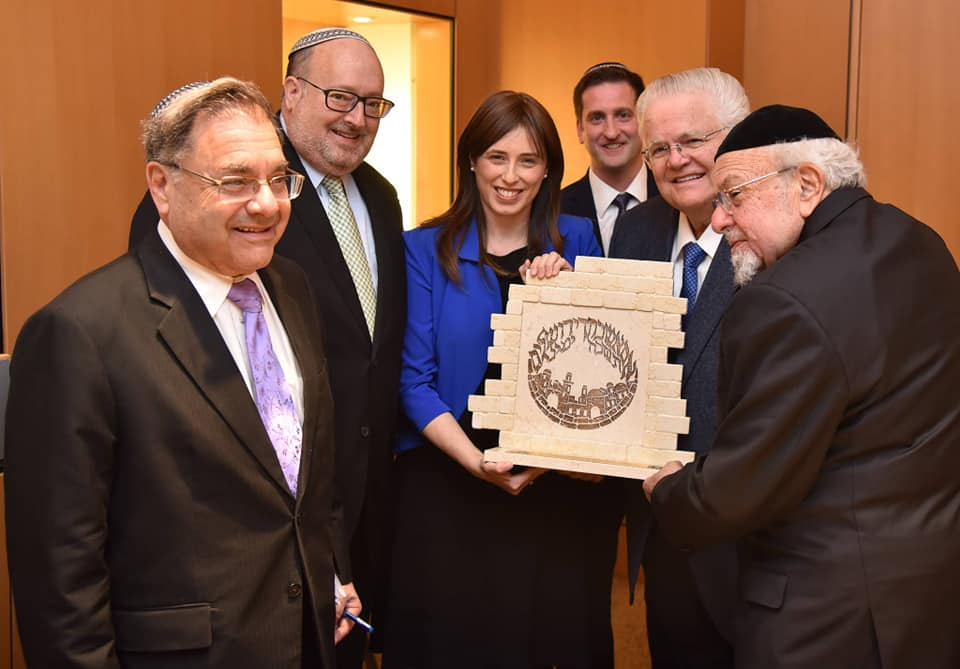
CJCUC Founder, Rabbi Shlomo Riskin, CJCUC Chancellor, Rabbi Kenneth Brander, CJCUC Executive Director, David Nekrutman, Pastor John Hagee and Rabbi Aryeh Scheinberg with Israeli Deputy Foreign Minister, Tzipi Hotovely, at an event held in honor of Rabbi Aryeh Scheinberg at the Israeli Ministry of Foreign Affairs, 11 November 2018

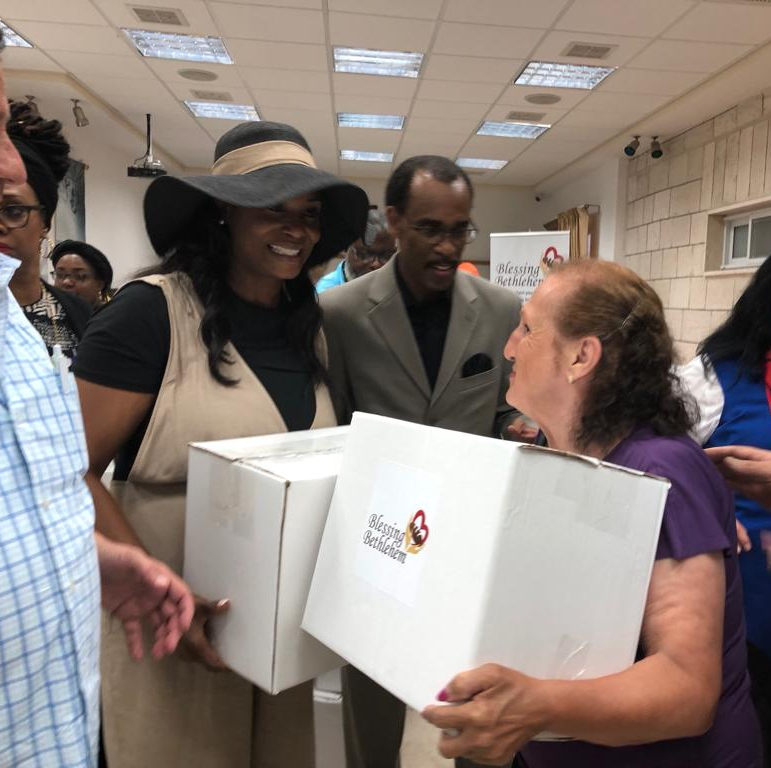
COGIC Bishop of Israel, Glenn Plummer, and First Lady Pauline Plummer handing out Food Care Packages as part of the center's "Blessing Bethlehem" initiative to help the persecuted Christian community living in Bethlehem, 24 July 2019

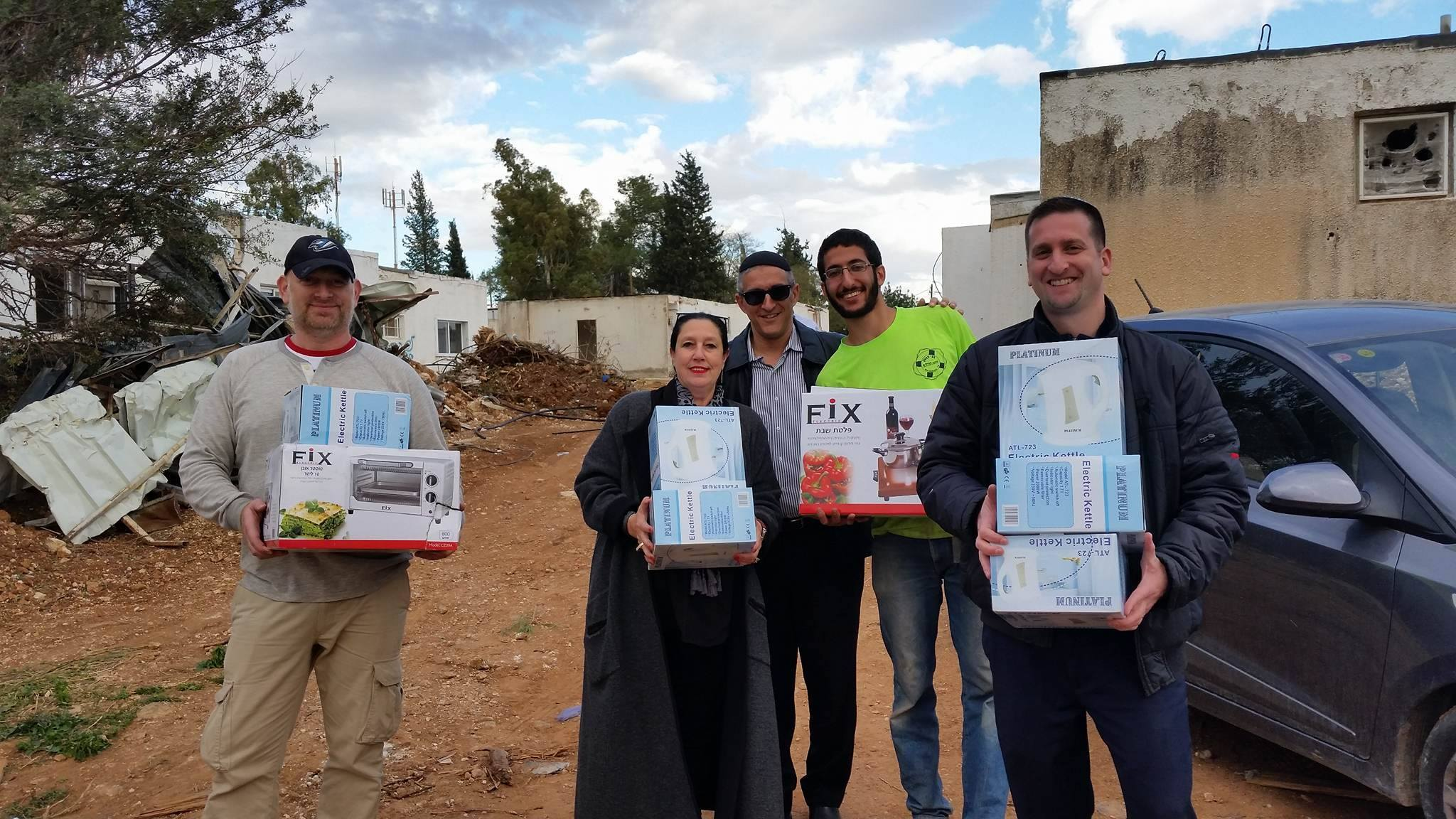
CJCUC Executive Director, David Nekrutman, Former Associate Director, Pesach Wolicki, and staff aiding the community of Halamish in an international relief effort carried out by the center, after a series of arson attacks throughout Israel the week before left many homeless, 30 November 2016.

CJCUC hosts Christian groups from all over the world for all-day seminars, which include tours of biblical sites such as nearby Jerusalem, the Path of the Patriarchs and the Herodian wells. Among the subjects that the seminar series includes are Jewish–Christian Relations; the Theology of Biblical Holidays; Covenant and Mission; The Ten Commandments; Satan, Evil and Free Will; Judaism and the Ministry of Jesus; and Human Life Created in the Image of God.

The center runs educational seminars for students and faculty of Catholic and Protestant seminaries in the United States, Canada, and Europe. It has appointed North American and European directors to coordinate relations with religious leaders on these continents.

CJCUC has established a Theological Think Tank, the Institute for Theological Inquiry (ITI), headed by Rabbi Eugene Korn and Robert Jenson of the Witherspoon Institute, which consists of international scholars and theologians whose tasks are to clarify areas of Jewish and Christian theological agreement and disagreement, as well as identify areas of fruitful cooperation. The topics focus on past and present Jewish–Christian Relations, Covenant, Salvation, Biblical Hermeneutics, Religion and Violence, Ethical Monotheism, and Messianism.

In May 2011, CJCUC facilitated and sponsored a Yale University student group consisting of Orthodox Jewish and Evangelical Christians to learn the fundamentals of Jewish–Christian relations.

In March 2012, CJCUC took Latin American priests and rabbis to learn the fundamentals of Jewish–Catholic relations in the backdrop of the Holy Land.

In June 2012, CJCUC partnered with Christians United for Israel to bring 30 Evangelical pastors from the U.S. to learn the fundamentals of Jewish–Christian relations.

In February 2013, CJCUC co-sponsored the visit of more than 160 pastors to Israel through the Christians United for Israel organization.

In January 2015, CJCUC founder, Rabbi Shlomo Riskin along with CJCUC's Executive Director, David Nekrutman, addressed a group of 400 pastors and rabbis at a symposium held in Broward County, Florida.

In February 2015, on a visit to Oklahoma, Rabbi Riskin unveiled plans for historic high school curricula, being worked on in a joint effort with the government of Israel, detailing advancements in Jewish–Christian relations.

In July 2016, CJCUC announced that it was moving its center of operations from Efrat to the Bible Lands Museum in Jerusalem.

CJCUC has received funds from Israel's Hertog family, Paul Singer Foundation, Zion's Gate International Foundation, Ministry of Justice, and John Hagee Ministries.

=== Day to Praise ===
In October 2014, Riskin became the first Orthodox rabbi to invite Christian visitors to Israel to participate in a "praise rally" with Jewish interfaith leaders at the Center's headquarters during the holiday of Sukkot. For Sukkot 2012, he hosted a seminar for Christian visitors.

In March 2015, he launched the Day to Praise global initiative calling out to Christians worldwide to join him in reciting Hallel (Psalms 113–118) to praise God on Yom Ha'atzmaut (Israel's Independence Day).

Later that year, in 2015, during the festival of Sukkot, CJCUC, together with its founder, Rabbi Shlomo Riskin, the chief rabbi of Efrat, hosted an interfaith event in Efrat in which 200 Christians and Jews came together to sing the praises of God in unity. Riskin said that "the prayer event will help usher in the Messianic Age."

=== Blessing Bethlehem ===
CJCUC created the first food voucher program to help financially disadvantaged Christian Arabs living in the Land.

In September 2016, the center launched the "Blessing Bethlehem" fundraising initiative at the LifeLight Festival in Sioux Falls, South Dakota in and effort to create a food giveaway program for persecuted Christians in Bethlehem and the surrounding area.

=== Social activism ===
In October 2013, CJCUC Executive Director, David Nekrutman published a controversial appeal for funds from Jews to support the purchase of a permanent site for the Christian-Arab church of Pastor Steven Khoury.

In May 2014, CJCUC sponsored an interfaith Latin American clergy mission that visited the Ziv Medical Center in Safed, Israel, donating supplies to wounded Syrian civil war refugees.

In a September 2015 piece for The Times of Israel, Executive Director, David Nekrutman appealed to the Israeli Ministry of Education in regards to budget cuts and equal funding for Christian Schools in Israel citing these budget cuts as "collateral damage" of internal political issues and stating that these issues "should never oppress minority populations". Later, together with the Pave the Way Foundation (PTWF) and the Galilee Center for Studies in Jewish-Christian Relations (CSJCR), CJCUC initiated an international campaign urging the Israeli Prime Minister and Education Ministry to Save Christian Education.

== Accomplishments ==
CJCUC accomplishments include:

- In January 2012, CJCUC received the honorary title of Goodwill Ambassador for Jewish–Christian Relations from Prime Minister Benjamin Netanyahu. In his letter, the prime minister writes: "I believe you are uniquely suited to be an Ambassador of Goodwill for the State of Israel to strengthen relations between Jews and Christians throughout the world. I know that you will continue to promote understanding between Jews and Christians in a spirit of mutual respect that will enable both to work together to better mankind."
- CJCUC is on the official body between the Holy See and the Jewish people via IJCIC. In January 2011, Riskin had an audience with Pope Benedict XVI, and in June 2013, CJCUC's Academic Director Rabbi Eugene Korn, along with other members of the organized Jewish establishment, met with Pope Francis.
- CJCUC's Executive Director, David Nekrutman, was accepted into the Oral Roberts University online Graduate Theology program, the first Orthodox Jew to do so. In 2011 Nekrutman spoke to Korean Christians at a pro-Israel rally held in Seoul. Nekrutman was the first Orthodox Jew to speak at the Church of God in Christ (COGIC) conference and discuss the importance of visiting Israel. In April 2012, he was the main speaker at CUFI's first international event in Nairobi where over 1,500 Africans attended to support Israel.

== Orthodox Rabbinic Statement on Christianity ==
On 3 December 2015, CJCUC spearheaded a petition of orthodox rabbis from around the world calling for increased partnership between Jews and Christians.

The unprecedented statement, entitled "To Do the Will of Our Father in Heaven: Toward a Partnership between Jews and Christians", was initially signed by over 25 prominent Orthodox rabbis in Israel, United States, and Europe.

The real importance of this Orthodox statement is that it calls for fraternal partnership between Jewish and Christian religious leaders, while also acknowledging the positive theological status of the Christian faith. Jews and Christians must be in the forefront of teaching basic moral values to the world.

— Rabbi Shlomo Riskin, Vatican Radio

The statement cites traditional opinions by past rabbinic authorities to justify partnership with Christians and religious appreciation of Christianity.

We understand that there is room in traditional Judaism to see Christianity as part of God's covenantal plan for humanity, as a development out of Judaism that was willed by God.

— Rabbi Irving Greenberg, Vatican Radio

In May 2017, the statement was approbated by Rabbi Abraham Skorka of Argentina and Cardinal Christoph Schönborn, Archbishop of Vienna.

== Publications ==
- "Covenant and Hope—Christian and Jewish Reflections" (Eerdmans, 2012) ISBN 978-0802867049
- "Plowshares into Swords? Reflections on Religion and Violence" (2014) (Kindle Edition) ASIN B00P11EGOE
- "RETURNING TO ZION: CHRISTIAN AND JEWISH PERSPECTIVES" (2015) (Kindle Edition) ASIN B014J6S4NU
- "Cup of Salvation: A Powerful Journey Through King David's Psalms of Praise" (Gefen Publishing, 2017) ISBN 978-9652299352

== Staff ==
- Rabbi Shlomo Riskin, Founder
- Rabbi Kenneth Brander, Chancellor
- David Nekrutman, Executive Director
- Rabbi Josh Ahrens, Director Central Europe
- Rabbi Pesach Wolicki, Associate Director (2015–2019)
- Rabbi Angel Kreiman-Brill (1945–2014), Latin American director
- Limor Riskin, Director of Operations

== See also ==
- Blessing Bethlehem
- Day to Praise
- Munther Isaac
- Ohr Torah Stone
