= David Nekrutman =

Jewish theologian

- דוד נקרוטמן
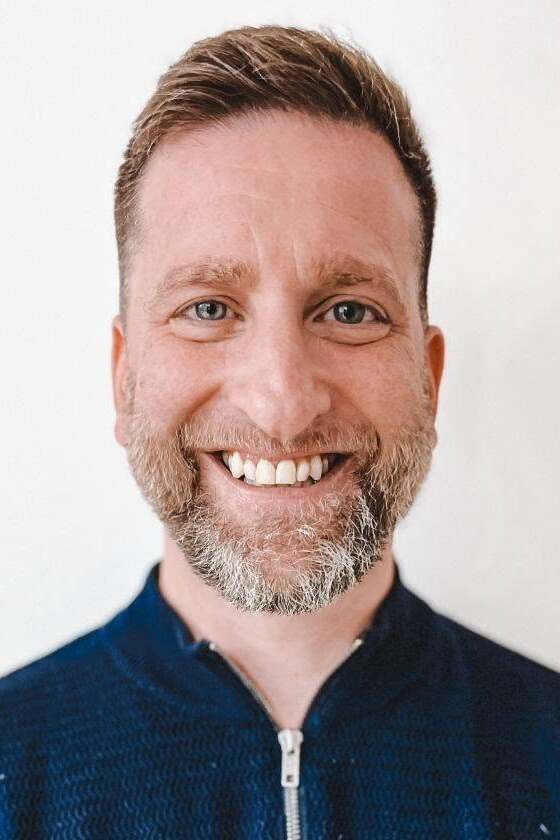
- David Nekrutman, 2026
- Born: 28 November 1973 (age 52); Brooklyn, New York
- Education: Judaic–Christian Studies (M.A.); Social work (MSW); Forensic psychology (B.A.)
- Alma mater: Oral Roberts University; University of Pennsylvania; John Jay College of Criminal Justice
- Occupations: theologian writer director public speaker columnist
- Organizations: The Isaiah Projects; Blessing Bethlehem; Day to Praise; CJCUC
- Parent(s): Natalie Bell; Allen Nekrutman
- Relatives: Joseph Nekrutman (brother)

David Nekrutman (Hebrew: דוד נקרוטמן; born 28 November 1973) is an American-Israeli Orthodox Jewish theologian, writer, director, columnist, public speaker, and pro-Israel activist. He is a prominent figure and pioneer in the world of Jewish-Christian relations and is the co-founder and executive director of The Isaiah Projects, a ministry dedicated to helping Christians discover the Hebraic roots of their faith. He is the former executive director and co-founder of the Center for Jewish-Christian Understanding and Cooperation (CJCUC), co-founder of the Day to Praise global interfaith initiative, and founder of the Blessing Bethlehem aid organization. In addition, Nekrutman is a columnist who has written for The Jerusalem Post, Charisma Magazine, and The Times of Israel.

== Biography ==
=== Early life ===
David Nekrutman was born on 28 November 1973 in Brooklyn, New York, to Natalie (née Bell) and Allen Nekrutman. He is the younger brother of Joseph Nekrutman. Throughout his elementary and high-school years, Nekrutman attended a Yeshiva, where he adorned, in his words, "a black hat", which is significant of the ultra-Orthodox Jewish denomination.

=== Education ===
Nekrutman holds a Bachelor of Arts degree in forensic psychology from John Jay College of Criminal Justice, and a Master of Social Work from the University of Pennsylvania.

In 2013, Nekrutman was accepted into Oral Roberts University's theology program, taking a Master of Arts in Biblical Literature, with a concentration in Judaic–Christian Studies.

In May 2018, Nekrutman became the first Orthodox Jew to graduate from Oral Roberts University with a master's degree in Christian Studies.

== Jewish-Christian relations ==
In the early 2000s, prior to his work with CJCUC, Nekrutman served initially as Director of Political Affairs, and later on as Director of Christian Affairs, for the Consulate General of Israel in New York, a position he acquired after attending a Christian "Night to Celebrate Israel" event at a local community church in Brooklyn. Initially, it was Nekrutman's boss at the consulate, Alon Pinkas, who was intended to take part in the event, but an emergency situation in Israel at the time prevented him from going, and he asked Nekrutman to take his place. After placing a call to his rabbi, Gerald Meister, Nekrutman received the necessary dispensation to attend the event at the church. After attending the event, Nekrutman was later approached by Pinkas and his director of media affairs, Ido Aharoni, and informed that they are changing his portfolio from Director of Political Affairs to Director of Christian Affairs. After hesitation in regards to whether or not he wanted to accept the position, Nekrutman turned once again to Rabbi Meister, who told him that he had been entrusted with a sacred responsibility, and that he could go by way of two paths: "Covenant Theology", in which both Jewish and Christian communities believe they are covenanted; or by way of a "Kodak Moment", and get his picture taken in the paper. Meister told Nekrutman that he preferred he go by way of the first option. Nekrutman eventually accepted the position. While serving as Director of Christian Affairs, he was instrumental in the launching of The Day of Prayer for the Peace of Jerusalem, The Israel Experience, The Christian Jerusalem Day Banquet, and The Watchman on the Wall program with Reverend Robert Stearns of Eagles' Wings, resulting in millions of Christians praying for and supporting Israel and the Jewish people.

In March 2022, Nekrutman published Your Sabbath Invitation: Partnership in God's Ultimate Celebration, a book in which he expounds on the origins and history of The Sabbath and its role in biblical prophecy.

In 2023, Nekrutman was appointed as an adviser for the television series "The Chosen" about the life and ministry of Jesus of Nazareth.

=== CJCUC ===
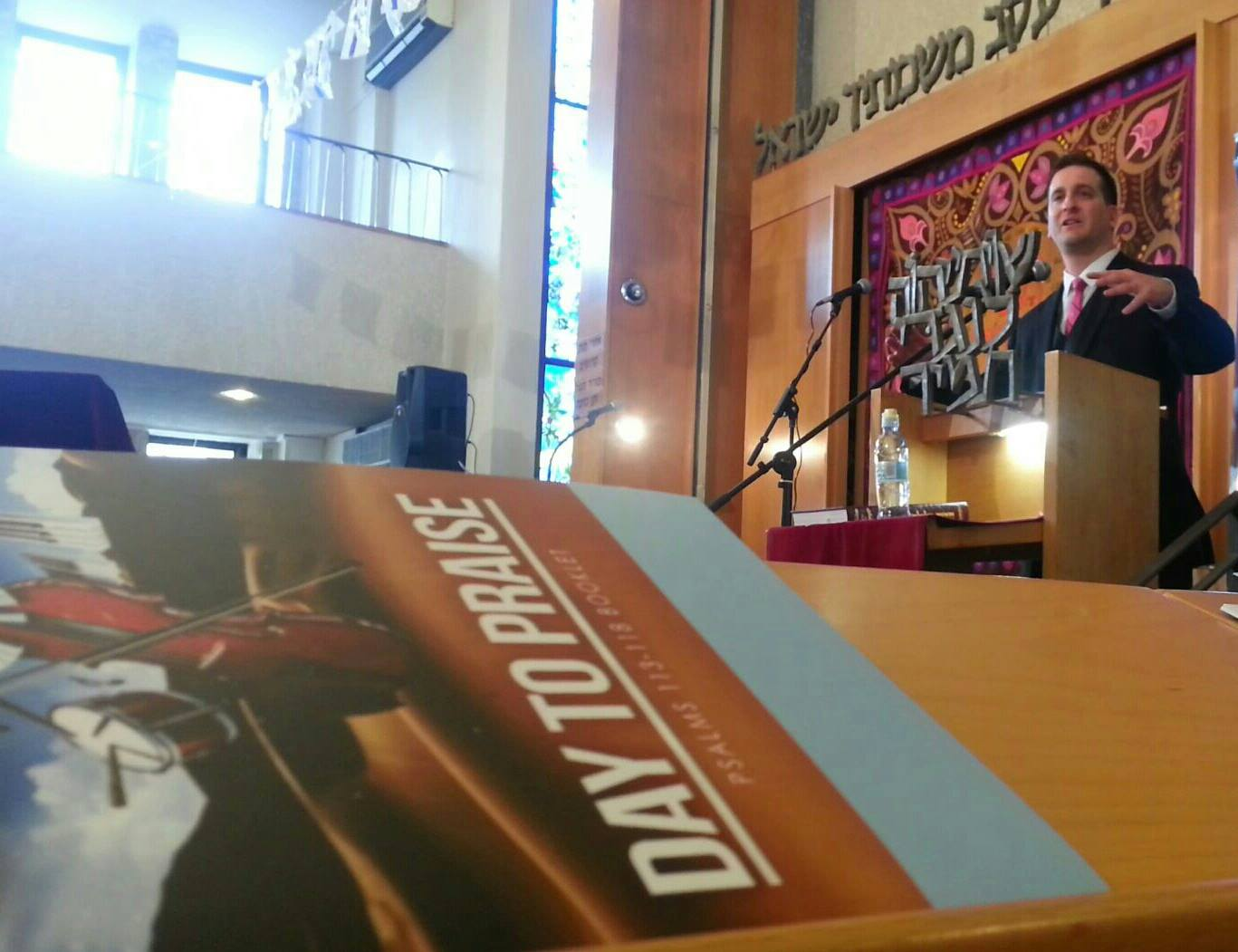
David Nekrutman, speaking at the central Day to Praise event at "HaZvi Israel" synagogue in Jerusalem, 23 April 2015.

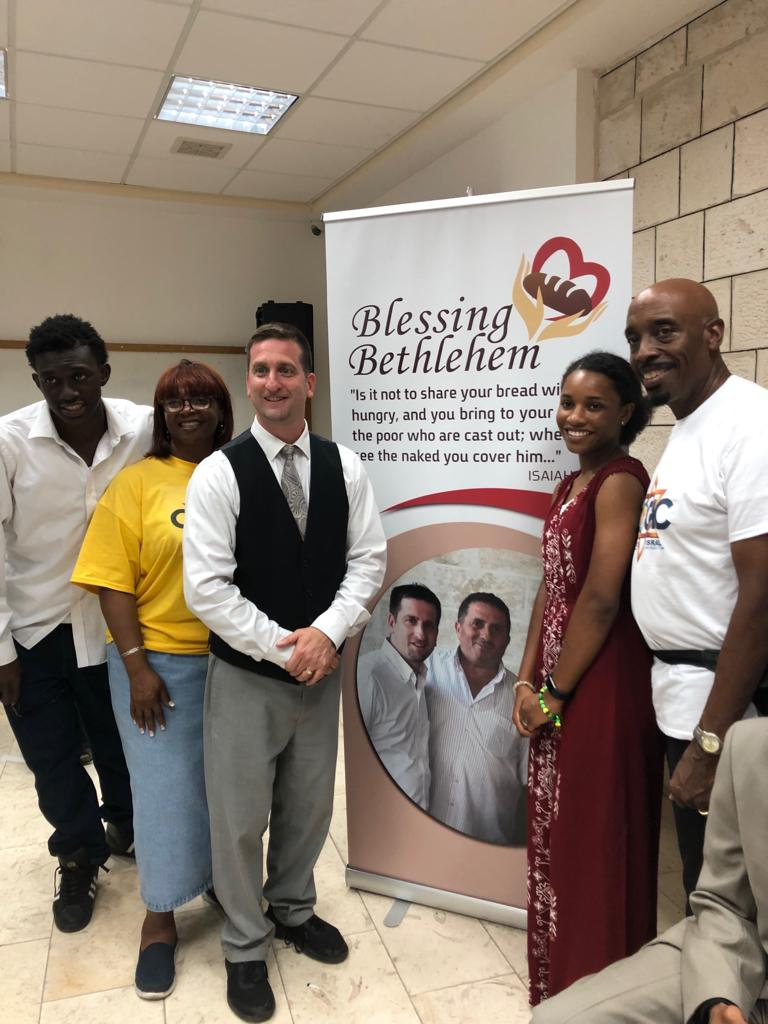
David Nekrutman with Blessing Bethlehem volunteers, 2019

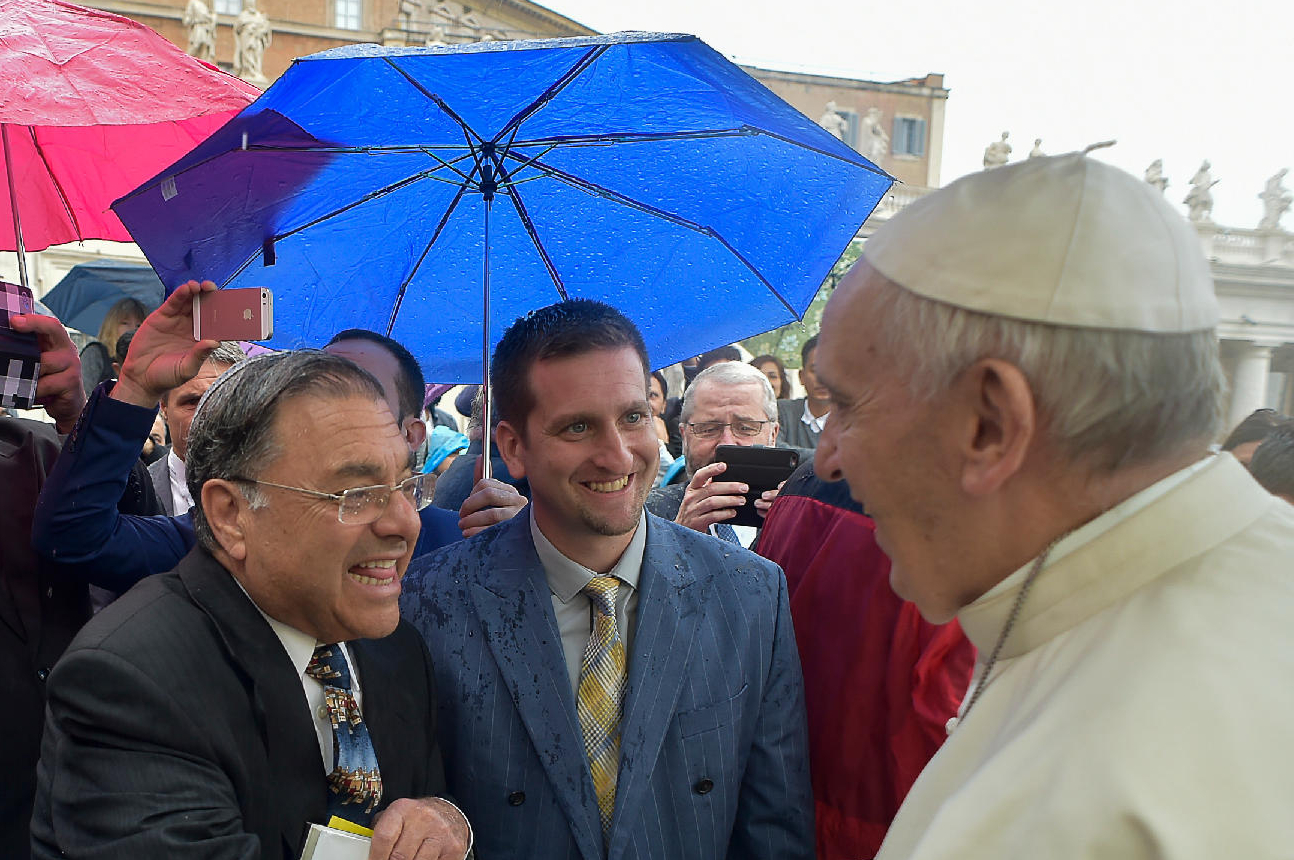
CJCUC Chancellor & Founder, Rabbi Shlomo Riskin, and CJCUC Executive Director, David Nekrutman, meet with Pope Francis in Rome, Italy, 26 October 2016

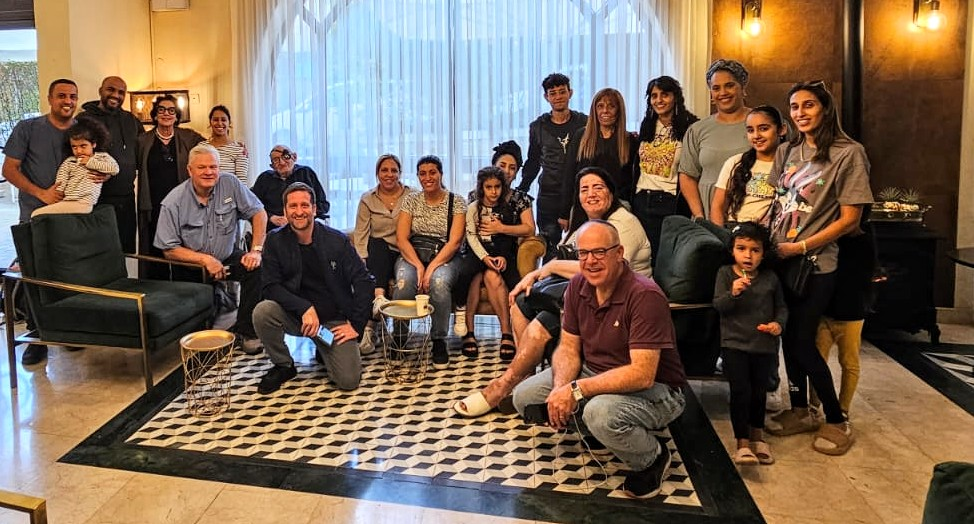
Nekrutman, as executive director of The Isaiah Projects, with evacuees from Moshav Mash'en during the Gaza war, 16 October 2023

Between 2008 and 2021, Nekrutman, under the auspice of Rabbi Shlomo Riskin, headed The Center for Jewish-Christian Understanding and Cooperation, or CJCUC, an educational institution at which Christians who tour Israel can study the Hebrew Bible with Orthodox rabbis and learn about the Hebraic roots of Christianity. The center was established in Efrat in 2008 by Riskin, who has developed a reputation as "the most prominent rabbinic spokesperson to Christian Zionists". CJCUC partners with major Christian interfaith organizations such as Christians United for Israel and the International Christian Embassy Jerusalem. Its mission is rooted in Isaiah 1:18: "Come now, let us reason together, says the Lord."

In 2011, Nekrutman spoke to Korean Christians at a pro-Israel rally held in Seoul. Nekrutman was the first Orthodox Jew to speak at the Church of God in Christ (COGIC) conference and discuss the importance of visiting Israel. In April 2012, he was the main speaker at CUFI's first international event in Nairobi, where over 1,500 Africans attended to support Israel.

In 2013, Nekrutman, was accepted into the Oral Roberts University online Graduate Theology program.

In October 2013, Nekrutman published a controversial appeal for funds from Jews to support the purchase of a permanent site for the Christian-Arab church of Pastor Steven Khoury.

In a September 2015 piece for The Times of Israel, Nekrutman appealed to the Israeli Ministry of Education in regards to budget cuts and equal funding for Christian schools in Israel, citing these budget cuts as "collateral damage" of internal political issues and stating that these issues "should never oppress minority populations". Later, together with The Pave the Way Foundation (PTWF) and the Galilee Center for Studies in Jewish-Christian Relations (CSJCR), CJCUC initiated an international campaign urging the Israeli Prime Minister and Education Ministry to Save Christian Education.

Since Rabbi Shlomo Riskin's retirement as president of Ohr Torah Stone in 2018, Nekrutman has taken over as head of all CJCUC activities.

On June 13, 2021, Nekrutman was recognized as a Goodwill Ambassador for Jewish-Christian Relations by the Israeli Ministry of Foreign Affairs Department of World Religions.

In September 2021, Nekrutman ended his fourteen-year tenure as executive director of CJCUC and later continued his life-long calling in the field of Jewish-Christian relations.

=== Day to Praise ===
In April 2015, Nekrutman along with CJCUC Chancellor and Founder, Rabbi Shlomo Riskin, launched the Day to Praise global initiative. The initiative takes to form in an annual event on Yom Ha'atzmaut (Israel's Independence Day) in which Christians world-wide are called on and invited by Rabbi Riskin to recite Hallel (Psalms 113–118) with the Jewish People in a celebration to praise God for the State of Israel.

=== Blessing Bethlehem ===
In the autumn of 2016, Nekrutman along with CJCUC associate director, Rabbi Pesach Wolicki, founded Blessing Bethlehem, an initiative with the purpose of providing humanitarian aid to the persecuted and impoverished Christian Arabs of Bethlehem and the surrounding communities.

=== The Isaiah Projects ===
In 2022, Nekrutman, along with Janet Cain, Pastor Donna Taylor, and Marsha Conrad founded The Isaiah Projects, a ministry dedicated to helping Christians discover the Hebraic roots of their faith. The organization focuses on three main topics; The first is Shabbat (The Sabbath) as a movement, its fulfillment of Messianic Prophecy and how it can be adopted and incorporated into one's life. The second is creating written resources about the Hebraic roots of Christianity. And the third is providing food packages and humanitarian aid to those in need.

== Books ==
- Nekrutman, David (2022). Your Sabbath Invitation: Partnership in God's Ultimate Celebration. The Isaiah Projects. ISBN 978-0578262512.
- Nekrutman, David (2024). Your Sabbath Invitation: Decoding Scripture Using Ancient Hebraic Methods - Home Bible Fellowship Study. The Isaiah Projects. ISBN 979-8321221310.
- Nekrutman, David (2025). Biblical Excavations Volume 1: For Such A Time: A Study of Esther 4:14 & The Greatest Commandment. The Isaiah Projects. ISBN 979-8310076853.
- Nekrutman, David (2025). Biblical Excavations Volume 2: First Fruits: A Thanksgiving Study & My Book Of Hebrew Letters. The Isaiah Projects. ISBN 979-8312729498.

== Personal life ==
From 2006 to 2013, Nekrutman worked in e-marketing for a major high-tech company in Israel.
