= Pesach Wolicki =

Israeli-Canadian educator, writer and columnist

Rabbi Pesach Wolicki פסח ווליצקי
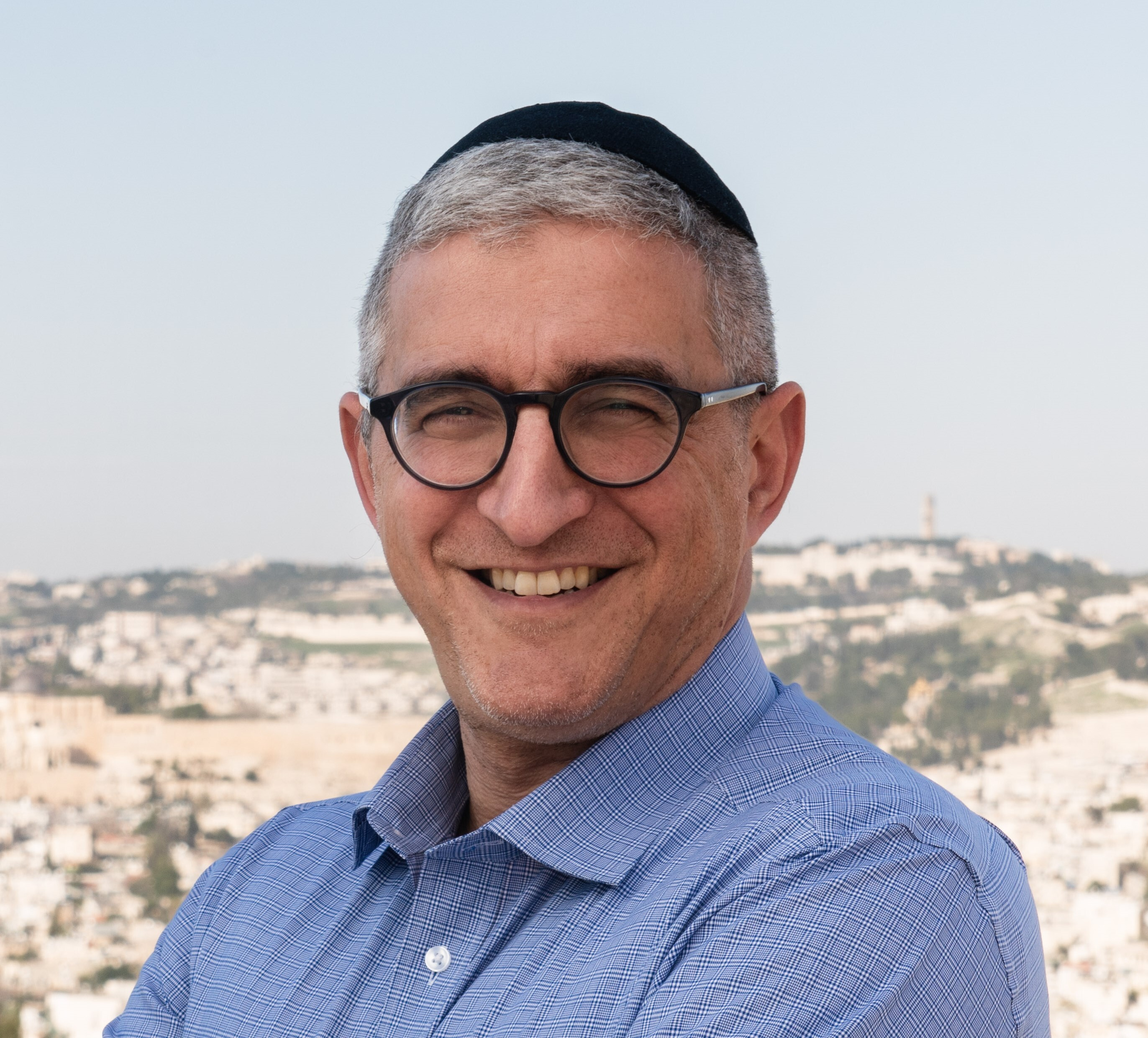
- Wolicki in 2022

Personal life
- Born: 5 February 1970 (age 56) Ohio, U.S.
- Parents: Jerome B. Wolicki (father); Marsha Wolicki Dubow (mother)
- Education: Yeshivat Kerem B'Yavneh

Religious life
- Religion: Judaism
- Denomination: Religious Zionism
- Residence: Bet Shemesh
- Semikhah: Chief Rabbinate of Jerusalem

Pesach Wolicki (Hebrew: פסח ווליצקי; born 5 February 1970) is an Orthodox Jewish Rabbi, writer, columnist, lecturer, public speaker and religious Zionism activist. In previous positions, he served as the rosh yeshiva at Yeshivat Yesodei HaTorah from 2003 to 2015 and as the associate director of the Center for Jewish-Christian Understanding and Cooperation (CJCUC) from 2015 to 2019. He is a columnist for The Jerusalem Post, The Times of Israel, Charisma News, and Breaking News Israel and is an outspoken voice regarding Jewish-Christian interfaith relations.

He is executive director of Israel365 Action, an initiative to educate Christians and Jews of Biblical faith about current events in Israel. He also hosts Eyes on Israel, a weekly 1 hour news magazine show. He is co-host of the Shoulder to Shoulder podcast, with pastor Doug Reed. Wolicki is a regular opinion writer for The Jerusalem Post and Israel365news.com.

From September 2021 to December 2023, Wolicki served as executive director of the Center for Jewish-Christian Understanding and Cooperation. From June 2015 to July 2019 he served as its associate director.

Wolicki has appeared on TV and radio programs including Steve Bannon's War Room, Human Events Daily, In the Line of Fire with Michael L. Brown and Today's Issues with Protestant fundamentalist Tim Wildmon. He is a regular contributor to Securing America with Frank Gaffney and American Family Radio's Middle East Report.

== Biography ==
Wolicki was born in Ohio on February 5, 1970 to Marsha (née Dubow) and Rabbi Jerome B. Wolicki. During his early childhood years, he lived in Canada.

In 1994, Wolicki made aliyah to Israel. He lives with his wife and eight children in Bet Shemesh.

=== Education ===
Wolicki studied at Yeshivat Kerem B'Yavneh and later became a fellow at Darche Noam Kollel. He received his semicha (rabbinical ordination) from the Chief Rabbinate of Jerusalem. He was ordained by Chief Rabbi Itzhak Kolitz.

=== Career ===
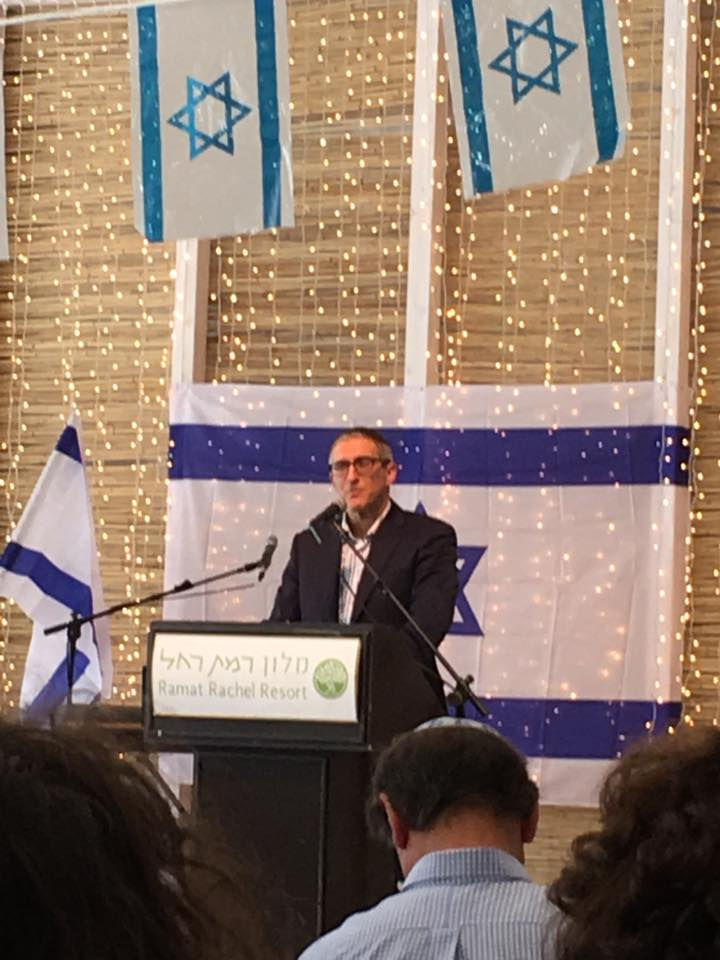
Wolicki speaking at the central 3rd annual Day to Praise Israel Independence Day event held in Ramat Rachel, 2 May 2017

Wolicki served as a pulpit rabbi at Adath Jeshurun Orthodox synagogue in Virginia and as development director of Hillel Academy in Fairfield, Connecticut.

In 2003, he became rosh yeshiva of Yeshivat Yesodei HaTorah. He worked as a political activist in several organizations, including service as executive director of the Campaign for Missing Israeli Soldiers.

In 2015, Wolicki became the associate director for the Center for Jewish-Christian Understanding and Cooperation. He left this position in 2019.

In a September 2015 article for The Times of Israel Wolicki expounded his strong support of Rabbi Shlomo Riskin's global Day to Praise interfaith initiative fighting off claims of 'foreign fire' by the Haredi Jewish circles and citing, in regards to the initiative, that "while discomfort is understandable, we dare not assume that what is uncomfortable and new is therefore forbidden."

=== Blessing Bethlehem ===
In September 2016, Wolicki launched CJCUC's "Blessing Bethlehem" fundraising initiative at the LifeLight Festival in Sioux Falls, South Dakota in an effort to create a food giveaway program for persecuted Christians in Bethlehem.

== Works ==
- Cup of Salvation (Center for Jewish-Christian Understanding and Cooperation, Gefen Publishing, 2017) ISBN 978-9652299352
- Verses for Zion (Israel365, 2023) ISBN 9781957109510
