= Shlomo Riskin =

American-Israeli Orthodox Jewish rabbi

Rabbi Dr. Shlomo Riskin שלמה ריסקין
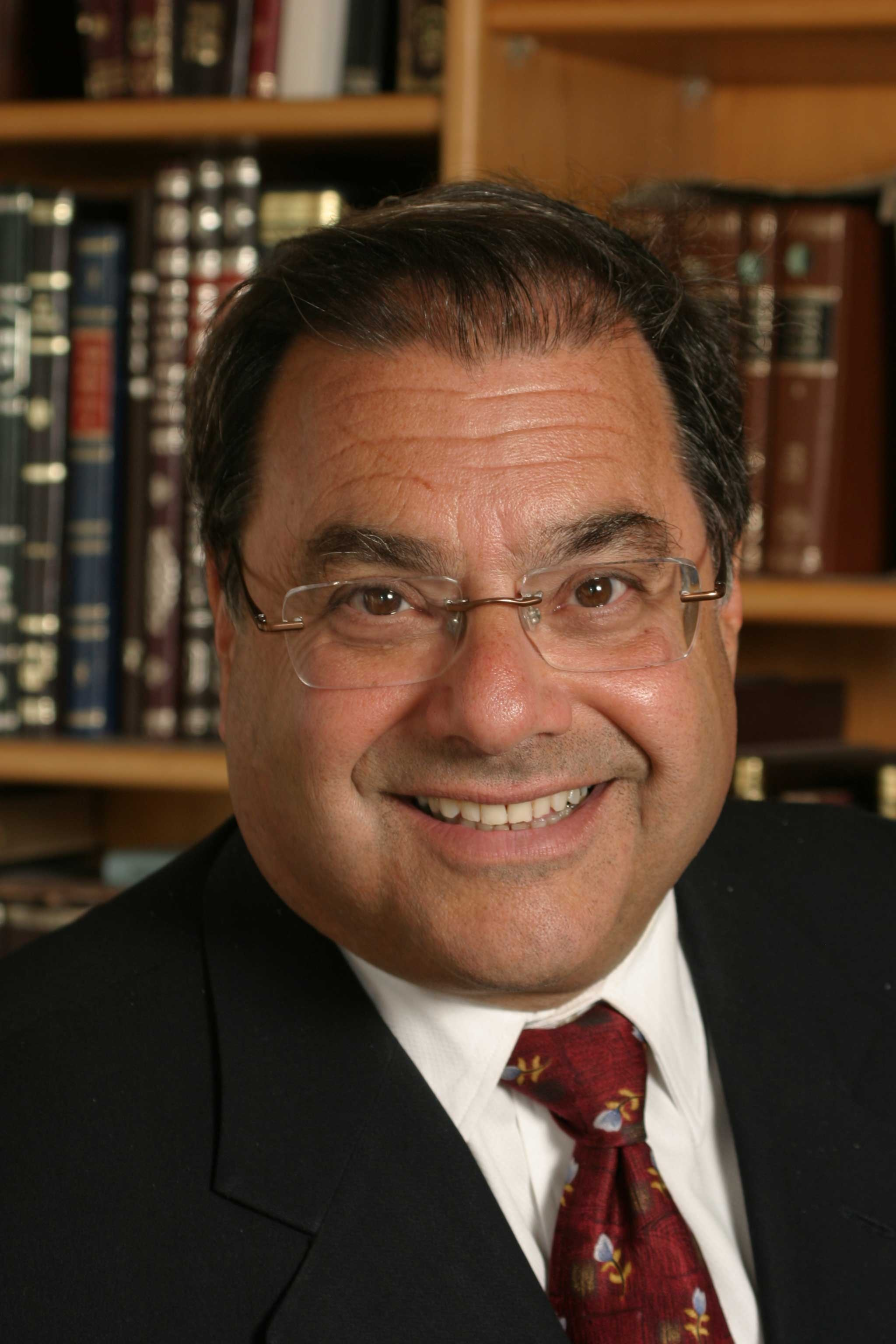

Personal life
- Born: Steven Riskin; May 28, 1940 (age 86) 20 Iyar 5700 Brooklyn, New York
- Spouse: Victoria Pollins Riskin
- Children: 4
- Occupation: Founding Chief Rabbi of Efrat, Author, Chancellor

Religious life
- Religion: Judaism
- Denomination: Orthodox Judaism

Jewish leader
- Successor: Rabbi Kenneth Brander
- Synagogue: Lincoln Square Synagogue
- Organisation: Ohr Torah Stone
- Residence: Efrat, West Bank
- Semikhah: Yeshiva University

Shlomo Riskin (Hebrew: שלמה ריסקין; born May 28, 1940) is an Orthodox rabbi, and the founding rabbi of Lincoln Square Synagogue on the Upper West Side of New York City, which he led for 20 years; founding chief rabbi of the Israeli settlement of Efrat in the Israeli-occupied West Bank; former dean of Manhattan Day School in New York City; and founder and Chancellor of the Ohr Torah Stone Institutions, a network of high schools, colleges, and graduate Programs in the United States and Israel.

== Early career ==
Shlomo Riskin was born on May 28, 1940, in Brooklyn, New York. He attended Yeshiva University High School for Boys, and graduated valedictorian, summa cum laude, from Yeshiva University in 1960, where he received rabbinic ordination under the guidance of Rabbi Joseph Soloveitchik. In 1963, Riskin received his master's degree in Jewish history, and he completed a Ph.D. from New York University in 1982. From 1963 until 1977, he lectured and served as an Associate Professor of Tanakh and Talmud at Yeshiva University in New York City.

== Community leadership in New York ==
At the age of 23, Riskin became the founding rabbi of Lincoln Square Synagogue in New York City and served in that position until 1983. Rabbi Riskin transformed the Conservative minyan into one of New York's most innovative and dynamic Orthodox communities. The synagogue became particularly well known for its pioneering outreach programs which inspired many secular people to become religiously observant Orthodox Jews.

During the 1960s and 1970s, he became a leader of the movement to allow free, unfettered emigration for persecuted Soviet Jews and made several trips to visit and strengthen the Jewish communities in the then USSR. He was the chairman of Student Struggle for Soviet Jewry, the first American national movement to free Russian Jews.

== Community leadership in Israel ==
In 1983, Riskin immigrated to the Israeli settlement of Efrat in the Israeli-occupied West Bank with his family, where he became the founding Chief Rabbi, a position he held until 2020. Over the years, he was joined by many former members of his New York congregation. In Israel, Riskin has established a network of high schools, colleges, graduate programs, seminaries and rabbinical schools under the name Ohr Torah Stone Institutions with a total student enrollment numbering in the thousands.

Riskin has dedicated himself to training a new generation of leaders for the Orthodox Jewish world. To this end, he established a Rabbinical Seminary and Practical Rabbinics Program to prepare young men with the scholarship and practical skills to become effective spiritual leaders, teachers and spokesmen for Orthodox Judaism. Riskin now has hundreds of former students serving as rabbis and educators in Israel and throughout the world.

He has also pioneered the rights of women in the world of Orthodox Judaism. He broadened women's participation in public religious practices, and declared that women could hold their own celebration of Simhat Torah. He co-founded a women's college, Midreshet Lindenbaum (originally named Michlelet Bruria), a prominent seminary for Orthodox women. In 2014, the first-ever book of halachic decisions written by women who were ordained to serve as poskim (Idit Bartov and Anat Novoselsky) was published. The women were ordained by Riskin, after completing Midreshet Lindenbaum women's college five-year ordination course in advanced studies in Jewish law, as well as passing examinations equivalent to the rabbinate's requirement for men. In addition, in 2021 he supported the appointment of an additional graduate of this program Rabbanit Shira Marili Mirvis as the spiritual leader of the Shirat HaTamar synagogue in Efrat. Marili Mirvis is the first woman to serve as the sole leader of an Orthodox congregation in Israel.

In 1991, Riskin issued a challenge in Israel's High Court to the laws which prevented women from serving as Toanot - advocates in the Rabbinical Court. Riskin won the case and established the first program for the training of women advocates in the religious courts. Graduates of the program now defend the rights of Agunot (women whose husbands refuse to grant them a divorce) in the religious courts, helping them to secure a Get (bill of religious divorce). Riskin is an advocate of prenuptial agreements as a solution for the problem of recalcitrant husbands.

Parallel to these institutions, Riskin also established the first ever programs for young men and women from the Diaspora with severe learning and developmental difficulties to spend a year studying Torah in Israel while also gaining vocational training.

Riskin is a forceful spokesperson for Jews and Israel, and against anti-Semitism and anti-Zionism. As an advocate of religious and cultural tolerance, he has worked to promote good relations with the leaders of the Palestinian villages surrounding the Efrat settlement.

In 2008, Riskin established the Center for Jewish–Christian Understanding and Cooperation, or CJCUC, the first Orthodox Jewish institution to dialogue with the Christian world on a religious and theological basis. The center, currently located in Jerusalem, engages in Hebraic Bible Study for Christians, from both the local community and from abroad, has organized numerous interfaith praise initiatives, such as Day to Praise, and has established many fund-raising initiatives such as Blessing Bethlehem which aim to aid the persecuted Christian community of Bethlehem, in part, and the larger persecuted Christian community of the Middle East region and throughout the world. Since Riskin's retirement as president of Ohr Torah Stone in 2018, the overseeing of all CJCUC activities has been turned over to David Nekrutman who has served as the center's chief director since its inception.

In 2018, Riskin was awarded the Bonei Zion (Builders of Zion) Prize for outstanding achievements in Education.

== Controversy ==
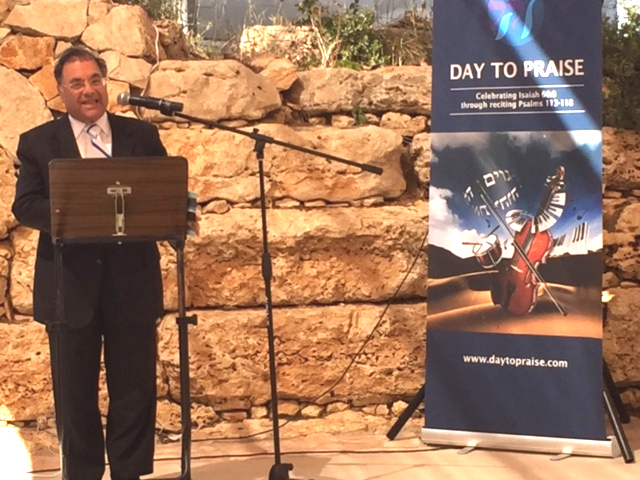
Rabbi Shlomo Riskin at the central Day to Praise event in Gush Etzion, 12 May 2016

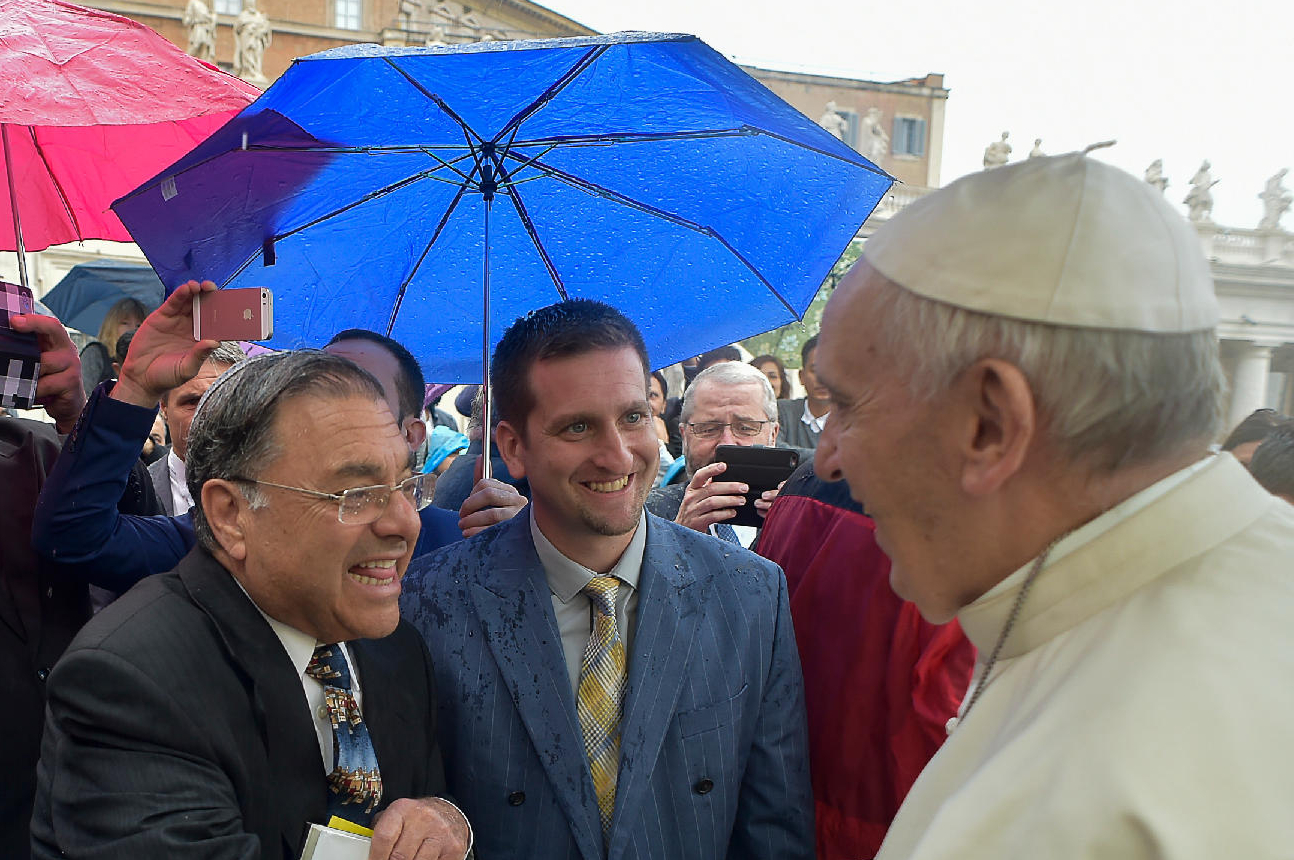
Rabbi Shlomo Riskin, and CJCUC Executive Director, David Nekrutman, meet with Pope Francis in Rome, Italy, 26 October 2016

Rabbi Riskin's term as Chief Rabbi of Efrat was extended by five years on June 28, 2015, after a month-long controversy in which the Chief Rabbinate was allegedly planning to retire him at age 75 because of his religious views on the advancement of women in Orthodoxy and an inclusive approach towards conversion.

Rabbi Riskin was accused of comparing U.S. President Barack Obama to the antagonist of the Book of Esther, Haman, in a March 28, 2015, speech in the Great Synagogue in Jerusalem.

In April 2015, Riskin's launching of the Day to Praise interfaith joint praise initiative caused an uproar within the Haredi and other conservative-Orthodox Jewish circles. In a statement, the once chief Sephardi Rabbi of Israel, and the chief Rabbi of Jerusalem, Rabbi Shlomo Amar, expressed his "stomach churning" in light of the joint Hallel prayer of Jews and Christians in a synagogue in Jerusalem being led by Rabbi Riskin. In a rebuttal, Rabbi Riskin defended his actions, stating that, "We are talking about a thanksgiving prayer to G-d that would include Christians who worship His actions towards the Jewish people and the Land of Israel... What could possibly be more appropriate?"

In 2010, Riskin appeared in a video where he referenced Jesus with a title of Rabbi, and called Jesus a "model Rabbi", referring to the historical origins of Jesus as a Jew, and not of the modern perception of Jesus. Many took Riskin's statements out of context, claiming that Riskin's statements are incompatible with mainstream theologies in other forms of Judaism. Riskin explained in an additional statement that a poor edit to the video left out his explanation elaborating upon the fundamental differences between the religions, and the historical context within which his statements were made.

== Bibliography ==
- Community study, "The binding of Isaac," at the 92nd Street Y, 1395 Lexington Avenue, New York, New York. 92nd Street Y. 1981. (with Alan W. Miller and Sheldon Zimmerman)
- Yad L'Isha: A Halakhic Perspective on Women and Divorce (in Hebrew). Maggid Books. 1989.
- Around the family table: A comprehensive "bencher" and companion for Shabbat and festival meals and other family occasions. Urim. 2005. ISBN 965-7108-61-6.
- The Passover Haggadah with a traditional and contemporary commentary. Ktav Publishing. 1984. ISBN 0-88125-014-7.
- Torah Lights: Bereshit: Confronting Life, Love & Family. Maggid Books. 2009. ISBN 978-1-59264-272-4.
- Torah Lights: Exodus defines the birth of a nation. Ohr Torah Stone. 2009. ISBN 978-965-7108-63-5.
- Torah Lights: Vayikra Sacrifice, Sanctity and Silence. Maggid Books. 2009. ISBN 978-1-59264-274-8.
- Si'ach Shulchan: A Birkon with Insights & Commentary (in Hebrew). Maggid Books. 2009.
- Listening to God: Inspirational stories for my grandchildren. Maggid Books. 2010. ISBN 978-1-59264-292-2.

== See also ==
- Efrat
- Ohr Torah Stone
- Yeshivat Hamivtar
- Center for Jewish-Christian Understanding and Cooperation (CJCUC)
- Day to Praise
