= Blessing Bethlehem =

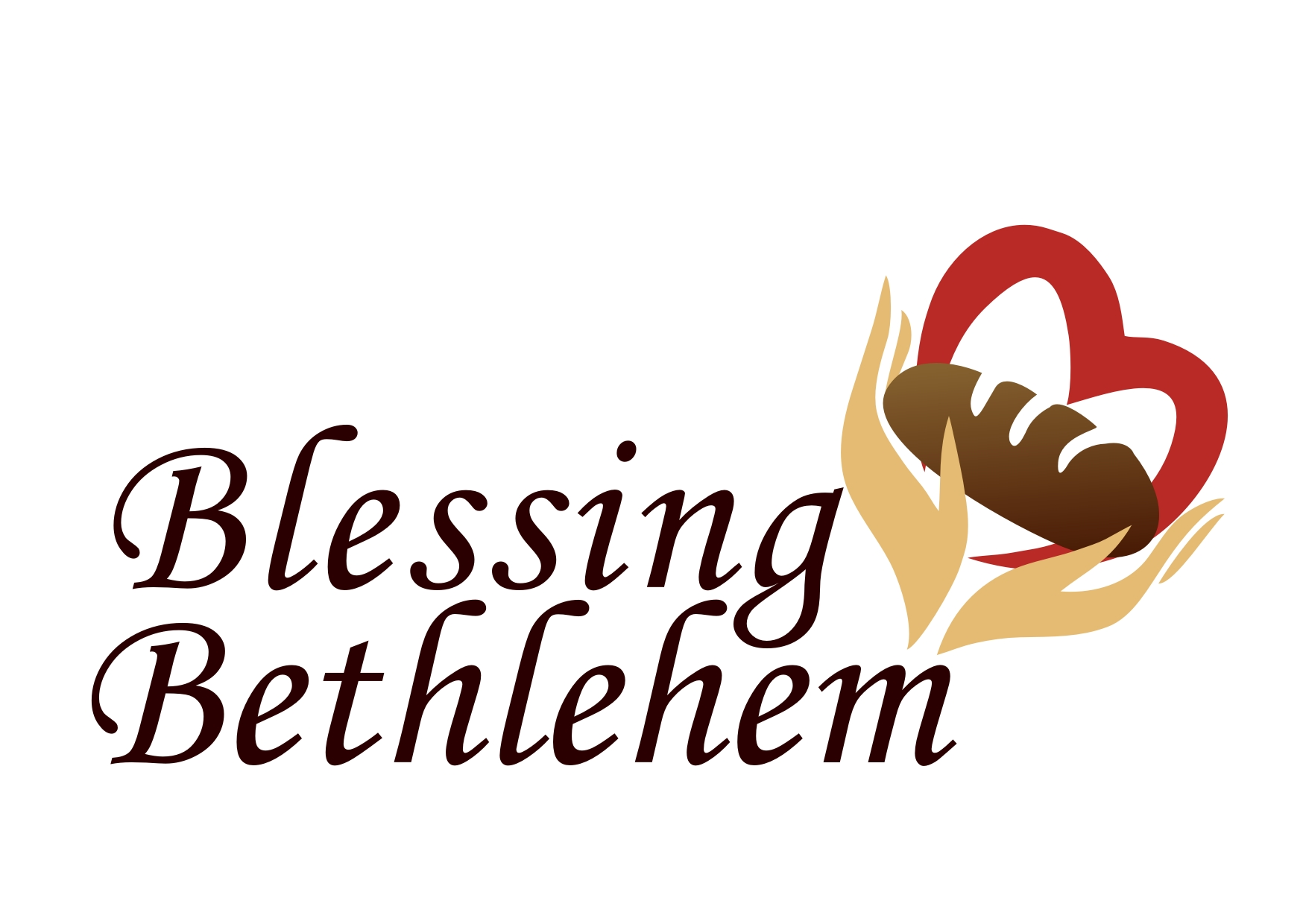
- Official logo of Blessing Bethlehem
- Founded: September 2016
- Founders: David Nekrutman; Pastor Steven Khoury; Rabbi Pesach Wolicki
- Type: Charity
- Purpose: Food giveaway program in an effort to help the persecuted Christians of Bethlehem.
- Location(s): Ohr Torah Stone; 49 West 45th Street, Suite 701; New York, New York 10036; U.S.A.
- Parent organization: Ohr Torah Stone's Center for Jewish–Christian Understanding and Cooperation (CJCUC)
- Website: blessingbethlehem.com

Blessing Bethlehem is a charity fundraising initiative with the purpose of helping the Evangelical Christian Arab community living in the city of Bethlehem and its surrounding areas. It was launched in September 2016 by the Center for Jewish–Christian Understanding and Cooperation (CJCUC), at the LifeLight Festival in Sioux Falls, South Dakota.

== History ==
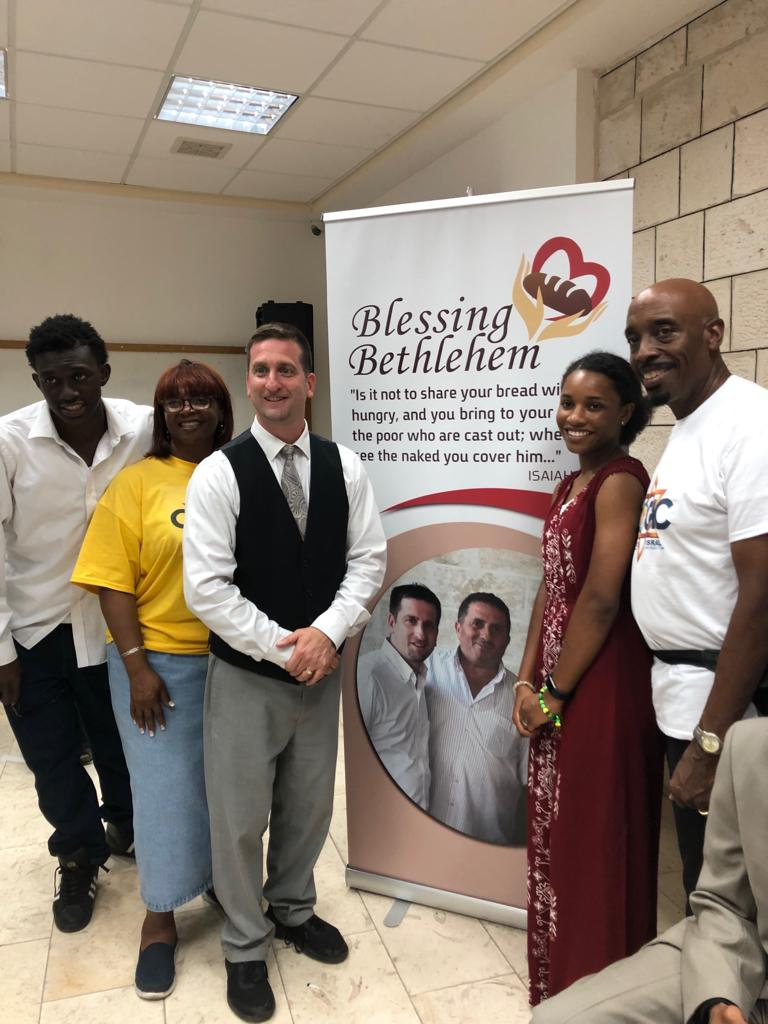
"Blessing Bethlehem" Founder & Director David Nekrutman with volunteers, 2019

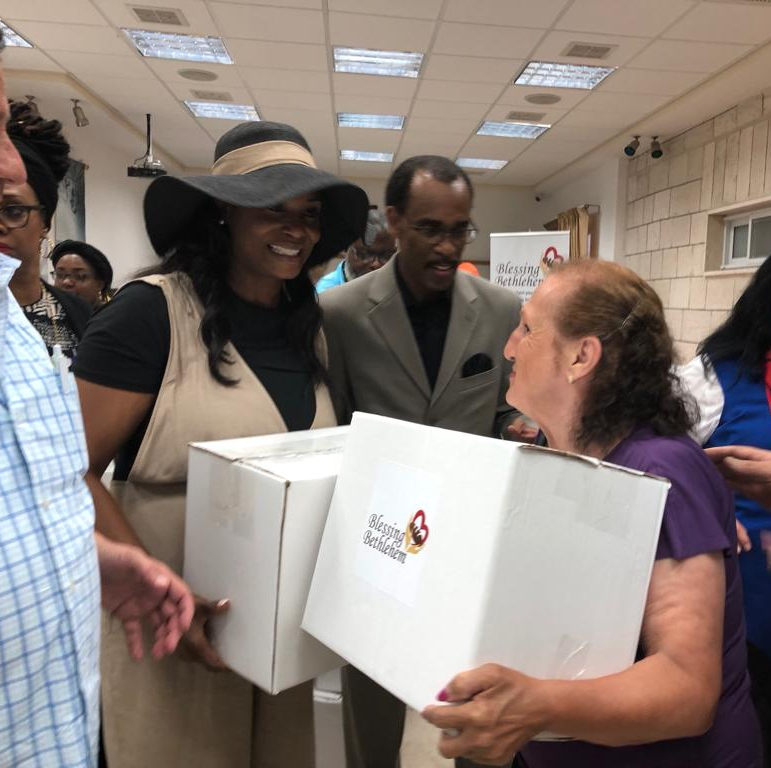
COGIC Bishop of Israel, Glenn Plummer, and First Lady Pauline Plummer handing out Blessing Bethlehem Food Care Packages in Bethlehem, 24 July 2019

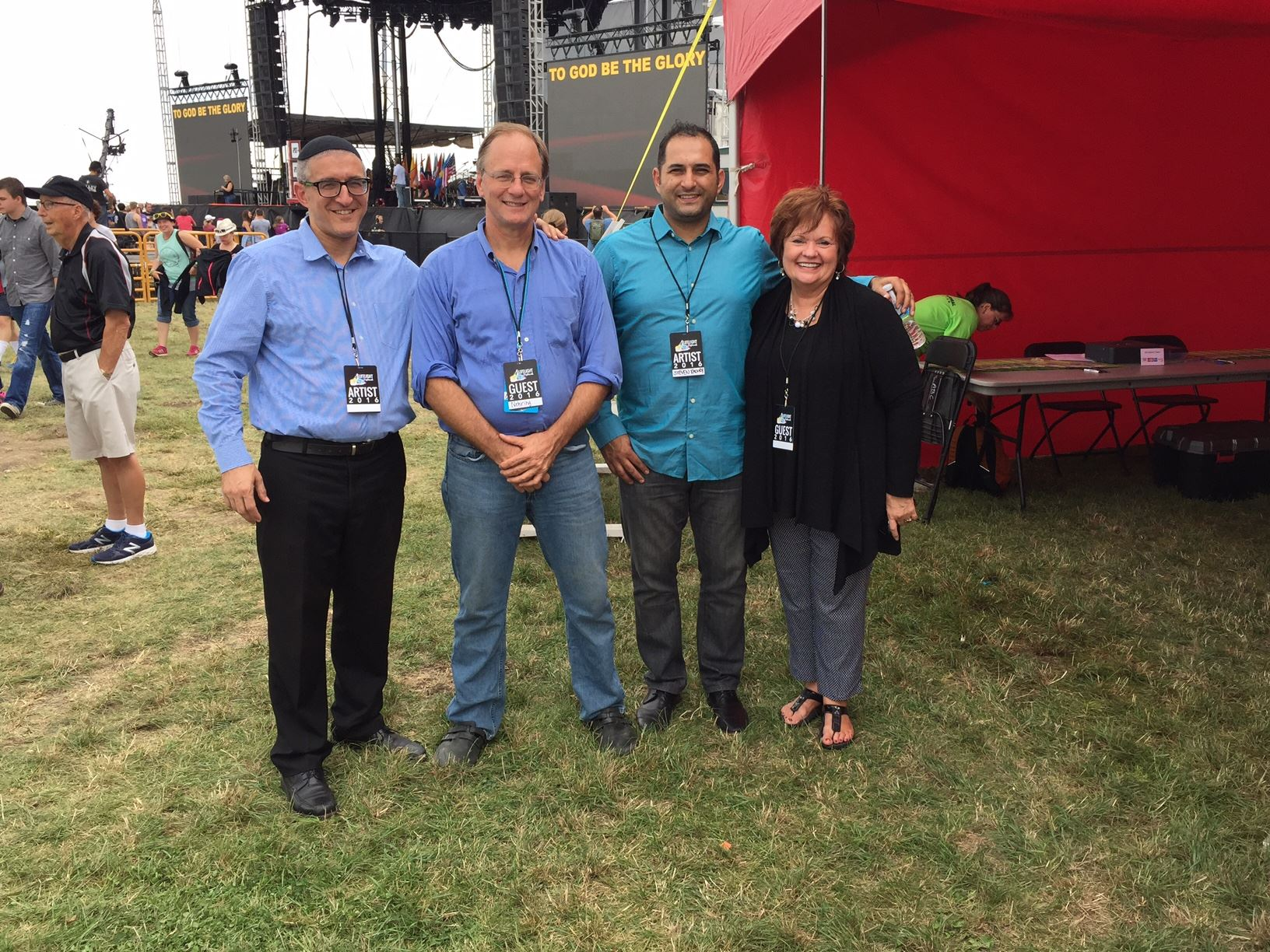
From left to right: Former Associate Director of the Center for Jewish–Christian Understanding and Cooperation, Rabbi Pesach Wolicki, David Nehring, Pastor Steven Khoury, CJCUC U.S. Coordinator, Janet Cain launching "Blessing Bethlehem" at the LifeLight Music Festival in Sioux Falls, South Dakota, 5 September 2016

In September 2012, Ohr Torah Stone's CJCUC, in partnership with Pastor Steven Khoury of Holy Land Missions, launched a food voucher program to help the evangelical Christian community living in Bethlehem. CJCUC's Executive Director, David Nekrutman, began his dialogue with the Christian Arab community in 2009 through the organization's Bible Study Program.

Nekrutman learned of the Evangelical Christian Arab community's struggle between their ethnicity and religion and he wanted to alleviate the number one issue - poverty.

With initial funding from American Jewish donors, the food voucher program began by purchasing vouchers from the Rami Levy supermarket chain. In 2013, the International Christian Embassy of Jerusalem (ICEJ) joined the program. In 2016, the Food Voucher Program was renamed "Blessing Bethlehem" and officially launched at the LifeLight Music Festival in Sioux Falls, South Dakota.
