= The Isaiah Projects =

Educational and charity organization

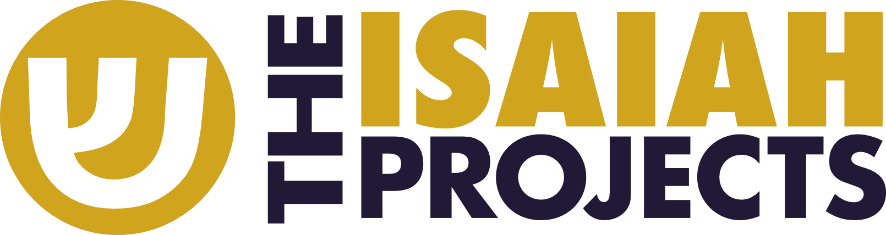
- Formation: 2022; 4 years ago
- Founders: Janet Cain; David Nekrutman; Pastor Donna Taylor; Marsha Conrad
- Location: Powder Springs, Georgia
- Services: Jewish–Christian relations; Bible study; Charity; Humanitarian aid
- CEO: Janet Cain
- Executive director: David Nekrutman
- Website: www.theisaiahprojects.com

The Isaiah Projects is a ministry and charity organization, based in Powder Springs, Georgia, dedicated to creating educational tools in order to help Christians discover the Hebraic roots of their faith as well as providing food packages and humanitarian aid to individuals and families in need. It was founded in 2022 by Janet Cain (CEO), David Nekrutman (Executive director), Pastor Donna Taylor, and Marsha Conrad.

== History ==
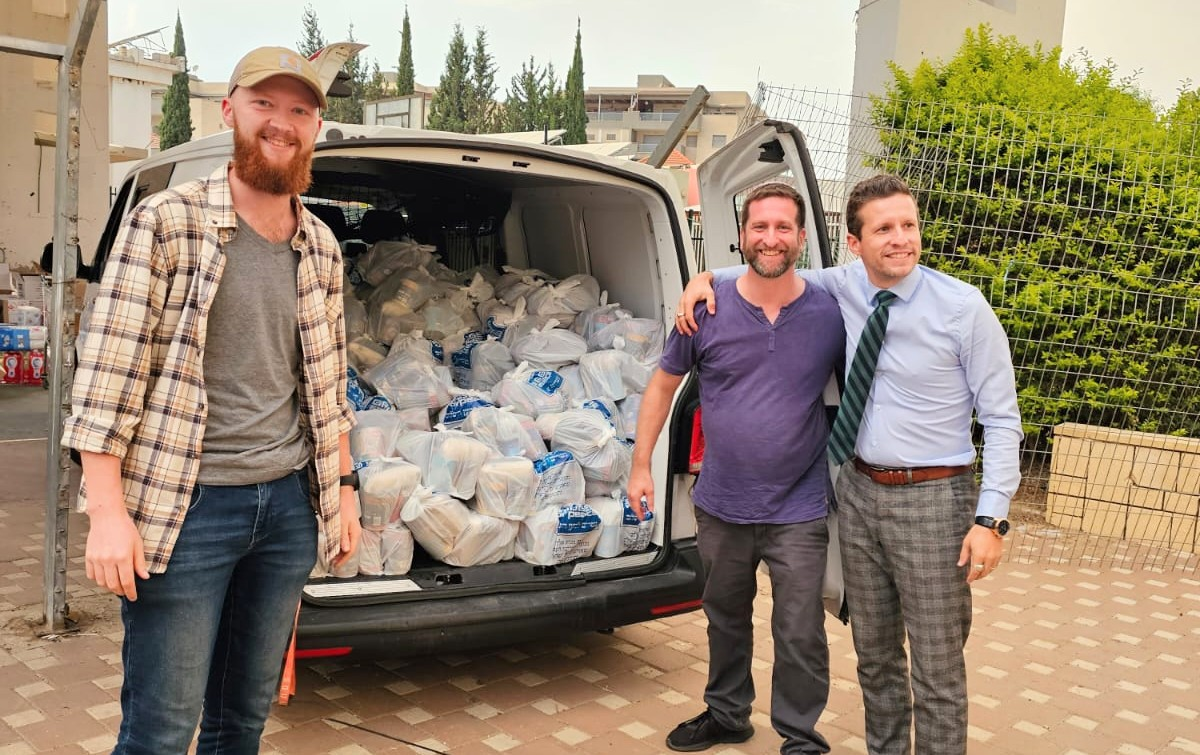
The Isaiah Projects delivering bags of food in the town of Sderot during the Israel-Hamas War, 2023

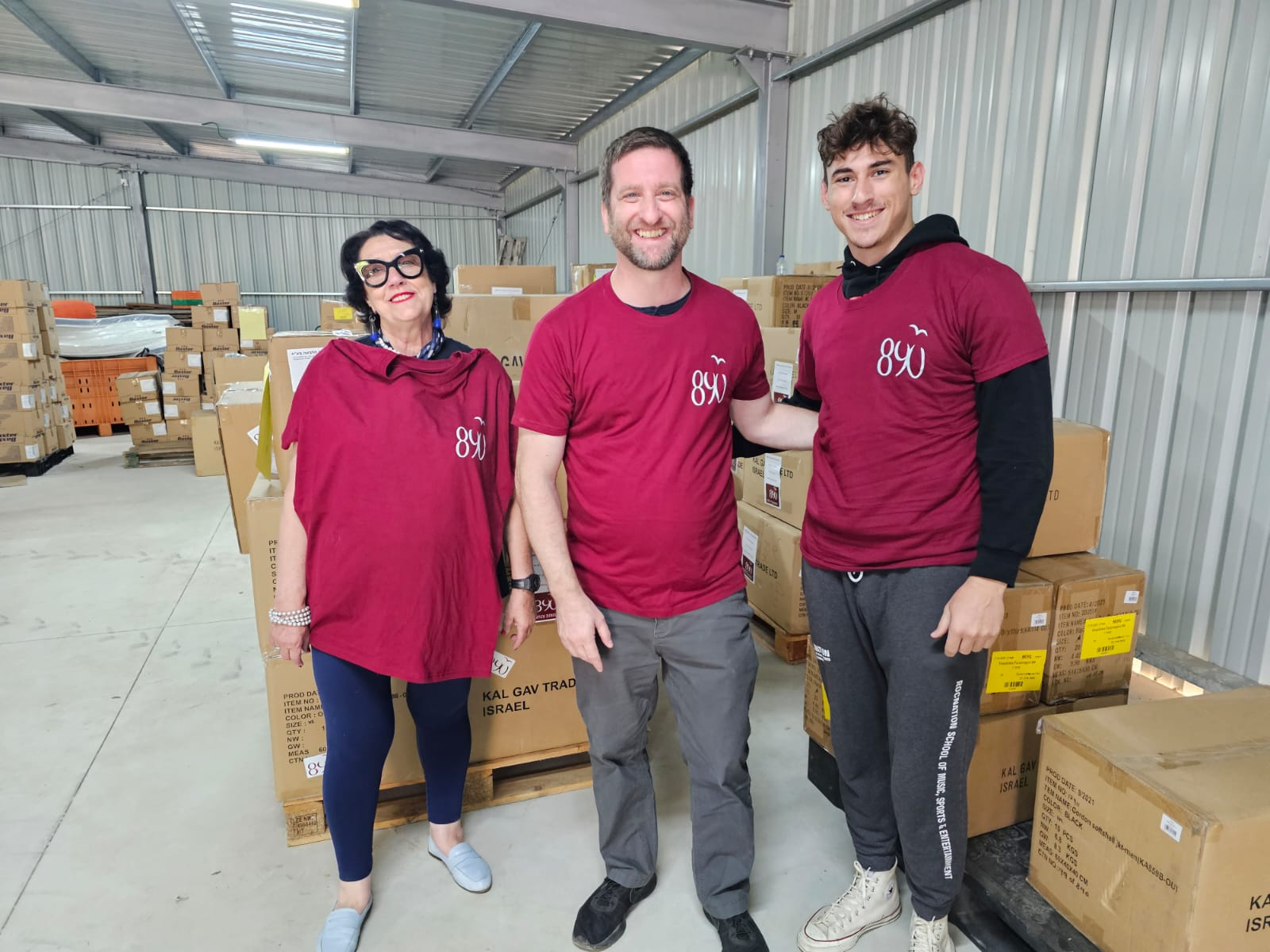
The Isaiah Projects providing clothing to first responders during the Israel-Hamas War, 2023

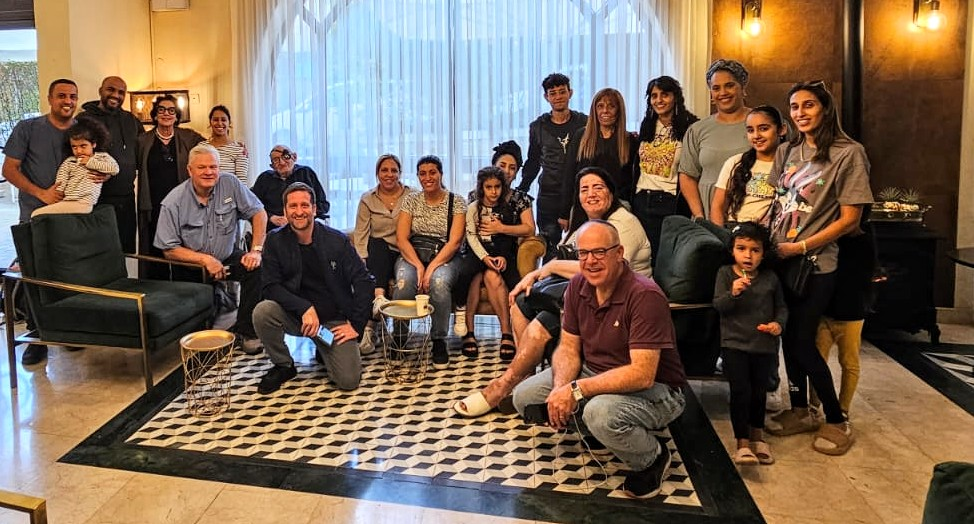
The Isaiah Projects with evacuees from Moshav Mash'en during the Israel-Hamas War, 16 October 2023

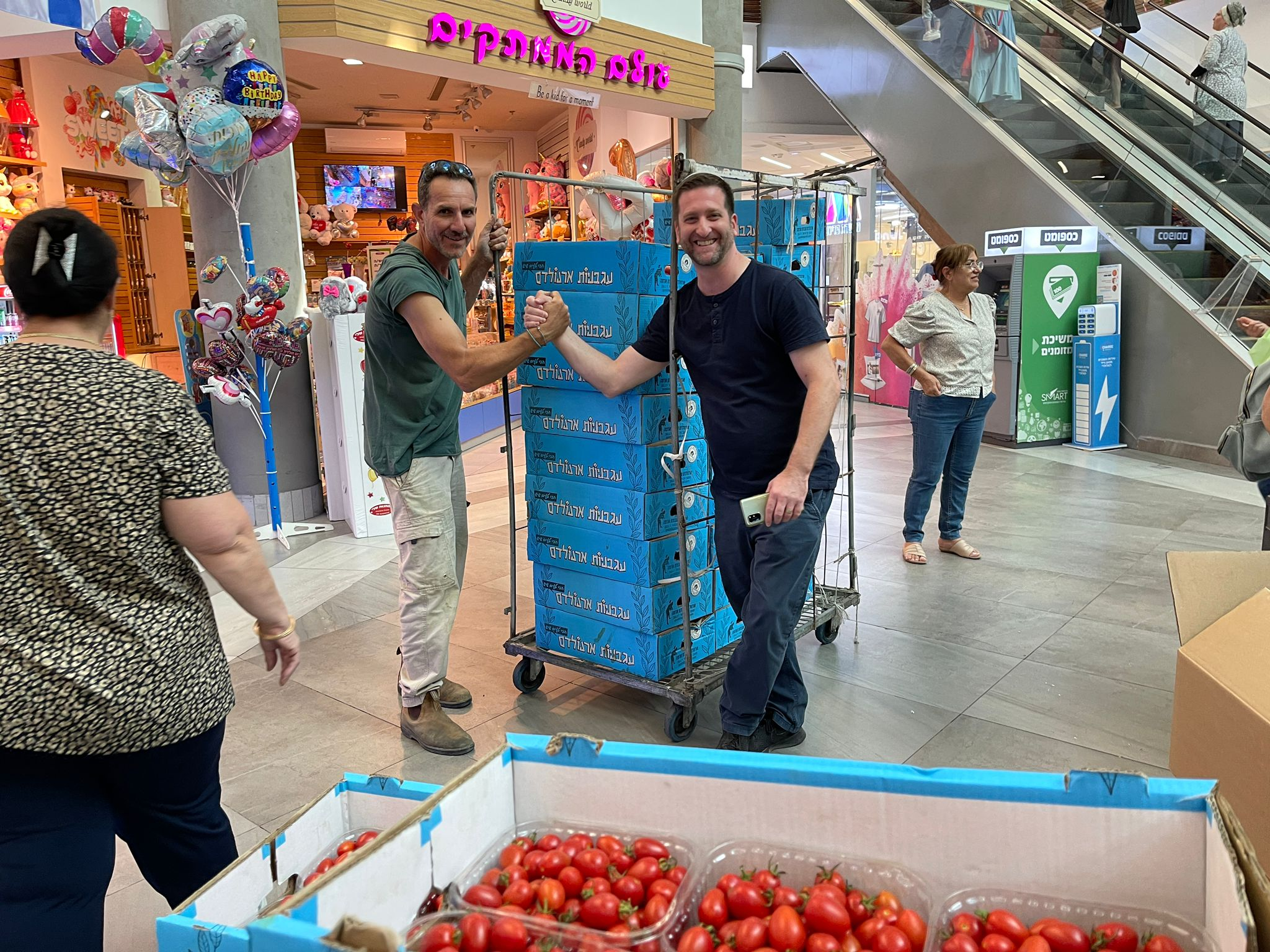
The Isaiah Projects' Farm to Table Initiative during the Israel-Hamas War, 2023

The Isaiah Projects was founded in 2022 by Janet Cain (CEO), David Nekrutman (Executive director), Pastor Donna Taylor, and Marsha Conrad with the mission of educating Christians about the Hebraic origins of Christianity. The organization started out by focusing on three main topics; The first is Shabbat (The Sabbath) as a movement, its fulfillment of Messianic Prophecy and how it can be adopted and incorporated into one's life. The second is creating written resources about the Hebraic roots of Christianity. And the third is providing food packages and humanitarian aid to those in need.

In March 2022, the organization's first educational resource, Your Sabbath Invitation, was published.

In April 2023, The Isaiah Projects, together with Shmuel Bowman of Operation Lifeshield, spearheaded a fundraising campaign for the purchase of bomb shelters for kindergartens in the northern Israeli town of Shlomi situated on the border with Lebanon.

In 2023, the organization, together with Pastor Steven Khoury of "Holy Land Missions", led a humanitarian effort to save Dina, a Gazan woman whose husband was murdered over a property dispute. The organization helped to secure safe passage for Dina from Gaza to Bethlehem in the West Bank. When asked about the organization's part in rescuing Dina, CEO Janet Cain replied that care for the widow and the orphan is cemented in biblical scripture. In addition, Executive director, David Nekrutman, stated that "covenant land comes with covenant responsibility" and that helping others is part of the foundations on which he was raised.

=== Activity during 2023 Gaza war ===
On the morning of October 7, 2023, following the unexpected missile attack by Hamas on Israel and the subsequent reports of a massacre in the southern region and the resulting Gaza war, The Isaiah Projects spearheaded an initiative to relocate and care for the needs of scores of people evacuated from the Gaza area. In cooperation with other Jewish and Christian organizations, members of The Isaiah Projects helped to evacuate nearly 50 families from the farming community of Moshav Mash'en to Jerusalem. The Isaiah Projects, along with members of the "Genesis 123" organization, led by Jonathan Feldstein, helped in recouping boarding expenses for around 60 people who were evacuated from the Gaza area to Jerusalem. In addition to addressing the immediate needs of evacuees from Gaza, The Isaiah Projects, in cooperation with "Bridges for Peace", vowed to provide 50 families with household appliances including sponsoring mental health sessions to those affected.

=== Activity during 2025 Twelve-Day War ===
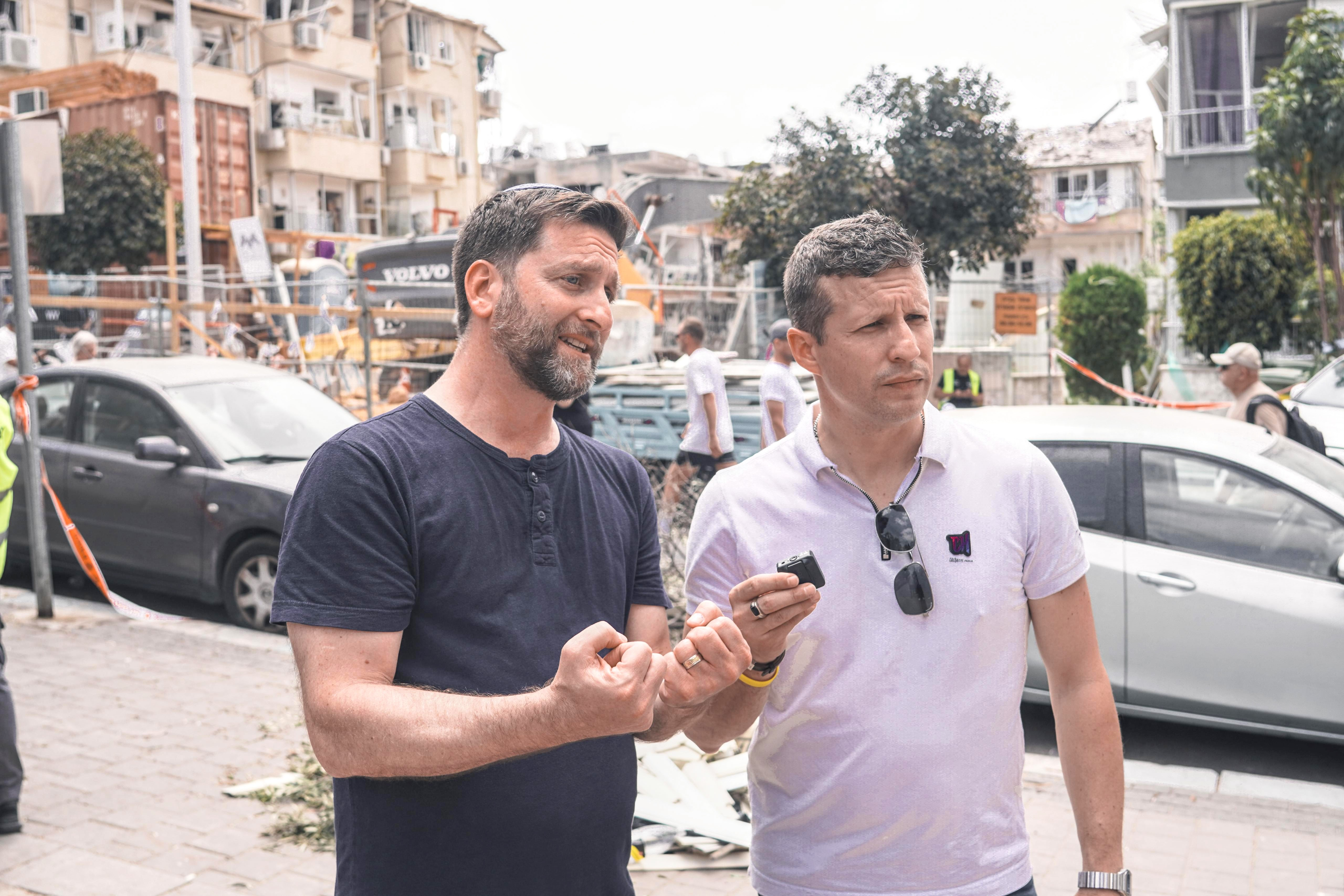
David Nekrutman and Peter Fast (CEO of Bridges for Peace) at the site of a missile attack in Bat Yam during Twelve-Day War, 15 June 2025

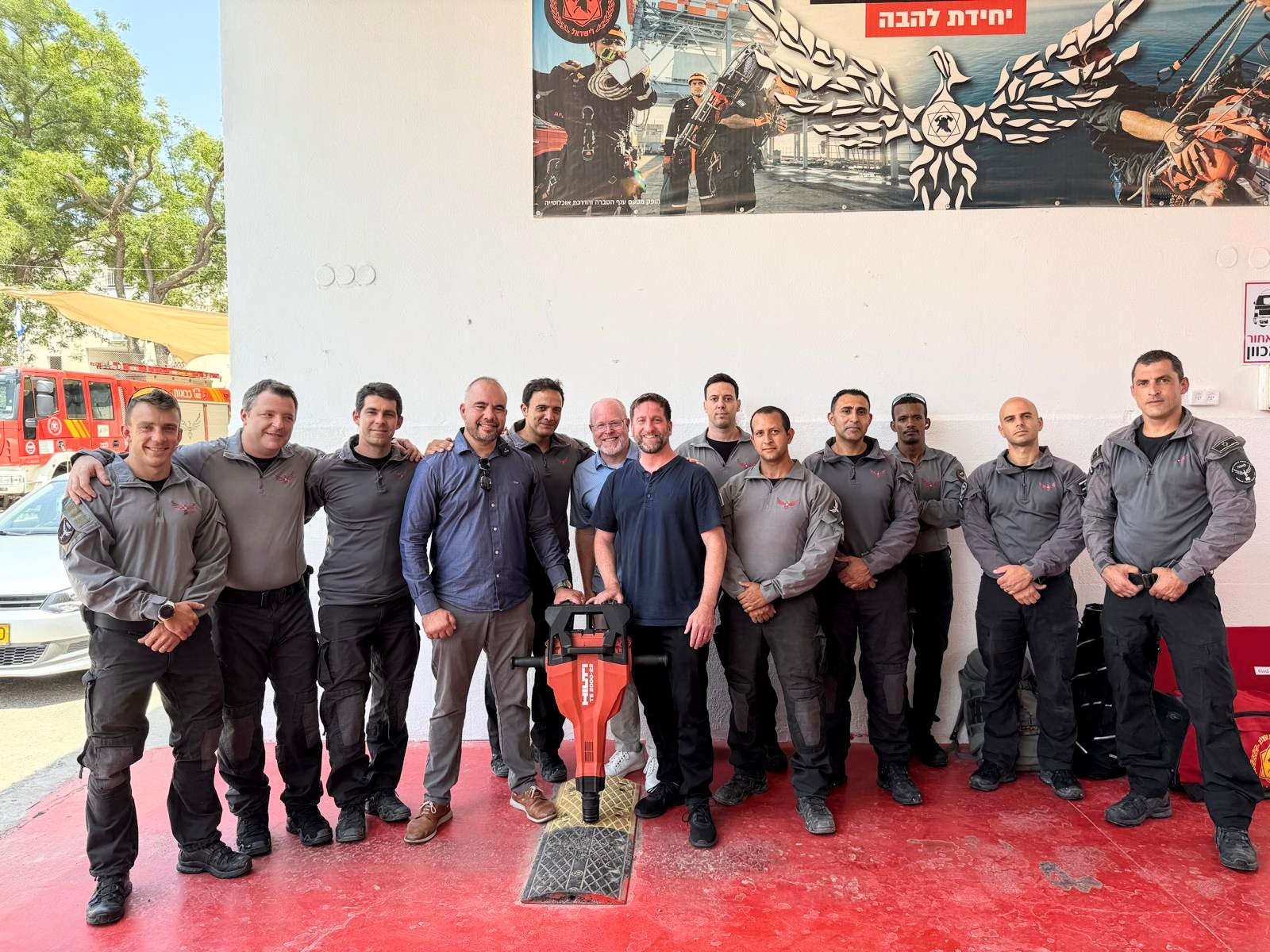
David Nekrutman and Pastor Adam Thornton delivering rescue equipment to Lehava Rescue Unit during Twelve-Day War, 16 June 2025

In June 2025, after a preemptive strike by the Israeli Air Force on military and nuclear installation targets in Iran during "Operation Rising Lion" (Hebrew: עם כלביא) and the resulting Twelve-Day War, many Israeli civilian residential centers were hit by retaliatory ballistic missile barrages launched by Iran. These attacks resulted in civilian deaths and injuries and caused major property damages across Israel. After one such attack in the Israeli town of Bat Yam on the morning of June 15, in an interview on the ground for CBN News "Jerusalem Dateline", The Isaiah Project's executive director, David Nekrutman, called this event an "unprecedented moment in Israeli history" and that together with the Bridges for Peace organization they were there providing assistance to rescue teams on the ground by making sure they are provided with special equipment. Nekrutman also reiterated the "covenantal bond" between Jews and Christians who are working together.

=== Activity during 2026 Iran War ===
On February 28th 2026, after the start of the Iran war, executive director, David Nekrutman, was on his way back home on a business trip in the United States and was in the UK at the time. Since the airspace in Israel had been closed, Nekrutman decided to fly to Egypt and make his way into Israel via land with the goal of delivering life-saving equipment to first responders on the ground tending to areas hit by missile barrages coming in from Iran. In addition, Nekrutman, was on the ground at Kibbutz Nir Oz on the Gaza border delivering the "Eye in the Sky" surveillance system, that was donated by the Daystar Network, to a community directly affected by the October 7th attacks that occurred two and a half years beforehand.
