= Day to Praise =

Jewish–Christian interfaith initiative

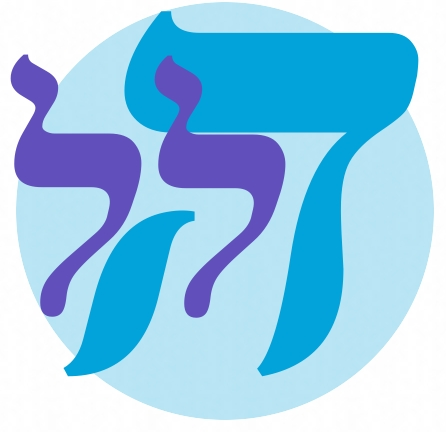
- Observed by: Jews and Christians
- Celebrations: Reciting of the full Hallel (Psalms 113–118) in synagogues, church groups, and individuals in celebration of the State of Israel on Yom Ha'atzmaut (Israel's Independence Day)
- Date: 5 Iyar (Hebrew calendar)
- 2025 date: Sunset, 30 April – nightfall, 1 May
- 2026 date: Sunset, 21 April – nightfall, 22 April
- 2027 date: Sunset, 11 May – nightfall, 12 May
- 2028 date: Sunset, 1 May – nightfall, 2 May
- Frequency: Annual
- Related to: Independence Day (Israel)

Day to Praise (Hebrew: יום הלל, romanized: yom hallel) is a global interfaith praise initiative set forth by the Center for Jewish–Christian Understanding and Cooperation (CJCUC) chancellor and founder Rabbi Shlomo Riskin and CJCUC executive director David Nekrutman. The initiative takes the form of an annual event on Yom Ha'atzmaut—Israel's Independence Day—during which Christians worldwide are invited to join Jews in reciting the full Hallel (Psalms 113–118), praising God for the State of Israel.

== Background ==
The full Hallel consists of six chapters (113–118) of the book of Psalms, which are recited as a unit on joyous occasions. These occasions include the mornings of the first one or two days of Pesach (depending on whether the celebrant lives in the Jewish diaspora or Israel), as well as on Shavuot, Sukkot, Shemini Atzeret–Simchat Torah, and Hanukkah. The partial Hallel—which omits some passages of the six psalms, depending on the community's custom—is recited on the first day of every Hebrew month (ראש חודש, Rosh Chodesh, 'head of [the] month') and the intermediate and final days of Pesach.

Two years after the establishment of the State of Israel in 1948, the Chief Rabbinate of Israel decided that Yom Ha'atzmaut should be given the status of a minor Jewish holiday and include the recitation of Hallel. The recitation of the blessing preceding Hallel was introduced in 1973 by Israeli Chief Rabbi Shlomo Goren.

== History ==
=== Conception ===
In October 2014, Rabbi Shlomo Riskin, the chancellor and founder of the CJCUC, became the first Orthodox rabbi to invite Christian visitors to Israel to participate in a "praise rally" with Jewish and interfaith leaders at the center's headquarters during the holiday of Sukkot—one of the Jewish festivals during which the full Hallel is recited daily. This celebratory event would serve as the basis for the eventual conception of the global Day to Praise initiative.

=== In 2015 ===
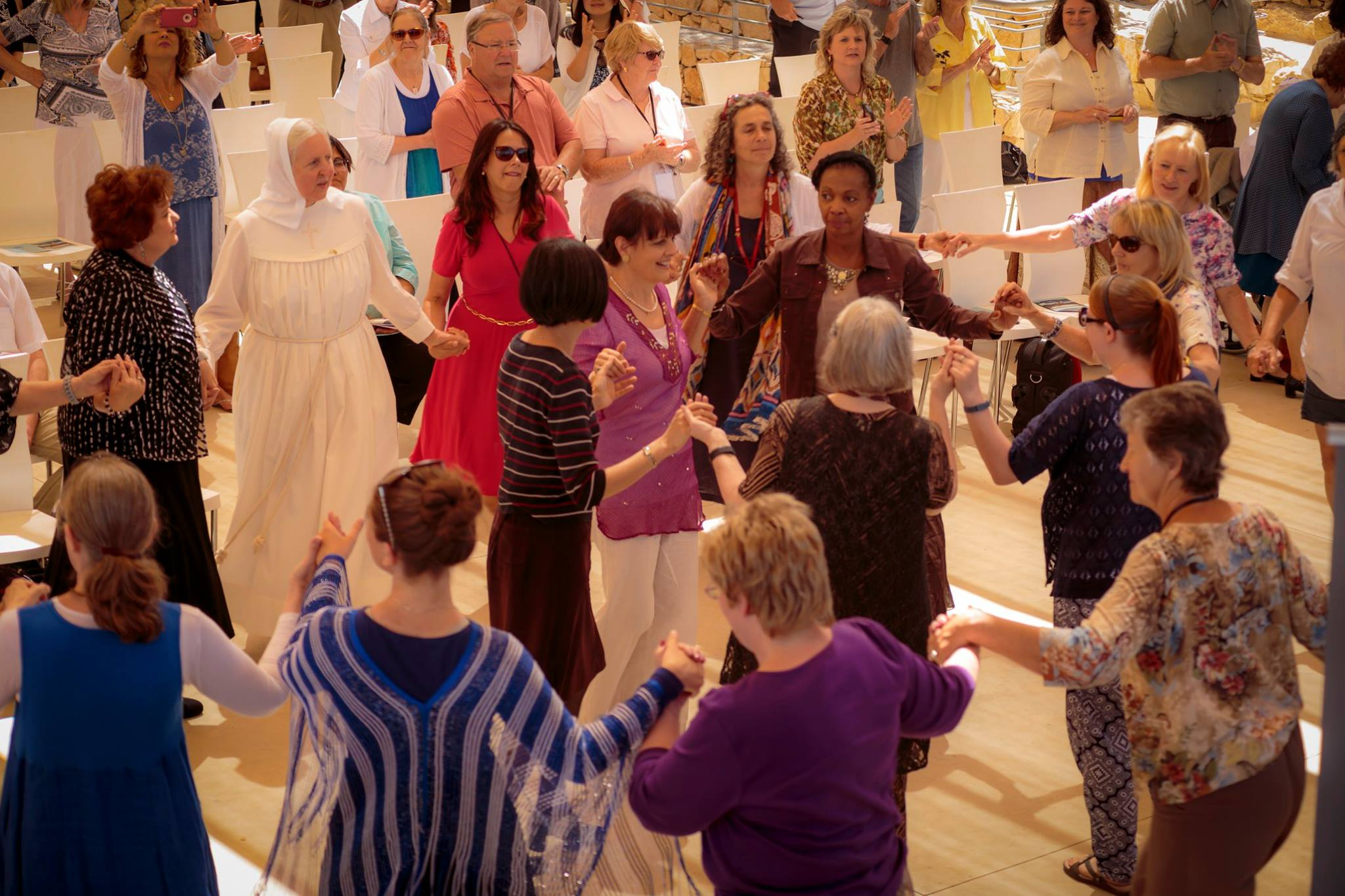
Dancing at the central Day to Praise event, 12 May 2016

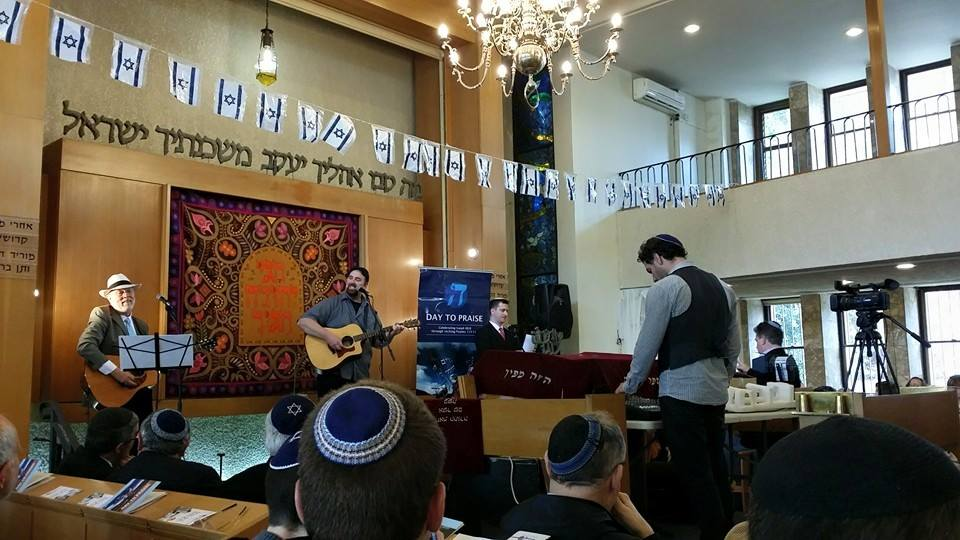
The central Day to Praise event at HaZvi Israel Synagogue in Jerusalem, 23 April 2015

The Day to Praise Global initiative was launched in March 2015. In an email sent to his followers, Riskin wrote:

Given the honorary title of Ambassador for Jewish-Christian Relations from Prime Minister Benjamin Netanyahu, God has recently put on my heart to fulfill the mandate of Psalm 117: "Praise the LORD, all you nations; extol him, all you peoples. For great is His love toward us, and the faithfulness of the LORD endures forever." I see the fulfillment of this calling through the nations around the world, who believe in the God of Abraham, Isaac and Jacob, to recite Psalms 113–118 on Israel's Independence Day with the Jewish community. Therefore, I've recently launched the Day to Praise initiative inviting the Christian world to recite Psalms 113–118 with us.

Day to Praise produced songs inspired by the Hallel psalms as part of worship preparations. A portion of the proceeds from the songs went to Heart to Heart, a virtual blood donation program in Israel.

The initiative caused an uproar within Haredi Jewish circles. In a statement, the once-chief Sephardi rabbi of Israel and Chief Rabbi of Jerusalem Shlomo Amar noted "stomach-churning" reactions in light of the joint Jewish–Christian Hallel recitation—led by Rabbi Riskin—in a synagogue in Jerusalem. In a rebuttal, Rabbi Riskin defended his actions, stating, "We are talking about a thanksgiving prayer to God that would include Christians who worship His actions towards the Jewish people and the Land of Israel ... What could possibly be more appropriate?" Later that year, in September, on the eve of Rosh Hashanah, Riskin's claim was given further backing by Rabbi Pesach Wolicki. In an article for The Times of Israel, Wolicki wrote, "While discomfort is understandable, we dare not assume that what is uncomfortable and new is therefore forbidden."

The first annual Day to Praise was on 23 April 2015, with the central event held at HaZvi Israel Synagogue in Jerusalem. The central event was reportedly joined by tens of thousands of worshipers worldwide, in their own respective groups.

Later in 2015, during Sukkot, CJCUC, with Riskin and the chief rabbi of Efrat, hosted an interfaith event in Efrat with a similar theme. Riskin expressed his hope that the interfaith unity would encourage God to usher in the Messianic Age.

=== In 2016 ===
The second Day to Praise occurred on 12 May 2016, and the central event was held in Gush Etzion. The event consisted of 120 representatives from Jewish groups and Christian denominations from Israel, the United States, Germany, Brazil, and international interfaith organizations, such as Bridges for Peace and Christian Friends of Israel.

During the event, participants read Psalm 117 in their native languages, then recited it together in Hebrew. According to co-founder David Nekrutman, the gathering fulfilled a prophecy delivered by Zephaniah (צְפַנְיָה, Ṣep̄anyā) in Zephaniah 3:9:

For then will I make the peoples pure of speech, so that they all invoke GOD by name and render service with one accord (RJPS).

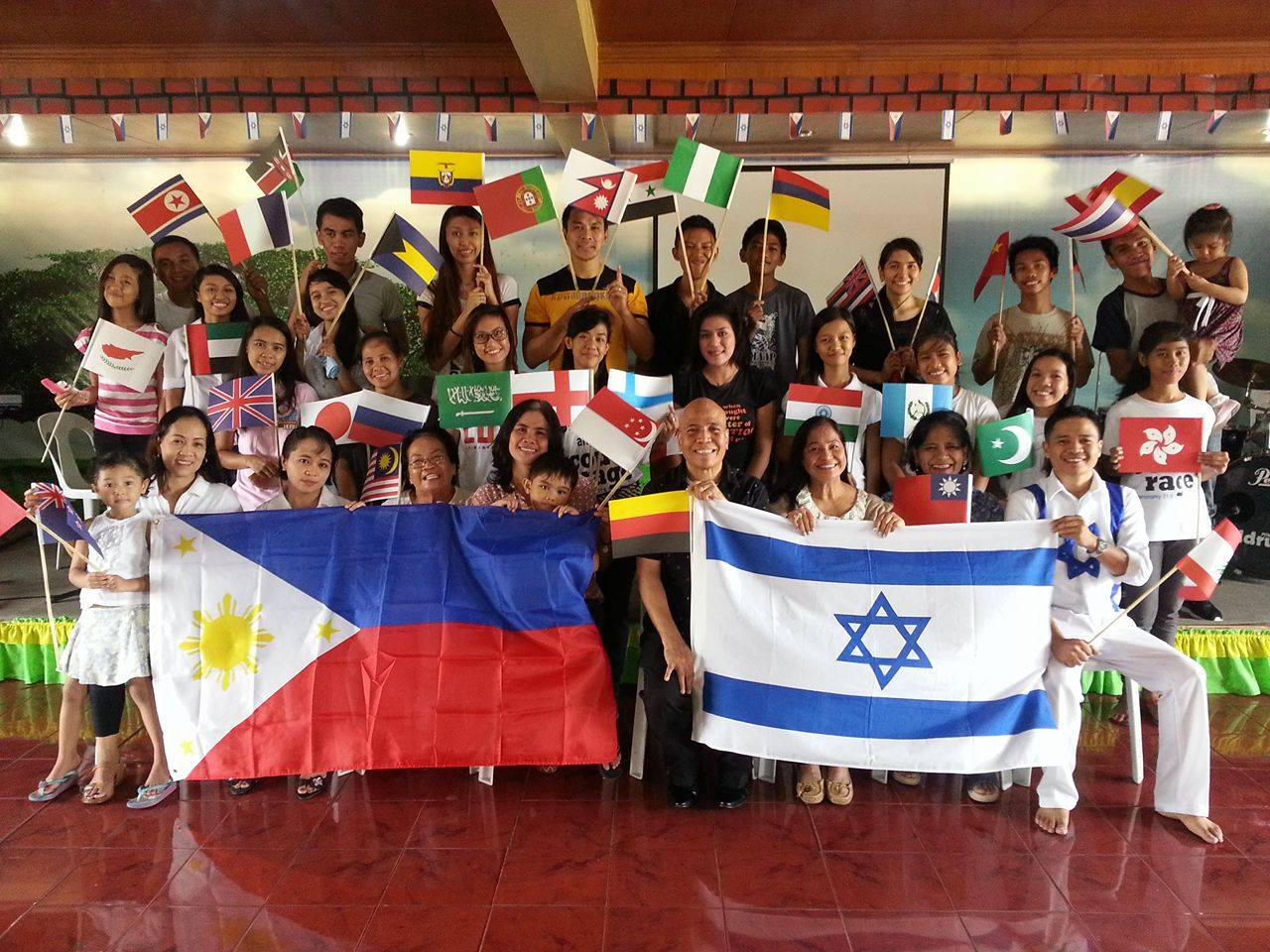
Bishop Armando Cruzem and his congregation at their local Day to Praise event in the Philippines, 12 May 2016

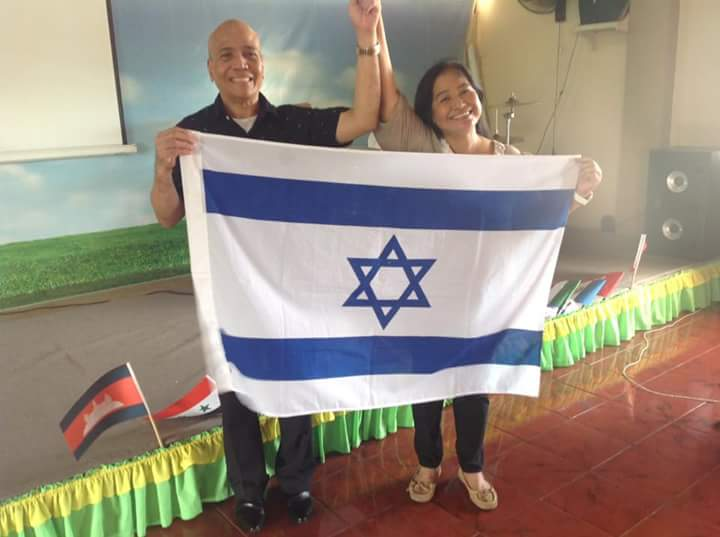
Bishop Armando Cruzem and his wife Joy at their local Day to Praise event in the Philippines, 12 May 2016

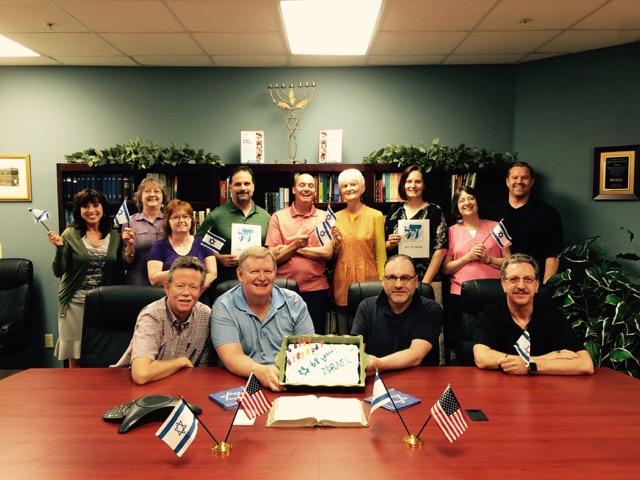
The "Bridges for Peace" branch in Melbourne, Florida at their local Day to Praise event, 12 May 2016

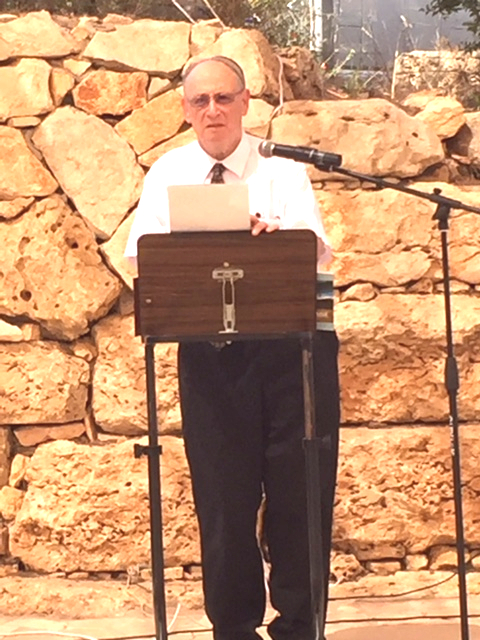
Rabbi Alan Yuter speaking at the central Day to Praise event, 12 May 2016

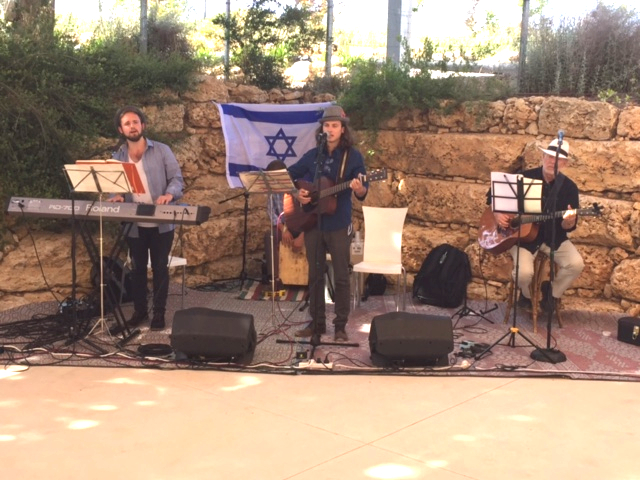
The Portnoy Brothers at the central Day to Praise event, 12 May 2016

=== In 2017 ===
The third annual Day to Praise took place on 2 May 2017, and the central event was held in Jerusalem. As per tradition, the Jewish and Christian attendees recited Psalms 113–118, joined by hundreds worldwide. Co-founder David Nekrutman highlighted the theme of mutual understanding and unity. This event also marked the golden jubilee of the reunification of Jerusalem. A week beforehand, a Day to Praise Hallel service was held in Germany by a group of 125 Christians. It was also reported that a few days later, the synagogue in Youngstown, Ohio, invited Christians to join them for a Hallel service.

=== In 2018 ===
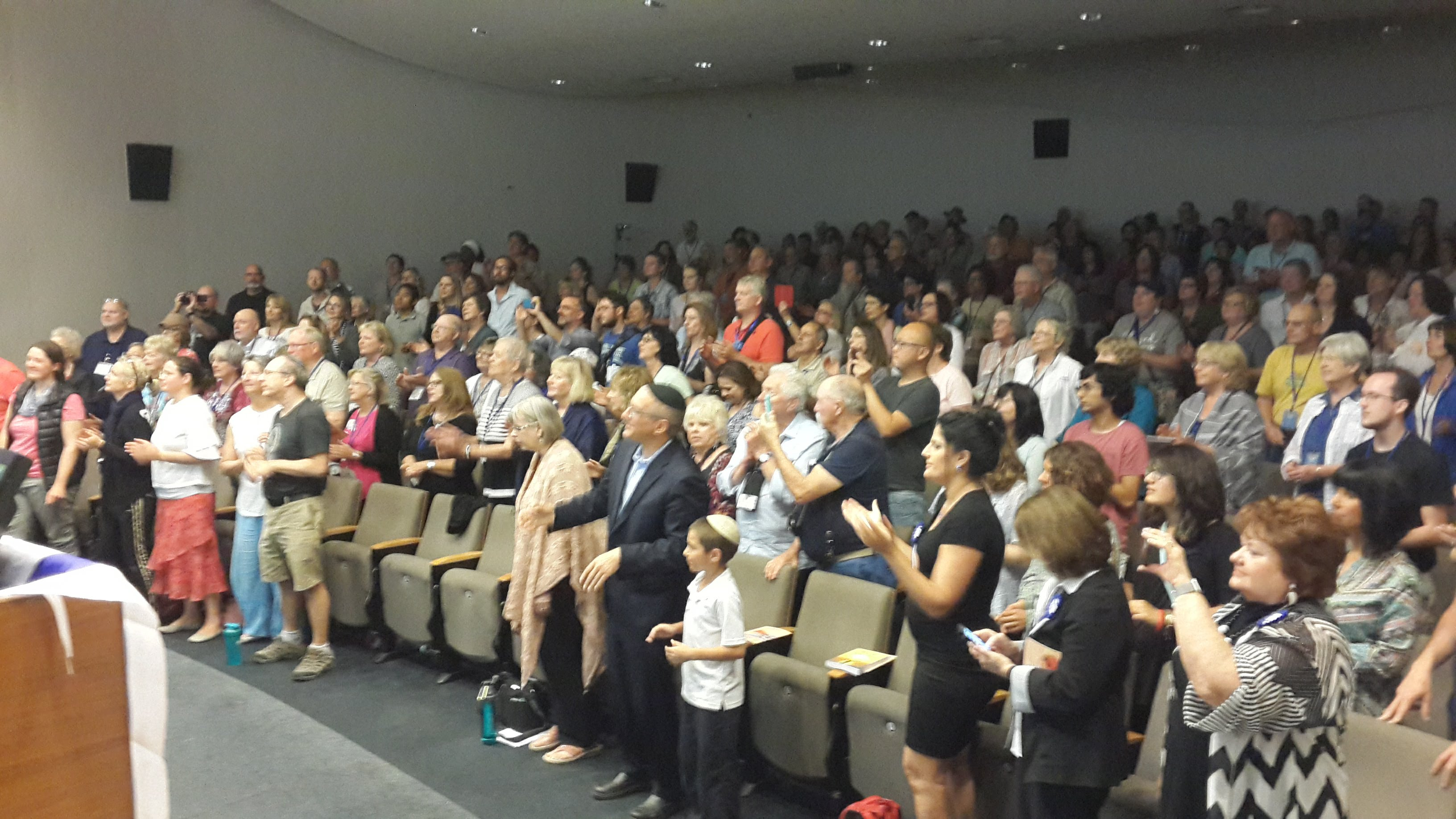
Attendees at the 4th-annual Day to Praise Israeli Independence Day event (18 April 2018)

The fourth Day to Praise was on 19 April 2018. The central event was held on the eve of 18 April and began with a Yom Hazikaron (Memorial Day) ceremony for fallen Israeli soldiers. Jews and Christians joined together in an event which "took them from the depths of sadness over Israel’s losses in wars for survival, to the heights of joy on Israel’s 70th anniversary". The year's event was held at the John Hagee Center for Jewish Heritage at the Netanya Academic College, where roughly 350 Jews and Christians were in attendance. As with every Day to Praise event, attendees recited the full Hallel. Associate director of CJCUC Rabbi Pesach Wolicki stated that Christians praising God and praying for Israel is "an essential piece of the prophetic puzzle" and that without them, the prophecies about Israel's future ge’ulah (גְאוּלָה, 'redemption') would not be complete.
