= Hallel =

Jewish prayer of thanksgiving

Hallel (Hebrew: הַלֵּל, 'Praise') is a Jewish prayer, a verbatim recitation from Psalms 113–118 which is recited by observant Jews on Jewish holidays as an act of praise and thanksgiving.

== Types ==
=== Full Hallel ===
Full Hallel (Hebrew: הלל שלם, romanized: Hallel shalem, lit. 'complete Hallel') consists of all six Psalms of the Hallel, in their entirety. It is a Jewish prayer recited on the first two nights and days of Pesach (only the first night and day in Israel), on Shavuot, all seven days of Sukkot, on Shemini Atzeret and Simchat Torah, and on the eight days of Hanukkah. The sages have provided a "siman" (a way to remember) the days when full Hallel is recited. It is called "BeBeTaCh".

A blessing is recited at the beginning and end of Full Hallel.

=== Partial Hallel ===
Partial Hallel (Hebrew: חצי הלל, romanized: chatzi Hallel, lit. 'half Hallel') omits parts of the Full Hallel: The first 11 verses of both Psalms 115 and 116 are omitted. In Yemenite Jewish custom, additional passages are omitted: Psalm 117, and Psalm 118:1–4.

Partial Hallel is recited on the last six days of Pesach and on Rosh Chodesh. On these days Hallel was originally not recited at all, and the partial recitation indicates that it is only done by later custom rather than to fulfill a requirement. Regarding Passover, the Talmud argues that Full Hallel is only recited on days when the Temple sacrifice differed from the previous day's, while the sacrifice for all days of Passover was identical. Other sources suggest a different reason: that Full Hallel is omitted on the seventh day of Passover in consideration of the Egyptians who died during the Crossing the Red Sea, and omitted on the middle days of Passover so that they not overshadow the seventh day. Regarding Rosh Chodesh, the Talmud states that Hallel is only required on days on which work is forbidden, which is not the case on Rosh Chodesh.

While Ashkenazi Jews recite a blessing at the beginning and end of Partial Hallel, some Sephardic Jews do not, and the few Sephardic communities that do recite a blessing on half Hallel (Moroccans and Spanish & Portuguese Jews, as well as some others) recite likro et hahallel (to read the Hallel, as is always recited by contemporary Ashkenazim) on Half Hallel, as opposed to the blessing ligmor et hahallel (to complete the Hallel) that they recite on Full Hallel.

== Occasions ==
Hallel consists of six Psalms (113–118), which are recited as a unit, on joyous occasions including the each day of the Three Pilgrimage Festivals (Passover, Shavuot, and Sukkot), as well as at Hanukkah and Rosh Chodesh.

On all these occasions, Hallel is recited as part of the morning Shacharit prayer service, following the Amidah. In addition, it is recited in many communities during the evening prayers on the first (and, outside Israel, second) night of Pesach; however, according to the original Nusach Ashkenaz it is not recited at this time, and thus it is not recited in communities such as Litvaks (although most Litvish communities in Israel do recite it) and Yekkes. It is recited in all communities during the Passover Seder service. According to the Talmud, there was a dispute between the Houses of Hillel and Shammai regarding the reading of Hallel during the Seder. According to the school of Shammai, only the first psalm (Ps. 113) should be read before the meal, whereas the school of Hillel advocated reading the first two psalms (Ps. 113 and 114). The remaining Psalms would be said after the Grace After Meals (as is usually the case, the halacha follows the school of Hillel).

On Rosh Hashanah and Yom Kippur, Hallel is not said at all, because as the Talmud states: "Is it seemly for the king to be sitting on His Throne of Judgment, with the Books of Life and Death open before Him, and for the people to sing joyful praises to Him?"

No Hallel is recited on Purim, despite the fact that there was a miraculous salvation. The Talmud suggests three reasons for this:

- The miracle did not occur in the Land of Israel and, for "lesser" holidays, only those occurring in Israel merit the recitation of Hallel.
- The redemption was not complete: after the Miracle of Purim, Jews remained subjects of the Achaemenid Empire (whereas on Hanukkah, Jews gained their independence from the Seleucid Empire).
- Reading the Book of Esther is considered a form of Hallel.

Partial Hallel is recited on the last six days of Passover and on Rosh Chodesh. On all other occasions when Hallel is recited, the text is the full Hallel.

Many Jewish communities, especially those which identify with religious Zionism, recite Hallel on Israeli Independence Day and some also recite it on Jerusalem Day. The Chief Rabbinate of Israel instructs Jews to recite Hallel during Israeli Independence Day.

== Other Hallel sequences ==
The name "Hallel" is normally applied to Psalms 113–118. For greater specificity this is sometimes called the Egyptian Hallel (Hallel Miẓri). This name is due to its mention of the Exodus from Egypt in Psalms 114:1.

=== Great Hallel ===
The term Great Hallel (Hallel HaGadol) is used to refer to Psalm 136; according to other opinions in the Talmud, Great Hallel refers to either Psalms 135–136 or 134–136. Each verse of Psalm 136 concludes with the refrain "for his mercy endures forever" and it contains mention of twenty-six acts of Divine kindness and sustenance for the world. It is recited at the Passover Seder after the standard Hallel is completed. It is also said in the expanded pesukei dezimra on the morning of Shabbat and festivals. In the Talmudic era, if rain fell on the morning of a fast day that was declared in response to a drought, this was seen as a sign of Divine favor, in which case "the Great Hallel" was added in the afternoon prayers. There is mention in some references that this Psalm may also be used antiphonally in Temple worship.

Psalm 136 was most probably used antiphonally in Temple worship. In Jewish liturgy, the Great Hallel is recited at the Passover Seder after the Lesser Hallel. All through the refrain is a repeated reference to the Lord's steadfast love (see Hosea 2:19). This psalm is a hymn that opens with a call to praise God because of God's great deeds in nature and God's gracious historical actions in the history of Israel. It continues expressing God's mercy toward all and ends with another call to praise God.

=== Pesukei dezimra ===
Pesukei dezimra is also described by the Talmud as a kind of Hallel.

== Musical settings ==
In the Jewish tradition, there are well established and various melodies for the singing of Hallel. Some of the psalms are sung while others are recited silently or under the breath.

In the classical tradition, psalms from the Hallel have been set to music many times, notably:

- Psalm 114
  - Mendelssohn
  - Josquin des Prez
- Psalm 115
  - Johann Sebastian Bach in Cantata BWV 196, Der Herr denket an uns, using verses 12–15
- Psalm 117
  - Antonio Vivaldi
  - Mozart
- Psalm 118
  - Léonin
  - Pérotin

American composer and conductor Michael Isaacson has composed a full Hallel for SATB chorus, entitled An American Hallel, with interpolations of expressions of praise and gratitude by past and present Americans. It was premiered by the Carolina Master Chorale under the directorship of Tim Koch in the autumn of 2009.

Composer/performer Sam Glaser has also set the Psalms on his CD Hallel.

== New Testament ==
The New Testament accounts of the Last Supper state that Jesus and his disciples "sang a psalm" or "hymn" after the meal before leaving for the Mount of Olives (Matthew 26:30, Mark 14:26), which may have been the Hallel. The Last Supper is popularly considered to have been a celebration of the Passover, although this is controversial among scholars. Jesus, like any other literate Jew in the first century, may well have known how to chant the Psalms in Hebrew, especially the famous Hallel psalms which were an integral part of the Passover.

== See also ==
- Biblical poetry
- Day to Praise
- Hallelujah
- List of Jewish prayers and blessings
- Takbir
