= LifeLight Music Festival =

Music festival in South Dakota, US

- Genre: Free Family Friendly Christian Festival
- Dates: Labor Day weekend
- Locations: Sioux Falls, South Dakota (1998–2009); Worthing, South Dakota (2010–2019) Downtown, Sioux Falls, South Dakota (2023) Nelson Park, Sioux Falls, South Dakota (2024–present)
- Years active: 1998–2019, 2023–present
- Founders: Alan and Vicki Greene
- Website: lifelight.org

LifeLight Festival is an annual free outdoor Christian music festival held over Labor Day weekend in Sioux Falls, South Dakota.

== History ==
LifeLight Festival was started by Alan and Vicki Greene in 1998 as an afternoon concert at Good News Reformed Church on Valley View Rd, drawing about 2,000 people. By 2001, the festival was moved to the W.H. Lyons Fairgrounds in Sioux Falls to accommodate the growing crowds. In 2002, attendance tripled from the year before, growing to 32,000 attendees over a 3-day weekend. LifeLight has since grown to over 320,000 attendees over a 3-day weekend, expanding to six stages, with a budget of nearly $700,000 each year. After outgrowing previous locations, the LifeLight festival found a new permanent home for the Festival on a family farm near Worthing, South Dakota. The 2010 Festival was the first at the new location. It is a free concert but provides a great economic boost to Sioux Falls. Festivals like this one said to bring up to $10 million. Since 2005, LifeLight has also sponsored spring and fall tours featuring LifeLight artists. They started as local tours with primarily local artists but over the years, LifeLight Tours has partnered with several national and regional bands/speakers and now travel well beyond the Midwest for tour dates. Past tours have featured artists John Reuben, Brian Welch, Sanctus Real, Phil Joel, Disciple, Project 86, Children 18:3 and many more and traveled to cities in Texas, Illinois, Nebraska, Colorado, Minnesota, Iowa, and South Dakota as well as other states. The 2013 festival in South Dakota hosted main showings of Plumb, Newsboys, Audio Adrenaline, and Skillet.

No festival was held in 2020-2022 due to the Coronavirus Pandemic

In 2023, the festival was held at the 8th & railroad district parking lot in downtown Sioux Falls. Despite temperatures of over 100 degrees, 30,000 people attended. In 2024 the festival is to be held at Nelson Park in eastern Sioux Falls to increase capacity.

== Attendance ==
- 1998: 1,500
- 1999: 4,000
- 2000: 6,500
- 2001: 10,000
- 2002: 32,000
- 2003: 110,000
- 2004: 240,000
- 2005: 275,000
- 2006: 263,000
- 2007: 320,000
- 2008: 320,000
- 2009: 270,000
- 2010: 320,000

== Artists ==
=== 2013 Festival ===
- For Today
- Plumb
- The Red Jumpsuit Apparatus
- Levi the Poet
- Flyleaf
- Building 429
- Newsboys
- Rhett Walker Band
- Audio Adrenaline
- Fireflight
- We Are Leo
- Phinehas
- Unarmed For Victory
- At The Wayside
- Aaron Gillespie
- Children 18:3
- The City Harmonic
- One Accord
- Sean Michel
- Ravenhill
- Spencer Kane
- From The Eyes of Servants
- Love Out Loud
- John Reuben
- Je'kob
- Shuree
- Disciple
- Lybecker
- Tru Serva
- Double Vision
- Grant Lockner
- Rapture Ruckus

=== 2012 Festival ===
- Tenth Avenue North
- Skillet
- Peter Furler
- Five Iron Frenzy
- House of Heroes
- Sanctus Real
- Leeland
- Mandisa
- Christy Nockels
- Downhere
- Run Kid Run
- The City Harmonic
- Remedy Drive
- Becoming the Archetype
- Andy Mineo
- Aaron Gillespie
- Everyday Sunday
- Abandon Kansas
- Sleeping Giant
- KB
- John Rueben
- The Wedding
- Wolves at the Gate
- Children 18:3
- Jenny & Tyler
- Write This Down
- Love & Death
- One Sonic Society
- These Hearts
- Matt Hammitt
- GoFish
- Silverline
- Stephanie Smith
- Kiros
- Everfound
- Fades Away
- We Are Leo
- Ilia
- Willet
- An Epic No Less
- George Moss
- The Skies Revolt
- Loftland
- Classic Petra
- Broken Walls
- Marah in the Mainsail
- Triple Stitch
- Brandon Reid
- Alan Greene
- Rachelle Hope
- Brian Sumner
- Tom Henderson
- Josh Brewer

=== 2011 Festival ===
Main Stage:

- Relient K
- Tenth Avenue North
- Jeremy Camp
- Sidewalk Prophets
- Britt Nicole
- Manafest
- Hawk Nelson
- Fireflight
- Manic Drive

-Souled Out Stage:

- Disciple
- Blindside
- Write This Down
- Children 18:3
- The Wedding

=== 2010 Festival ===
- Abandon
- BarlowGirl
- Brian "Head" Welch
- Children 18:3
- Colossus
- David Crowder Band
- Day of Fire
- Disciple
- Eric Timm
- Everyday Sunday
- Family Force 5
- From The Eyes Of Servants
- House of Heroes
- John Mark McMillan
- John Reuben
- Kari Jobe
- MercyMe
- Mikeschair
- Parachute Band
- Reilly
- Seabird
- Showbread
- Silverline
- Spoken
- These Hearts
- The Overseer
- Triple Stitch and More
- White Collar Sideshow
- Willet
- Write This Down

=== 2009 Festival ===
A Life Echoed
Children 18:3
David Lunsford
DecembeRadio
Disciple
Downhere
Esterlyn (band)
Everyday Sunday
Everfound
Family Force 5
FM Static
House of Heroes
John Reuben
Krystal Meyers
Kutless
Life's Breath
Lincoln Brewster
Manic Drive
Michael Gungor Band
Nevertheless
Newsboys
Remedy Drive
Run Kid Run
Rush of Fools
Sanctus Real
Sarah Reeves
Seventh Day Slumber
Showbread
Silverline
Spoken
Stellar Kart
Superchick
Thousand Foot Krutch
Tenth Avenue North
The Switch Kids
The Wedding
TruEmotion
VOTA
WILLET

=== 2008 Festival ===
Headliners of the 2008 festival, as announced on Life 96.5, were Switchfoot, Michael W. Smith and Casting Crowns. Other 2008 participating bands included:

33Miles
Ayiesha Woods
As I Lay Dying
Building 429
Day of Fire
Everyday Sunday
Family Force 5
Grits
John Reuben
Leeland
Lincoln Brewster
Matthew West
MxPx
Natalie Grant
Phil Joel
Remedy Drive
Sanctus Real
Seventh Day Slumber
Showbread The Afters
This Beautiful Republic
VOTA

=== 2007 Festival ===
Jars of Clay, TobyMac and Chris Tomlin were announced as the headliners of the 2007 festival. Other major bands and artists for 2007 included:
Anberlin
BarlowGirl
Big Daddy Weave
Casting Pearls
Family Force 5
Leeland
Tait
Phil Joel
Project 86
Stellar Kart

=== Previous Bands/Speakers ===
Audio Adrenaline
Casting Crowns
Day of Fire
Dr. James Dobson
FFH
GoFish
Jeremy Camp
Mark Schultz
Newsboys
Pillar
Point of Grace
Rebecca St. James
Relient K
Rick Warren
Salvador
Sanctus Real
Skillet
Steven Curtis Chapman
Superchick
Switchfoot
Third Day
Thousand Foot Krutch
Three Cord Wonder
Tree63
