= List of Midrashot =

List of Midrasha and seminary programs:

See also List of yeshivas, midrashas and Hebrew schools in Israel#Midrashas.

== Israel and West Bank, currently in operation ==
Those in the West Bank are marked 'WB', those in East Jerusalem are marked 'EJ'.

=== Ashdod ===
- Midreshet AMIT Be'er Asdod, Ashdod

=== Bat Ayin (WB) ===
- Midreshet B'erot Bat Ayin, Bat Ayin ()

=== Beit Shemesh/Ramat Beit Shemesh ===
In Beit Shemesh and Ramat Beit Shemesh:

- Bnos Chana ()
- Machon Maayan ()
- Tiferet (seminary) ()

=== Ein HaNatziv ===
- Midreshet Ein HaNatziv, Ein HaNatziv

=== Elkana (WB) ===
- Michlelet Orot, Elkana

=== Hebron (WB) ===
- Midreshet Hebron, Hebron ()

=== Jerusalem ===
In Jerusalem (West and East):

==== Bayit VeGan ====
In Bayit VeGan:

- Afikei Torah ()
- Darchei Binah ()
- Midreshet Moriah ()

==== Gilo (EJ) ====
In Gilo:

- Midreshet AMIT ()

==== Givat Shaul ====
In Givat Shaul:

- Tal Institute a.k.a. Machon Tal/Midreshet Ma'amakim (; Hebrew)

==== Har Nof ====
In Har Nof:

- Ba'er Miriam ()

==== Neve Yerushalayim ====
In Neve Yerushalayim:

- Binas Bais Yaakov Seminary ( )
- Bnos Chava ()
- Me'ohr Bais Yaakov ()
- Michlelet Esther ()
- Midreshet Tehillah

==== Kiryat HaYovel ====
In Kiryat HaYovel:

- Emunah V'Omanut ()
- Midreshet Yeud ()

==== Kiryat Moshe ====
In Kiryat Moshe:

- Midreshet Rachel V’Chaya ()
- Pninim ()

==== Malha ====
In Malha:

- Sha'alvim for Women ()
- She'arim College of Jewish Studies for Women ()

==== Mattersdorf ====
In Mattersdorf:

- Beth Jacob Jerusalem
- Havineini Bais Yaakov Seminary ()

==== Old City (EJ) ====
In the Old City:

- Midreshet HaRova
- Machon Roni ()

==== Pat ====
In Pat:

- Nishmat ()

==== Ramat Eshkol (EJ) ====
In Ramat Eshkol:

- Bnot Torah a.k.a. Sharfman's ()

==== Ramat Shlomo (EJ) ====
In Ramat Shlomo:

- Machon Shoshanat Yerushalayim ()

==== Ramot (EJ) ====
In Ramot:

- Tikva (seminary) ()
- Tomer Devorah ()

==== Romema ====
In Romema:

==== Talpiot ====
In Talpiot:

- Midreshet Lindenbaum ()

==== Zichron Moshe ====
In Zichron Moshe:

- Ohr Chaya

=== Kiryat Malakhi ===
- Nachlas Har Chabad, Kiryat Malakhi ()

=== Migdal Oz (WB) ===
- Migdal Oz (seminary), Migdal Oz ()

=== Ofra (WB) ===
- Midreshet Shuva, Ofra ()

=== Shvut Rachel (WB) ===
- Midreshet Binat, Shvut Rachel

=== Tel Aviv ===
- Midreshet Aviv, Tel Aviv ()

=== Tsfat ===
- Machon Alte ()
- Sharei Bina ()

=== Yerucham ===
- Midreshet AMIT Be'er Yerucham

== Israel and West Bank, currently closed ==
- Bnot Shilo (WB)
- Machon Gold

== United States ==
- Berkeley, California
- Oakland, California
- Contra Costa, California
- Tri-Valley/Tri-Cities, California
