= Beth Rivkah =

Chabad girls' school

Location
- Brooklyn, New York; United States; 40°39′58″N 73°56′59″W

Information
- Type: Private school
- Established: 1941
- Grades: K-12
- Enrollment: 2,000
- Website: bethrivkah.edu

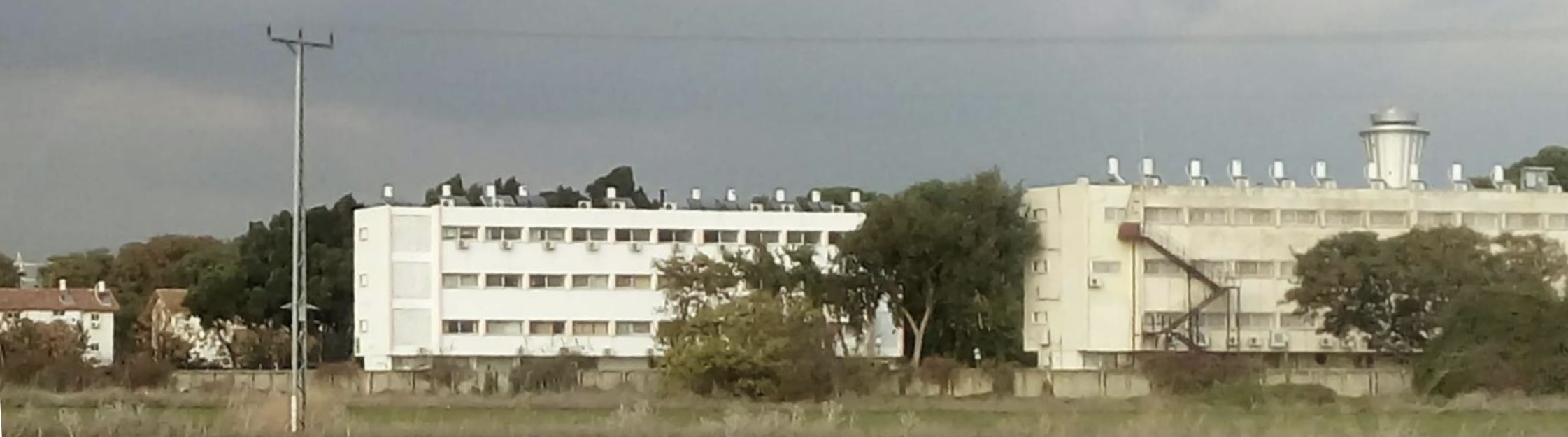
Beth Rivkah, Kfar Chabad

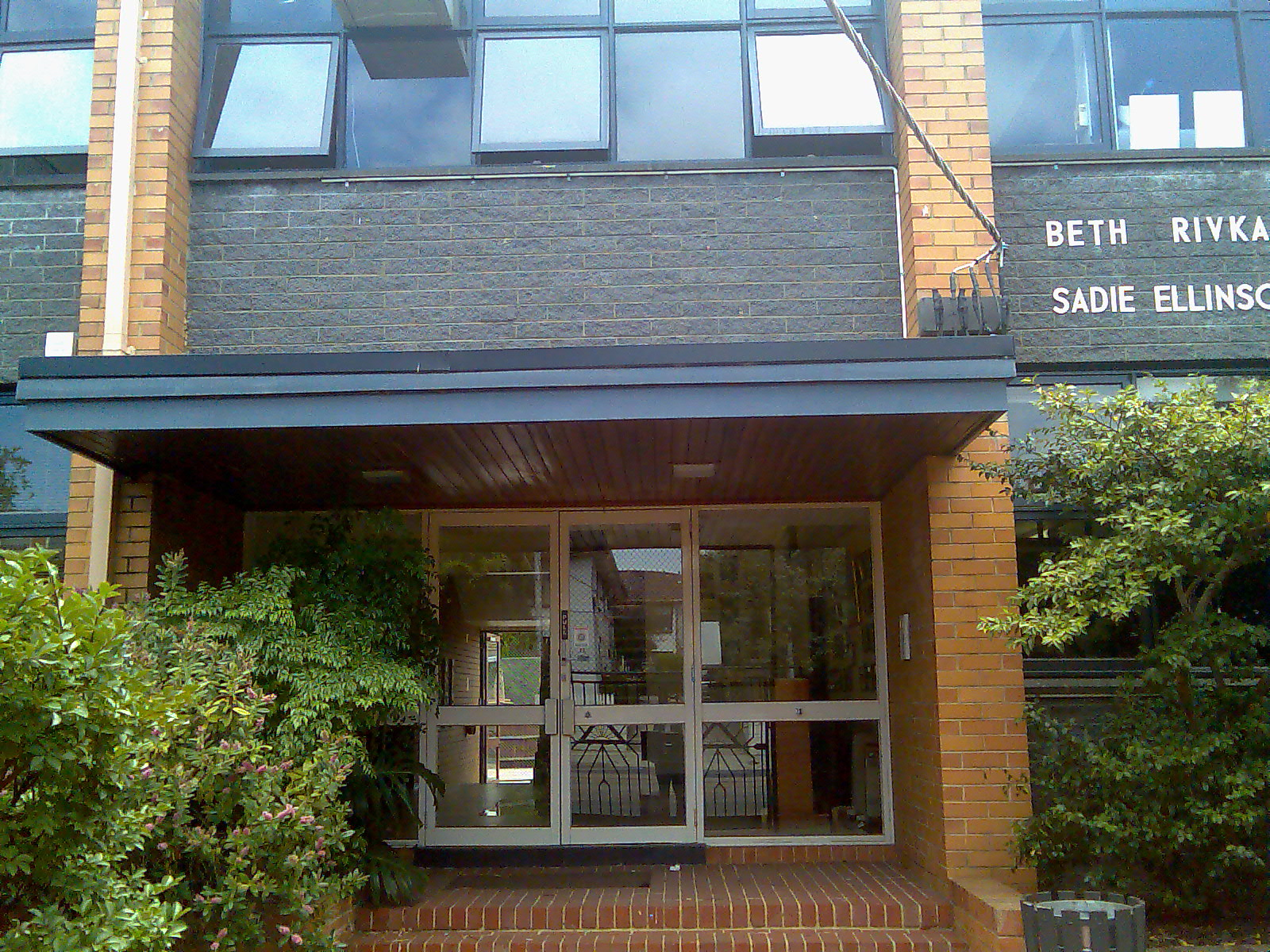
Beth Rivkah, Melbourne

Beth Rivkah (Hebrew: בית רבקה, Bais Rivkah, lit. "House of Rebecca"), formally known as Associated Beth Rivkah Schools, is a private girls' school system affiliated with the Chabad Lubavitch Hasidic movement.

It was established in 1941 by Rabbi Yosef Yitzchak Schneersohn, the sixth Lubavitcher Rebbe, and developed by his son-in-law, Rabbi Menachem Mendel Schneerson, the seventh Lubavitcher Rebbe. The flagship school in Crown Heights, Brooklyn, includes an early childhood division, elementary school, high school, and a teacher training seminary. Other branches are located in Montreal, Quebec, Canada; Yerres, France; Melbourne, Australia; Casablanca, Morocco; and Kfar Chabad, Israel.

Many Lubavitcher girls attend the Beth Rivkah school system from first through twelfth grades. Students at the one- to two-year, post-high-school teacher training seminary have the option of earning a teaching certificate, which can be used in both Chabad and non-Chabad Jewish schools.

== Name ==
The sixth Lubavitcher Rebbe named Beth Rivkah after his grandmother, Rebbetzin Rivkah Schneersohn, wife of the fourth Lubavitcher Rebbe, Rabbi Shmuel Schneersohn.

== Location ==
Beth Rivkah of Crown Heights is spread over two campuses. The early childhood center (including a Head Start Program) and elementary school are located at Campus Chomesh at 470 Lefferts Avenue. The high school, teacher training seminary, and administrative offices are located at 310 Crown Street.

== History ==
The Beth Rivkah elementary school for girls was established by Rabbi Yosef Yitzchok Schneersohn in Brooklyn, New York, in 1941, two years after he founded the first boys' yeshiva in that city. The initial enrollment of about 30 students met in a rented storefront. The high school was established in 1955, and the teacher training seminary opened in Crown Heights in 1960.

The elementary and high school divisions experienced significant growth from the late 1950s to the 1970s due to the high birthrate among Lubavitcher families, and the influx of Soviet and Iranian Jewish refugees to New York City. By the early 1980s, enrollment exceeded 600 students.

In 1988 the seventh Lubavitcher Rebbe presided at a groundbreaking ceremony for Campus Chomesh, which he established as a memorial to his Rebbetzin, Chaya Mushka Schneerson, who had died that year. The four-story, 125,000 square feet (11,600 m^{2}) campus occupies the site of the former Lefferts General Hospital and two adjacent structures, covering nearly one city block. The campus accommodates over 2,000 students with close to 100 classrooms, as well as science labs, computer centers, libraries, a sports gymnasium, and a rooftop playground. Philanthropist Ronald Perelman provided nearly half of the $15 million funding for the campus, which opened in 1995.

== Curriculum ==
School is in session six days a week, excluding Shabbat (Saturday), with a half-day scheduled on Fridays to accommodate Shabbat preparations. The school day runs from 9 am to 4 pm, with a half-hour break for lunch. Judaic studies – including Bible, Midrash, Jewish law, Jewish history, Hebrew, Yiddish, and the writings of the Chabad Rebbes – are taught in the mornings. Secular subjects such as English, mathematics, geography, science, and American history are taught in the afternoons. While in previous decades the language of instruction was Yiddish, the school now teaches religious subjects in Hebrew and secular subjects in English. Yiddish is taught as a second language. An optional Yiddish track is offered in first grade.

As a private school certified by the State of New York, Beth Rivkah is required to teach science (biology and chemistry), history (U.S. and world history), English literature, and mathematics (algebra, geometry, and trigonometry), among other subjects. For fifth-grade science and sixth-grade world history, however, Chabad educators eschew state-mandated booklets and textbooks and instead use material that they collect from a variety of sources in order to comply with the Hasidic movement's religious beliefs. In high school, where students are required by the New York Board of Regents to study from specific textbooks, teachers append their own notations to pages describing theories such as the Big Bang and evolution to inform students of what they consider the Torah point of view on these topics. Novels read in English literature classes are also vetted for compliance with Chabad philosophy and religious beliefs.

Beth Rivkah teachers employ pedagogical techniques such as "group work, cooperative learning, and multiple-intelligence methods", and attend both regional and national workshops sponsored by Chabad to improve their pedagogical methods.

== Summer camp ==
The Crown Heights school runs a 7-week day camp on the premises each summer for preschool through seventh grade. The camp is divided into three divisions: Kiddie Camp (Pre-1A), Younger Division (Grades 1 and 2) and Older Division (Grades 3 through 7).

== Student body ==
Beth Rivkah accepts all students regardless of religious affiliation or educational background. It also accepts students who cannot afford full tuition. The school has weathered financial shortfalls due to its tuition policy. In September 2014, the Pre-1A, elementary and high school divisions did not open on time for the fall semester due to financial difficulties; the early childhood center, which is government-funded, was not affected.

Beth Rivkah has a dress code. In addition to a school uniform, jewelry and grooming guidelines are enforced in accordance with the laws of tzniut (modesty).

In 2012, the Crown Heights school ordered students to delete their Facebook accounts or face expulsion.

Since many girls are named Chaya Mushka after the Rebbetzin of the seventh Lubavitcher Rebbe, teachers call on students by their surnames.

== Branches ==
The seventh Lubavitcher Rebbe, Rabbi Menachem Mendel Schneerson, founded other branches of Beth Rivkah in Yerres, France; Montreal, Quebec, Canada; Melbourne, Australia; Casablanca, Meknes, and Sefrou, Morocco; and Kfar Chabad, Israel in the 1940s and 1950s. By 1967, there were 98 Beth Rivkah schools worldwide, with an enrollment of 40,000 students.

=== Yerres, France ===
The Beth Rivkah school in the Paris neighborhood of Yerres opened in 1947. It consists of an early childhood division, elementary school, high school, and seminary for girls. There is also a cheder for boys. As of 2015, the total enrollment is 600 students.

=== Montreal ===
Beth Rivkah Academy of Montreal opened in 1956. In 1967 it opened a facility for 500 students, with dormitory accommodations for 180. As of 2015, enrollment in the early childhood division, elementary school, and high school is 600 students aged 18 months to 18 years. Approximately 10 percent of students are immigrants, and there is a significant percentage of special-needs students in the elementary and high school divisions. In addition to providing religious and secular studies, the academy is an accredited French-language school.

=== Melbourne ===
The Beth Rivkah Ladies College in Melbourne, Australia was established in 1956. Part of the Yeshivah Centre educational network, which includes the Yeshivah College for boys founded in 1954, the Beth Rivkah Ladies College consists of a preschool, elementary school, and high school for girls. A sister school, Ohel Chana, is a teacher training seminary. Both Beth Rivkah and Yeshivah College enroll students from non-Chabad families. In 2014 the educational network made headlines by capping tuition fees at 8% of family income for low wage-earners and 18% for high wage-earners, notwithstanding how many children in the family are enrolled in the schools.

=== Morocco ===
Beth Rivkah schools were established in Casablanca, Meknes, and Sefrou, Morocco, in the mid-1950s. According to a 1956 survey, these schools had a combined enrollment of 374 students that year. With the migration of Moroccan Jews to Israel and France in the 1950s, the Lubavitch yeshiva for boys, Oholei Yosef Yitzchok, and the Beth Rivkah school for girls were centered in Casablanca and dormitory facilities were opened to accommodate students from other locales. By 1980, the Beth Rivkah school had some 300 students.

=== Israel ===
The Beit Rivkah College in Kfar Chabad, Israel, opened in 1957. Originally a teacher training institute, it evolved into a two-year seminary, and then a teachers college which bestows both B.A. and M.A. degrees. As of 2010, enrollment was 1,000 students in Kfar Chabad and in branches in Jerusalem and Safed. See Midrasha § Certifications.

== See also ==
- Bais Chana Women International
- Bais Yaakov § Hasidic schools
- Hashkafa § Gender roles
- Jewish education § Girls' education
- Midrasha
- Tomchei Tmimim - Chabad's Yeshiva network for men
- Ulpana
- Women in Judaism

== Sources ==
- Aiken, Lisa (2009). The Baal Teshuva Survival Guide. Rossi Publications. ISBN 978-0977962938.
- Fishkoff, Sue (2009). The Rebbe's Army: Inside the World of Chabad-Lubavitch. Knopf Doubleday Publishing Group. ISBN 978-0307566140.
- Laskier, Michael M. (2012). The Alliance Israelite Universelle and the Jewish Communities of Morocco, 1862–1962. SUNY Press. p. 250. ISBN 978-1438410166.
- Lubin, Chaim (1983). "Jewish Schooling and Jewish Education in Melbourne". Journal of Jewish Education. 51 (2): 37–42. doi:10.1080/0021642830510212.
- Morris, Bonnie J. (2012). Lubavitcher Women in America: Identity and Activism in the Postwar Era. SUNY Press. ISBN 978-1438413662.
- Schneersohn, Yosef Yitzchak; Schneerson, Menachem Mendel (2005). HaYom Yom..."From Day to Day" (18th ed.). Kehot. p. A-42. ISBN 978-0826606693.
