= Herzog College =

Israeli teachers' college

Coordinates: 31°39′27.35″N 35°7′22.38″E

- מכללת הרצוג
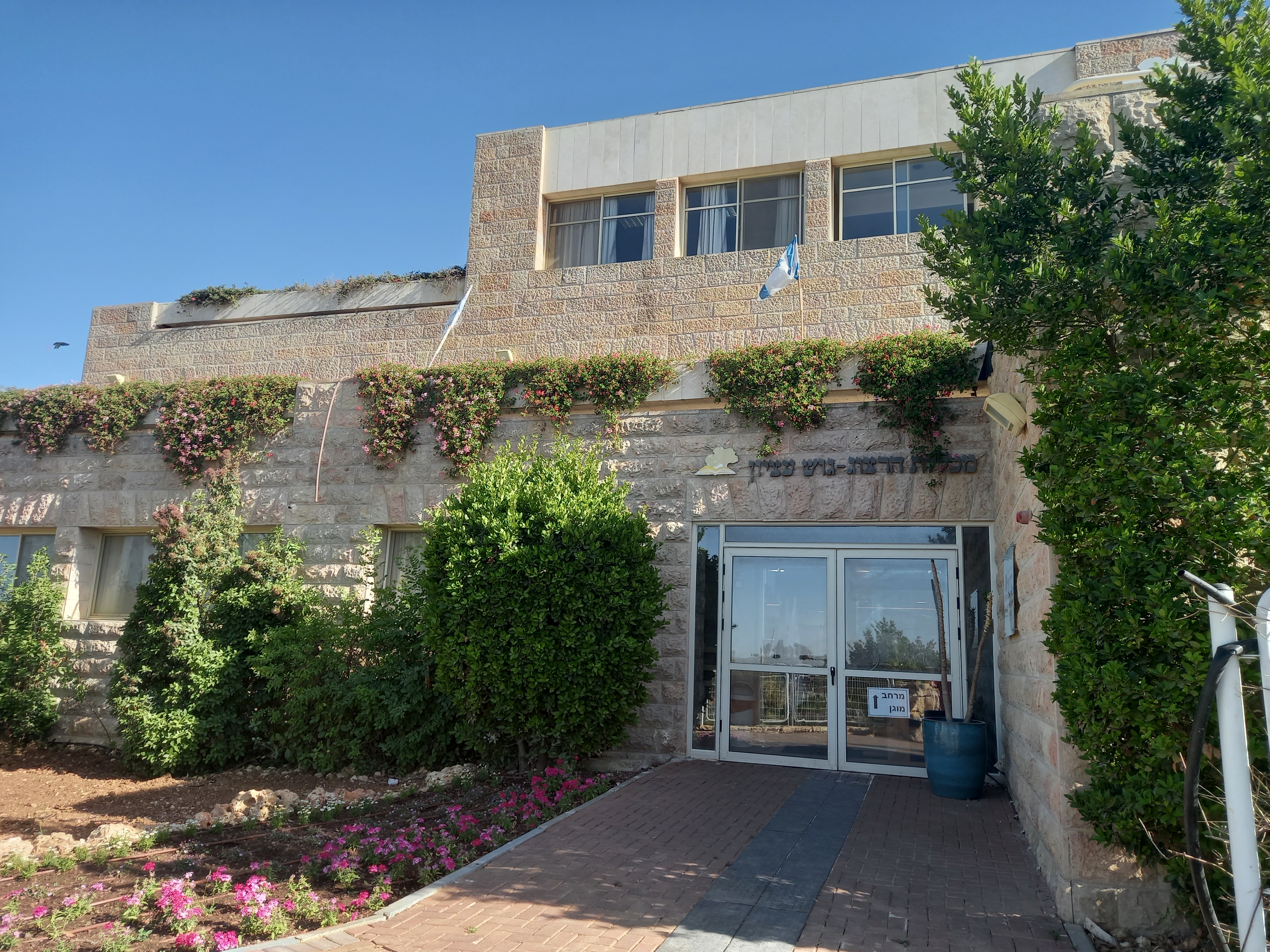
- Established: 1973
- Affiliations: Jewish
- President: Avishalom Westreich
- Location: Jerusalem
- Website: www.herzog.ac.il

Herzog College (Hebrew: מכללת הרצוג, Mikhlelet Herzog) is an Israeli teachers' college with campuses in Jerusalem, Alon Shvut and Migdal Oz.

== History ==
Herzog College is named for Yaakov Herzog, an Israeli diplomat, scholar and son of Israel's second Ashkenazi Chief Rabbi, Yitzhak HaLevi Herzog.

The college is approved by the Council for Higher Education in Israel and offers fully accredited Bachelor of Education and Master of Education degrees in 20 subject tracks. The college president is Rabbi Professor Avishalom Westreich.

Herzog has over 3,500 students, making it one of Israel's largest teacher training colleges. It was established in 1973 in Alon Shvut and merged with Lifshitz College of Education in Jerusalem in 2013.

The college offers 14 subject tracks for Bachelor of Education degrees, taught at campuses in Alon Shvut (for men) and Migdal Oz (for women), and 6 subject tracks for Master of Education degrees, taught at the Jerusalem campus in Heichal Shlomo. The college has an active Research Authority that funds academic research and publishes the series of books on Jewish Studies.

== Teacher training ==
Herzog College provides professional development training for Israeli teachers, and pedagogical support and managerial guidance for schools and education networks throughout the country. The college also provides professional development programs for Jewish Studies teachers and principals of Jewish schools around the world in English, Spanish, and French. Herzog's education technology department creates online adult education courses and applications for use in schools.

Every summer the college holds a 5-day bible study conference (Yemei Iyun B’Tanakh) in Alon Shvut. The conference offers 200 lectures in different languages and field trips to biblical sites around Israel. These lectures are recognized as continuing education for teachers of Jewish Thought and Bible Studies in Israel. The conference is also attended by participants from the U.S., Europe, Australia, including many teachers.

== See also ==
- Education in Israel
- Machon Gold
- Michlala
- Migdal Oz (seminary)
- Tal Institute
- Talpiot College of Education
- Ein HaNatziv Women's Seminary
