= Machon Chana =

Chabad school

Coordinates: 40°39′56″N 73°56′24″W

Machon Chana is a private religious college for Jewish women affiliated with the Chabad Hasidic movement and geared toward Baalot Teshuva – women from secular backgrounds who become more observant. The school is located in the Crown Heights neighborhood of Brooklyn, New York.

== History ==
The school was founded in 1972 as an institution educating women from non-Orthodox backgrounds in an orthodox Jewish environment. The school is open to women of any age, and focuses on Torah study.

The Lubavitcher Rebbe Menachem M. Schneerson saw this institution as a way to introduce young Jewish women from non-orthodox backgrounds to orthodox Judaism through academic means.

== Leadership and goals ==
Sara Labkowski is the founder and executive director of Machon Chana.

The goals of Machon Chana as described in its mission statement are:

...Provide comprehensive Torah education with high academic standards for women of all ages and backgrounds... and imbue them with an appreciation and understanding of Torah and Judaism through the study of Chassidic thought and lifestyle... tools for lifelong personal growth and fulfillment as Jewish women in the family and in society at large.

== Student body ==
Hundreds of women from all over the world study at the school annually. The backgrounds of the women attending the school vary with some arriving not knowing the Hebrew alphabet.

== Programs ==
Machon Chana offers part-time and full-time options for students. Seminary students can study for a few days to years. Students can pursue online or dual degrees including bachelor and master degrees through partnerships with the Yeshiva Initiatives Educational Programs and Bellevue University.

Machon Chana offers classes related to Hebrew, Yiddish, Jewish law, Jewish homes, Jewish ethics, and other topics related to Judaism.

Machon Chana also operates Machon Tmimim, its men's division, which offers a full-time program of advanced Torah, Chassidus, and rabbinic studies for young men in Crown Heights, Brooklyn.

== See also ==
- Baal teshuva movement
- Bais Rivka
- Jewish feminism
- Jewish fundamentalism
- Midrasha
- Orthodox Judaism outreach

== Sources ==
- Morris, Bonnie. "Female education in the Lubavitcher community: The Beth Rivkah and Machon Chana schools" in Women in spiritual and communitarian societies in the United States Wendy Chmielewski, et al., eds. Syracuse, NY, 1993
- Srinivasan, Gita. "Women and Personal Empowerment in Lubavitcher Hasidism" in Encounters with American Ethnic Cultures: Interpretation of Gender and Ethnicity: The Lubavitcher Experience: Strategies for Strength: Kilbride, et al., eds. Tuscaloosa, Alabama, 1990.
