= Eli Ostreicher =

American businessman (1983–2023)

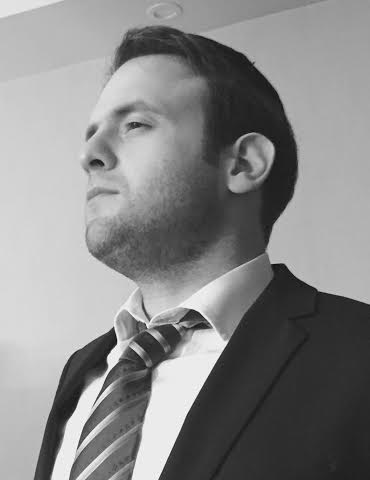
- Born: Moshe Eli; July 1983; London, England
- Died: January 11, 2023 (aged 39); Thailand
- Occupation: Serial entrepreneur
- Years active: 2006–2023
- Employer(s): Founder & CEO to GTTFP Holdings: Regal Wings, Regal Card, Miles 4 Flights, One Bag Tag, VVandr, ThermBot, SHARGE, Luxury Wholesale Flights, PillBot, VVandr & more.
- Notable work: US$500,000 donation to Bonei Olam
- Relatives: Jacob Ostreicher
- Awards: Inc. 500 #1 Fastest-Growing Travel Company, 2013 | Inc. 500 #76 Fastest-Growing Company, 2014 | Crain's New York Fast 50, 2015 & 2016 | Inc. Hire Power Award, 2013 | Under 30 Leader Award, 2010 | Inc. Top 10 NYC Companies, 2016
- Website: https://gttfp.com

Eli Ostreicher (July 1983 – January 11, 2023) was a British-born American serial entrepreneur based in New York City. He was the founder and active CEO of GTTFP Holdings, originally a B2B luxury air-travel provider and Inc. 500 #1 awardee in the United States. GTTFP Holdings now houses Regal Wings, The Regal Card, Regal Jets, Luxury Wholesale Flights, One Bag Tag, VVandr, SHARGE, ThermBot, PillBot; a total of 11 brands.

At the time of his death in early 2023, it was estimated that Ostreicher had created over US$600 million in revenue within GTTFP Holdings.

== Early life, family and education ==
Ostreicher was born in London, England. The family was part of London's Orthodox Jewish community.

Ostreicher's paternal grandmother is the oldest of 16 siblings to her parents, Joseph and Yitta Schwartz. His great-grandmother Yitta Schwartz died at age 93 leaving over 2,000 living descendants; following her funeral, The New York Times ran a feature story, "God Said Multiply, and Did She Ever".

In his early teens, he attended yeshiva in Hitchin; in his later teens, Ostreicher attended SmartTrack, an IT college in London's Lee Valley area, where he received Microsoft MCSE and Cisco CCNA certifications in 2004.

== Career ==
Ostreicher started his business career at the age of 22, opening a small home-based travel agency in Aventura, Florida. In 2006 he moved to New York City and founded Regal Wings. He later expanded the company to 300-plus employees with luxury travel agent services, business travel management and leisure. In 2010, he opened a satellite office of the company in Chennai, India. GTTFP Holdings and its Regal group of brands have offices in New York City, San Francisco, London, Singapore and Shenzhen.

In 2012, Regal Wings was listed in Inc. magazine's as the fastest-growing travel company in the United States with a growth rate of 2,513%. With a further 4,146% growth rate in 2013, the company grossed $54.4 million in revenue. In that year, Ostreicher received Inc. magazine's "Hire Power award" recognizing his role for job creation. In 2014, the company was listed in Inc. magazine's 33rd annual 500 list as the 76th-fastest-growing company in the United States, the 6th-highest-ranking New York company and 8th in New York City. He served various high-profile companies and blue-chip organizations for premium and air travel including Rolex, Walmart, Berkshire Hathaway, The United Nations, Bayer, Colgate, Universal Studios, Triple Five Group, Columbia University, Escada, and the Maroon 5 band.

In 2015, Ostreicher launched Regal Card, an airport lounge and travel-benefits membership program as a sister concern of Regal Wings. In the late 2016, Regal Wings partnered with China-based lounge developer DragonPass to offer global airport lounge access to its Regal Card members. Regal Card also includes travel benefits such as instant elite status with brands such as Hilton, Hyatt, SIXT, Hertz and discounts at 5-star hotel chains worldwide.

In 2017, he patented One Bag Tag, the world's first electronic luggage tag to replace airline-issued wasteful paper tags. One Bag Tag is now partnered with Amsterdam-based BAGTAG who run One Bag Tag's airline integration to international airliners, including Lufthansa, Swiss, Austrian, Air France, China Southern and KLM.

Ostreicher also founded Miles 4 Flights, which helps individuals convert their airline mileage into flights. In the same year, he started Harei At, the first dating site for orthodox Jewish marriage-minded singles. This venture failed and was subsequently sold to JWed.com.

In 2019, Ostreicher founded both SHARGE and VVandr. SHARGE is the world's smallest 3-port 65W laptop and USB-C/A wall charger, while VVandr makes thermometers, and a handmade hand-painted Donald Trump bobblehead.

In 2020, during C-19 when VVandr sold a large number of oral thermometers, Ostreicher was inspired to create ThermBot, the world's smallest contactless and battery-less smart thermometer.

== Philanthropy ==
In 2013, Ostreicher donated $500,000 to Bonei Olam, a communal organization that aids married couples dealing with infertility. He was on the senior advisory board of various startup and entrepreneur-focused organizations, including YJP and Voyager HQ.

Ostreicher has been involved in helping his uncle Jacob Ostreicher in his release from a Bolivian prison where he was corruptly held for 18 months without having committed any crime. He was later released by the help of actor Sean Penn who went to visit him in Bolivia.

== Personal life and demise ==
Ostreicher relocated from the UK to the US when he was in his early 20s. Initially he was in southern Florida. He later resided in New York City.

Ostreicher was killed in a motorcycle collision in Thailand on January 11, 2023, at age 39.

== Awards and honors ==
- Inc. 500 #1 Fastest-Growing Travel Company, 2013
- Inc. Hire Power Awards, 2013
- Nedivas Halev Award, 2016
- Inc. 500 #76 of 500 Fastest-Growing US Companies, 2014
- Inc. 500 #6 Fastest Growing NYC Company
- Crain's New York Fast 50, 2015
- Crain's New York Fast 50, 2016
- Smart CEO, 2017
