= Machon Gold =

Machon Gold was an Orthodox Jewish girl's seminary (originally co-ed) founded in 1958 by the Torah Education Department of the World Zionist Organization and named after Rabbi Wolf Gold, one of the signatories of the Israeli declaration of independence. It was arguably the first such seminary intended for students from the US. The school closed in 2008 due to financial considerations.

It was one of the few Religious Zionist seminaries for English speakers in Israel. It was located in Jerusalem, in the Geula neighborhood. In the two decades before closing, most students were post high school, continuing their Torah Study for a year or two in Israel; prior to that, most students came as part of a study abroad program in college.

The school's faculty included Nechama Leibowitz and Rabbi Yeshayahu Hadari (who later founded boys' seminary Yeshivat HaKotel).

Classes emphasized Halacha, Tanakh and Hashkafah, and included courses in Gemara, Mishna, Musar, Jewish philosophy and Jewish history.

Students graduating from Machon Gold received a teacher's license from the Israel Ministry of Education.

== See also ==
- Herzog College
- Midrasha § Israel programs
- Lifshitz College of Education
- Jerusalem Michlala
- Migdal Oz (seminary)
- Tal Institute
- Talpiot College of Education
