= Lifshitz College of Education =

Religious teacher training college in Jerusalem, Israel

Coordinates: 31°48′4.9″N 35°14′26.8″E

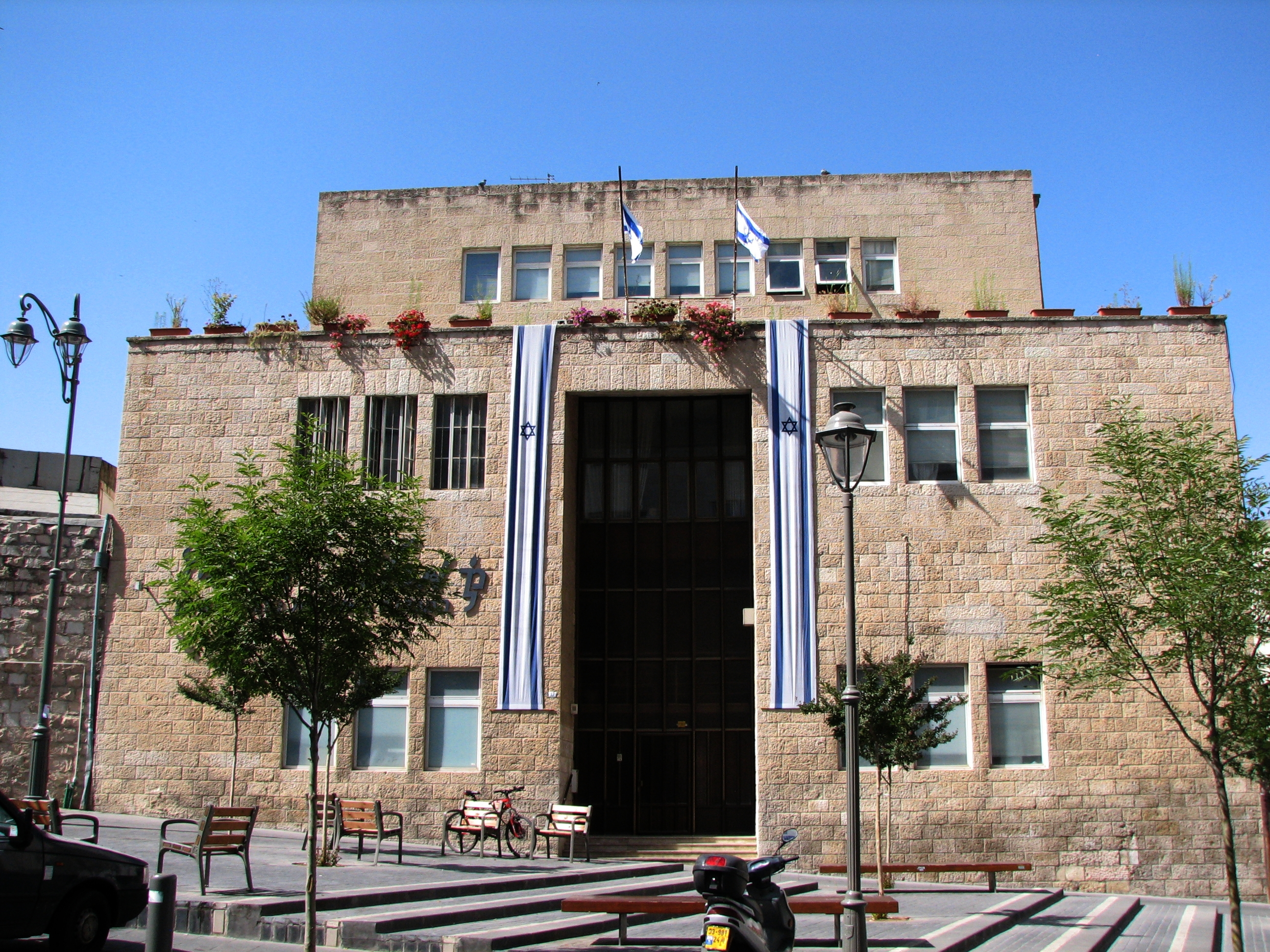
Lifshitz College, Jerusalem

Lifshitz College of Education ("Michlelet Lifshitz" - מכללת ליפשיץ - המכללה האקדמית הדתית לחינוך) is a religious teacher training college in Jerusalem, Israel. The school credo is "integrating modernity and Jewish life."

== History ==
Mizrachi Teachers' Training College was the first teachers' training college for national religious teachers in the Land of Israel. It was established in Jerusalem in 1921 by Rabbi Moshe Ostrovsky-Hame'iri and Eliezer Meir Lipschütz (mistakenly spelled Lifshitz), and Dr. Noah Hakham, father of Amos Hakham. After Lipschütz's death in 1946, the college was renamed in his honor.

The college is approved by the Council for Higher Education in Israel and offers a range of programs, including fully accredited Bachelor of Education and Master of Education degrees. It conducts research on the methodology and philosophy of Jewish education; it also operates the Lifshitz Center for Jewish Education in the Diaspora.

== See also ==
- Religious Zionism
- Education in Israel
- Herzog College
- Machon Gold
- Migdal Oz (seminary)
- Michlala
- Midrasha
- Tal Institute
- Talpiot College of Education
- Ein HaNatziv Women's Seminary
