= Midrasha =

Institute of post-secondary Jewish studies for women

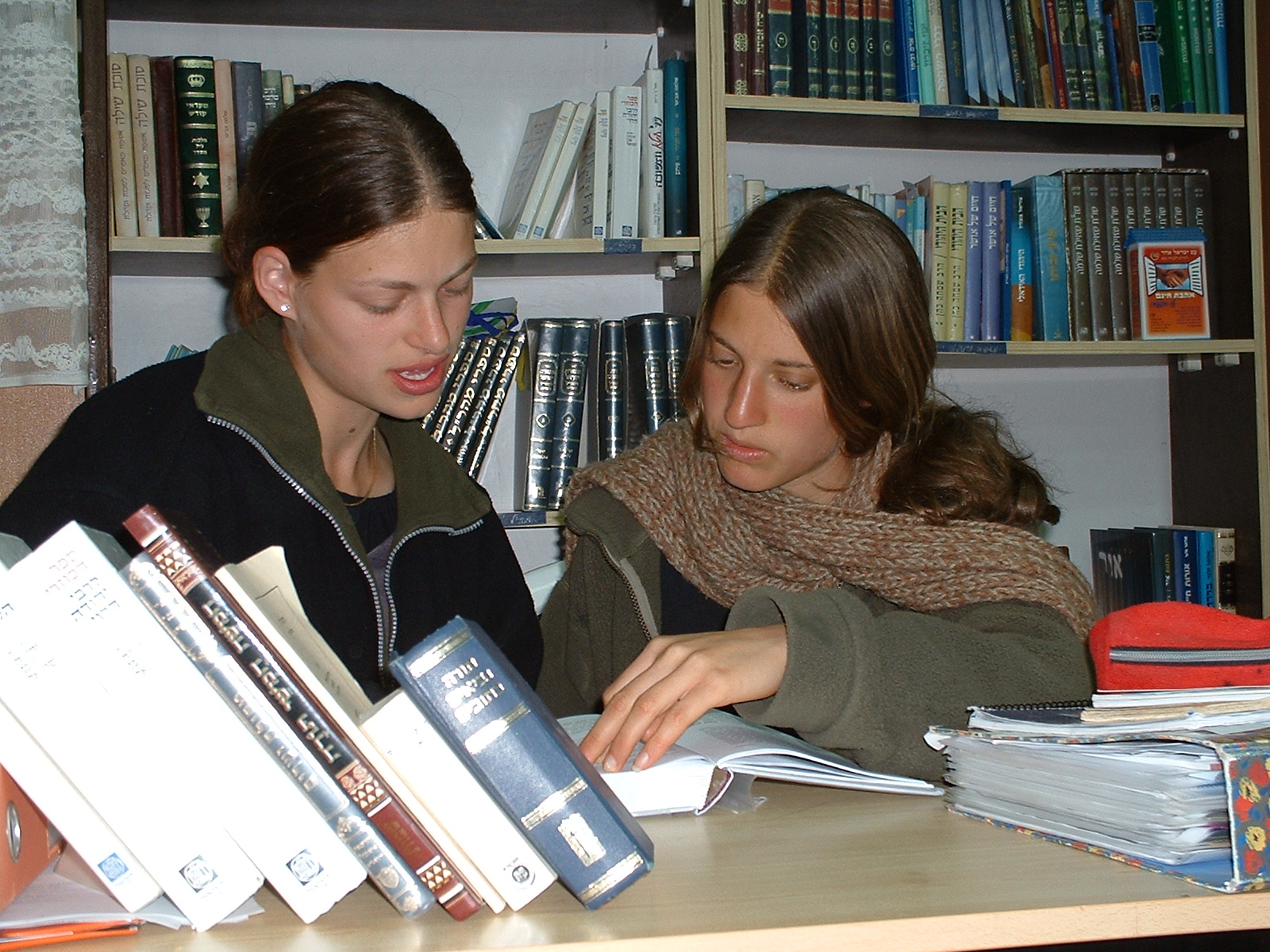
Chavruta-study Midreshet Shilat

A midrasha (Hebrew: מדרשה; pl.: midrashot/midrashas), typically, is an institute of Torah study for women of post-high-school age, somewhat equivalent to a men's yeshiva; most are located in Israel.

The midrasha is also somewhat parallel to a "women's seminary" (Hebrew סמינר "seminar", sometimes "seminaria"), which functions in a similar form. While the terms may sometimes become interchangeable, "midrashot" are commonly linked to Religious Zionism (or modern orthodoxy), while the women's "seminaries" are usually associated with Haredi Judaism.

The term "midrasha" is sometimes used to refer to pluralistic Torah-institutions. Particularly in Israel, also referenced are a selection of secular (non-Torah) institutions, formal and informal; these various organizations are covered in outline below. To distinguish, then, the religious focused institutions may (In Israel) be termed "Midrasha Toranit" (Torah Midrasha) or "Midrasha l'Banot" (Girls' Midrasha).

== Etymology ==
The word "midrasha" is based on the term beit midrash, "house of study"; the root דרש means "to seek [knowledge]", and is then generalized to mean "expound". It is cognate with the Arabic "madrasah," which also refers to a place of learning.

A midrasha that offers degree studies is sometimes titled machon (מכון, institute) or michlalah (מכללה, college - see former Michlalah-Jerusalem College for Women, currently simply Michlalah-Jerusalem College.

== History ==
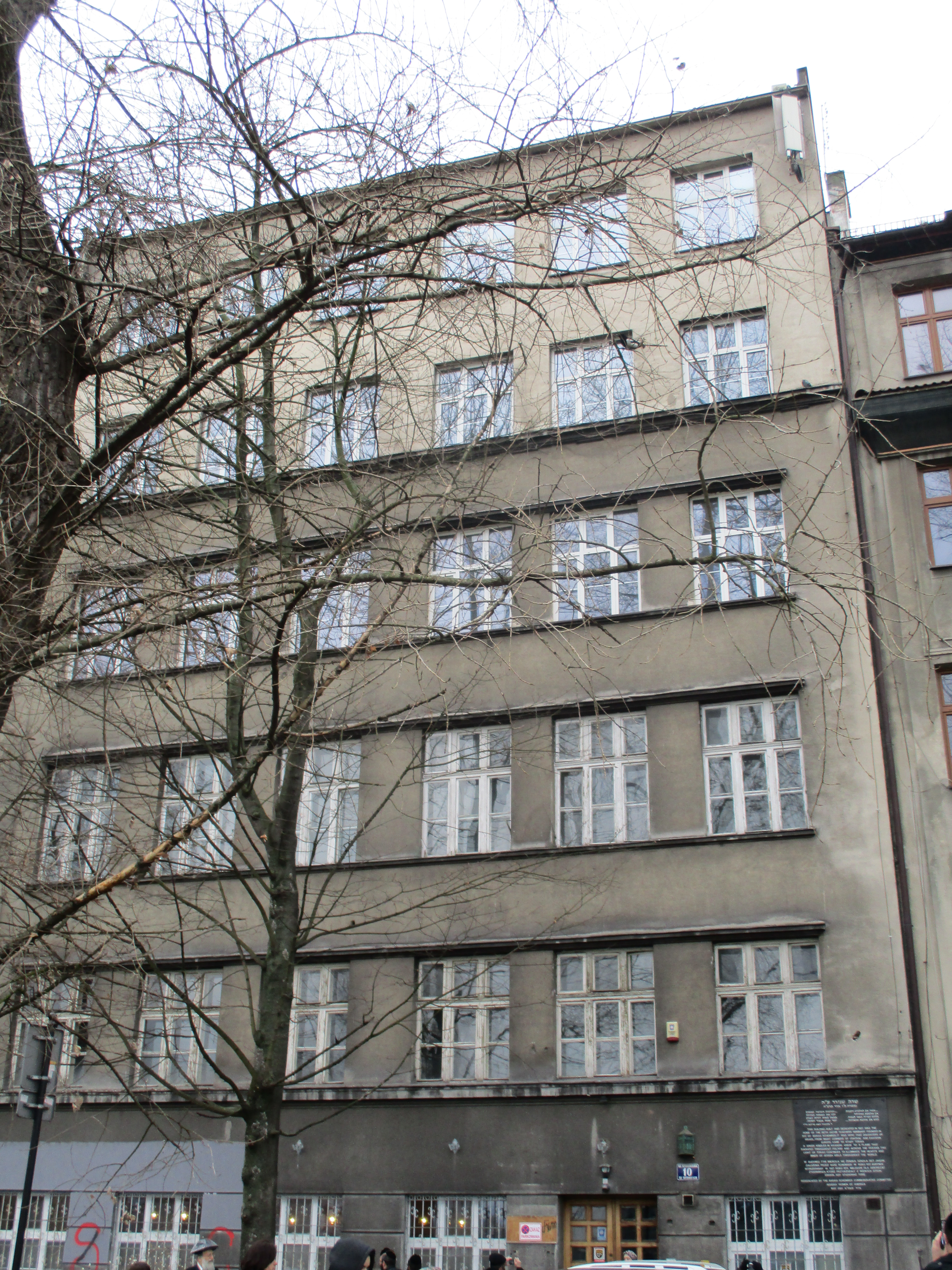
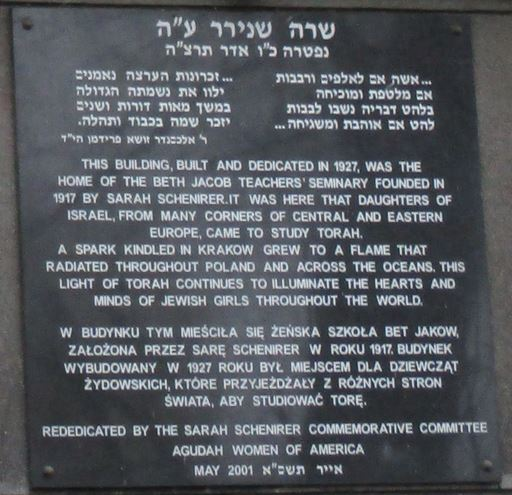
Founding Beit Yaakov Teachers' Seminary, Kraków, Poland, and plaque detail

Haredi aligned seminaries, such as Beth Jacob Jerusalem and Gateshead Jewish Academy for Girls, are modeled on the Bais Yaakov movement's teacher-training seminary established by Sarah Schenirer in 1923; today, "Beis Yaakov" will typically refer to high school, while "seminary" is a term used for a post-high school institution. Outside of Europe, the Beis Yaakov Seminary, Tel Aviv was founded in 1933, and Jerusalem's Beis Yaakov Institute for Teachers in 1939; the first Seminary in the USA was established by Vichna Kaplan in Williamsburg, Brooklyn in 1941; Gateshead Seminary in the UK, was founded in 1944. The Rika Breuer Teachers Seminary – of the Breuers / Khal Adath Jeshurun community – was established in the 1960s and operated for over 40 years. Additionally, see: Bais Medrash L'Morim (or ILBA), established in 1864 by Seligman Baer Bamberger; and "Yavneh", a women's seminary established in 1930 in association with the Telshe Yeshiva.

The Religious Zionist and Modern Orthodox midrashot began to be established in the late 1970s, parallel to the Hesder yeshivot; these include the Religious Kibbutz Movement's Midreshet Ein HaNetziv, Midreshet Lindenbaum, and Migdal Oz, sister school of Yeshivat Har Etzion. Precedent, are the Mizrachi Teachers Training College, today's Lifshitz College of Education, which was established in Jerusalem in 1921; the Talpiot Bet Medrash for Teachers in 1937; and Machon Gold in 1958. Lindenbaum, in 1976, was the first established independent of a teacher's college. The largest Midrasha is at Bar-Ilan University, with 800 students in its various programs. "Nishmat", est. 1990, was - along with Lindenbaum - pioneering in its emphasis on Talmud; see below.

== Curriculum ==
Midrashot and seminaries vary in curriculum and hashkafah, or outlook. All cover the Tanakh (Bible), Jewish philosophy (often called "Machshavah"), practical Halacha (Jewish law; "Halacha LeMaaseh"), and Hasidic philosophy / Musar (character development); topics in applied Jewish ethics, such as the "laws of speech", are usually taught separately. The Jewish holidays are similarly often studied as a separate topic, "Ma'agal Hashana", in terms of both philosophy and Halacha; and Tefillah, "prayer", is covered likewise. Depending on the institution's stance, the weight and role assigned to Talmud particularly, and in fact to textual-skills generally, will differ re men's yeshivot, and between schools.

=== Midrashot ===
In Israel, young women attend Midrasha for one year, either before or following their Sherut Leumi (national civic service); a second year is sometimes offered. Programs often emphasize Machshavah, deepening their students' religious identity at this life-stage; (Note: See the corresponding Hebrew article: He: מדרשה תורני לנשים) this may include specific study of the writings of Rav Kook, and/or Torat Eretz Yisrael in general. At Midrashot, the treatment of the Tanakh and Machshavah, is typically text-focused, built around chavruta-based study as at yeshivot. This entails paired-study where assigned sources ("marei mekomot") are prepared for a shiur, a lecture delivered as a discursive-review. At some institutions, the Talmud is directly studied, as at men's yeshivot, if less intensively; (Note: See Women in Judaism § Joseph Soloveitchik) others treat Talmud similar to seminaries, as below. Regardless, Halachah will generally be studied with practice in view, as opposed to the yeshiva approach, where the derivation is from Talmudic sources through codification. At Matan, Nishmat and Lindenbaum, the treatment is Talmud-based; see also Drisha Institute.

=== Seminaries ===
Seminary programs usually span two years post high-school. Seminaries are typically more conservative in their approach than Midrashot: selections from the Talmud – usually the non-legalistic aggadah – may be studied, but only in the context of other classes, especially philosophy and Musar; (Note: See Bais Yaakov § Curriculum, Women in Judaism § Education of women) the only section of Talmud studied directly is Pirkei Avot, comprising ethical teachings and maxims. These institutions relatedly assign less weight to textual skills, with content delivered primarily via lecture. As appropriate to the program in question, formal teacher training and certification is often provided. Parallel to their academic content, most Seminaries also focus on the role of women in Torah (several Midrashot similarly), covering topics such as Tzniut (modesty), Shalom Bayit ("domestic harmony") and Chinuch (education of one's children), and preparing students for the role of akeres habayis, or "household mainstay". These classes often emphasize "values", as opposed to sources. (Note: See Bais Yaakov § Educational approach.) Hasidic-aligned institutions are positioned in line with the Seminaries; their curricula differ in that they emphasize the works of their respective Rebbe, and their exposure to text is often further limited. Note that some Chabad-affiliated institutions, on the other hand, offer classes in Talmud and text-based Halacha.

=== Israel programs ===
Many diaspora-based women attend midrasha or "sem" in Israel, for a year or two ("shana bet") following high school; several midrashot and seminaries offer specific programs here, for example Shana Ba'aretz at Nishmat, or the "Overseas Program" at Midreshet HaRova. Additional to Torah study, as above, these programs often include an element of yediat ha'aretz ("knowledge of the Land") comprising touring of Israel, Shabbatons in various communities, seminars with journalists and politicians, and typically volunteer work in local schools and hospitals; often a trip to Poland is scheduled to memorealize the Holocaust. Some institutions accommodate the newly observant with similar year-programs, designed to build foundational knowledge and skills; well known are Neve Yerushalayim, Mayanot, and Machon Roni; Machon Chana is US based.

== Certifications ==
Most Haredi and Hasidic seminaries offer certificates, and sometimes degrees, in Education. In Israel, the two year certificates are jointly through the Szold Institute, and are recognized by the Israel Ministry of Education as equivalent to the national matriculation. Chabad's Beth Rivkah offers a B.A. and M.A. jointly with the Shaanan Religious College of Education; "Beth Chanah", its affiliated program in Tzfat and Jerusalem, offers a 2-year certificate. JCT's Lustig Campus in Ramat Gan hosts degree programs for Haredi and Hasidic women; see also The Haredi Campus – The Academic College Ono.

In the Religious Zionist community, women often continue their studies at one of the midrasha-affiliated teacher training colleges, which offer an intensive Torah-program in conjunction with the B.Ed. degree; (master's level) specializations are often offered in Tanakh or Machshavah. The year in Midrasha is sometimes integrated with the college program. Bar-Ilan University operates a midrasha, and students in all disciplines may then continue Torah study in parallel with their academic studies (with a requirement of at least ten courses in Judaism). Machon Tal, associated with JCT, the Jerusalem College of Technology, similarly offers degrees in engineering and management. Female faculty at Midrashot often hold Doctorates, usually from Bar-Ilan.

Most Seminaries and midrashot for English-speaking students are accredited by American colleges; see Yeshiva § College credit. Some offer second-year programs with religious-studies classes in the morning and general-studies classes in the afternoons, allowing students to pursue a religious education with a college degree simultaneously. In the US, the Modern Orthodox Stern College for Women (Yeshiva University) combines Torah and University studies, as at Bar-Ilan; the Haredi Lander College for Women similarly. Stern graduates often pursue Torah topics at the Masters level, through the Bernard Revel Graduate School of Jewish Studies.

In recent years (Note: For further discussion, see Women rabbis and Torah scholars § Orthodox Judaism.) some midrashot offer specialized programs in Halacha, comprising Talmud-intensive source study, with certifying examinations on the relevant sections of codified law in the Shulchan Aruch. Nishmat trains women as Yoatzot Halacha, advisors in the laws of Tahara, or Family purity; Lindenbaum, through a joint program, prepares women as to'anot, advocates in religious courts for matters relating to divorce. Three programs mirror the Rabbinate's ordination requirement for men: Ein Hanetziv trains students as "Teachers of Halacha", Lindenbaum in "Halachik leadership" and Matan as "Halachik Respondents". Yeshiva University's GPATS, offers women graduate-students a Master's program in advanced Talmud and Halacha, such that they are "credentialed" for communal leadership roles.

== Other institutions ==
=== Religious ===
As above, the term "midrasha" is sometimes used for pluralistic, as opposed to orthodox, institutions for Torah study. These are usually structured around continuing / adult education, and accept both men and women. Examples in Israel are the Ein Prat Midrasha and the Midrasha at the Oranim Academic College (see below re other programs there); elsewhere, the Melton School's Midrasha in Cape Town. Other non-orthodox programs for women (usually egalitarian) include those at "Pardes", which offers various learning formats worldwide, and Mechon Hadar a Conservative-aligned beth midrash in New York. Oranim, in partnership with the Shalom Hartman Institute, in fact offers a pluralistic ordination to both men and women. In the United States, the term Midrasha is relatedly used for programs where high school students can continue their Jewish education post bar / bat mitzvah.

Within the Orthodox community, continuing-education programs for women, similar to these, are also commonly offered. Many (diaspora) synagogues host a "campus midrasha" or suchlike, offering scheduled daily classes on various topics; many also host a "Community Kollel", which has a corresponding function, and offers adult education to both men and women (usually separately). In Israel, popular offerings are those of Matan and Emunah, while Midreshet Afikim is a program for high-school students; Mizrachi's "Lapidot" program, among others, comprises weekly training for teachers in Mishna, Gemara and Halacha, and Machshava. The London School of Jewish Studies' Women's Midrasha series similarly provides regular text-based classes; other UK based programs include "Ma'ayan", emphasizing Tahara, and "Bradfield", preparing community educators and leaders. In South Africa, "Isha Bekia" is a textual-skill centered program.

=== Secular ===
Various other institutions, as outlined, are also titled "Midrasha", here referring to their focus on seeking knowledge. ''Eshkolot'', an umbrella organization for regional educational tour centers focused on Jewish-Israeli identity awareness, operates "midrashot" aimed at knowledge of the Land of Israel. Midreshet Ben-Gurion – also known as Midreshet Sde Boker – is an educational center and boarding school in the south, offering nature-focused seminars and field trips. Beit Berl College's school of art is called "HaMidrasha". The Israel Institute for Advanced Studies' Advanced School in Mathematics, is known as the Midrasha Mathematicae, and provides top-level lectures on recent developments and innovations in various mathematical topics.

Re Oranim Academic College of Education: Established in 1951 as Seminar Oranim, it was part of the Kibbutz Movement and trained educators for every level, with a focus on kibbutz schools, and including for work with new immigrants; since the mid-1990's it has been accredited as an academic college of education by the Israeli "Council for Higher Education", expanding and partly refocusing its activities. Oranim operates several programs called Midrasha. The HaMidrasha educational center for the renewal of Jewish life in Israel was established in 1989 for non-orthodox Jewish Israelis and promotes an Israeli-Zionist approach to Jewish identity. Midreshet Natur is a collaborative beit midrash with religious and secular participants, and Madrassa/Midrasha pursues Arab–Jewish coexistence in the Galilee through education.

== Gallery ==
Midrashot
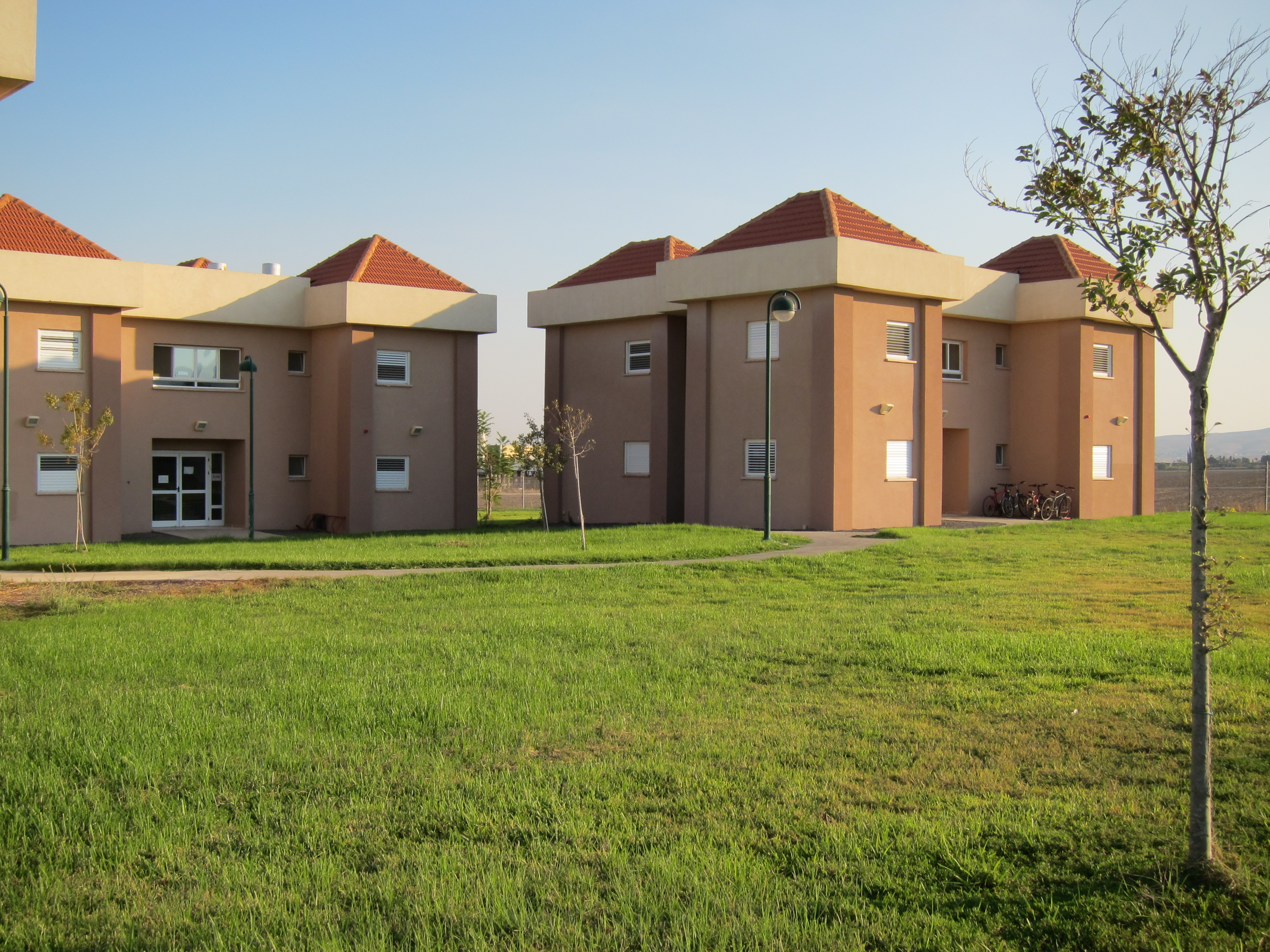
Dormitory accommodation – Midreshet Ein HaNatziv

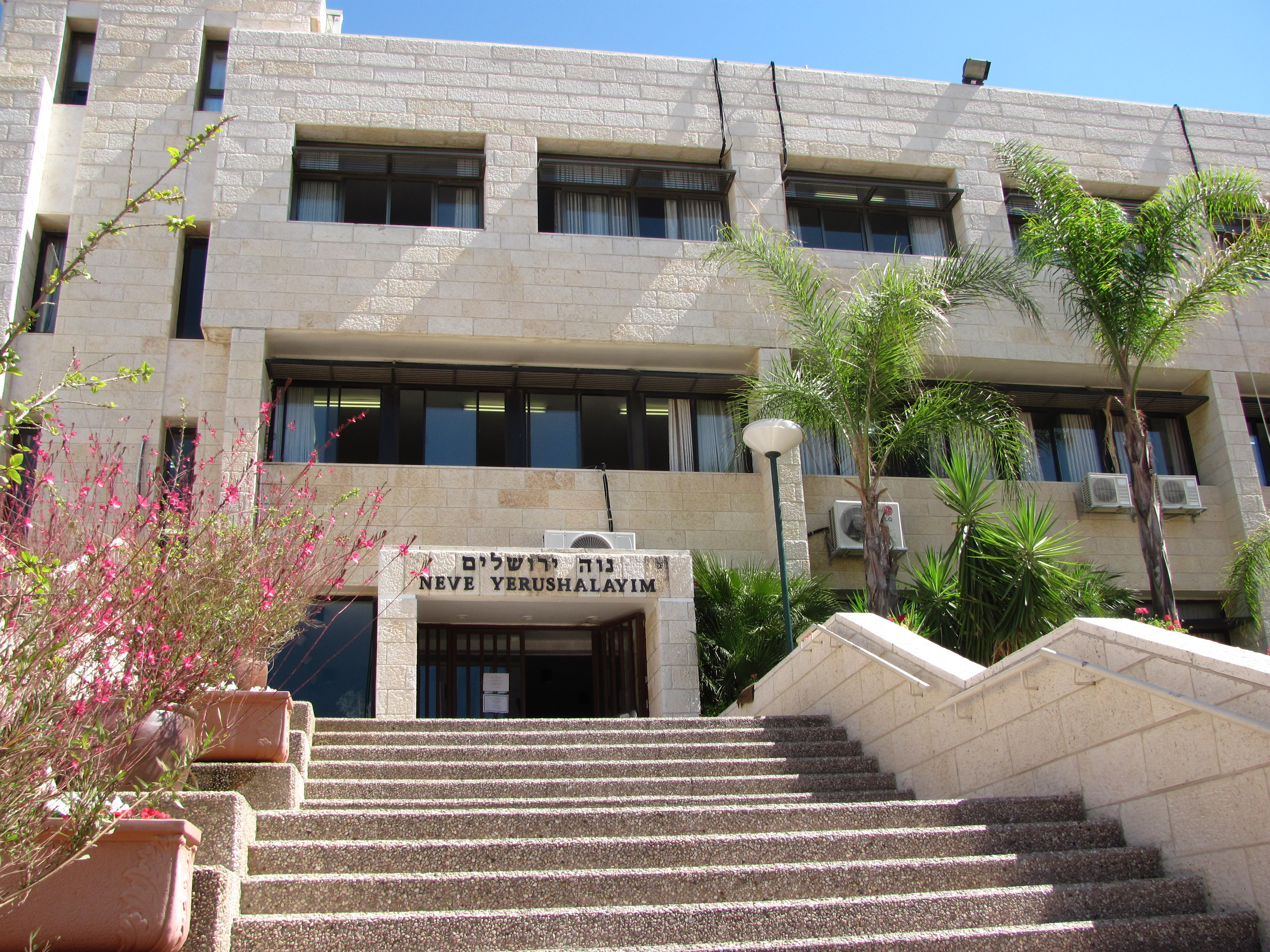
Neve Yerushalayim

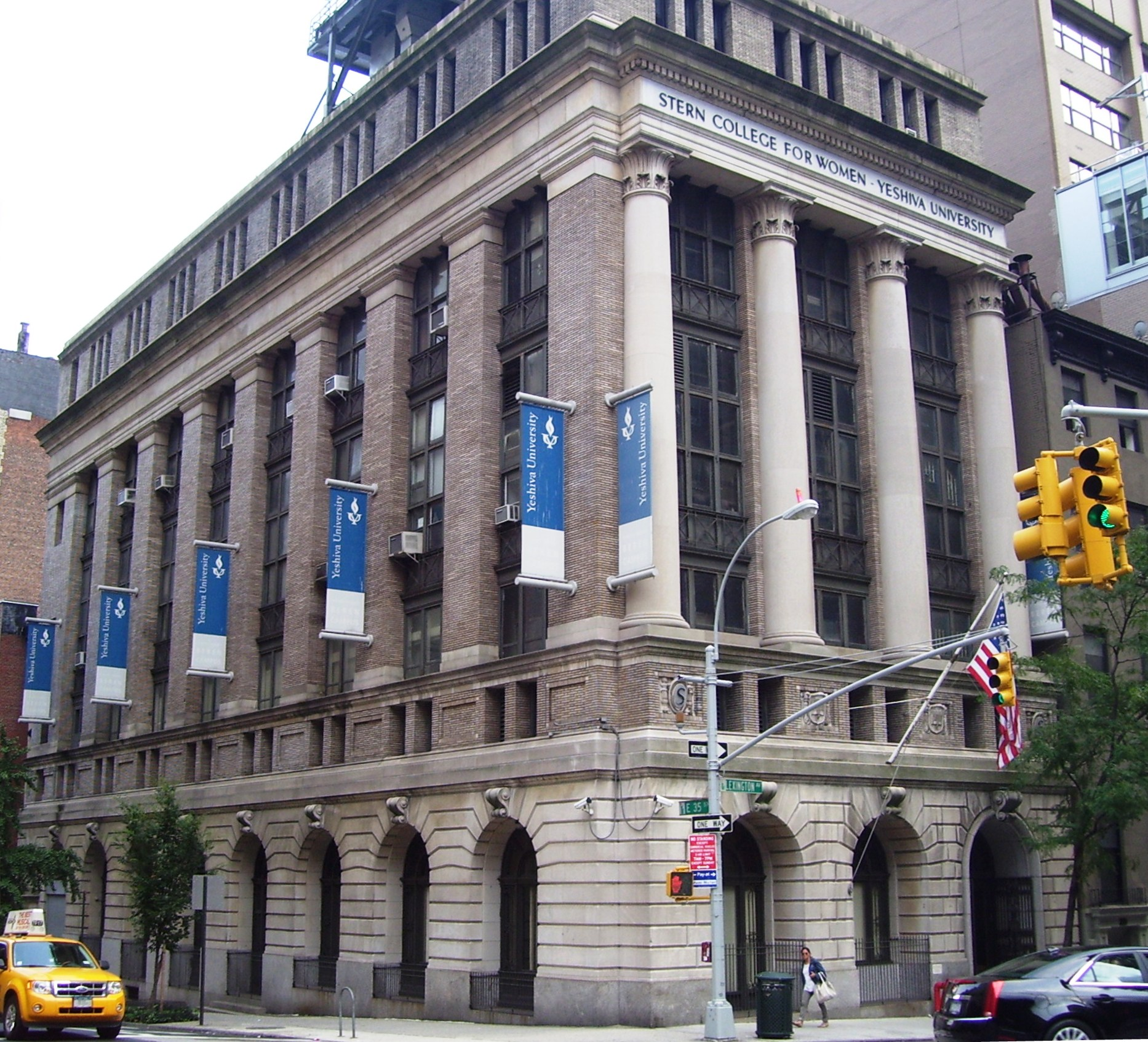
Yeshiva University Stern College for Women

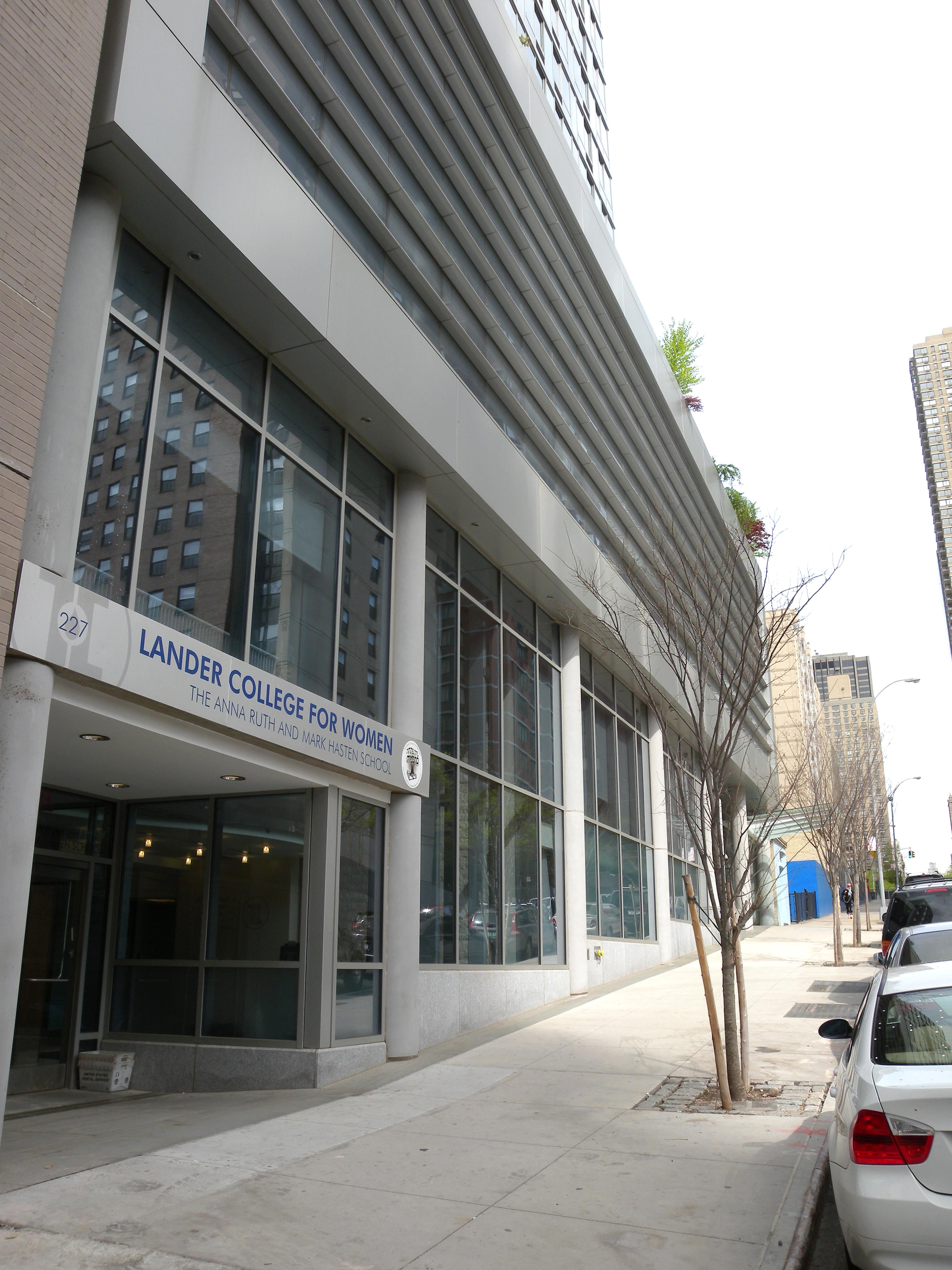
Lander College for Women

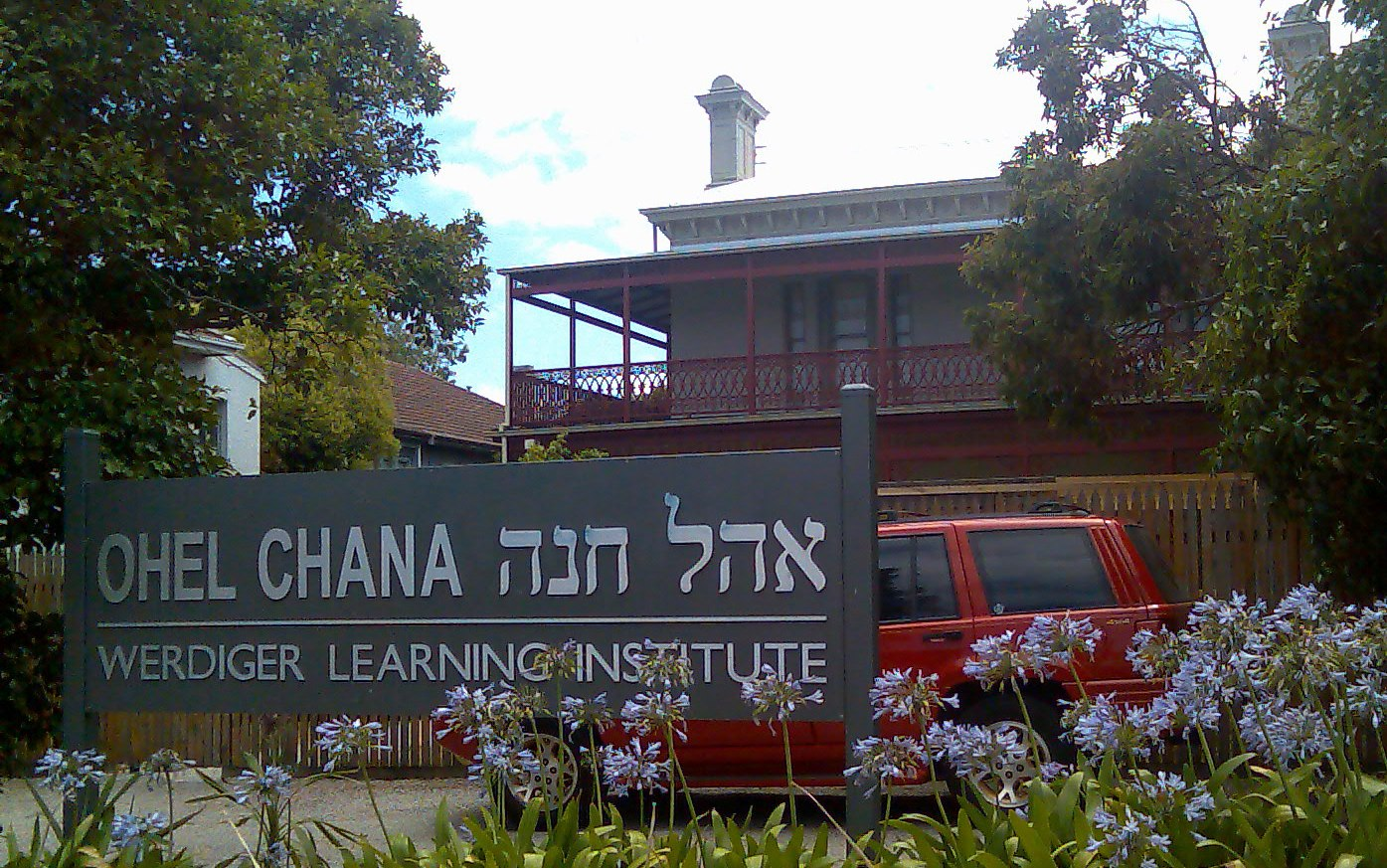
Chabad's Ohel Chana, Melbourne

Yavneh Seminary, Telz, Lithuania

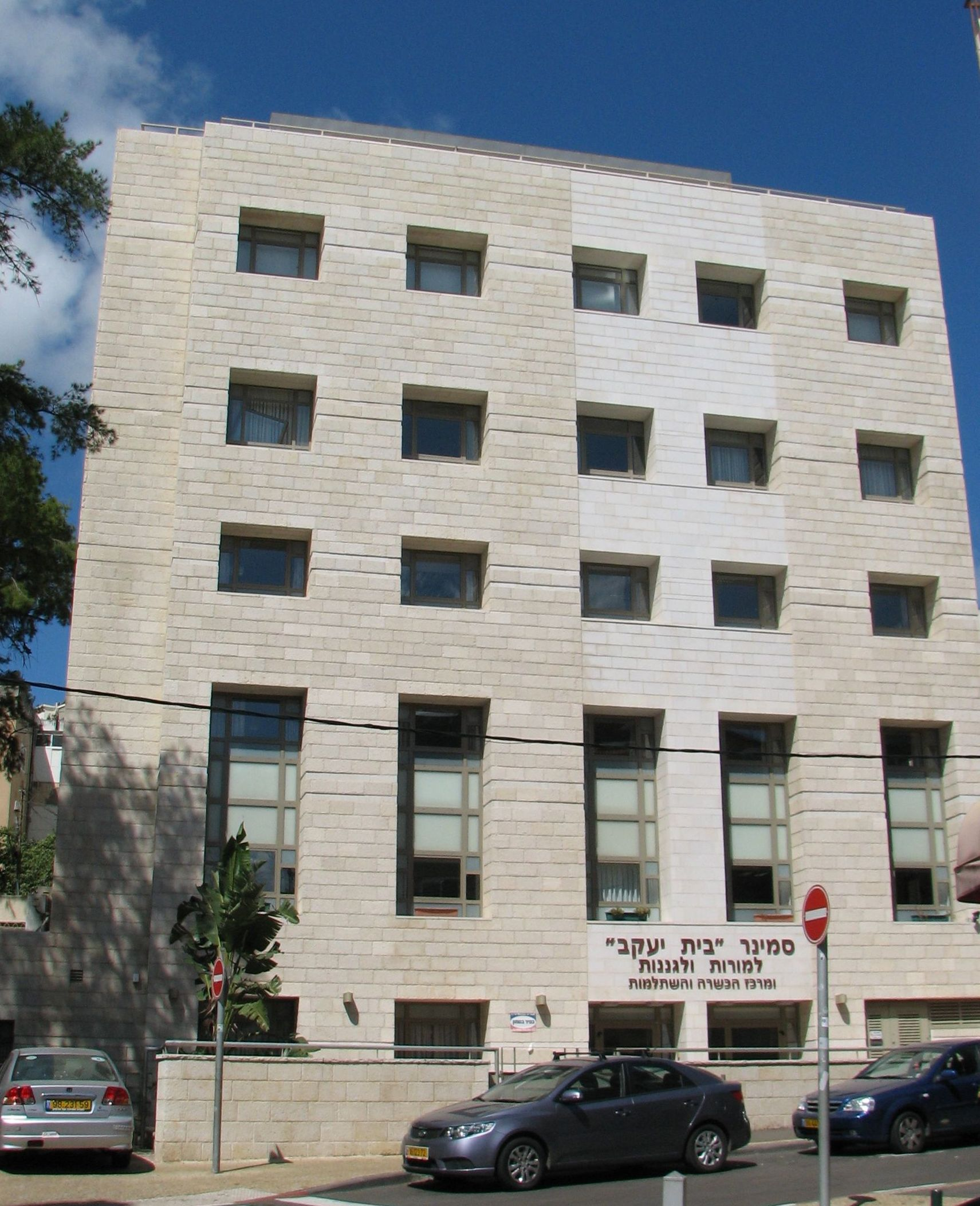
Seminar Beit Yaakov, Haifa

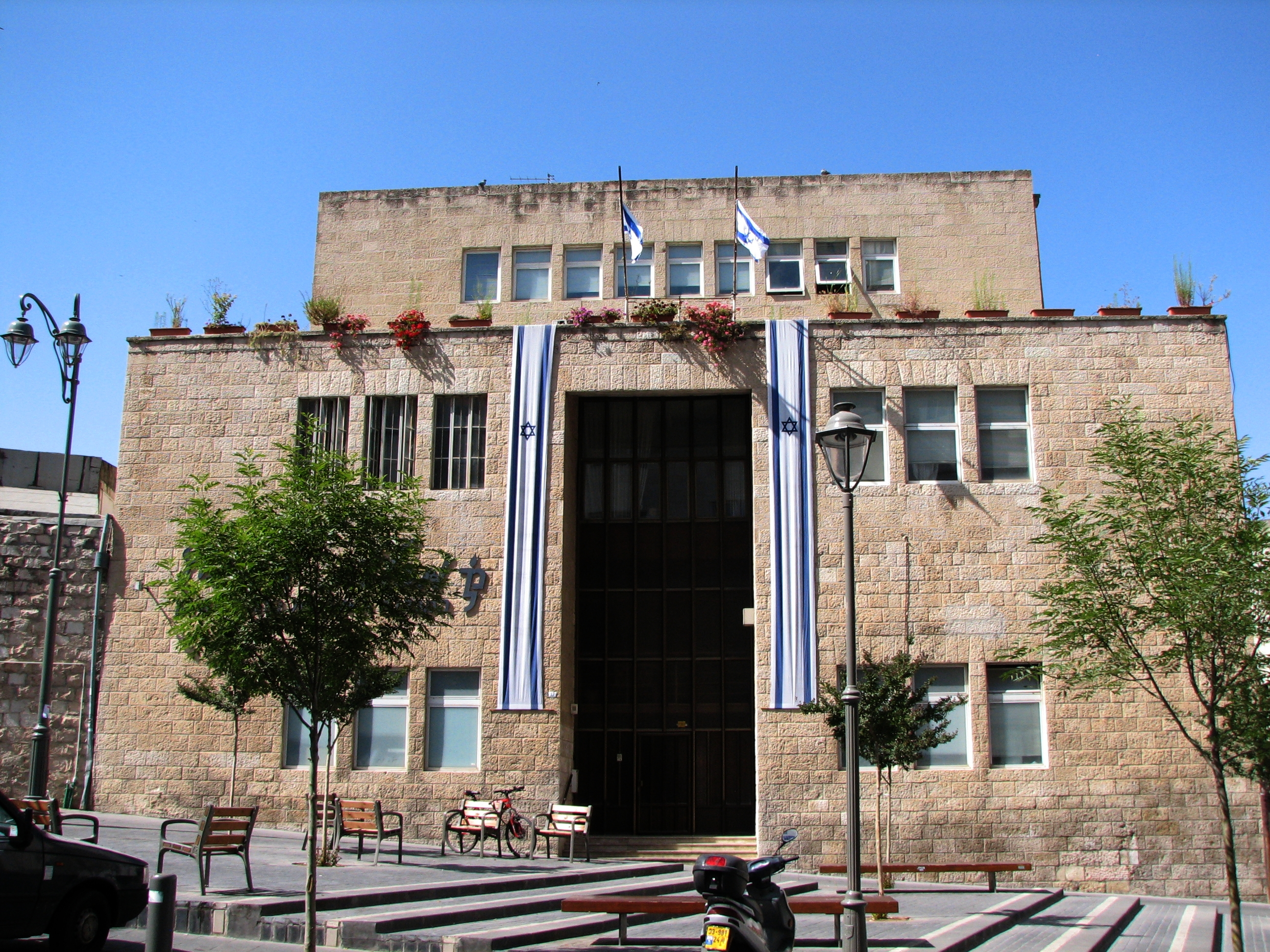
Lifshitz College of Education, Jerusalem (orig. Mizrachi Teachers Seminary)

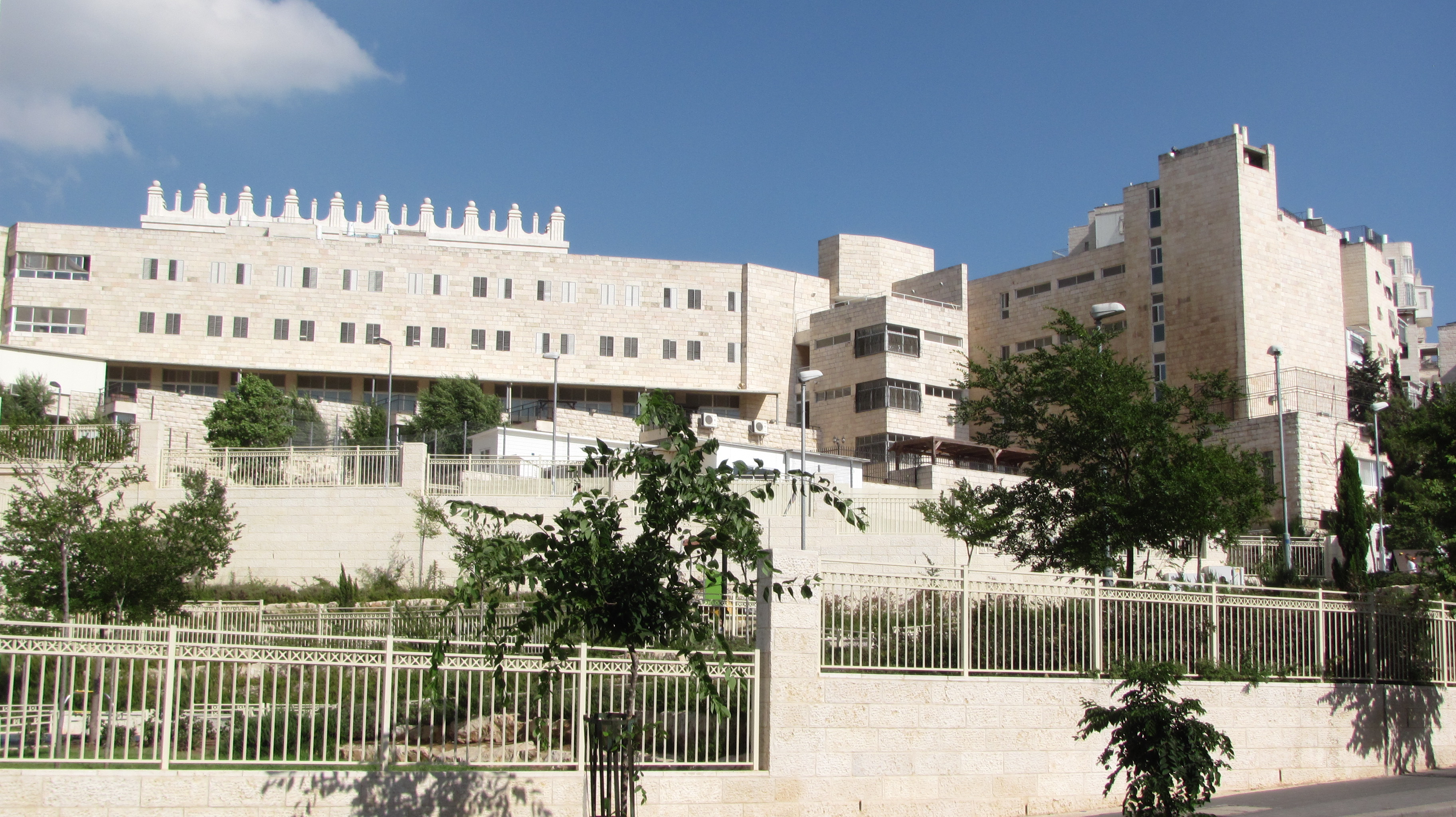
Beth Jacob Jerusalem

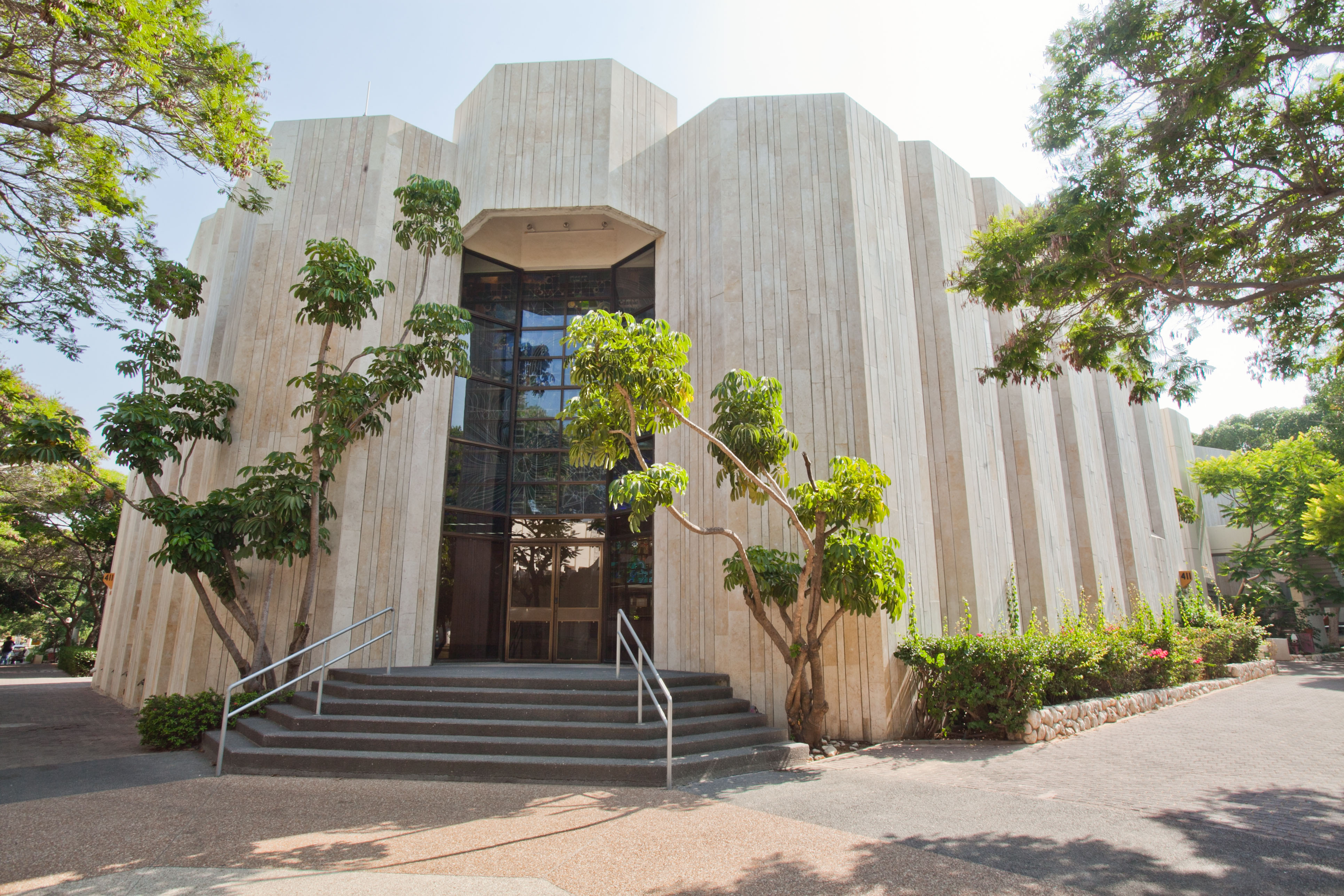
Machon HaGavoah LeTorah housing the Bar-Ilan University Midrasha

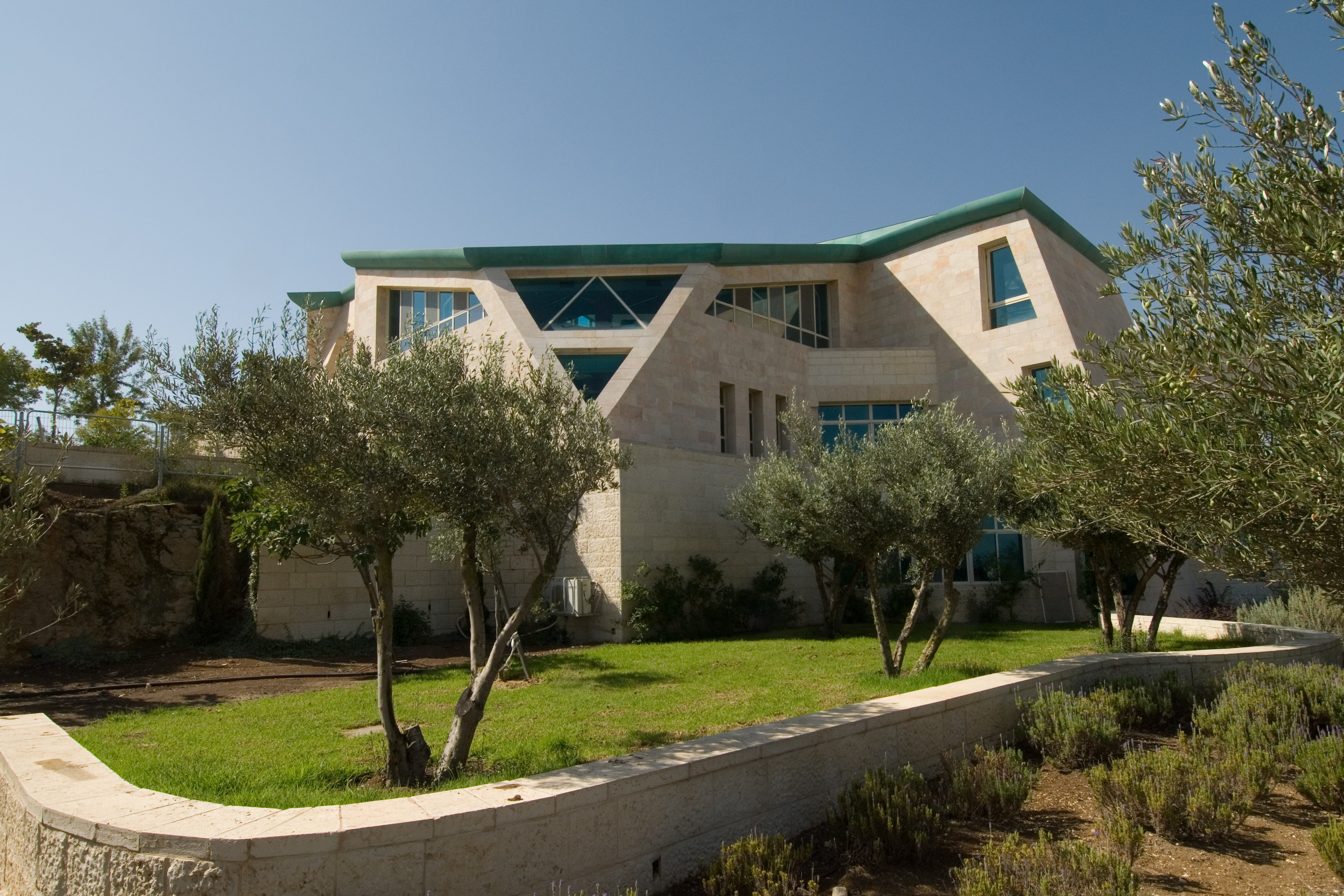
Beit Midrash of Migdal Oz

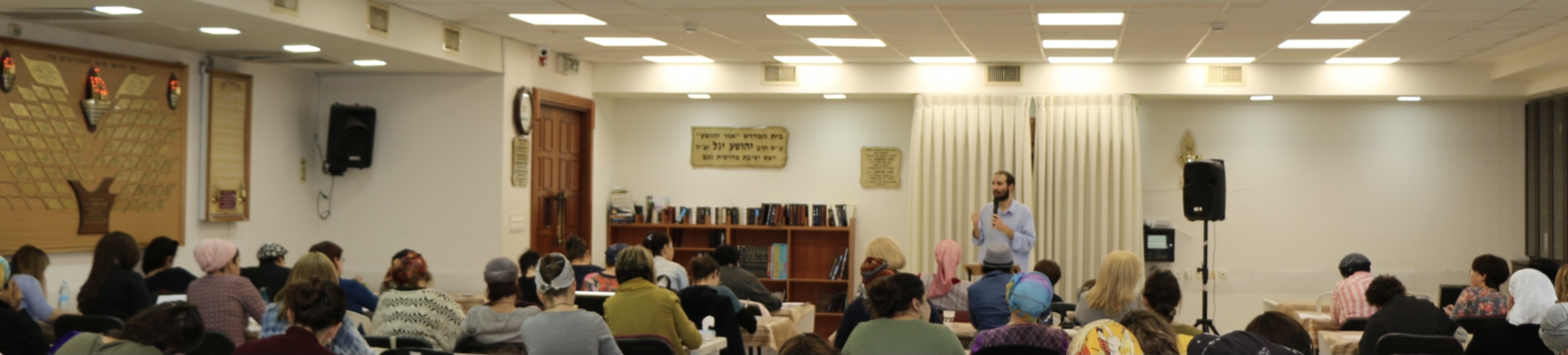
Yom iyun, Midreshet Oryah (click to enlarge)

== See also ==
Religious views, education

- Gender separation in Judaism
- Hashkafa § Gender roles; hashkafa = lit. worldview, in practice: Jewish religious current or movement
- Orthodox Judaism § Diversity
- Women in Judaism and esp. § Views on the education of women
  - Jewish religious education: Girls and women

Educational institutions

- Beis Yaakov, Haredi Jewish elementary and secondary schools for girls
- Beth Rivkah, private Chabad-affiliated girls' school system
- Female seminary, private, primarily 19th- and 20th-century US educational institution (Christian or Jewish)
- Haredi Judaism § Education
- List of Midrashot & List of yeshivas, midrashas and Hebrew schools in Israel § Midrashas
- Religious Zionism § Educational institutions
- Ulpana, girls-only Jewish high school in Israel with religious focus
- WebYeshiva – advanced course-based Torah study for men and women, including the 3 year "Halacha Mastery Program"

Women's ordination

- Women rabbis and Torah scholars § Orthodox Judaism
- Yeshivot ordaining women:
  - Beit Midrash Har'el (Orthodox)
  - Maharat (Open Orthodox)

Jewish identity & Zionism

- Midrasha Zionit, international Jewish community of Russian-speaking Jews with Religious Zionist orientation and educational activities
- Oranim Academic College: the HaMidrasha Educational Center for the Renewal of Jewish Life in Israel

Secular institutions

- Darca schools (Israel): the Darca Midrasha of the Arts, Sciences, and Social Leadership
- HaMidrasha – Faculty of the Arts or Midrasha LeOmanut, art faculty of Beit Berl College
- Midreshet Ben-Gurion, educational center and boarding school

Arab and Islamic

- Madrasa, inside Arab world: any type of educational institution; outside it: religious Islamic school
