= Midreshet HaRova =

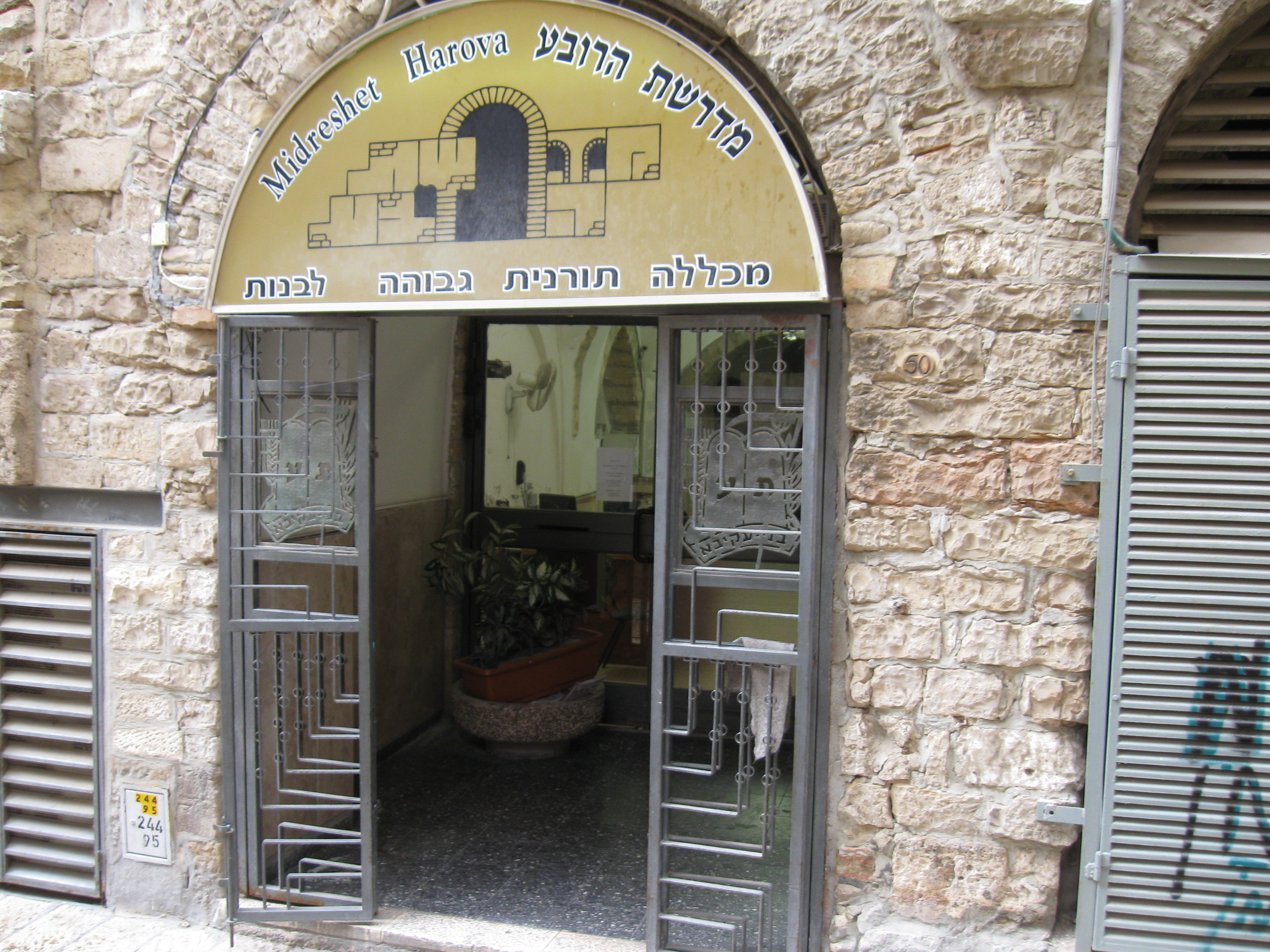

Midreshet HaRova (Hebrew: מדרשת הרובע) is a Religious Zionist Jewish seminary located in the Jewish Quarter of Jerusalem's Old City. The all-female seminary teaches through the lens of emphasizing Aliyah. Amongst the plethora of post-High School seminaries for non-Israelis, the Overseas program is regarded as well rounded, inviting for all levels of learning.

Founded in 1993, it now has more than a dozen programs, for women of all ages from a variety of backgrounds and nationalities. The post-high school yearlong Overseas Program attracts students from across the globe; students in previous years have come from Argentina, South Africa, Australia, New Zealand, United Kingdom, Italy, Germany, Canada, and from different states in the U.S. The teachers also come from all over including the UK, Australia, South Africa, and the U.S. Additionally, the teachers come from a range of backgrounds and upbringings which play a critical role in creating the diverse set of perspectives to which students are exposed throughout their studies. Israelis who have completed their Sherut Leumi (mandatory national service) also partake in a yearlong study program in the Midrasha. Overseas students are able to live alongside the Israelis in several HaRova-owned apartments, while those who choose to live in the dorm building only live with non-Israelis.

Between 50%-60% of the classes are taught in Hebrew, and the rest are given in English. An Ulpan is also offered for students wishing to learn Hebrew. Classes are offered in various subjects such as Torah, Nevi'im (Prophets), Ketuvim (Writings), Machshava (Jewish thought), Gemara, Halacha (Jewish Law), and independent study.

The head of school is Rabbi David Milston, a British national and alumnus of Yeshivat Har Etzion who served as Director of Midreshet HaRova for the past 28 years. Rav Milston received semicha from the Chief Rabbinate of Israel. The current director is Dr. Yocheved Debow who received her doctorate in Education from Bar Ilan University.
