= Jewish thought =

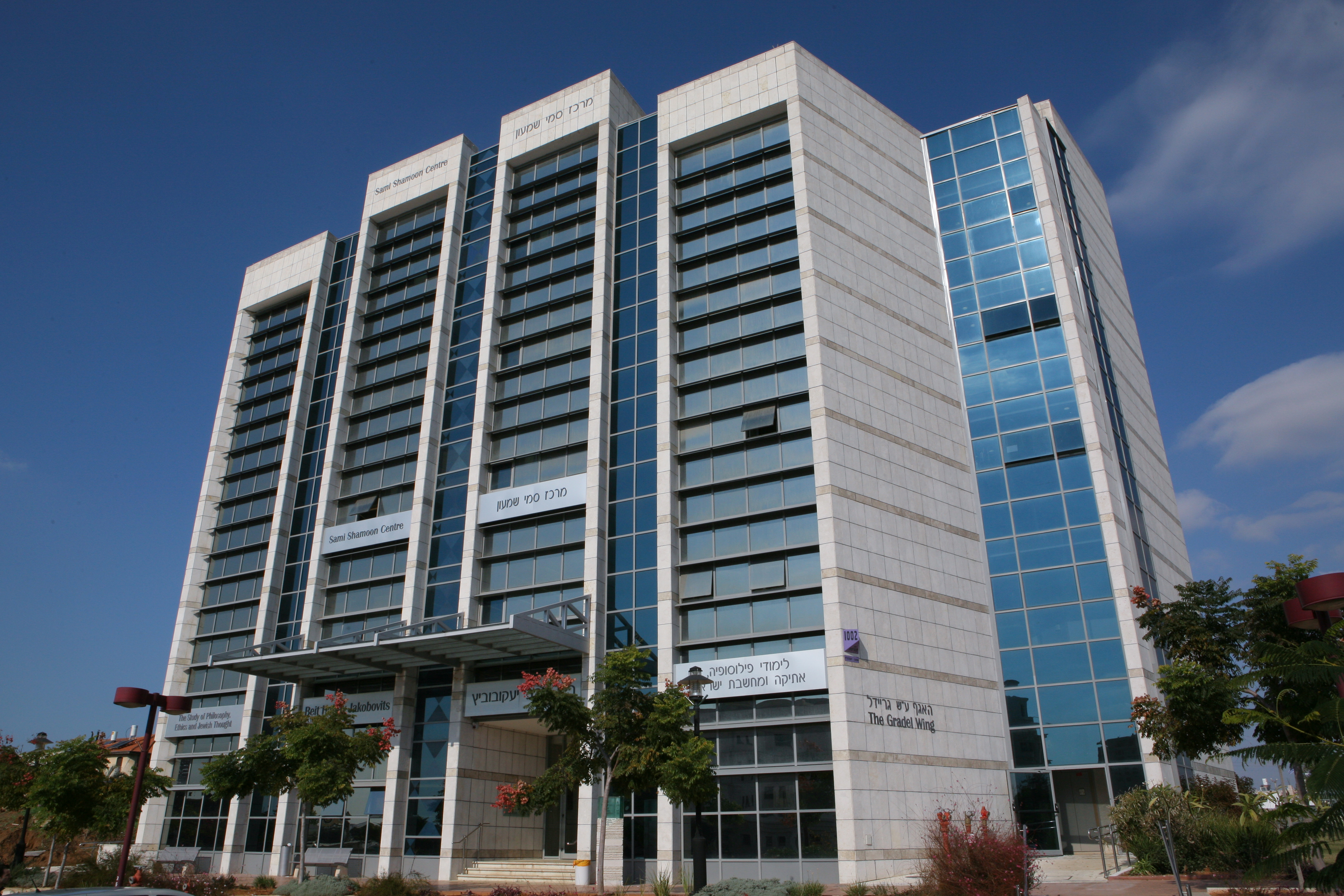
Bar Ilan University - Centre for the study of philosophy, ethics and Jewish thought

Jewish thought (Hebrew: מחשבת ישראל, Machshevet Yisrael), also known as Judaic thought or Hebraic thought, is a field of Jewish studies that deals with the products of Jewish thought and culture throughout the ages, and their historical development. The field also deals with the connections, parallels, and influences, between Jewish ways of thought and world philosophy in general.

The term "Jewish thought" was originally suggested by Rabbi Abraham Isaac Kook, within the framework of the founding of his central Israeli yeshiva, Mercaz HaRav. Jewish thought became a standard field in yeshiva studies in Israel, particularly within Hesder yeshivot, and at women's midrashot; see Yeshiva § Ethics, mysticism and philosophy.

The Israeli Ministry of Education recognized it as a "profession" - a course of study which can result in a formal educational degree. "Jewish thought" became a formal department in the Hebrew University of Jerusalem when the two departments of "Jewish Philosophy and Kabbalah", and "The History of Jewish Thought" were merged, and augmented by the addition of "Ethical Literature" to the department. Today the field of Jewish thought is a recognized field of study throughout Israeli yeshivas and universities.

== See also ==
- Hashkafa
- Jewish philosophy
- Jewish principles of faith
- Torat Eretz Yisrael
