= Tal Institute =

Women's division of the Jerusalem College of Technology

Coordinates: 31.785612°N 35.189681°E

The Tal Institute/ Machon Tal (Hebrew: מכון טל, Makhon Tal), founded in 1999, is the main women's division of the Jerusalem College of Technology. It is located in the Givat Shaul neighborhood of Jerusalem. Over 1,000 students from Israel and around the world study there. The uniqueness of the Machon Tal is that it combines engineering and/or management studies with the study of Torah. It is also the only religious school in Israel to offer an academic degree in Nursing. The academic studies are offered at a university level, with full recognition from the Council for Higher Education in Israel. The students come from a broad range of religious backgrounds in Israel and the Diaspora. Due to the large number of olim, the Tal Institute also has a New Olim Department. The department assists the new immigrants in various ways from tutoring in difficult subjects to extra time on tests.

== Degrees ==
The Tal Institute awards the following degrees:

- Bachelor of Science in: Applied Physics/Electro-Optical Engineering, Applied Physics - Medical Engineering, Software Engineering, Computer Sciences, Computational Chemistry, and Industrial Engineering.
- Bachelor of Managerial Accounting and Information Systems
- Bachelor of Technical Management & Marketing
- Bachelor of Nursing

== Goals ==
- To teach the students to incorporate into their secular lives also Torah study and Derech Eretz.
- To train religious engineers and managers that will integrate into the elite technological industry and management staffs of Israel.
- To allow those who are interested in working in education to receive a teaching degree in addition.

== Midreshet Ma'amakim ==
Midreshet Ma'amakim (Hebrew: מדרשת מעמקים) is the Jewish studies program located on the campus; see Midrasha. All students integrate Jewish studies classes from Midreshet Ma'amakim with their regular academic studies.

== See also ==
- Herzog College
- Lifshitz College of Education
- Machon Gold
- Michlala
- Migdal Oz (seminary)
- Talpiot College of Education
