= Ohel Chana =

Chabad school

- Hebrew: אוהל חנה
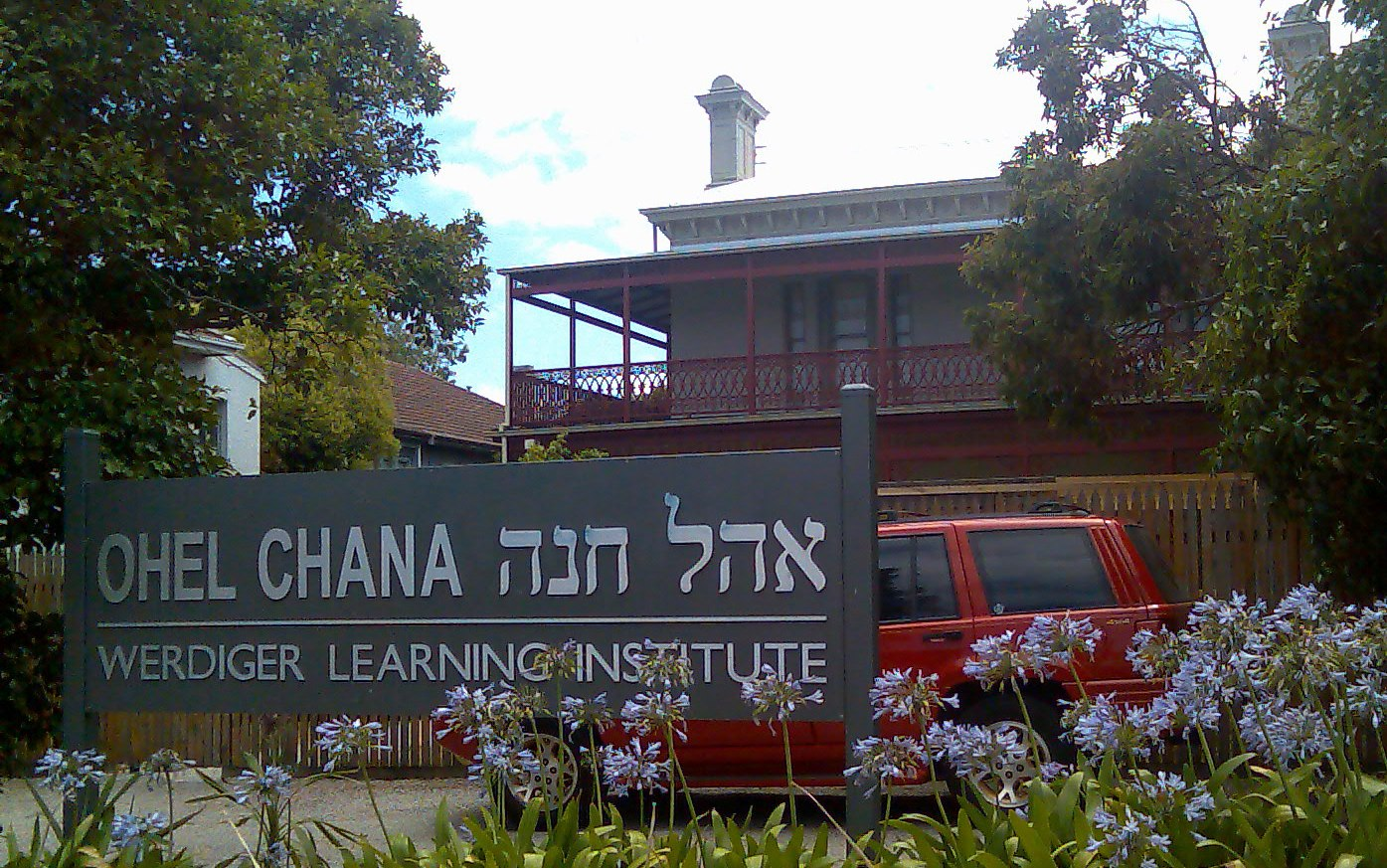
- Ohel Chana
- Type: Seminary
- Established: 1971; 55 years ago
- Religious affiliation: Orthodox Jewish; Chabad Lubavitch hasidic
- Director: Mrs Rivkah Groner
- Location: 6 Balaclava Road, St Kilda East, Melbourne, Victoria, Australia; 37°52′10″S 145°00′00″E
- Gender: Women only
- Website: www.ohelchana.edu.au

Ohel Chana is an Orthodox Jewish seminary for women located in Melbourne, Australia. It is part of the Chabad Lubavitch hasidic movement. The center is managed by Rebbetzin Rivkah Groner. The seminary is named after Chana Schneerson, the mother of the last Rebbe of Chabad Lubavitch, Menachem Mendel Schneerson. The center was founded in 1971.

== See also ==
- Orthodox yeshivas in Australia
- Judaism in Australia
