= Talpiot College of Education =

Religious teacher training college in Holon, Israel

Coordinates: 32°0′34.03″N 34°45′47.84″E

- המכללה האקדמית תלפיות
- Established: 1937
- Accreditation: Council for Higher Education in Israel
- Location: Holon, Israel
- Website: www.talpiot.ac.il

The Talpiot College of Education (המכללה האקדמית תלפיות) is a religious teacher training college in Holon, Israel. It prepares teachers “in the spirit of the Mamlachti dati (state religious) education system”.

It was founded in 1937 by Jacob Alishkovsky and was originally called the "Talpiot Beit Midrash for Kindergarten Teachers".

The college is accredited by the Council for Higher Education in Israel and offers specialized Bachelor of Education degrees in the following tracks: early childhood; elementary school; secondary school; special education; educational counseling.

The college established Midreshet Aviv in 1998 as an institution of Torah Study “lishma” (for its own sake). Midreshet Binat is also associated with the college.

== Midreshet Aviv ==
Midreshet Aviv is a Midrasha in Tel Aviv. It was founded in 1996 by Rabbi Yaakov Ariel, in conjunction with the Talpiot College of Education. Midreshet Aviv's goal is to cater to the small orthodox community in Tel Aviv, with a focus on the girls wishing to strengthening their religious knowledge and commitment. As of 2013 the school had 400 students.

The Midrasha offers several programs.

- A full program of Torah study.
- A program allowing students to combine their religious studies with other interests.
- A program for women aged 22–23 with previous backgrounds in Torah study.
- A program aimed at specialization in the therapy based professions, intended to allow practitioners to introduce Torah based techniques to their professions.

The Midrasha and its students are continuously involved with community based work centred in Tel Aviv, an opportunity to strengthen Torah values in the Gush Dan area.

== See also ==
- Herzog College
- Lifshitz College of Education
- Machon Gold
- Michlala
- Migdal Oz (seminary)
- Tal Institute
- Ein HaNatziv Women's Seminary
