= Ulpana =

Girls-only Jewish high school in Israel

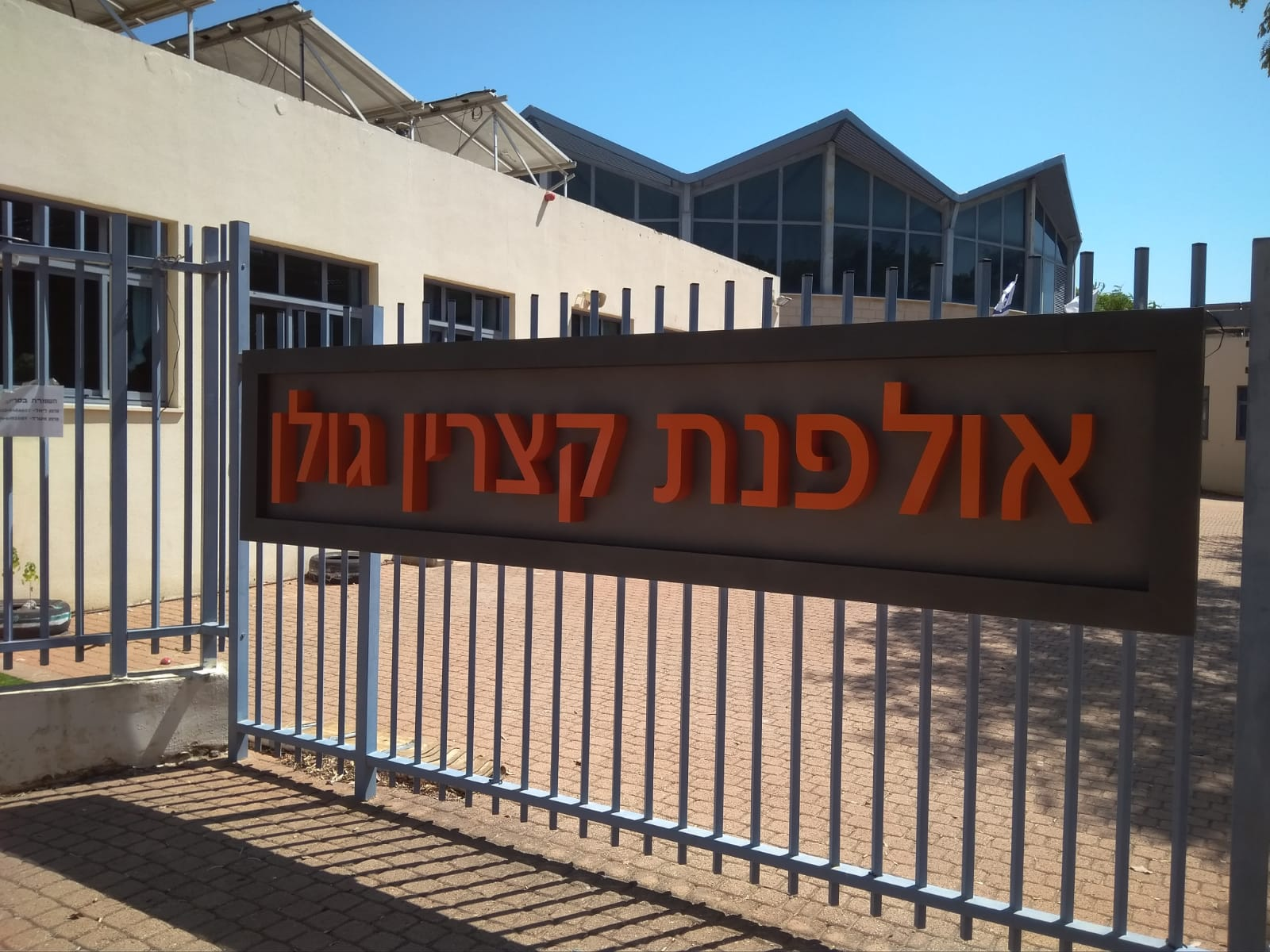
Ulpana in Katzrin, Golan Heights

Ulpana (Hebrew: אוּלְפֶּנָה) is a girls-only Jewish high school in Israel, delivering reinforcement of religious education and social activities, alongside the state curriculum. The Ulpana is to be found primarily in the religious communities. It is the equivalent of a Mamlachti dati boys-only yeshiva high school ("Yeshiva Tichonit"). Post high school, women often proceed to study at a Midrasha, or to undertake Sherut Leumi.

== Etymology ==
The name Ulpana was used among the Jewish commentaries on the Bible in the language Aramaic and is cited for example in Targum Onkelos (Onkelos translation) to the Bible parashah "Ki Tissa", where he translates the verse "And he called it a tent of Meeting" (Book of Exodus 33:7) – "And he called it an Ulpana house", because in this tent the Torah study and its teaching took place, or in Rashi's commentary of the verse "And she dwelt in Jerusalem, in the Mishneh" (Books of Chronicles 2 34:22) – "and his translation is a Ulpana house meaning in a place of Torah".

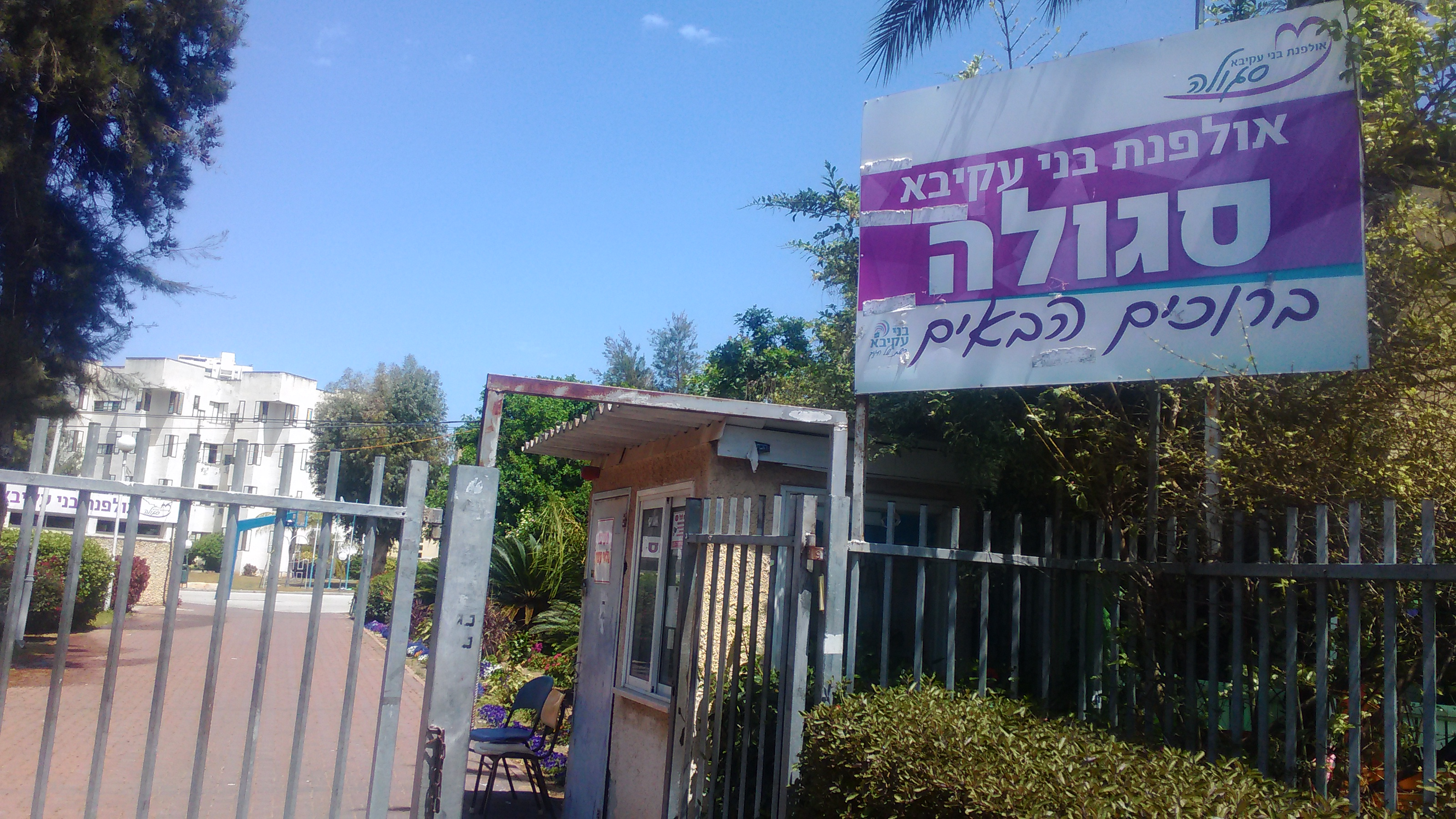
Segula Ulpana in Kiryat Motzkin

== See also ==
- He:אולפנה for further discussion and a listing of these
- Religious Zionism § Educational institutions
- Education in Israel § Educational tracks
- Bais Yaakov, Haredi elementary and secondary girls' schools
- Single-sex education
