= Hashkafa =

Orthodox Jewish worldview and philosophy

Hashkafa (Hebrew: השקפה, lit. 'outlook'; plural hashkafot, hashkafos, or hashkafas) is the Hebrew term for worldview and guiding philosophy, used almost exclusively within Orthodox Judaism. A hashkafa is the perspective an Orthodox Jew adopts, which shapes many aspects of their life. Hashkafa thus plays a crucial role in how these interact with the world around them, and influences individual beliefs about secularity, gender roles, and modernity. In that it guides many practical decisions—where to send children to school, what synagogue to attend, and what community to live in—hashkafa works in conjunction with halakha or Jewish law.

== Hashkafot ==
Although there are numerous hashkafot within Orthodox Judaism—allegorically there are "seventy faces to Torah" (shivim panim la-Torah) according to Numbers Rabbah 13:15, they may be grouped broadly as Haredi, Hasidic and Modern Orthodox / Religious Zionist, with different approaches and emphases concerning specific topics. Other hashkafot include Torah im Derech Eretz, Talmidei haRambam, the Carlebach movement, and Open Orthodoxy.

=== Modern Orthodox ===
Both Modern Orthodoxy and Religious Zionism are hashkafot where the Torah community interfaces substantively with the secular, modern world, each from its own perspective, and with much overlap. Although not identical, these then share many of the same values and practices.

- Modern Orthodox is a stream of Orthodox Judaism that attempts to "synthesize" the secular, modern world with traditional Jewish values and the observance of halakha, or Jewish law. Modern Orthodox Jews value secular knowledge and are culturally, educationally and politically, as well as practically, engaged in society. See Torah Umadda.
- Religious Zionism combines Zionism and Torah observance, and views secular activities in support of Israel, including military service, as religiously important. Adherents are thus similarly engaged with secular Israeli society and are active in politics.

Modern Orthodoxy traces its roots to the late 1800s works of Azriel Hildesheimer and Samson Raphael Hirsch, and in the 20th century, to the teachings and philosophy of Joseph B. Soloveitchik. Abraham Isaac Kook's thinking, as well as the writings and interpretations of his son Zvi Yehuda Kook, are foundational to Religious Zionism, and also influential on Modern Orthodoxy. See Modern Orthodox Judaism § Philosophy and Religious Zionism § History.

=== Haredi Judaism ===
Non-Hasidic Haredi Jews, also called Yeshivishe, Misnagdim, or Litvaks, belong to a stream of Orthodox Judaism that essentially rejects modern secular culture. In contrast to Modern Orthodox Jews who embrace the modern world (within limits), Haredim follow a strict reading by segregating themselves from modern society. The emphasis is on Torah study and exact observance of halakha, and secular interactions are thus limited to the practical, such as (circumscribed modes of) earning a living.

There is some variation: especially in Israel, Haredis are fully separated from secular society; in the Western world, Haredi life often realizes as Torah U’Parnasah, "Torah combined with a livelihood", sometimes extending to professional life with its requisite education, although many do choose full time kollel (Torah study) as in Israel.

Haredi Judaism emerged in response to the Jewish assimilation and secularization during the Enlightenment era with hopes to decrease the influence of secular society on Judaism; see Moses Sofer § Influence against changes in Judaism and for discussion re practice, Torah im Derech Eretz § Earning a livelihood.

==== Hasidic Judaism ====
Hasidic Judaism is a stream of Haredi Judaism that emphasizes spirituality and Jewish mysticism as fundamental to faith. Like other Haredim, this community emphasizes halakhic observance and is insulated from the secular world. However, unlike the practices of non-Hasidic Haredim, its practices are influenced by mysticism. Thus, here:

- There is variation in terms of engagement with secular society: some branches such as Chabad and Breslov, are actively engaged; groups such as the Satmar are entirely isolated, often living in their own enclaves or even towns.
- Hasidic practices differs somewhat from that of the rest of the Haredi world because they additionally emphasize (i) the relationship with their Rebbe (and correspondingly the literature emphasized); (ii) spiritually-directed individual practices such as hitbodedut (meditation) and mikveh (ritual immersion); and (iii) communal activities, such as the tish and farbrengen.

Hasidism was founded in Western Ukraine during the 18th century by the Baal Shem Tov, and spread rapidly throughout Eastern Europe. It arose as a spiritual revival movement, emphasizing the importance of joy and happiness at worship and religious life, and the need to cleave and be one with God at all times. See Hasidic Judaism § Distinctions and Hasidic philosophy.

== Specific topics ==
=== Secular knowledge ===
Judaism values secular knowledge and the Gentiles who study it. The Talmud, in tractate Berakhot 58a, says that one who sees a non-Jewish scholar should make this blessing: "Blessed be He who gave His wisdom to flesh and blood."

However, the extent to which a Jew should immerse himself in secular knowledge is contentious. Some argue that the pursuit of secular knowledge complements and refines the understanding of Jewish religious knowledge. This is a fundamental principle of Torah Umadda, an idea closely associated with Yeshiva University. Others view secular knowledge as a worthwhile endeavor as long as it serves a practical end, such as learning biology to become a physician.

Others vehemently oppose pursuing secular knowledge, believing it is not valuable enough. Some even believe that secular knowledge is dangerous because it contains ideas that are antithetical to the Torah and can cause people to stray from their religious life. Evolution is one popular example.

=== Modernity ===
Because Orthodox Judaism is so deeply entrenched in its tradition, the question of how to incorporate and adapt to modernity, in terms modern of culture and thought, lies at the center of disagreements between Orthodox groups. Modern Orthodox Jews view their interactions with the world around them and the development of society as an integral part of their theology. They do not view modernity as a threat; they embrace it. Modern Orthodox Jews are likely to view themselves as citizens of the modern world. Great Jewish thinkers such as Samson Raphael Hirsch and Joseph B. Soloveitchik sometimes integrated modern thought into their worldview. Hasidism is generally opposed to the idea of integrating modern ideas and culture into their well-established theological thought. Hasidic Jews do not wear modern clothing, while Modern Orthodox Jews find no objection to it, provided that the clothing is modest.

=== Gender roles ===
The appropriate role of women in Jewish life and society at large varies across the spectrum of hashkafot. Hashkafot that more readily incorporate modern thought into Jewish life, tend to believe in greater gender equality. However, they will not ignore the framework of Halacha and sacrifice adherence to Jewish tradition for this end.

Some hashkafot do not address or value gender equality; consequently, distinct gender roles are magnified. Many women, especially within the Hasidic community, take pride in their unique role as homemakers, and make their family and children their main focus.

Currently, there is much disagreement about the educational curriculum for women, particularly if the Talmud may be studied by women. With the exception of Modern Orthodoxy, the majority of hashkafot do not allow women to study Talmud, although in most non-Hasidic communities, they do study other texts inside. See under Midrasha § Curriculum.

=== Redemption ===
Since the emergence of the Zionist movement, many questions have arisen about the permissibility of an autonomous Jewish state in the Holy Land before the arrival of the Messiah. This issue is especially complicated because the Jewish homeland is partly governed by secular Jews who are not strictly Orthodox. Modern-day Israel is thus a particularly contentious subject because the boundary between hashkafa and halakha in this area is blurred.

Some oppose Israel in its entirety and reject its legitimacy; see Three Oaths. Religious Zionists and Modern Orthodox Jews view Israel as the first step in the process of redemption; Torat Eretz Yisrael is a body of writing devoted to this topic. Certain Hasidic groups, of which Satmar is the largest and best-known, believe that an autonomous Jewish state in the Holy Land is forbidden by halakha and label Zionists as heretics.

=== Social life ===
For many within the Orthodox Jewish world, self-identity stems from subscribing to a specific hashkafa; therefore, hashkafa plays a central role in the social life of observant Jews. Hashkafot create cultures that can be very different. In the United States, Modern Orthodox Jews cluster to form tight-knit communities that have their own synagogues, high schools, and community centers. Hasidic Jews also tend to live amongst themselves because cross-cultural social integration is difficult. Jews of similar hashkafot prefer to live together because they share much in common.

==== Marriage and dating: shidduchim ====
Shidduchim, the practice of matching two people for marriage, is heavily influenced by hashkafot. Jewish blogs are rife with posts about the marital compatibility of men and women who have different hashkafot. Dating websites, like JWed.com and JDate, require members to fill in a box about their hashkafa. People assume that if a husband and wife have similar hashkafot, they will most likely have a happy marriage.

==== Head covering: kippah ====
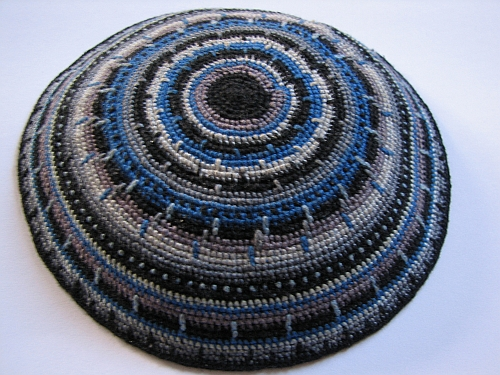
Knitted Kippah Srugah or "Srugie"

The type of head covering that a man wears is often seen to be an expression of the hashkafa he subscribes to; see discussion below.

Members of most Haredi and Hasidic groups wear black velvet or cloth yarmulkes (skullcaps; in Hebrew kippot, sing. kippah); men in these communities also wear a black, wide-brimmed hat, often a Borsalino. See Haredi Judaism § Dress and Hasidic Judaism § Appearance, and Kippah § Types and variation.

Religious Zionists and Modern Orthodox tend to wear knitted, colored kippot. These are sometimes affectionately, and sometimes derogatorily, referred to as a "srugie" (i. e., "knitted" or "crocheted"). See Religious Zionism § Dress.

As mentioned, many believe that kippot are self-conscious manifestations of a person's hashkafic orientation and social affiliation. This superficial, and often misguided, habit to pigeonhole people based on head coverings has been criticized.

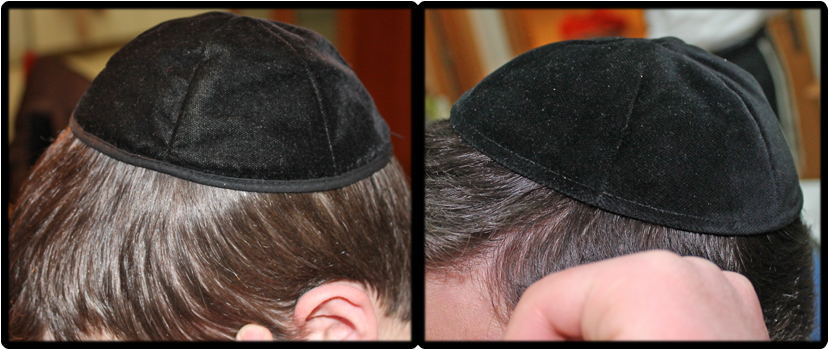
Black Velvet "Yarmulke"

== Non-Orthodox hashkafas ==
Taken at its broadest and simplest definition, hashkafa is the overarching Torah principles that guide human action. In this sense, the term is significant to nearly all Jewish denominations that share certain tenets articulated in the Torah, particularly from a humanistic and philosophical perspective. One such example is the principle of tikkun olam, taken to mean fixing the world and making it a better place, which is not a sectarian belief. Reform Jews, Conservative Jews, and Orthodox Jews all value and emphasize this principle, but each endeavor to fulfill this concept differently based upon their respective traditions. Nonetheless, the term hashkafa itself generally is used only within the Orthodox community and refers solely to their guiding philosophies.

== See also ==
- Jewish fundamentalism
- Orthodox Judaism and esp. Orthodox Judaism § Diversity
- Relationships between Jewish religious movements
- Morality and religion
