= JWed.com =

Online Jewish dating service

JWed.com is an online dating service aimed at Jewish singles. The website, co-founded in 2001 by Ben Rabizadeh and Derek Saker, followed a predecessor called Dosidate, launched in 1997.

JWed is an available service both through the website and the app. The latest version of the JWed app was released June 2024.

== History ==
Between 2001 and 2012 the site was called Frumster, a play on the term Frum and a joke by Rob Schneider.

In October 2012, Frumster.com changed its name to JWed.com. JWed launched in 2007 as a white-label site, sharing profile listings with Frumster.com until the name was completely changed 2012.

The site attracted criticism in 2004 for refusing profiles from people describing themselves as Conservative Jews.

In 2021 the site expanded operations by acquiring SuperTova.com.

== Membership and marriages ==
In December 2005 the site said it had 20,000+ members and had facilitated over 500 known marriages. JWed CEO Derek Saker says that of June 2025, the site has over 80,000 members and has facilitated over 4,000 known marriages.

The site is open to all marriage-minded Jewish singles be they Orthodox observant or halachically Jewish singles.

== See also ==
- Shidduch
