= Women rabbis and Torah scholars =

Jewish women in religious leadership

Women rabbis and Torah scholars are Jewish women who have received formal semikhah (rabbinic ordination) as rabbis or are recognized for their studies and contributions to Jewish religious tradition, respectively. The ordination of women in Judaism has grown since the 1970s, with thousands of Jewish women having received formal ordination since then (see § Membership by denomination). The majority of them have been associated with progressive Jewish religious movements, including Reform Judaism, Conservative Judaism, Liberal Judaism (in the United Kingdom), Reconstructionist Judaism, and Jewish Renewal. In Orthodox Judaism, the issue of women's ordination is complex and has not reached a consensus. Although a large and growing number of Orthodox women have received rabbinic ordination, many major Orthodox communities and institutions reject women's credentials if not ordination. As an alternative approach, some Orthodox Jewish institutions train women for various formal Jewish religious leadership roles, including entail training in Halakha, but no formal rabbinic ordination is granted. Instead, women receive alternative titles. These women, even with their alternative titles, are often perceived as equivalent to traditionally ordained (i.e., male) rabbis.

Notwithstanding early examples in Jewish biblical and rabbinic tradition, such as Deborah and Bruriah, for much of Jewish history the recognizable roles of the rabbi (rav), preacher (darshan), and Torah scholar (talmid chacham) were almost exclusively limited to Jewish men. With few, rare historical exceptions, such as the case of Asenath Barzani, Jewish women were first offered the possibility for ordination or an equivalent role beginning in the 1920s, but it was not until the 1970s when this became widely accepted. Early efforts to ordain women date to the late 19th and early 20th century. A small cohort of women are recorded as being candidates for ordination; however, eventually, nearly all were denied ordination. During the 1930s, Regina Jonas of Germany became the first recorded instance of a Jewish woman in modern times receiving formal rabbinical ordination. Subsequent decades saw women-led campaigns within Reform Judaism for the recognition of women rabbis. These campaigns also coincided with the influence of second-wave feminism on Western society. These efforts culminated in the 1972 ordination of Sally Priesand at Hebrew Union College, the flagship institution of Reform Judaism. Subsequently, women rabbis were ordained by all other branches of Progressive Judaism. The formal ordination of women rabbis in Orthodox Judaism began in the 2000s, however its acceptance within Orthodoxy is still a highly contested issue. Nonetheless, in the early 2020s, the State of Israel approved legislation to allow all Jewish women to qualify for the state rabbinic examinations, effectively giving Orthodox women a credential equivalent to those of male rabbis. However, the uses of this credential are limited to certain rabbinic roles.

== Historical background ==
Prior to the 1970s, when ordination of women gained wider acceptance, there are various examples of Jewish women who were formally considered as rabbis, rabbinic authorities, or Torah scholars. However, these instances recorded throughout Jewish history and tradition were perceived as rare, and highly exceptional cases of women occupying rabbinic posts.

=== Biblical and Talmudic traditions ===
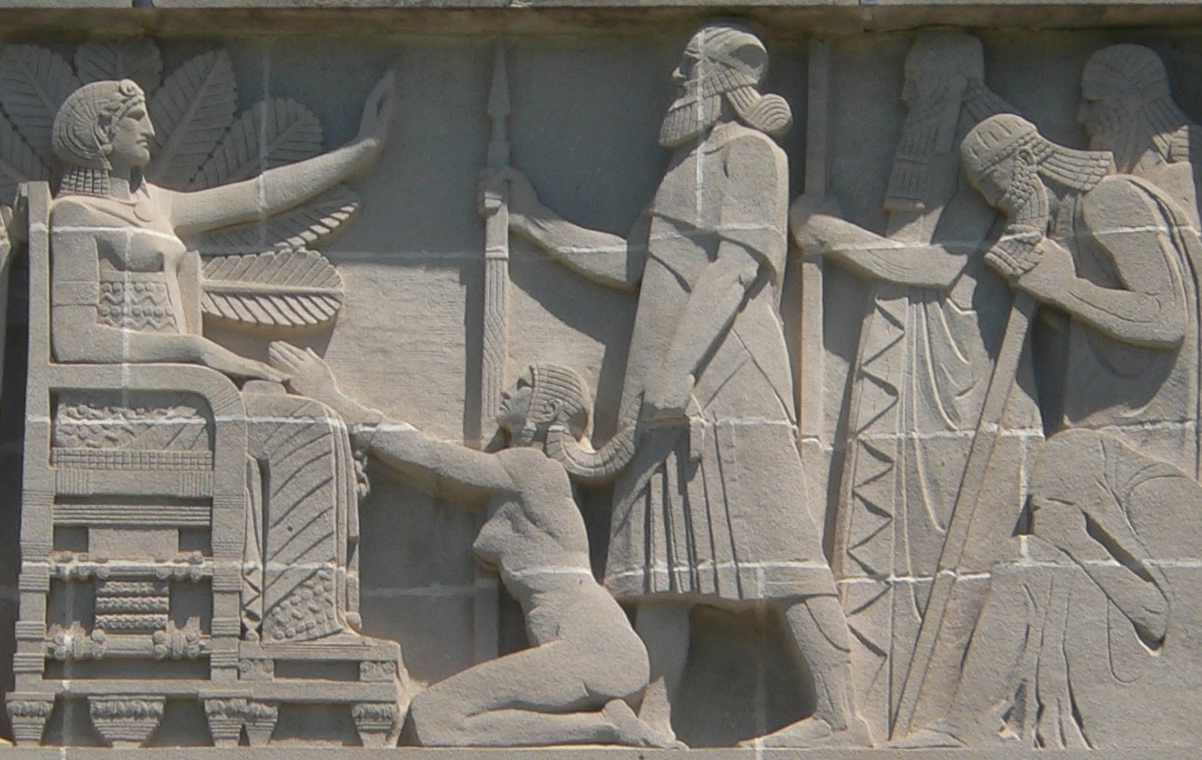
Mural depicting Deborah serving as judge

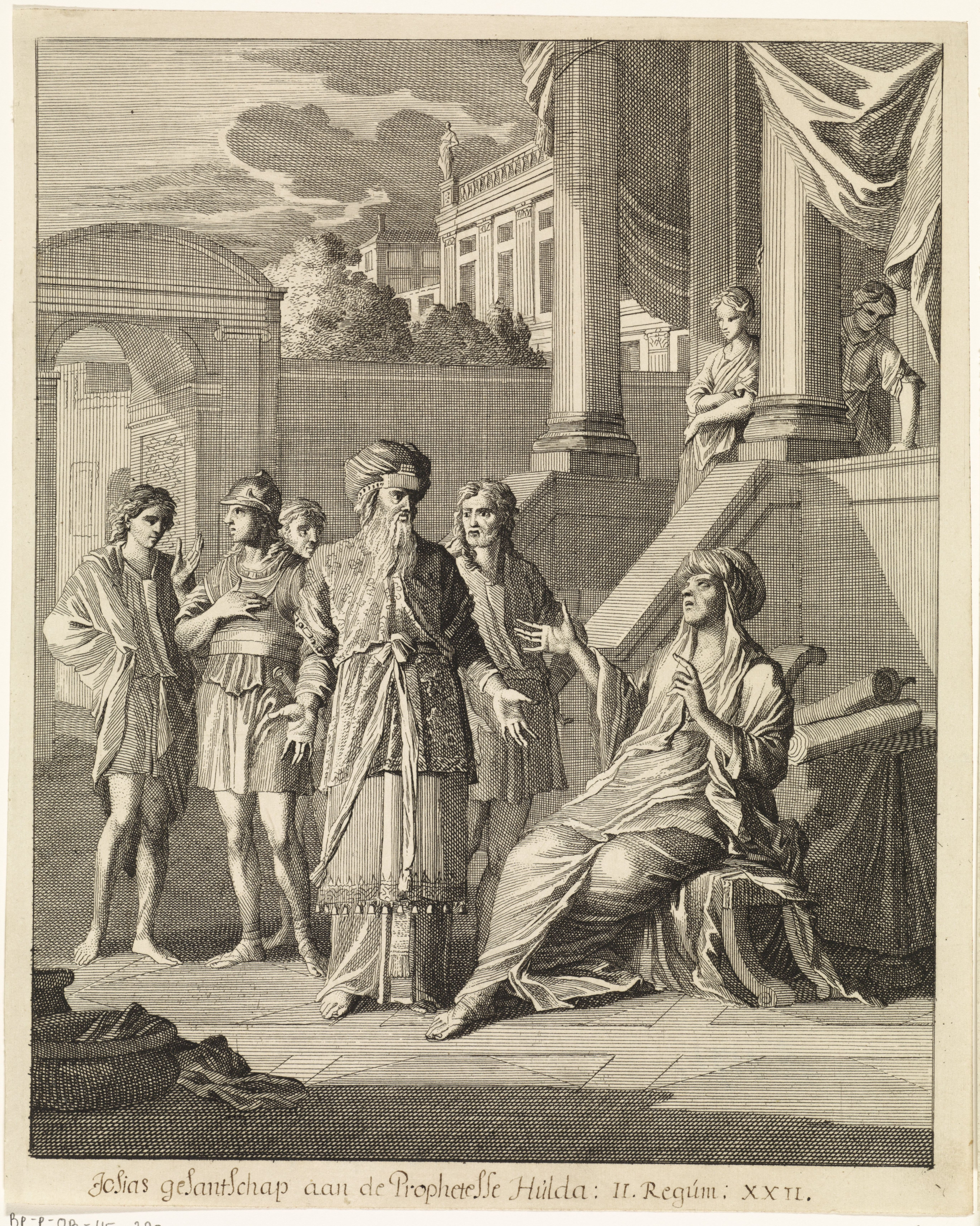
Depiction of Huldah the prophetess

In the early portions of the Bible, the Hebrew Matriarchs seem to only be mentioned in connection with their husbands or sons, indicating an absence of the feminine voice and narrative in biblical history, an understandable position in a patriarchal society. However, in the rabbinic tradition, the position of the matriarchs are reinterpreted to highlight their honored status, minimizing actions in the biblical narrative that indicate wrongdoing on their part. Additionally, they are classified as prophetesses whose merit is relied upon by later Jewish generations. The exact number of prophetess-matriarchs included in this tradition is unclear. Many sources list Sarah, Rebekah, Leah and Rachel (the wives of the Hebrew Patriarchs), while other sources include Bilhah and Zilpah (Jacob's concubine wives). But while rabbinic views of the matriarchs appear to enhance the status of these women, including a teaching that Sarah converted women to her religion, the matriarchs do not appear as leaders for the entire Hebrew clan.

This view of ancient Hebrew women appears to change in the later books of the bible. The biblical figure of Deborah the prophetess is described as serving as a judge (Judges 4–5). According to traditional rabbinic sources, Deborah's judiciary role primarily concerned religious law. Thus, according to this view, Deborah was Judaism's first female religious legal authority, equivalent to the contemporary rabbinical role of posek (rabbinic decisor of Jewish Law). Other rabbinic sources understand the biblical story of Deborah that her role was only that of a national leader and not of a legal authority. Alternatively, other Rabbinic authorities understand Deborah's role to be one that advised Jewish judges, but she herself did not render religious legal rulings. The biblical figure of Huldah the prophetess is understood as functioning in the role of an expert in the Israelite religion. Her contribution is recorded as verifying the legitimacy of changes to the religious practices in ancient Judaism enacted under King Josiah. There are two versions of Huldah's involvement in the Josiah reforms, the first recorded in Kings II (22:12–20), the second in Chronicles II (34:20–28), and scholars infer points of difference between the versions. Other scholars note Huldah's mark on the urban landscape of the Israelite temple as an indication of her stature in Israelite society. Huldah's character has led to speculation as to the extent of her involvement in writing the Hebrew scriptures using computer programs to dicipher forms of Hebrew anagrams. However, in reviewing this work, scholars have criticized these findings as flawed owing to the highly speculative methodology.

In Talmudic literature, women are generally excluded from the project of rabbinic interpretation and legal decision making. Nevertheless, the Talmudic figure of Bruriah (2nd century) is described as participating in Jewish legal debates, challenging the rabbis of the time. Aside from Bruriah, another Talmudic woman, Yalta (wife of Rav Nachman and daughter of the Exilarch) is noted for her scholarship. Recent research has complicated the narrative that women in the times of the Talmud did not study Torah. Close readings of various Talmudic passages point to the familiarity of Torah and rabbinic teachings among women in rabbinic families.

=== Medieval and early modern ages ===
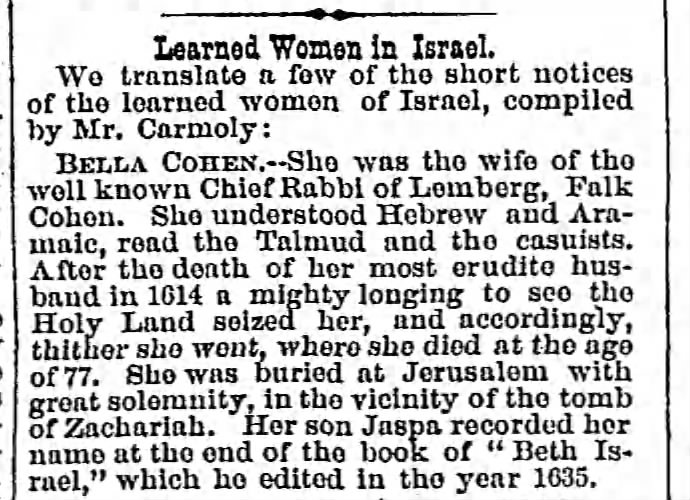
Description of Bella Cohen (Bayla Falk) as a Torah scholar (The American Israelite, April 19, 1867)

The history of medieval Jewish women includes various individual forerunners to the modern notion of women rabbis and Torah scholars. The daughters of Rabbi Shlomo Yitzchaki, known as Rashi, living in France in the 11th–12th century, are the subject of Jewish legends claiming that they possessed unusual Torah scholarship. In the 12th century, Bat ha-Levi flourished in Iraq. In the 13th century, a Jewish woman in Italy named Paula Dei Mansi served as a scribe and scholar. In Germany, during the 15th century, Miriam Shapira-Luria was known to have conducted a yeshiva (a higher institution for the study of central Jewish texts) and gave public lectures on Jewish codes of law. Also in Italy, during the 16th century, Fioretta of Modena was regarded as a Torah scholar. Eva Bacharach (c. 1580–1651) was a rabbinical scholar in Prague, the daughter and granddaughter or notable rabbis. A similar case is Bayla Falk, wife of Joshua Falk. Examples of Jewish women who authored Jewish texts from this period include Rebecca bat Meir Tiktiner and Devorà Ascarelli.

It is claimed that in one instance a medieval Jewish woman served as rabbi. In this case, Asenath Barzani of Iraq is considered by scholars as the first woman rabbi of Jewish history; additionally, Barzani is the oldest recorded female Kurdish leader in history. The title referred to Barzani by the Jews of Kurdistan was Tannait, the feminine equivalent of Tanna, the title for a Jewish sage of the early Talmudic rabbis. According to researchers, the origin of the Barzani story is the travelogue of Rabbi Petachiah of Regensburg.

In the early modern era, there were cases of Jewish women translating scholarly texts from Hebrew into Yiddish such as Ellus bat Mordecai of Slutsk who published translations on a Jewish legal guide to laws concerning death and burial.

=== Hasidism ===
In Eastern European Hasidic Judaism, during the early 19th-century, Hannah Rachel Verbermacher, also known as the Maiden of Ludmir, became the movement's only female Hasidic rebbe, however, the role of rebbe relates to spiritual and communal leadership as opposed to the legal authority of "rabbi". Other instances have been preserved of Hasidic rebbetzins (wives of Hasidic rebbes) who "acted similar to" Hasidic rebbes and were therefore de facto women Rebbes. These include Malka, the daughter of Rabbi Avraham Twersky (1806–1889), the "Maggid of Trisk" (Trisk is an offshoot of the Chernobyl Hasidic dynasty), and Sarah Horowitz-Sternfeld (d. 1939), known as the Khentshiner Rebbetzin, based in Chęciny, Poland. In the second half of the 20th century, the only recorded instance of a de facto woman to lead a Hasidic faction was Faige Teitelbaum (1912–2001) of the Satmar Hasidic community who assumed a quasi-leadership role following the death of her husband, Rabbi Joel Teitelbaum, in 1979.

=== Modern age ===
==== 1870s–1890s ====
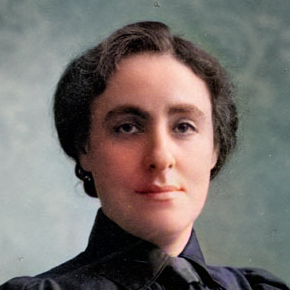
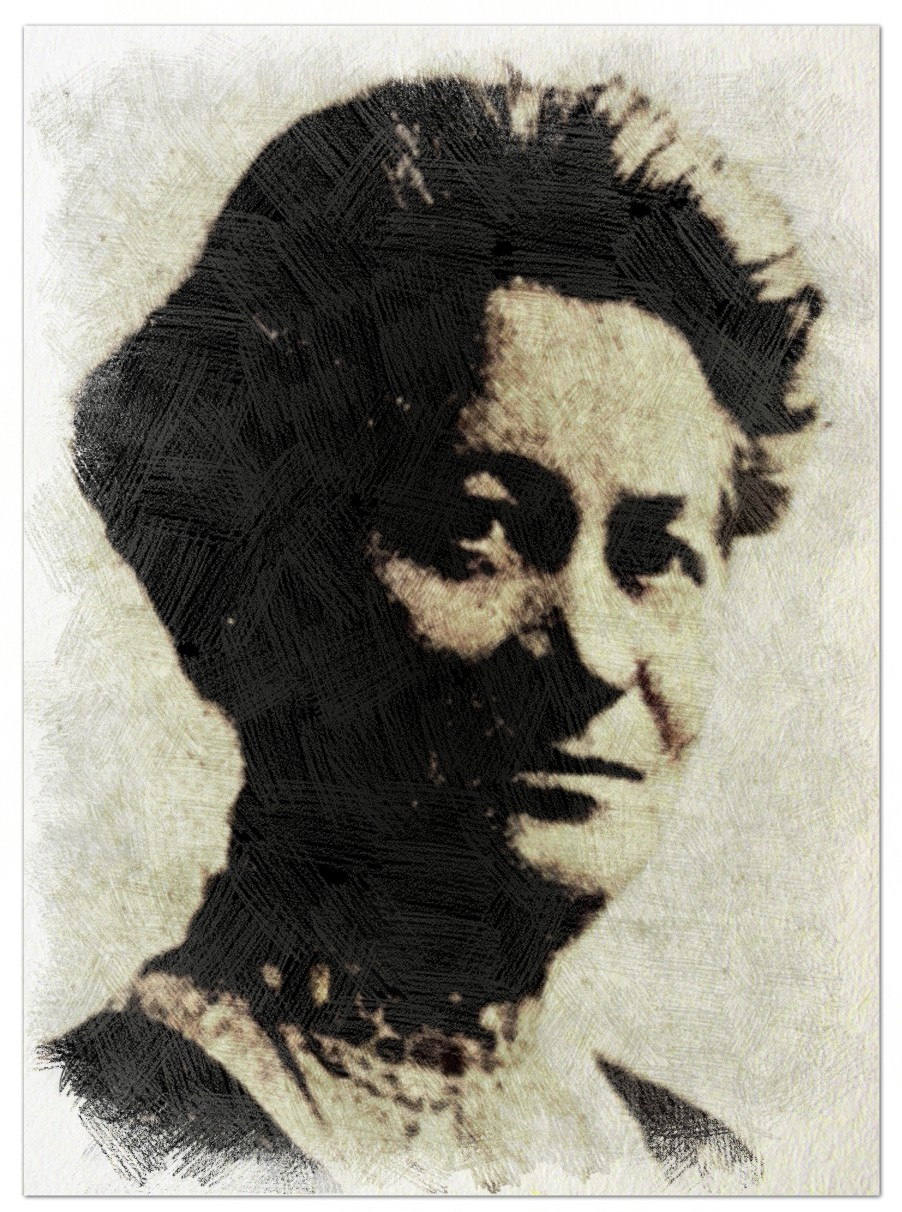
L-R: Ray Frank, Hannah G. Solomon — Jewish women preachers active in the 1890s

The possibility of women rabbis gaining mainstream acceptance began in the late 19th century. An 1871 report on the early career of Susanna Rubinstein pointed to her scholarship as indication of the possibility of women rabbis. An 1875 article describing the inaugural class at Hebrew Union College highlighted that the fourteenth student accepted into the course was Miss Julia Ettlinger (1863–1890), the college's first female student. The report speculated that Ettlinger could serve as a rabbi after graduation. One of the early proponents for women to be trained as rabbis was the journalist Mary M. Cohen who in 1889 authored an article in the Jewish Exponent, a Jewish newspaper in Philadelphia. in which fictional characters articulate arguments for the ordination of women. Similarly, in the 1893 Jewish Women's Congress the call was made by speakers for women to be ordained as rabbis. In the United States, there was one early example of a Jewish woman who, without formal ordination, assumed certain functions typically associated with congregational rabbis. During the 1890s, a young woman living on the American frontier named Rachel ("Ray") Frank assumed a religious leadership role, delivering sermons, giving public lectures and reading scripture. She was referred to as a woman rabbi in the American Jewish press, however, she appeared to have avoided claiming such a title. Frank continued to preach until her marriage to Simon Litman in 1899.

Another early report of a Jewish woman who seemed poised to become a rabbi was Lena Aronsohn of Hot Springs, Arkansas. In 1892 and 1893, Aronsohn was reported to have set out to become a rabbi. According to one account, Aronsohn began providing public lectures to the Jewish community in Shreveport, Louisiana to earn enough money to pursue her rabbinical training. In 1897, Hannah G. Solomon of Chicago was touted as America's first woman rabbi following her preaching at Sinai Temple. Solomon later reported that the invitation to speak was offered by Rabbi Emil G. Hirsch and that Hirsch's practice to allow Jewish women to speak from the pulpit was later adopted by other congregations.

==== 1900s ====
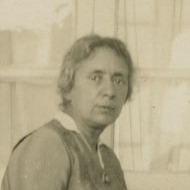
In the early 1900s, Henrietta Szold was admitted into a rabbinical school on condition she would not receive ordination.

The turn of the century saw at least one instance of a young Jewish woman set to undergo rabbinical training, even if no ordination would be provided. In 1904, the National Council of Jewish Women in New York City announced that Henrietta Szold would undertake rabbinical studies but would receive no graduating diploma upon completing the course. In 1908, Mrs Anna G. Abelson of Akron, Ohio reportedly assumed the role of rabbi in her husband's absence. Her appearance before the puplit received coverage in both the Jewish and the general press.

==== 1920s ====
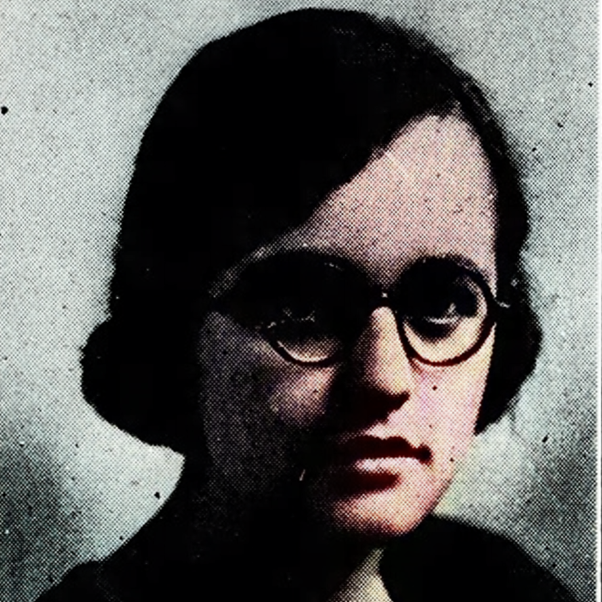
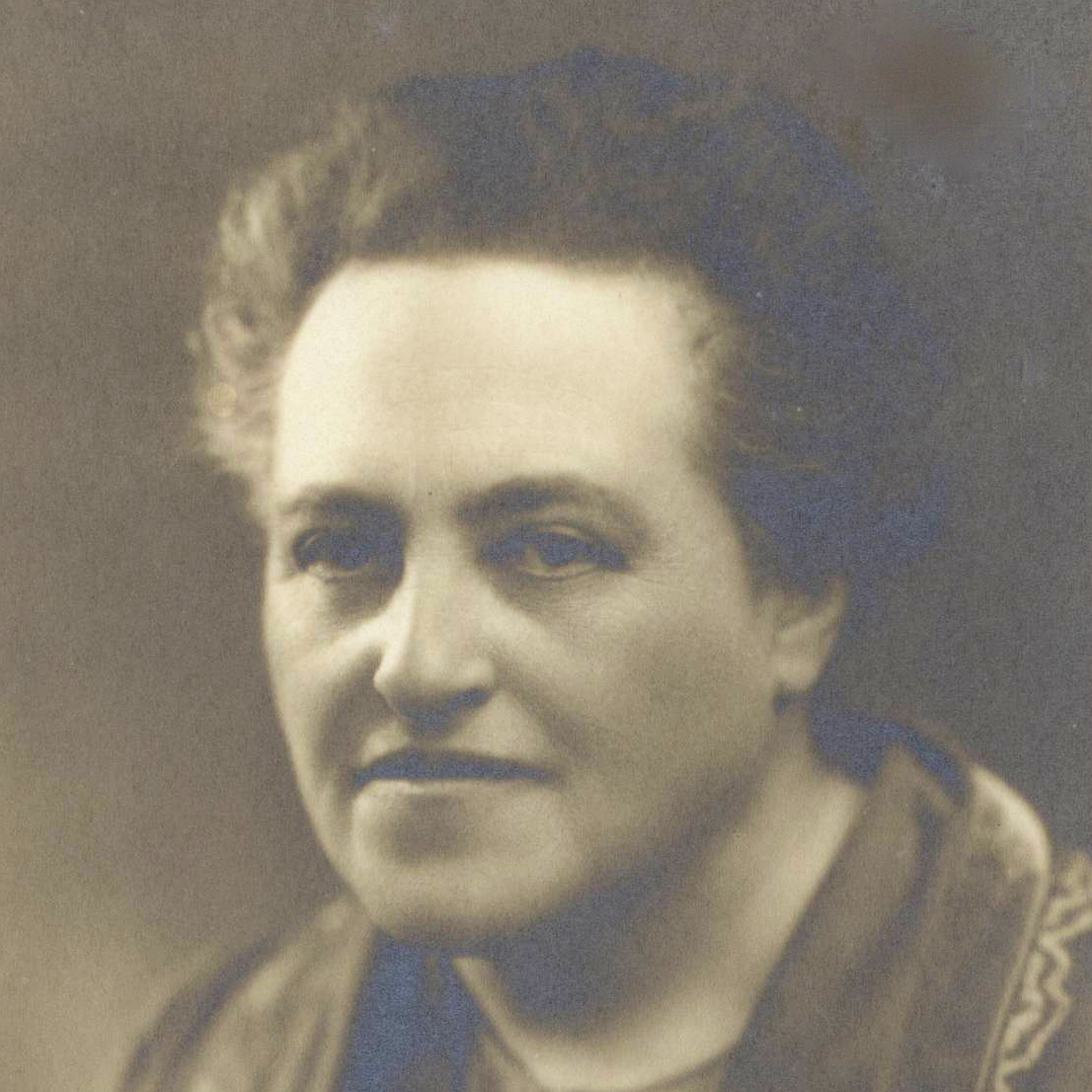
L-R: Martha Neumark (rabbinical student), Irma Lindheim (rabbinical student), Lily Montagu (congregational leader), Avis Clamitz (rabbinical student and informal rabbi)

The third decade of the 20th century saw an increased effort to ordain women rabbis with several women enrolling in rabbinical programs. During this time, the first American Jewish woman reported to be admitted to a rabbinical school was Martha Neumark. Neumark was born in Berlin in 1904 and arrived in the US in 1907. In the early 1920s, Neumark was accepted to Reform Judaism's Hebrew Union College (HUC). Neumark also reportedly led services at a congregation in Frankfort, Michigan. Her entry into the HUC rabbinical program led to a 1922 resolution from the Central Conference of American Rabbis (CCAR) that allowed women to be ordained, however, in 1923, the governing board of Hebrew Union College voted to bar women from receiving ordination. Neumark withdrew from the rabbinical program after completing seven out of the nine years required for the completion of the program.

At the same time as Neumark's entry into the rabbinical program, other American Jewish women also began studies for rabbinical ordination and were later denied formal ordination or left the program. These include Helen Levinthal, Avis Clamitz, Dora Askowith and Irma Lindheim. In the case of Helen Levinthal, formal ordination was denied to her after completing her studies in 1935. She only received a Master of Hebrew Letters (and a certificate recognizing her accomplishment) upon graduation, rather than a Master of Hebrew Letters and ordination as the men received, since the faculty felt it was not yet time for women's ordination as rabbis. In the mid-1920s, Avis Clamitz (wife of Charles E. Shulman) enrolled in a rabbinical program and later periodically served as a rabbi in an unofficial capacity for small congregations in Virginia. Dora Askowith, born in Kovno and a graduate of Barnard College and Columbia University, was a lecturer at Hunter College from 1912 to 1957. During the 1920s, Askowith enrolled in a rabbinical studies program. Irma Lindheim, the National President of Hadassah Women's Zionist Organization of America was reported to be enrolled as a candidate for rabbinical ordination.

Around this time in Germany, the Hochschule für die Wissenschaft des Judentums, the rabbinic seminary of German Jewry began admitting women to study higher learning without the offer of ordination. The first woman to graduate from the seminary was Ellen Littmann (1909–1975) who later went on to teach biblical studies at Leo Baeck College in London.

Meanwhile, in England, there was one notable instance of a Jewish woman receiving a formally appointment for a position within a synagogue. In 1928, Lily Montagu, a leader within Liberal Judaism in England, became a lay minister of the West Central Liberal Jewish Congregation.

==== 1930s–1950s ====
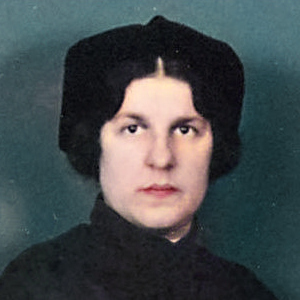
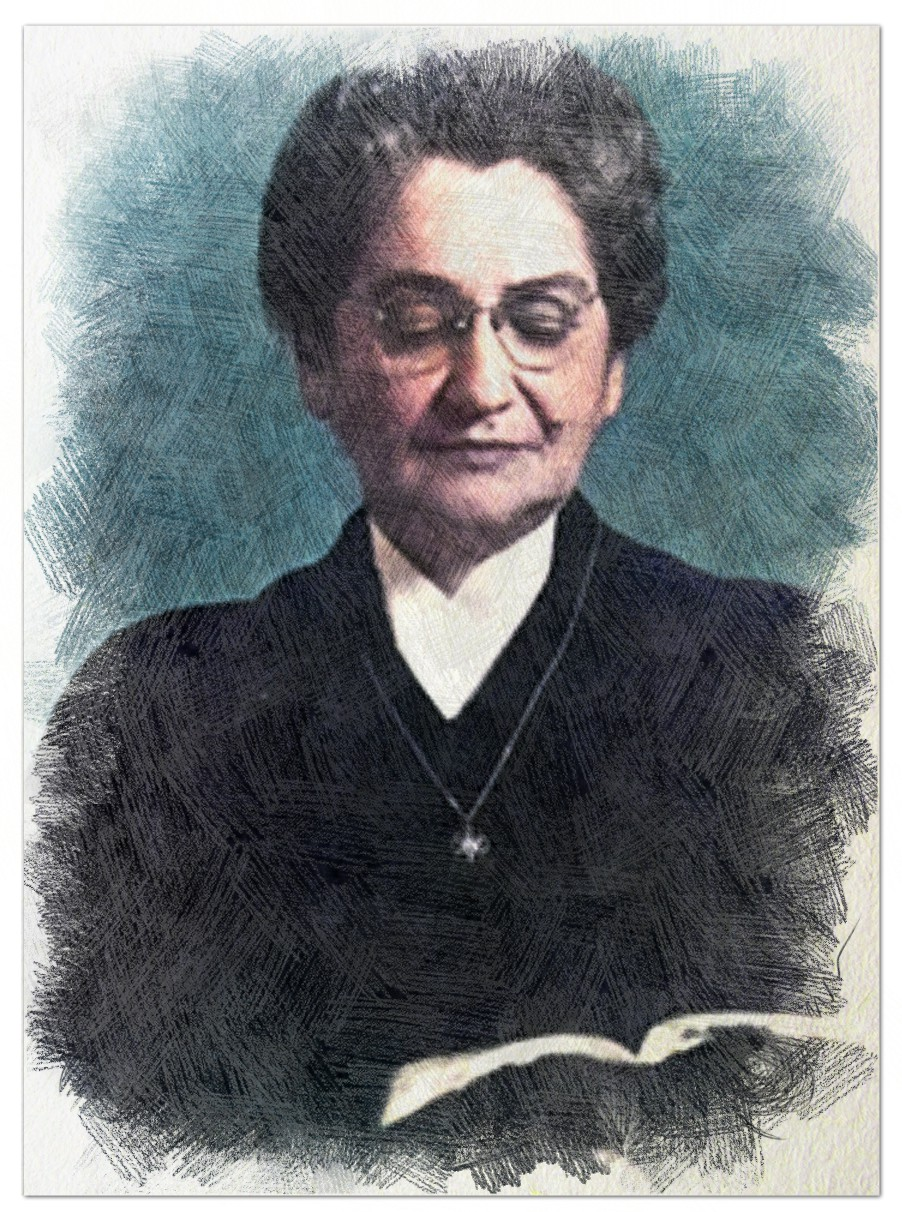
L-R: Regina Jonas (first formally ordained woman rabbi), Helen Levinthal (completed rabbinical training but was denied ordination), Tehilla Lichtenstein (congregational leader), Paula Ackerman (interim rabbi)

The 1930s saw the first formally ordained female rabbi in modern times. Regina Jonas was ordained in Berlin, Germany in 1935. Jonas was later murdered by the Nazis during the Holocaust and her existence was mostly unknown in the decades following World War Two. Also during this time, there was public recognition that certain established female Jewish leaders were serious candidates for the rabbinate if only they were permitted to be ordained. In 1938, Rabbi Arthur Lelyveld described Lily Montagu's 1930 tour of Jewish congregations in the United States and the general communal impression of Montagu as a "lady rabbi". Montagu was also noted by Rabbi Max Routtenberg of the Rabbinical Assembly as being one of the only women to regularly serve as spiritual leader to a Reform/Liberal congregation.

In other cases, newspaper reports would describe various Jewish women active in the community as "women rabbis". In 1935 (and later in 1946), Avis Clamitz was reported to have completed her studies and received ordination. However, according to later researchers, the HUC program granted Clamitz a Bachelor of Hebrew Letters in place of an ordination. Similarly, American Jewish coverage of the death of Sarah Horowitz of Częstochowa, Poland described her as "the world's only woman Chassidic rabbi" who had presumed leadership following the death of her husband. In 1939, Helen Levinthal (despite the denial of her ordination) was also described as a "woman rabbi" due to her completion of her studies, her public lectures, and her occasional opportunities to lead congregational services.

Other instances of women serving as a pulpit leader of an American Jewish community, without formal ordination, were Tehilla Lichtenstein (1893–1973) and Paula Ackerman (1893–1989). From 1938 to 1972, Lichtenstein led the Society of Jewish Science, a Jewish spiritual movement originally led by Rabbi Alfred G. Moses. Lichtenstein was referred to as the first American woman to lead a Jewish congregation. Ackerman was the wife of Rabbi William Ackerman, who had served the Reform Temple Beth Israel in Meridian, Mississippi. After her husband's death, Paula Ackerman accepted the role of acting rabbi from 1951 to 1953. At the start of this change, Ackerman received approval from Maurice Eisendrath, then president of the Union of American Hebrew Congregations. Although Eisendrath later withdrew his support, nevertheless, the congregation leadership upheld the appointment. Ackerman was dubbed "America's first Lady Rabbi".

==== 1960s-present ====
Beginning in the late 1960s and early 1970s, the efforts to shift the status quo on women gained momentum and institutional support. The National Federation of Temple Sisterhoods, led by Jane Evans, publicly campaigned for the recognition of women rabbis. By the mid-1960s, the Leo Baeck College in the United Kingdom accepted women into its rabbinical program. During this time, women were approved for ordination as rabbis within several Jewish denominations. The first such ordination took place in 1972 when Sally Priesand became the first female rabbi in Reform Judaism. Since then, Reform Judaism's Hebrew Union College has ordained hundreds of women. The second denomination to ordain a woman rabbi was Reconstructionist Judaism with the 1974 ordination of Sandy Eisenberg Sasso. Since then, over 100 Reconstructionist women have been ordained. Lynn Gottlieb becoming the first female rabbi in Jewish Renewal in 1981. In 1985, Amy Eilberg became the first female rabbi in Conservative Judaism. In 1999, Tamara Kolton became the first rabbi of any gender within Humanistic Judaism. In 2006, Dina Najman became the first Orthodox woman appointed as rabbinic leader of a synagogue. In 2009, there was controversy over the appointment of Sara Hurwitz as an Orthodox woman rabbi; the situation of women within Orthodoxy is still debated today (see below: § Orthodox Judaism).

In terms of women-led institutions of higher Jewish learning (yeshivot), the first appearance of such a program began with the efforts of Malka Bina in Israel. By the 2010s, there were forty such institutions with a collective student body of 3,000 women.

In 2018, Vered Hillel became the first woman to be ordained as a rabbi by the Messianic Jewish Rabbinical Council. (Note that Messianic Judaism considers itself to be a form of Judaism but is generally considered to be a form of Christianity.)

In 2025 the International Israelite Board of Rabbis voted to allow women to become rabbis, but it ruled that when women rabbis are considered ritually impure (for example during menstruation or after childbirth) others must do their religious duties.

There have been many other "firsts" for women rabbis relating to a variety of backgrounds and nationalities (see: Timeline of women rabbis).

=== Membership by denomination ===
Since the 1970s, over 1,200 women rabbis have been ordained across all Jewish denominational associations and institutions with the majority associated with American institutions:

- Reform Judaism – Over 700 women rabbis are associated with Reform and Progressive Judaism worldwide:
  - Central Conference of American Rabbis (CCAR) – as of 2016, 699 (32%) of the association's 2,176 member rabbi were women.
  - Israeli Council of Reform Rabbis (MARAM) – as of 2016, 18 (58%) of the 31 the association's rabbis officiating in congregations were women. Of the group's total membership at the time, 48 (48%) of 100 rabbis were women.
  - Progressive Judaism in Europe – as of 2006, the total number of women ordained at the Leo Baeck College was 30 (19%) out of all of the 158 ordinations completed at the institution since 1956.
  - Progressive Judaism in Australia includes 7 women (50%) out of the group's 14 practicing rabbis.
- Conservative Judaism – Around 300 women rabbis are associated with Conservative Judaism worldwide:
  - Rabbinical Assembly (USA) – as of 2010, 273 (17%) of the 1,648 members of the Rabbinical Assembly were women.
  - Conservative Judaism in Israel – as of 2016, 22 (14%) of the Israeli Masorati movement's 160 rabbi members were women.
- Orthodox Judaism – Around 87* women rabbis are associated with Orthodox Judaism worldwide:
  - Yeshivat Maharat (USA) – from 2013 to 2022, the "Open Orthodox" Yeshivat Maharat ordained 57 women rabbis, however, the titles Rabbi, Rabba, Maharat, Rabbanit, and Darshan are used interchangeably by the program's graduates.
  - Misc. (Israel) – private institutions in Israel have ordained 30 women rabbis, these include 6 women rabbis of a total 13 graduates from Beit Midrash Har'el;
- Reconstructionist Judaism – At least 50 women rabbis are associated with Reconstructionist Judaism worldwide:
  - Reconstructionist Rabbinical College (USA) – between 1973 and 1996, a total of 73 women (40%) were ordained as rabbis from a total of 184 ordinations during that time. By 2021, more than half of all affiliated Reconstructionist congregations are led or co-led by women rabbis.

==== Statistics by denominational association ====
- Overall figures — The following table summarizes the total number of women rabbis associated with a denominational institution or association (estimate dates range from the late 1990s to the late 2010s, see § Membership by denomination).

Denomination	Total
Reform / Liberal	777
Conservative / Masorti	295
Orthodox	87*
Reconstructionist	73*
Humanistic	Not published
Renewal	Not published
Total	1,232

- Regional figures — The following table summarizes the total number of women rabbis associated by denominational institution and rabbinic association, listed according to the location of the institution or association (estimate dates range from the late 1990s to the late 2010s, see § Membership by denomination).

Denomination	USA	Israel	Europe	Total	Rabbinical Institution / Association
Reform / Liberal	699	48	30	777	USA: Central Conference of American Rabbis; Israel: Israeli Council of Reform Rabbis; Europe: Leo Baeck College
Conservative / Masorti	273	22		295	USA: Rabbinical Assembly; Israel: Masorti Movement in Israel
Orthodox	57	30*		87*	USA: Yeshivat Maharat; Israel: Various
Reconstructionist	>73*			73	USA: Reconstructionist Rabbinical College
Humanistic				Not published	USA/Israel: International Institute for Secular Humanistic Judaism
Renewal				Not published	USA: ALEPH: Alliance for Jewish Renewal
Total	1,102	100	30	1,232	

== Development by denomination ==
=== Reform Judaism ===
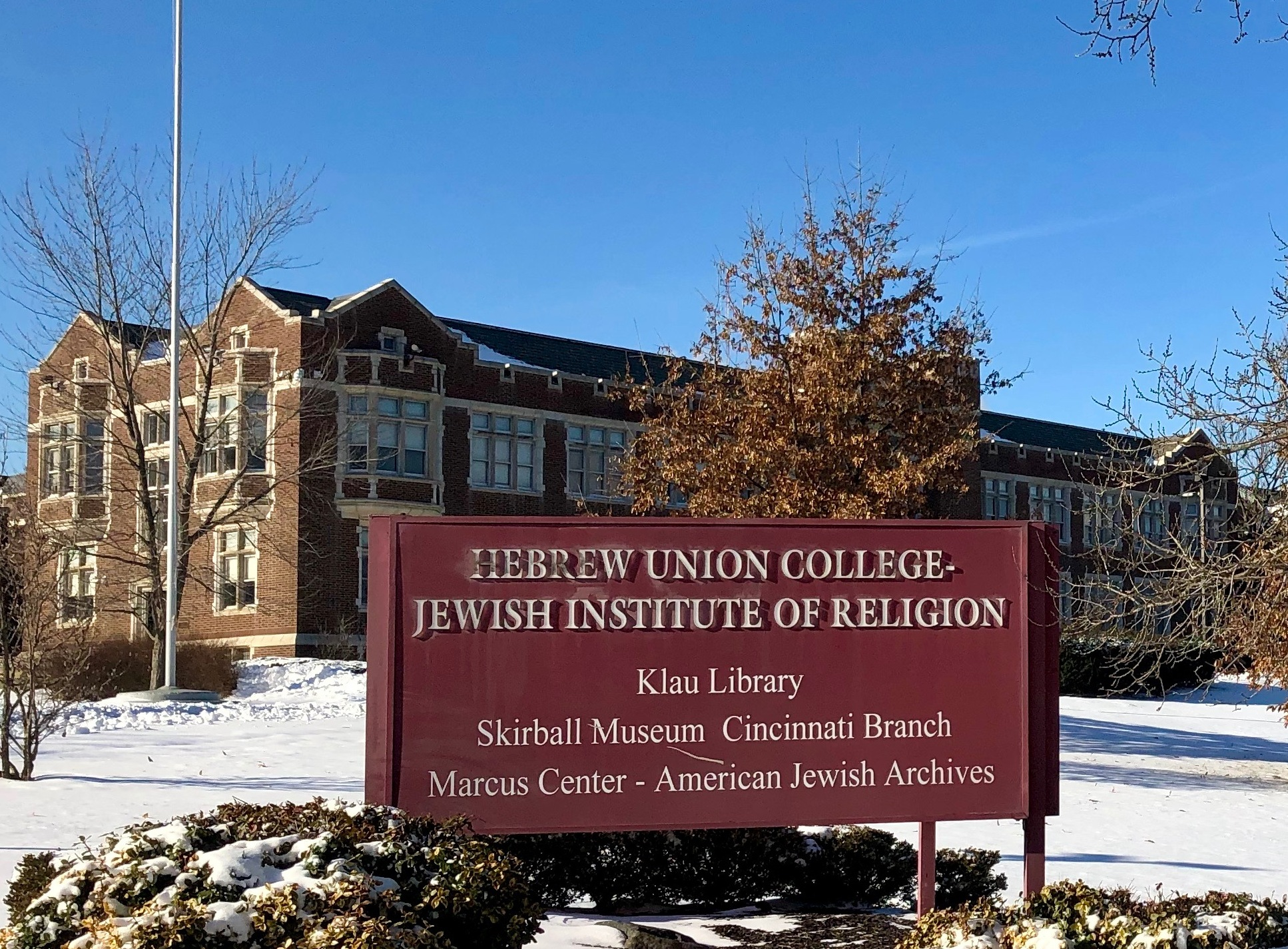
In 1972, the first denominational ordination took place at Hebrew Union College (Ohio)

Since its formation during the 19th century, Reform Judaism allowed men and women to pray together in synagogues. This Jewish ritual decision was based on the egalitarian philosophy of the movement. Subsequently, in 1922, the topic of women as rabbis was discussed formally by the Central Conference of American Rabbis (CCAR). In the end, the CCAR voted against the proposal. In 1950, Hebrew Union College (HUC) president, Rabbi Dr Nelson Glueck reportedly stated his willingness for the college to begin ordaining women as rabbis. In 1955, the Central Conference of American Rabbis (CCAR) reportedly rejected a proposal from HUC to ordain women rabbis but later agreed to conduct a year's study on the topic. In the late 1950s and early 1960s, activists within Reform Judaism publicly campaigned for the recognition of women rabbis. This effort was led in part by Jane Evans, the executive director of the National Federation of Temple Sisterhoods. In 1958, Evans reported that she and several other women had informally filled the role of rabbis upon the request of their congregations. With the topic raised again, eventual support for the change gave way to the 1972 ordination of Sally Priesand as the first female Reform rabbi. The Reform movements' eventual approval of female ordinations was not necessarily a result of changed ideologies among Reform religious leaders but due to the changed social climate of the late 1960s.

In 1982, ten years after the movement's first ordination of a woman rabbi, Rabbi Stanley Dreyfus, a prominent Reform rabbi, presented a report to the CCAR, outlining the extent of acceptance of women rabbis. Dreyfus found that initially, many congregations were reluctant to accept a woman officiant at Jewish funerals, or to for her to provide rabbinic counselling, or to lead prayer services. However, notwithstanding these initial qualms, Dreyfus found that a decade after the movement's acceptance of the ordination of women rabbis the Reform community had, in general, "fully accepted" the new reality.

Outside the United States, the history and presence of women rabbis in Liberal (Reform) Judaism varies:

- Europe — Prior to the formal ordination of European women rabbis, there was public recognition that Lily Montagu had essentially served as a rabbi without a title. In the mid-1960s, the Leo Baeck College announced it was accepting women into its rabbinical program. Since then, the Jewish community in the United Kingdom has maintained a growing number of women rabbis since the 1970s. The first British woman rabbi, Jacqueline Tabick, was ordained in 1975, three years after the first Reform women's ordination in the United States in 1972. By 1989, there were 10 women rabbis in Britain. By the 2000s, there were 30 women rabbis which represent half of the Progressive Rabbinate in the United Kingdom. By contrast, elsewhere in Europe, appointments of women rabbis occur infrequently. In France, in the 2010s, the Progressive Jewish community in Paris had just three women rabbis, Pauline Bebe, Delphine Horvilleur, and Floriane Chinsky. In Italy, the first woman rabbi was appointed in 2004. Poland's first woman rabbi was appointed in 2007. In terms of training women rabbis in European rabbinical schools, as of 2006, the number of women rabbis ordained through Leo Baeck College was 30.
- Israel — The first ordination of a woman rabbi in Israel occurred in 1992, twenty years after the first American ordination. The Israeli branch of the Reform movement's Hebrew Union College provided the ordination. However, the Israeli Reform movement faces structural challenges due to its lacking of state recognition and funding. Reform rabbis have no legal authority to conduct Jewish weddings, divorces, or burials. This situation has caused significant marginalization of Israeli Reform congregations. Nevertheless, according to the Israeli Council of Reform Rabbis (MARAM), as of 2016, there were 18 women rabbis officiating in Reform congregations in Israel. While the Israeli Reform movement (Yahadut Mitkademet) is situated in the Israeli context, its adoption of egalitarian policies indicate that it tends to follow the lead of American Reform Judaism.
- Australia — In the late 2010s, the Progressive Jewish community in Australia included seven practicing women rabbis. This figure represented half of the total 14 practicing Progressive rabbis in the country.

=== Conservative Judaism ===
In the late 1970s, following the decision within the denomination of Reform Judaism to accept women rabbis, the debate extended to Conservative Judaism. In 1979, the Faculty Senate of the Jewish Theological Seminary of America adopted a motion recognising that the topic had caused severe division among Conservative rabbis, and that the movement would not accept women rabbis. The motion was passed 25 to 19. The resistance to women's ordination was couched in the context of Jewish Law, however, the JTS resolution contains political and social considerations as well. During this same period, the Conservative movement appointed a special commission to study the issue of ordaining women as rabbis. The commission met between 1977 and 1978, and consisted of eleven men and three women. In 1983, the faculty of the Jewish Theological Seminary of America, voted, without accompanying opinion, to ordain women as rabbis and as cantors. In 1985, the status quo had formally changed with the movement's ordination of Amy Eilberg, admitting her as a member in the Rabbinical Assembly. After this step, the Conservative movement proceeded to admit Rabbis Jan Caryl Kaufman and Beverly Magidson who had been ordained at Reform movement's Hebrew Union College. Scholars observe that the inclusion of women rabbis within Conservative Judaism has had the effect of allowing greater inclusion for Neo-Hasidic practices within the movement. Opposition toward the ordination of women rabbis in the Conservative movement resulted in a group of members, organised as Union for Traditional Judaism, to split from Conservative Judaism and occupy a stance that was somewhat aligned with modern Orthodox Judaism.

- Israel — The Conservative movement in Israel (Masorti) has adopted egalitarian policies and has accepted women rabbis in congregational and organizational leadership roles, however, while they generally follow the lead of Conservative Judaism in North America, on gender issues the Masorti movement has taken a more traditionalist stance. The first Conservative ordination of a woman rabbi in Israel occurred in 1993, one year after the first such Israeli Reform ordination.

=== Orthodox Judaism ===
The status of women rabbis in contemporary Orthodox Judaism began to change in the mid-1990s and early 2000s. Theoretically, even within the Orthodox framework, the complex problem of women in the rabbinate may be dealt with by separating the various aspects of the role of the rabbi and to treat each matter separately, leaving aspects of the role open and others closed. Positions and views on the matter vary by subgroup within Orthodoxy. Additionally, there are regional differences on the acceptance of the change. Notwithstanding the developments that have taken place, the subject is still a contested matter within Orthodox Judaism.

Early cases of the ordination of women within Orthodox Judaism occurred without public knowledge, without a formal title, or for a woman serving a non-Orthodox congregation. Mimi Feigelson, a student of Rabbi Shlomo Carlebach was reportedly ordained in 1994 by a panel of three rabbis, after Carlebach's death, and kept secret until 2000. Also in 2000, Orthodox rabbi Jonathan Chipman ordained Eveline Goodman-Thau in Jerusalem. Goodman-Thau later went on to serve as the first female rabbi in Austria for a liberal congregation. In 2006, Dina Najman was ordained by Rabbi Daniel Sperber and was appointed to perform rabbinic functions for Kehilat Orach Eliezer in Manhattan, New York, using the title of "rosh kehilah," not "rabbi." Similarly, in 2006, Haviva Ner-David was privately ordained by Rabbi Aryeh Strikovsky in Israel. In 2009, the status quo was further altered with the public ordination of Sara Hurwitz. Hurwitz was ordained by Rabbis Avi Weiss and Daniel Sperber. Although Weiss headed the rabbinical school Yeshivat Chovevei Torah, Hurwitz was trained at Drisha, an all-women's institute. Other key elements to Hurwitz's ordination was Weiss's formally founding of Yeshivat Maharat as a new rabbinical institution for the purpose of training Orthodox women as clergy which would be headed by Hurwitz. Additionally, Weiss, Sperber and other rabbis issued rabbinic responsa concerning women's ordination within Orthodoxy. Hurwitz's rabbinic title was initially "maharat", an acronym of manhiga hilkhatit rukhanit Toranit, (authority of Jewish law and spirituality). Hurwitz later came to use the title "Rabba". Hurwitz is the first woman rabbi in American Orthodox Judaism and is thus often described as the first Orthodox woman rabbi.

- North America — Orthodox Judaism in North America is the site where significant changes in relation to women's ordination have occurred, however, major North American Orthodox institutions, including the Orthodox Union, the Rabbinical Council of America, and Agudath Israel of America do not recognize women rabbis and deem the change as violating rabbinic tradition. Orthodox rabbinic opposition is not singular in nature and the rabbinical organisations invoke both Jewish legalism (halacha) as well as rabbinic tradition (mesorah) to maintain their position. Additionally, the invocation of rabbinic tradition which is understood as a "meta-legal" (meta-halachik) concern has become more prominent than the religious legal concern. However, the nature of the meta-legal argument is viewed as a uniquely modern argument developed by Orthodox rabbis to counter social pressures of the modern period. Similarly, scholars point out that the opposition of the Rabbinical Council of America is not explicitly based on Jewish law but on an opposition to the changing of norms in modernity. Many people within the Orthodox community feel that the idea that women should become rabbis comes from the idea and need that modern times bring that women must suddenly fulfill all roles that men traditionally used to. This pressure comes from outside the community, not from within, and so, it is a foreign desire that goes against the values of the community. The historical context for the opposition followed the changes adopted by the Reform and Conservative denominations in the 1970s and 1980s, when the question of women rabbis within Orthodox Judaism in North America also became subject to debate. Calls for Orthodox yeshivas to admit women as rabbinical students were initially met with total opposition. Rabbi Norman Lamm, one of the leaders of Modern Orthodoxy and Rosh Yeshiva of Rabbi Isaac Elchanan Theological Seminary (RIETS), opposed ordaining women, arguing it would negatively disrupt the Orthodox tradition. Other Orthodox rabbis criticized the request as contrary to Jewish Law, viewing Orthodox Judaism as specifically prohibiting women from receiving ordination and serving as rabbis. In 2009, Rabbi Avi Weiss ordained Sara Hurwitz with the title "maharat" as an alternate title to "rabbi". Since Hurwitz's ordination, and Weiss' founding of Yeshivat Maharat as a formal institution to provide ordination, the number of Orthodox women rabbis has grown; however, not all use the title of "rabbi" and instead use other variations such as "rabba", "rabbanit", maharat", and "darshanit". In North America, the Orthodox Union, a central rabbinic organization of modern Orthodox Judaism has taken the position that it will not admit any synagogue as a new member organization if the synagogue employs women as clergy. However, four synagogues have been exempt from this ban as they are long-standing members of the Orthodox Union. The opposition from the major rabbinic associations thas restricted Orthodox women rabbinical candidates and graduates to a few select institutions. Countering the position of the Rabbinical Council of America, the International Rabbinic Fellowship, a collective of Orthodox rabbis, have affirmed a position to accept women in clerical roles and advocates for the phenomenon of women as rabbis to develop naturally among Orthodox Jews. While Orthodox rabbinic associations are divided over the acceptance and the extent of opposition to women rabbis, the main Orthodox feminist group in North America, the Jewish Orthodox Feminist Alliance (JOFA), is in support of the change.
- Israel — In Israel, the position of modern Orthodox rabbis has changed over the 2010s. In the 2010s, a few Israeli Orthodox institutions began ordaining women. Beit Midrash Har'el, a modern-Orthodox institution based in Jerusalem ordained a cohort Orthodox men and women. Additionally, several Orthodox women have been ordained as part of a pluralistic ordination program run by the Shalom Hartman Institute in partnership with HaMidrasha at Oranim. The program, known as "The Beit Midrash for Israeli Rabbis," ordained its first class in 2016 and is continuing to train additional classes of non-denominational rabbis. In 2013, the founder of Tzohar, a major Orthodox rabbinic association based in Israel, reportedly left the possibility of women's ordination as an open-ended issue to be determined in the future. Additionally, the main Orthodox feminist group in Israel, Kolech, is in support of the change. In 2021, Shira Marili Mirvis of Efrat became the first Orthodox woman to lead a religious congregation. Support for Orthodox women as auxiliary clergy, under the title of Advisors of Jewish Law (Yoatzot Halacha), have gained popular and governmental support. In June 2022, the Israeli Minister for Religious Affairs, Matan Kahana, announced changes to religious council funding which would allow yoatzot to be formally paid for religious services.
- Other — In 2018, Dina Brawer, founder of JOFA UK, became the first UK Orthodox woman to be ordained. In Australia, the first Orthodox women to be ordained were Ellyse Borghi from Melbourne who received Smicha from Har'el in 2019, and Rabbanit Judith Levitan from Sydney who received her ordination through Yeshivat Maharat. Levitan is a practicing legal aid lawyer and a founding member of the Jewish Alliance Against Domestic Violence. Levitan is active in an Orthodox synagogue in Maroubra, New South Wales. The Orthodox Beth Din of Sydney reportedly applauded Levitan's commitment to Orthodoxy but reiterated that the issue of Orthodox ordination for women was still a matter of controversy. In 2022, Levitan was appointed as the first female rabbi to serve as a chaplain in the Australian Defence Force.

==== Alternate Orthodox approaches ====
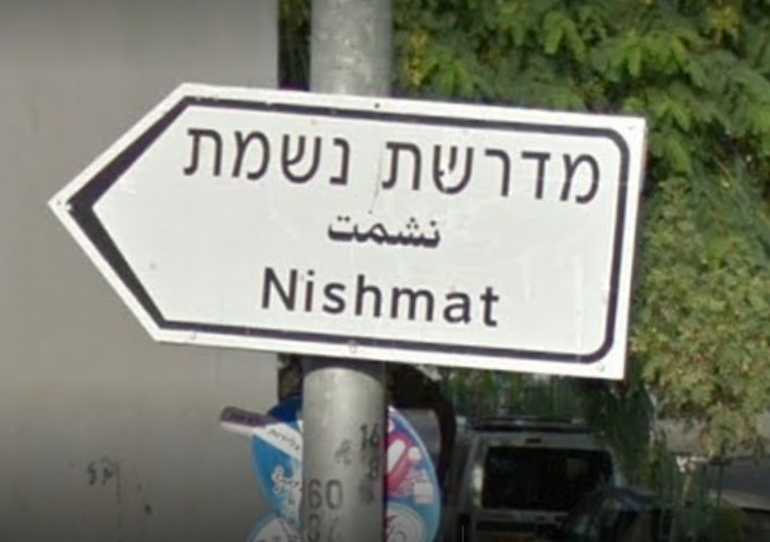
Nishmat – Women's Midrasha in Jerusalem

Alongside this debate, a third approach within Orthodoxy has developed. Individual Orthodox institutions have accepted women in alternate roles relating to Jewish law such as halakhic advisors (Yoatzot), court advocates (Toanot) and congregational advisors. Examples of this trend gaining acceptance include the efforts of Rabbi Aryeh Strikovski of Machanaim Yeshiva and Pardes Institute who collaborated with Rabbi Avraham Shapira, former Chief Rabbi of Israel, to initiate a program for training Orthodox women as halakhic Toanot ("advocates") in rabbinic courts. Since then, seventy Israeli women were trained as Toanot. In England, in 2012, Rabbi Ephraim Mirvis, the country's chief rabbi, appointed Lauren Levin as Britain's first Orthodox female halakhic adviser, at Finchley United Synagogue in London. This distinction of women rabbis are ordained to rule on matters of Jewish law versus women as Torah scholars who may provide instruction in Jewish law is found in Jewish legal works. Yet, despite this alteration in title, these women are often perceived as equivalent to ordained rabbis.

In Israel a growing number of Orthodox women are being trained as Yoetzet Halacha (halakhic advisers), and the use of Toanot is not restricted to any one segment of Orthodoxy; In Israel they have worked with Haredi and Modern Orthodox Jews. Orthodox women may study the laws of family purity at the same level of detail that Orthodox males do at Nishmat, the Jerusalem Center for Advanced Jewish Study for Women. The purpose is for them to be able to act as halakhic advisors for other women, a role that traditionally was limited to male rabbis. This course of study is overseen by Rabbi Yaakov Varhaftig.

Since the 2010s, the Israeli-based modern Orthodox institution Ohr Torah Stone began training and certifying Orthodox women as "Morat Hora’ah U’Manhigah Ruchanit" (or "Morat Hora’ah") as teachers who are authorized to provide direction in matters of Jewish law. It is a position that is not formally listed as rabbinical ordination, but may be understood as a role that overlaps with the role of "rabbi". These certifications are obtained by study at seminaries such as Midreshet Lindenbaum and its "Women's Institute of "Halakhic Leadership"; Without granting ordination, two other programs mirror the Rabbinate's ordination requirements for men include Ein HaNetziv, which trains students as "Teachers of Halacha"; and Matan, for recognition as "meshivot halacha" or halakhic respondents.

Support for women as Torah scholars is a cause backed by several Orthodox women's organizations. The Orthodox women's organization Kolech has supported the recognition of women as Torah scholars. In 2016, Kolech launched an initiative called "Shabbat Dorshot Tov" which promoted women speakers and scholars in residence in dozens of Orthodox synagogues across Israel. The project was formed in collaboration with Midreshet Lindenbaum, Matan Women's Institute for Torah Studies, Midreshet Ein HaNetziv, and the Beit Hillel association. In 2018, the Hadran organization was founded to support Jewish women studying Talmud. In 2020, the organization hosted the first women's celebration marking the completion of the traditional seven-year cycle of Talmud study, an event which was attended by over 3,000 Jewish women. While the rise of women Torah scholars is noted in individual Orthodox communities, there is no consensus on which title such women should receive. One approach found in the Sephardi and Mizrahi communities in Israel is to describe the public Torah study lectures offered by women as "speeches" and such events often accompany statements that these women have received support from community rabbis to conduct such speeches. Another approach for women Torah scholars has been to write and publish Jewish legal writings without overt challenges to male Orthodox rabbis.

=== Other denominations and movements ===
Hadar, an egalitarian Yeshiva which in previous years organized programs that facilitated Jewish women's advanced Torah study, offers a rabbinical program that is comparable to Orthodox rabbinical programs. In 2023, Yeshivat Hadar's first graduating class of ordained rabbis include a dozen graduates, half of whom are women.

In 2018 Vered Hillel became the first woman to be ordained as a rabbi by the Messianic Jewish Rabbinical Council; Messianic Judaism considers itself to be a form of Judaism but is generally considered to be a form of Christianity.)

In 2025 the International Israelite Board of Rabbis voted to allow women to become rabbis, but it ruled that when women rabbis are considered ritually impure (for example during menstruation or after childbirth) others must do their religious duties.

== Hebrew terminology ==
While the English term rabbi is used for women receiving rabbinical ordination, Hebrew grammatical parallels to the title may include rabba (רבה) – feminine parallel to rav (רב) – or rabbanit (רבנית). The term rabbanit (plural: rabbiniyot) is used by individual Orthodox women in this role. For example, Sara Hurwitz, who is considered the first Orthodox woman rabbi, was initially ordained with the title maharat (a Hebrew acronym that includes the title rabbanit) but subsequently began using the title rabba.

In Israel, a meshivat halacha ("responder of Jewish law") refers to a woman trained in Jewish law and who provides guidance and legal responses to community members.

== Cultural depictions ==
=== Literature ===
The inclusion of women rabbis as literary figures appears in American Jewish writings from at least the 1980s and 1990s. These include the following portrayals:

- So Help Me God! (1979) by Herbert Tarr — This novel, published seven years after the 1972 ordination of Sally Priesand includes a rabbinical student Isaca Zion. Zion is an important figure, but is not portrayed as the protagonist. By the end of the novel, Zion receives ordination. It is thought that Zion is the first fictional woman rabbi in contemporary American fiction.
- A Place of Light (1983) by Rhonda Shapiro-Rieser – This novel features several chapters on a Reform woman rabbi's career struggles in wake of the retirement of the senior male rabbi.
- The Unorthodox Murder of Rabbi Wahl (1987) by Joseph Telushkin — The title character of Telushkin's book is "Rabbi Myra Wahl" who is hated by her male colleagues and is killed off early in the narrative.
- The Rabbi Is a Lady (1987) by Alex J. Goldman – This novel portrays the widow of a conservative rabbi who is appointed to her late husband's pulpit and is likely inspired by the real life account of Paula Ackerman.
- The Rabbi in the Attic and Other Stories (1991) by Eileen Pollack — Pollack's work features an Old-World male rabbi and his leftist female successor.
- They Called Her Rebbe: The Maiden of Ludomir (1991) by Gershon Winkler — This historical novel details the life a Hasidic female leader.
- Acts of Faith (1992) by Erich Segal — This novel features the story of the son and daughter of the "Silczer Rebbe" who both become rabbis. While the son attempts to become the new Rebbe, the daughter ends up receiving ordination as a Reform rabbi.
- Woman of the Cloth (1998) by Roger Herst – This work offers a problematic story that includes a sleuth-like assistant Rabbi Gabrielle Lewyn who succeeds in convincing the congregation to forgive the senior rabbi's various affairs with different women.
- The Autobiography of God (2004) by Julius Lester — In Lester's novel, the rabbi-heroine grapples with Jewish theology, the novel also contains a murder mystery element.
- Joy Comes in the Morning (2004) by Jonathan Rosen — In this work, the protagonist, Rabbi Deborah Green, struggles with the perceptions of women rabbis.

Other depictions of women rabbis occur in other works. At times, these portrayals appear realistic such as in Marcia R. Rudin's Hear My Voice (2017), while others stretch the bounds of the plausible such as in Seth B. Goldberg's The Rabbi of Resurrection Bay (2015).

=== Television and film ===
Women rabbis appear in various television shows including:

- Six Feet Under (2001–2005) — In the show, Molly Parker plays the role of Rabbi Ari in two 2002 episodes, "Back to the Garden", "The Liar and the Whore".
- Transparent (2014–2017) — In the show and subsequent 2019 film, Kathryn Hahn plays the role of Rabbi Raquel Fein. Fein is a notable character in the series, depicted in ways that relate to the real life experiences of women rabbis in their occupation, as with Fein's writing a sermon for Passover while walking in the woods.
- Crazy Ex-Girlfriend (2015–2019) — In the show, Patti Lupone plays the role of a rabbi offering advice to Rebbeca, the show's protagonist.
- And Just Like That... (2021–) — Guest star Hari Nef plays Rabbi Jen in a 2022 episode "Seeing the Light".

Movies with women rabbi characters include:

- You Are So Not Invited to My Bat Mitzvah (2023) — Actress and comedian Sarah Sherman plays the role of Rabbi Rebecca who serves as a spiritual guide to the movie's protagonist, Stacy Friedman (played by Sunny Sandler).

Documentaries on women rabbis include:

- Not a Job for a Nice Jewish Girl (1994) — Directed by Jacquelynne Willcox, the film follows Rabbi Jacqueline Ninio, the third woman rabbi in Australia.
- My Rabbi (2005) — Directed by Leslie Krongold, the film tracks six women rabbis through personal struggles and triumphs.
- Regina: The First Woman Rabbi (2013) — Directed by Diana Groó, received several Jewish Film Festival awards for its portrayal of Regina Jonas, played by the actress Rachel Weisz.
- Kol Ishah: The Rabbi Is a Woman (2014) — Directed by Hannah Heer. The film features Rabbi Chava Koster, the first woman from the Netherlands to be ordained as a rabbi, and German-born Rabbi Elisa Klapheck who is the first woman rabbi to serve in the Netherlands.

== Gallery ==
Early news clippings reporting on prospective women rabbis
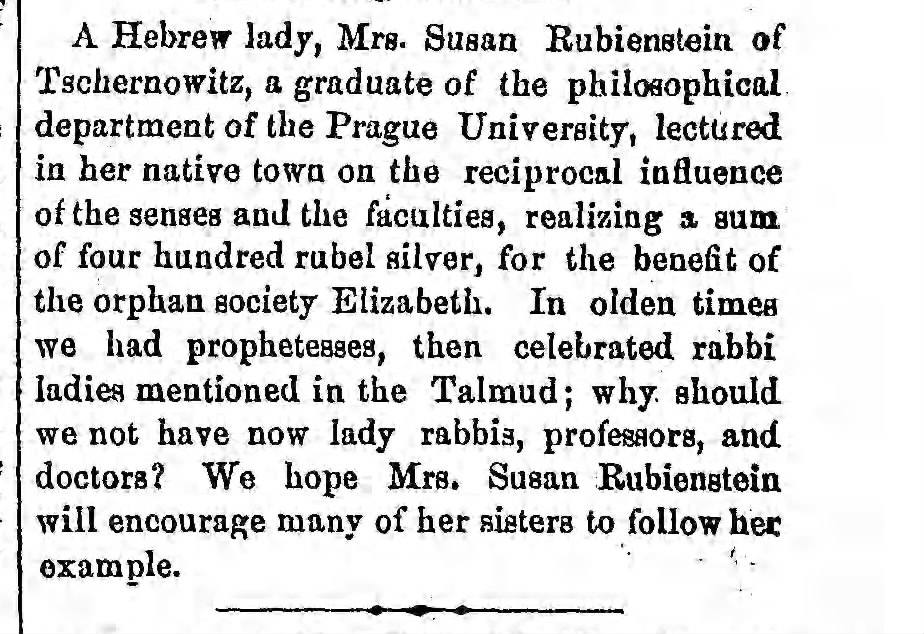
1871 report on Susanna Rubinstein as indication of the possibility of women rabbis (The American Israelite, 19 May 1871)

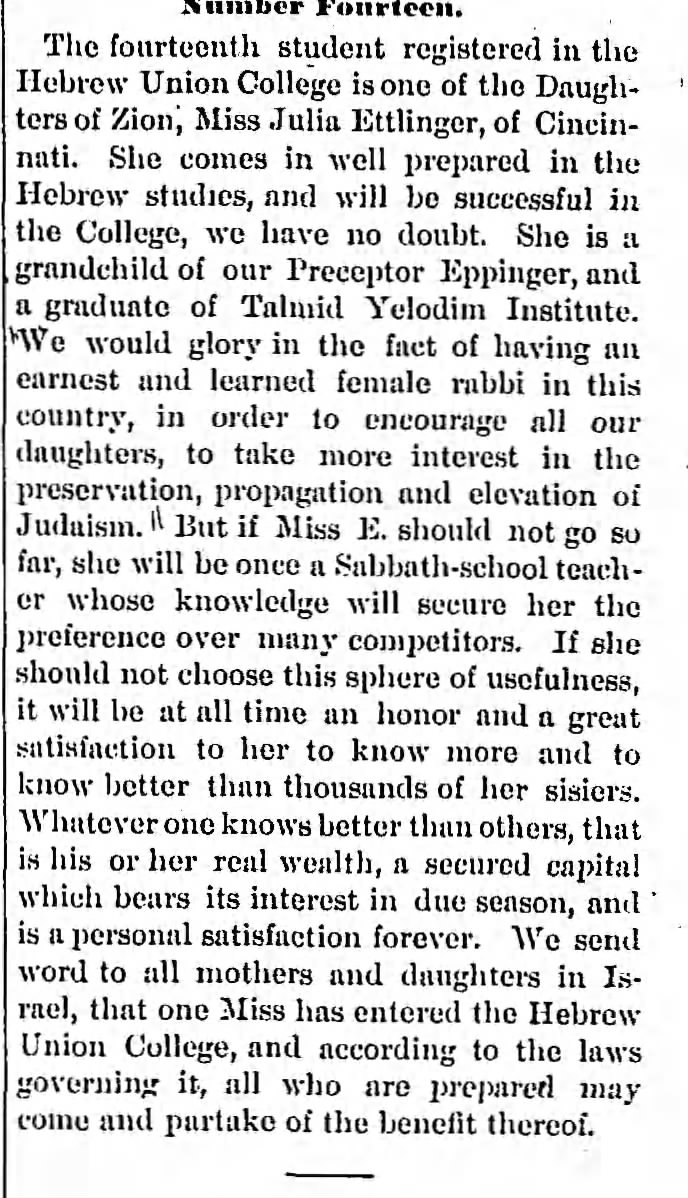
1875 article describing Julia Ettlinger, female student at Hebrew Union College, as a potential female rabbi (The American Israelite, 29 October 1875)

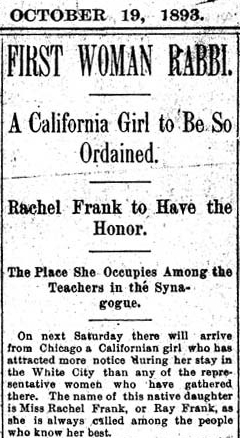
1893 article describing Ray Frank as the "first woman rabbi" (San Francisco Chronicle, 19 October 1893)

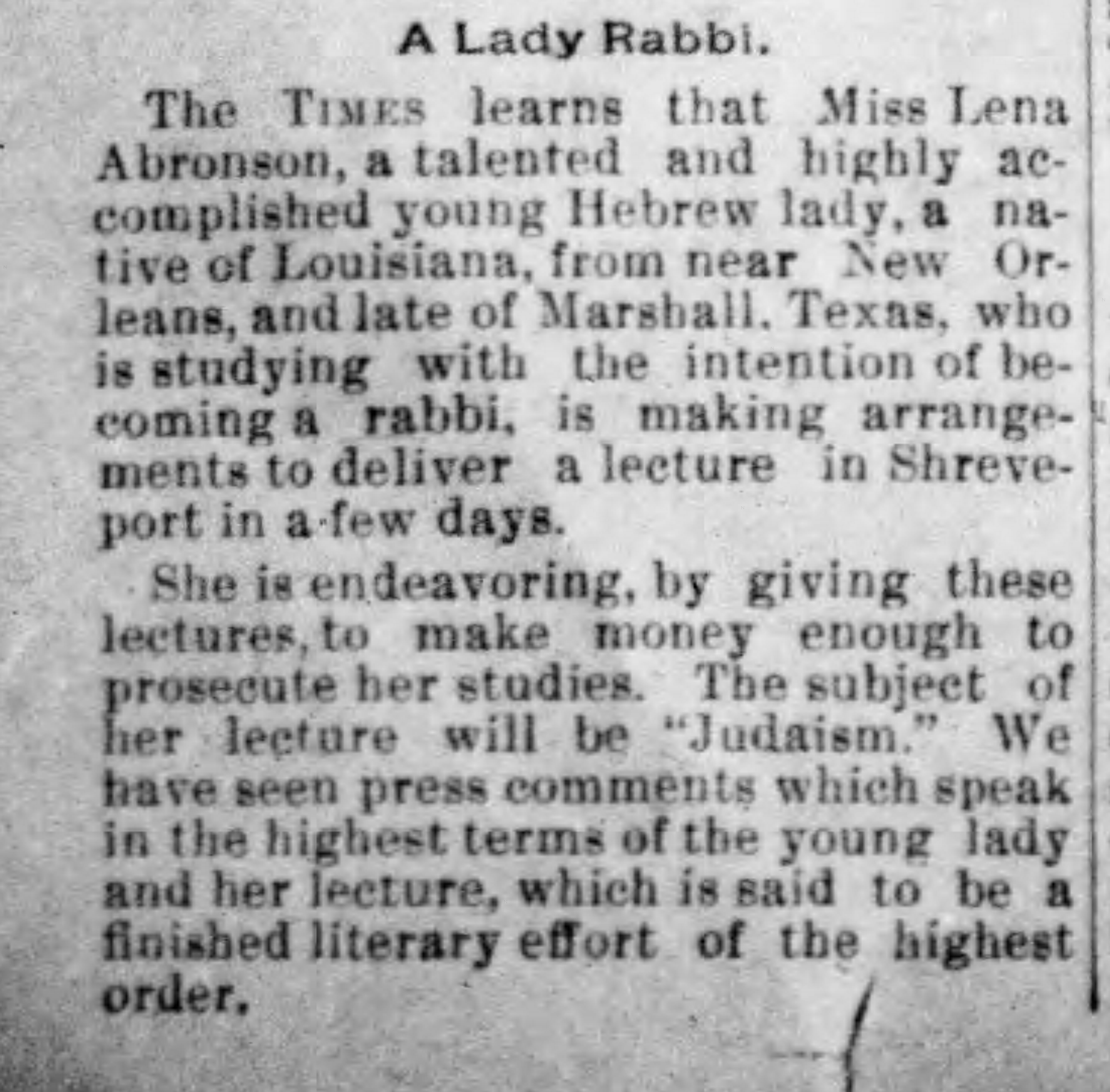
1893 report of a young woman (Lena Aronsohn) in Louisiana set to become "a lady rabbi" (Shreveport Times, 7 July 1893)

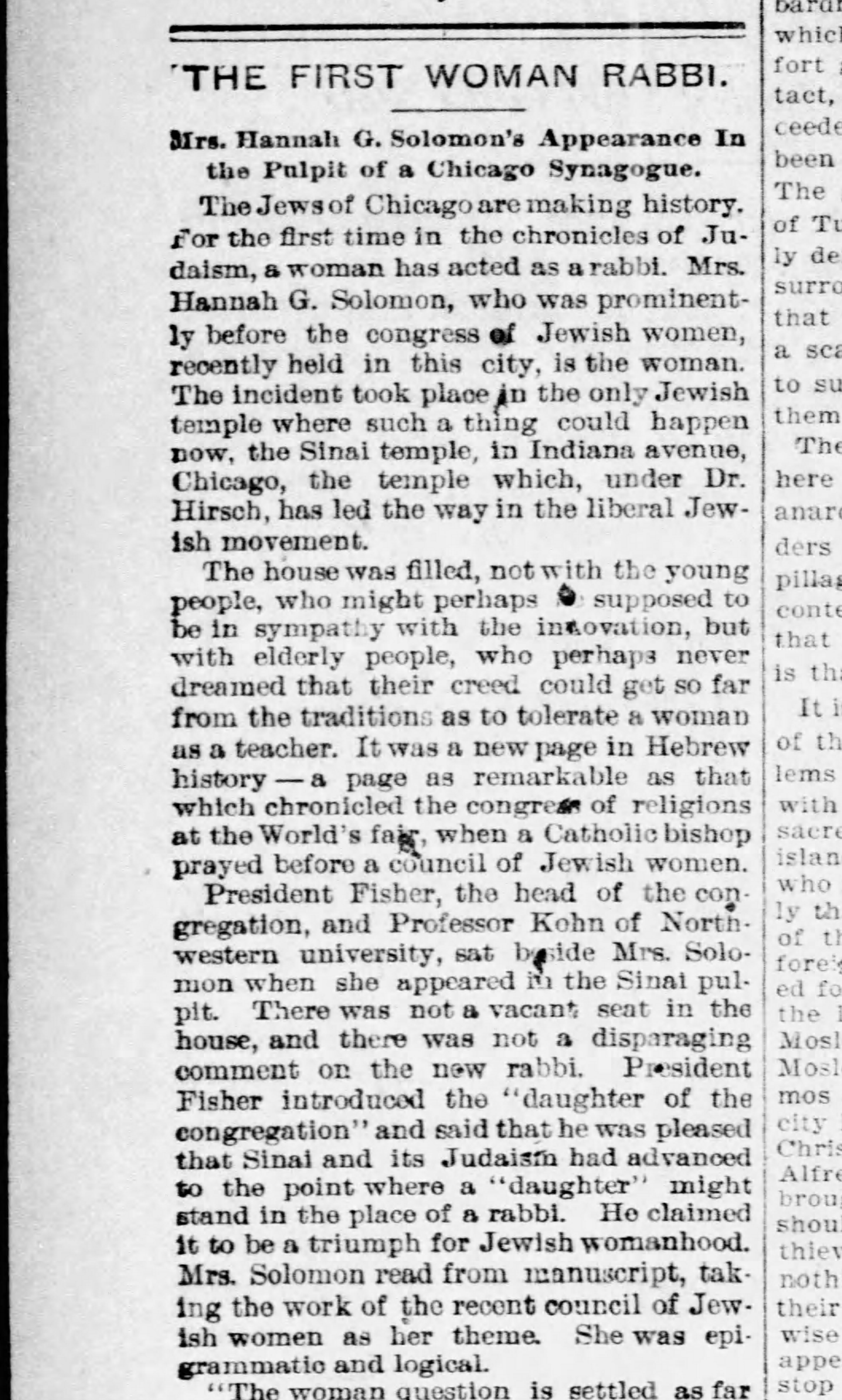
1897 article describing Hannah G. Solomon as the "first woman rabbi" (The Burlington Free Press, 16 March 1897)

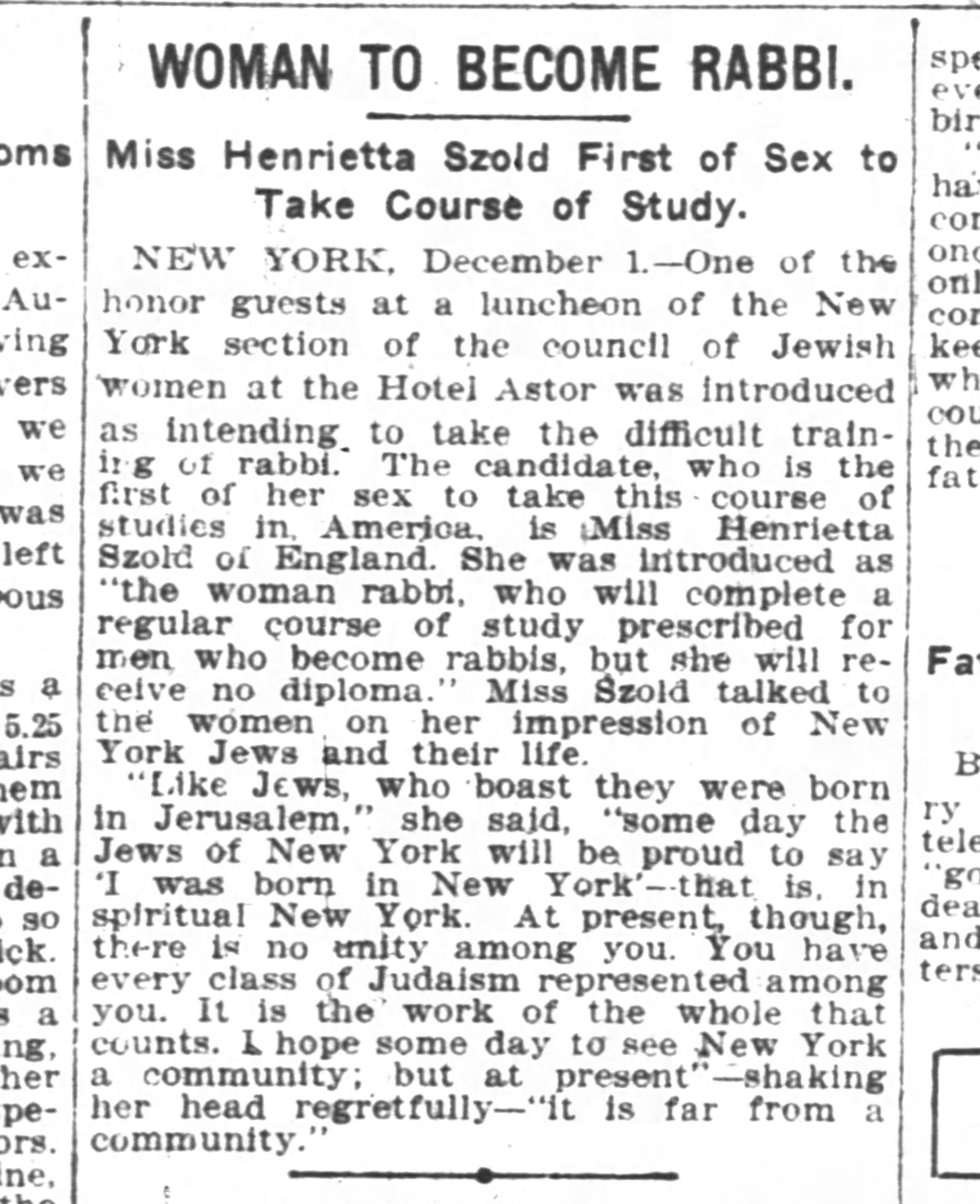
1904 article reporting Henrietta Szold's intention to pursue rabbinical studies without ordination (The Indianapolis News, 1 December 1904)

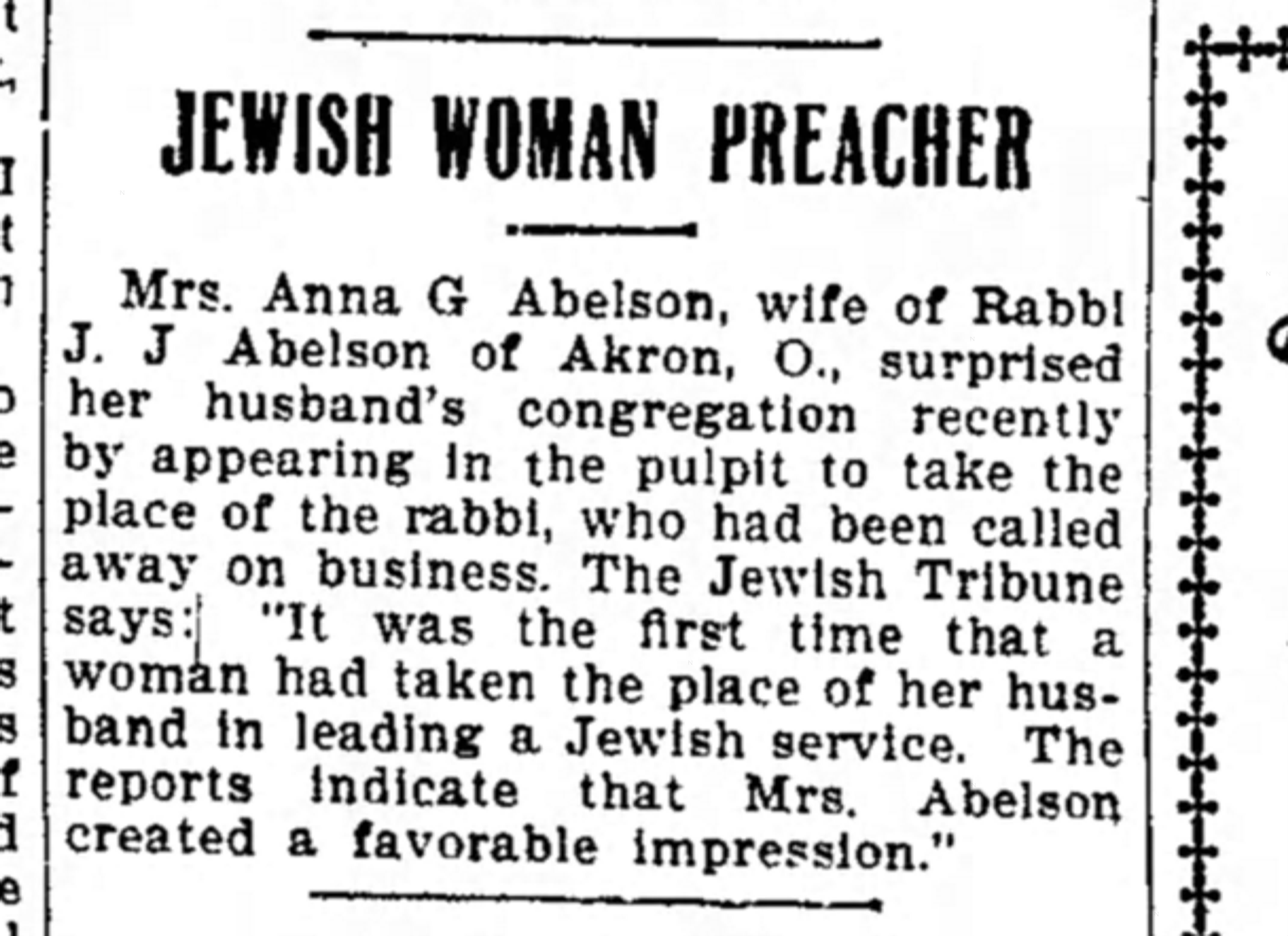
1908 article describing how Anna Abelson assumed the role of rabbi in her husband's absence (Trenton Evening Times, 1 August 1908)

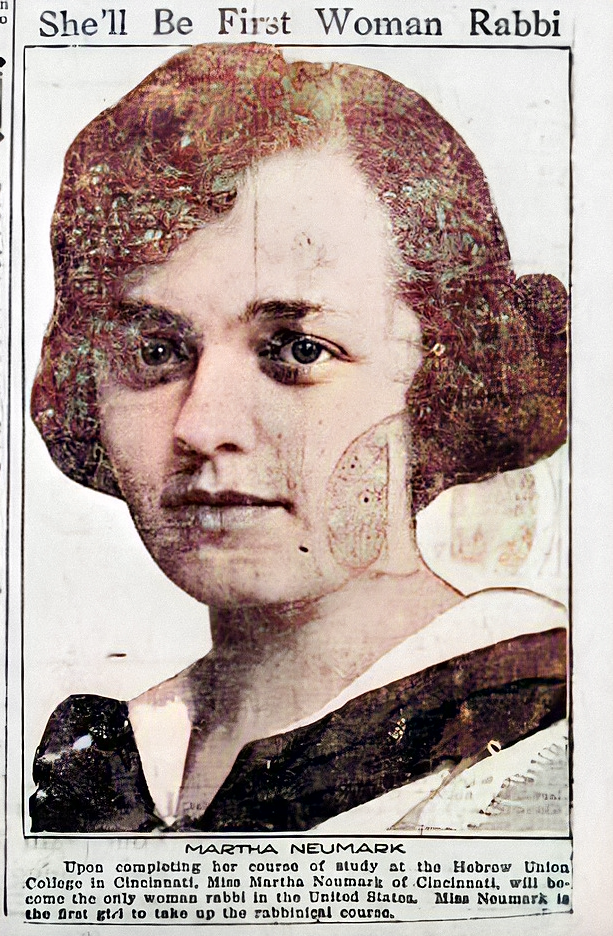
1920 article reporting Martha Neumark as the first American female rabbinical student (Lawrence Daily Journal-World, 25 December 1920)

== See also ==
- Rebbetzin
- Ordination of women
- Timeline of women rabbis
- Women as Imams
- Women in Judaism
