= Helen Levinthal =

Pioneering rabbinical school student (1910–1989)

Helen Levinthal (1910–1989) was a significant figure in the early history of the acceptance of Jewish women in the rabbinate.

== Overview ==
Helen Levinthal was the daughter of Israel H. Levinthal, an eminent New York rabbi, and had a significant Jewish education. In 1939 she became the first American woman to complete the entire course of study in a rabbinical school, which she did at the Jewish Institute of Religion in New York. Her thesis was on women's suffrage from the point of view of Jewish law. However, she only received a Master of Hebrew Letters (and a certificate recognizing her accomplishment) upon graduation, rather than a Master of Hebrew Letters and ordination as the men received, since the faculty felt it was not yet time for women's ordination as rabbis.

In March 1939, before her graduation, her father invited her to preach in his synagogue, which she did on the topic of "The Jewish Woman Faces a New World". She also spoke that year to a crowd of 900 at the Shaarel Zion Community Auditorium on the topic of "The Future of Judaism". In 1940 she preached at the High Holidays in Congregation B'nai Shalom in Brooklyn, as was noted in Time magazine. Shortly afterwards, she became one of three women, the others being Judith Kaplan and Avis Shulman, chosen by the Jewish Center Lecture Bureau to lecture throughout the country on Jewish subjects.

In 1988 the Hebrew Union College-Jewish Institute of Religion presented her with a "special certificate of recognition". She died of a brain tumor in 1989. Her obituary in The New York Times called her "a pioneer in Jewish education for women".

In 1991 the Helen Levinthal Lyons Memorial Scholarship was established in her honor at the New Rochelle Campership Fund, by her former husband Lester Lyons.

== See also ==
- Martha Neumark
- Irma Lindheim
