= Martha Neumark =

Early American female rabbinical student

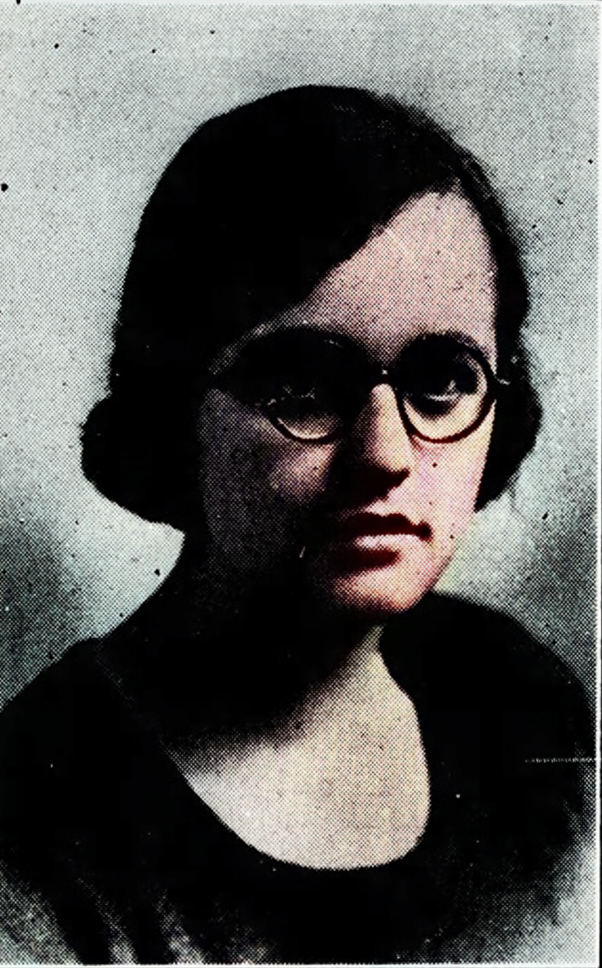
Martha Neumark in 1920

Martha Neumark (1904–1981) was a notable early figure in the history of women's ordination as rabbis. Neumark was widely reported to be the first Jewish woman to be accepted into a rabbinical school.

== Biography ==
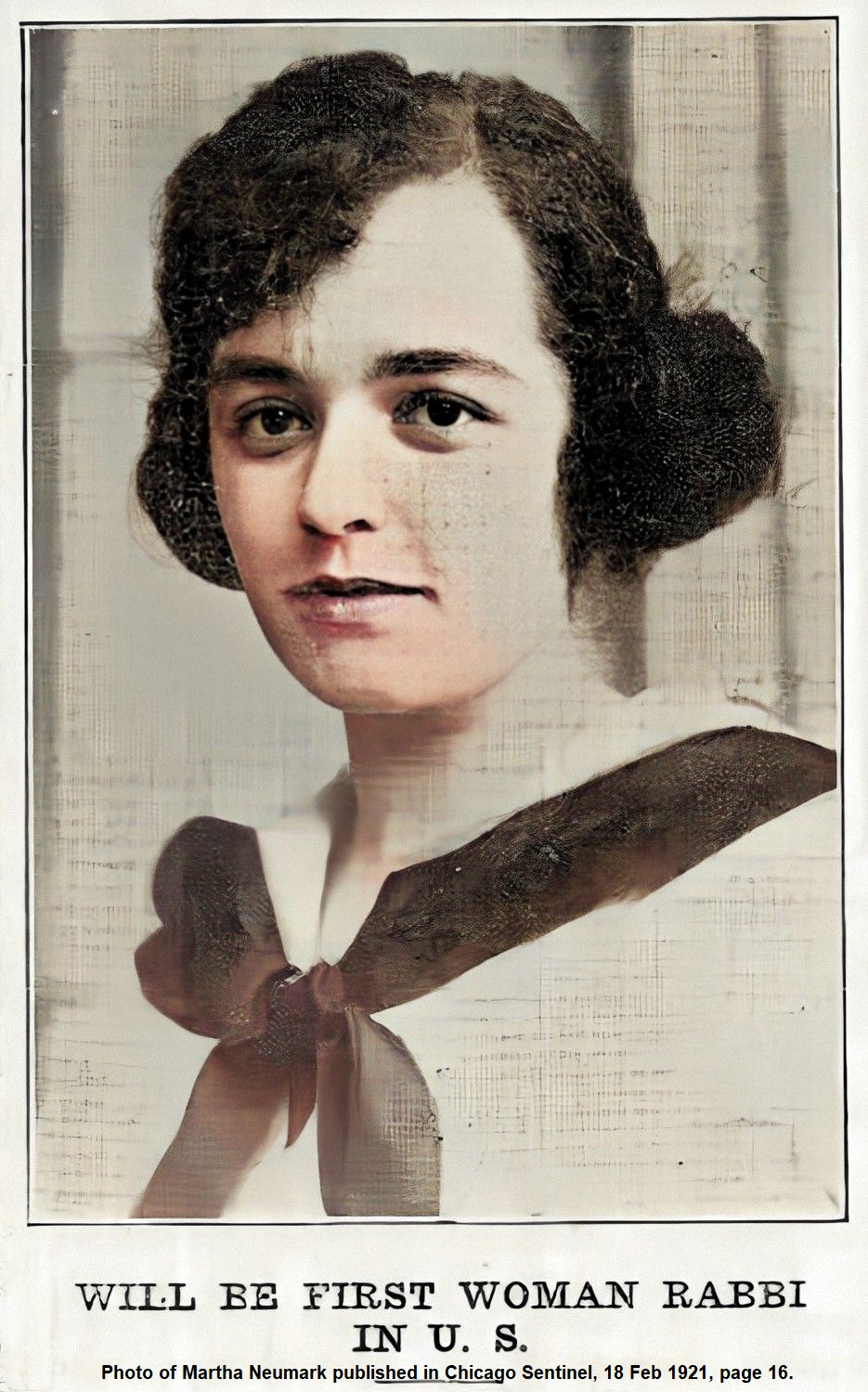
Photo of Martha Neumark published in Chicago Sentinel

Martha Neumark was the daughter of a professor at Hebrew Union College of Reform Judaism. In 1921, Neumark became the first female student at Hebrew Union College to declare her desire to become a rabbi. That year she requested a High Holiday pulpit for the next year, just as her male classmates would receive. The president of the college told its board of governors that it made sense that if she did preach and complete the required courses, she should be ordained; this touched off a debate on women's ordination, as no woman had ever been ordained as a rabbi.

The faculty approved her preaching if the congregation in question did not object, but later forbid it as she failed one of her courses. However, the debate on women's ordination she had sparked continued. In 1922 Neumark and her father attended the Central Conference of American Rabbis Conference, where she succeeded in convincing the CCAR to ordain women rabbis. The CCAR declared in a responsa in 1922, "...woman cannot justly be denied the privilege of ordination," having voted 56 to 11 in favor of that statement. Yet the board of the college still refused to consider women for ordination, voting (as Neumark recalled) six laymen to two rabbis against it. Neumark thus earned a qualification as a religious school principal instead of ordination, though she had spent 7 and a half years in rabbinical school.

In 1925 Martha's article "The Woman Rabbi: An Autobiographical Sketch of the First Woman Rabbinical Candidate" was published in the Jewish Tribune and Hebrew Standard.

Some of her personal papers are now held in the Jacob Rader Marcus Center of the American Jewish Archives at Hebrew Union College.

Following Neumark, instances of American Jewish women who studied for rabbinical ordination but were denied formal ordination include Helen Levinthal. Levinthal was denied ordination after completing her studies in 1935.

=== Independent Jewish Press Service ===
In the early 1940s, Neumark served as the executive editor of the Independent Jewish Press Service.

== Personal life ==
Martha Neumark married Henry Montor in 1924. The couple divorced in 1956. Neumark died in 1981 at the age of 77.

Neumark's parents were Rabbi Dr David Neumark (1866–1924), professor at Hebrew Union College and Mrs Dora Neumark (d. 1959). Her siblings were Salomea Brainin and Immanuel K. Neumark.

== See also ==
- Regina Jonas
- Ray Frank
- Lena Aronsohn
