= Toanot Rabniyot =

Women advocates in Jewish courts of law

Toanot Rabbaniyot, or Toanot (Hebrew: טוענות רבניות, "Women Rabbinical Advocates"), refer to women who serve as legal advocates and representatives within the traditional Jewish courts of law. Toanot typically argue cases on behalf of female claimants in the areas of divorce law. The tendency for women to receive unfair divorce settlements in Israeli rabbinical courts prompted the introduction of the Women Rabbinical Advocates. The innovation of Toanot has allowed women to practice Halachic expertise in a role that does not require rabbinical ordination.

== Development ==
In the early 1990s, Open Orthodox Rabbi Shlomo Riskin issued a challenge in Israel's High Court to the laws that prevented women from serving as advocates in the rabbinical court. The ruling was made in Riskin's favor and subsequently, Riskin established the first program for the training of women advocates in the religious courts. Graduates of the program are trained in Jewish law (Halacha) pertaining to women's rights in marriage and divorce proceedings. Their primary role is to defend the rights of women whose husbands refuse to grant them a divorce (agunot) in religious court proceedings, helping them to secure a religious divorce (get).

Supporters of the change argue that the introduction of women advocates have helped rabbinical rulings to be more impartial, and not favor men over women.

== See also ==
- Yoetzet Halacha
- Women Torah scholars
