= Fioretta of Modena =

Scholar of Jewish religious works

Fioretta Modena or Batsheva Modena (1522–1580) was a woman Torah scholar who was versed in a range of Jewish works including Talmud, Jewish law, and kabbalistic literature.

Fioretta's husband, Solomon of Modena, was the uncle of the scholar and rabbi Leon of Modena. Fioretta's grandson was Aaron Berechiah, a rabbi and Kabbalist. Fioretta reportedly was heavily involved in her grandson's tutelage. Fioretta's sister, Diana Rieti of Mantua, was also well versed in Jewish teachings. Following the death of her husband, Fioretta, aged 75, sought to travel to the Land of Israel for an equivalent of monastic retirement. According to family history, Fioretta died before reaching her destination.
