= Rebecca bat Meir Tiktiner =

Polish writer

Rebecca bat Meir Tiktiner (Hebrew: רבקה בת מאיר טיקטינר; died 1605), was a Yiddish writer, whose works include a treatise on Jewish ethics in the style of musar literature as well as a poem about Simchat Torah.

== Life ==
She or her father probably resided in the northeast Poland town of Tykocin. According to the records of the Old New Synagogue, she was married to someone with rabbinic training (ha-rav rabbi).

Her ethical treatise Meneket Rivkah (Prague, 1609. Cracow, 1618) is 36 folios long and organized by seven gates. The author focuses on the duties of a housewife in various relationships (e.g., to husband or guest) as well as a general ethical approach, dealing with niddah, health social practices. The treatise includes stories from the Talmud and midrashic literature. Tiktiner differentiates between the wisdom of the body and of the soul (guf and nefesh). This practical guidelines "paint a vivid picture of Jewish women's daily lives in the early modern period." Von Rohde claims that this is "probably the first substantive published book in Yiddish written by a Jewish women [sic])".

Rebecca also wrote a rhymed Yiddish hymn for the holiday of Simḥat Torah entitled Eyn Simkhes-Toyre Lid, which describes an eschatological, festive banquet for men and women alike. The poem, which survives in two separate undated 17th century printings, consists of 40 rhyming couplets (with acrostic), in which each verse is followed by the refrain hallelujah.

She was born before 1550 and died in 1605. She was buried in Prague.

== See also ==
- Paula Dei Mansi

== Bibliography ==
- Cooper, Levi. "From the Classics: A Remnant of Tiktin". Jewish Educational Leadership Vol 4 no. 1 (Fall 2005) pp. 42–46.
- Kadari, Tamar. "Rebecca Tiktiner's Simhat Torah Poem" in Nashim: A Journal of Jewish Women's Studies & Gender Issues Fall 2007, No. 14:233-241
- Ochser, Schulim (1905). "Tiktiner, Rebecca Bat Meïr". In Singer, Isidore (ed.). Jewish Encyclopedia. Vol. 12. London: Funk & Wagnalls. p. 146. Also available from the Internet Archive
- Meir, Rivkah bat (2008). von Rohden, Frauke (ed.). Meneket Rivkah: A manual of wisdom and piety for Jewish women. Translated by Spinner, Samuel; Tszorf, Maurice. Philadelphia: Jewish Publication Society. ISBN 978-0-8276-0835-1. OCLC 694363680.
- von Rohden, Frauke (2007). "Rebecca bat Meir Tiktiner". In Skolnik, Fred; Berenbaum, Michael (eds.). Encyclopaedia Judaica. Vol. 17 (Second ed.). Thomson Gale. pp. 136–137. ISBN 978-0-02-865945-9.
- Shmeruk, Chone, "The First Jewish Authoress in Poland - Rivka Tiktiner and her Works”, Gal Ed 4-5 (1978), pp. 1–11 (in Hebrew).
- Zinberg, Israel. Old Yiddish Literature from Its Origins to the Haskalah Period. KTAV, 1975. ISBN 0-87068-465-5. On Rebecca bat Meir Tiktiner's Simchat Torah poem, see p. 51ff.
