= Drisha Institute =

Coordinates: 40.7728°N 73.9813°W

The Drisha Institute for Jewish Education is a center for advanced Jewish learning located on the Upper West Side of New York City. Though initially founded to promote advanced scholarship for women, it has since expanded to offer text-based learning for men and women of all ages.

== Educational programs ==
Drisha offers ongoing classes, community lectures (including Dirshu: Confronting Challenges with Heart and Mind), a Winter Week of Learning, the Drishat Shalom Fellowship for graduate students and young professionals, winter and summer programs for college students, a summer program for high school girls, High Holiday prayer services, an executive seminar, and various programs in Israel.

== History ==
Drisha was founded by Rabbi David Silber in 1979 as the world's first center dedicated specifically to women's studies of classical Jewish texts (e.g., the Hebrew Bible and Talmud). Rabbi Silber received ordination from Yeshiva University's Rabbi Isaac Elchanan Theological Seminary, and was the recipient of the Covenant Award in 2000. He is the author of A Passover Haggadah: Go Forth and Learn.

== See also ==
- Jewish feminism
- Midrasha - overview of higher Jewish learning institutions for women.
- Role of women in Judaism - discusses various views of woman's study, including Haredi objections to Talmud study by women.
- Torah study - discusses the mitzvah of learning.
- similarly focused Midrashot:
  - Matan
  - Nishmat
  - Midreshet Lindenbaum
  - Midreshet Ein HaNetziv
- Yeshivot ordaining women:
  - Beit Midrash Har'el (Orthodox)
  - Maharat (Open Orthodox)
