= Nishmat (midrasha) =

Coordinates: 31.74947°N 35.20281°E

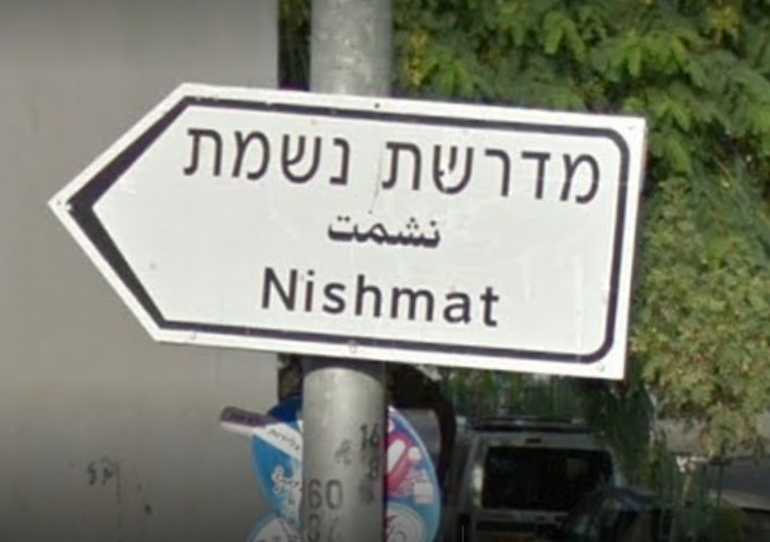
Nishmat - Women's Midrasha in Jerusalem

Nishmat: The Jeanie Schottenstein Center for Advanced Torah Study for Women is an institution of higher Torah learning for women, or midrasha. It was one of the first educational frameworks to teach Talmud to women. It is a pioneer in certification of women as Yoatzot Halacha, experts in the intersection of women's health and Halacha. Nishmat opened in the Kiryat Moshe neighborhood of Jerusalem and later moved to Bayit VeGan. It is currently located in the Pat neighborhood of Jerusalem.

== History ==
Nishmat was founded in 1990 by Rabbanit Chana Henkin. Now situated in Jerusalem's Pat neighborhood, west of Katamon, Nishmat is a center for women's scholarship, leadership, and social responsibility. Ten years after its founding, Nishmat created the new religious role of Yoatzot Halacha, women halachic advisors. At the same time, the school established what has become an acclaimed advancement program for Ethiopian-Israelis, coupling Jewish studies with an intensive program moving young Ethiopian women from the social margins to the mainstream of Israeli society.

In 1995, Nishmat filed a discrimination lawsuit in Israel's High Court. The complaint was that male students received a monthly allowance of 375 NIS, 280% more than female students, who each received 135 NIS.

In 2013, the first class of female halachic advisers trained to practice in the US graduated; they graduated from the North American branch of Nishmat’s yoetzet halacha program in a ceremony at Congregation Shearith Israel, Spanish and Portuguese Synagogue in Manhattan.

== Programs ==
In addition to general programs in advanced Jewish studies, Nishmat has a program to train Yoatzot, advisers in Jewish law concerning matters particular to women, such as laws of Niddah (family purity), contraception and health issues. The hotline was established in 1997. In addition to community roles, the Yoatzot operate a 24-hour hotline, for women with questions regarding Jewish family law.

Nishmat offers text-based learning programs to women of different ages and background. The English-speaking programs offer beginners, intermediate and advanced level shiurim (classes). Nishmat offers chevruta-based (pairs) learning. There is a strong emphasis on developing skills for independent textual study within an atmosphere stressing spiritual growth and a strong commitment to Jewish Law.

In 2004, Nishmat began a one-year program called Shana Ba'aretz for American students who wanted to study in Israel during their gap year before college. All students learn in the bet midrash (study room) together, regardless of program, background or age.

== See also ==
- Jewish feminism
- Role of women in Judaism
- Torah study
- Matan Women's Institute for Torah Studies
- Midreshet Lindenbaum
- Midreshet Ein HaNetziv
- Drisha Institute
