= Ray Frank =

American Jewish religious leader (1861–1948)

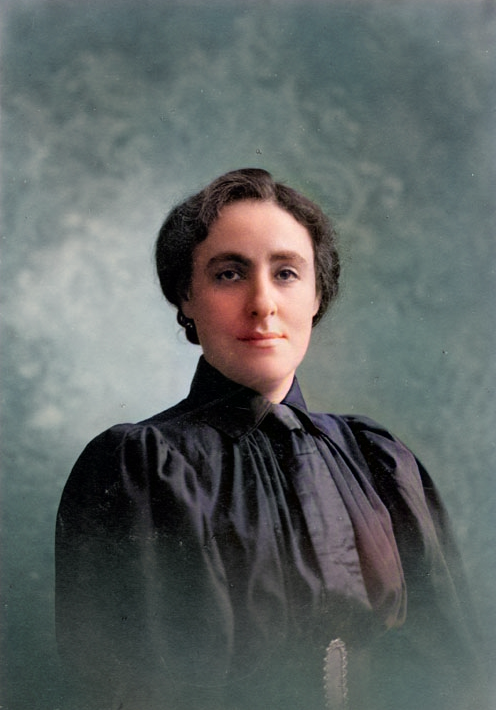
Ray Frank-Litman (1900) (The American Jewish Historical Society, colorized)

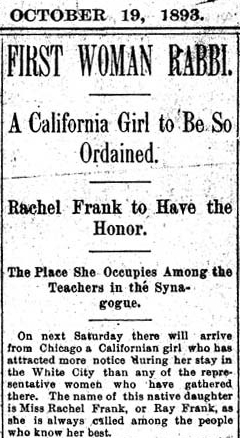
An 1898 article incorrectly announcing Frank would be ordained as the first female rabbi. San Francisco Chronicle October 19, 1898.

Rachel Frank (April 10, 1861, in San Francisco – October 10, 1948) was a Jewish religious leader in the United States. Frank was an early figure in the acceptance of women rabbis and was reported as a prospective candidate for the first woman rabbi in the United States.

== Biography ==
Frank was the daughter of Polish immigrants, Bernard and Leah Frank. As a young woman, Frank taught Bible studies and Jewish history at the First Hebrew Congregation of Oakland's Sabbath school, where she began to hone her skills as a public speaker and make a name for herself within the California Jewish community. Her students included Gertrude Stein, later to become a famous writer, and Judah Leon Magnes, who would become a prominent Reform rabbi. At the same time, Frank worked as a correspondent for several San Francisco and Oakland newspapers and was a frequent contributor to a number of national Jewish publications.

On September 14, 1890, Frank gave the Rosh Hashanah sermon for a community in Spokane, Washington, thus becoming the first woman to preach from a synagogue pulpit, although she was not a rabbi. Her impassioned sermon left a deep impression on the townspeople, Christians as well as Jews, and kickstarted her career as "the Girl Rabbi of the Golden West", helping to blaze new paths for women in Judaism. Despite the fact that Frank claimed to have no interest in becoming a rabbi, her actions forced American Jewry to consider the possibility of the ordination of women seriously for the first time.

As a result, Frank spent much of the 1890s traveling up and down the West coast giving lectures to B'nai B'rith lodges, literary societies, and synagogue women's groups, speaking in both Reform and Orthodox synagogues, giving sermons, officiating at services, and even reading Scripture. Although headlines began to refer to Frank, incorrectly, as the first woman rabbi, and she was reportedly offered several pulpits, Frank insisted that she had never had any desire for ordination.

In 1893, The Register-Guard, a newspaper based in Oregon, reported that "Miss Ray Frank, a highly educated young woman from Oakland, Cal., is about to study for the Jewish pulpit."

The newness of the Jewish communities in the West likely contributed significantly to Frank's ability to do what she did. Had more established Jewish institutions and a well-entrenched Jewish leadership existed on the West Coast, Frank might never have been given the opportunity to preach. By occupying the pulpit temporarily, Frank opened the door, however slightly, for Jewish women's long journey towards public religious leadership.

== See also ==
- Lena Aronsohn
- Hannah G. Solomon

== Bibliography ==
- Simon Litman: Ray Frank Litman: A Memoir. Studies in American Jewish history #3. American Jewish Historical Society, NY 1957.
- R. Clar and W.M. Kramer: The Girl Rabbi of the Golden West. In: Western States Jewish History, 18 (1986), 91–111, 223–36, 336–51
- Umansky, Ellen (2007). "Ray Frank". In Berenbaum, Michael; Skolnik, Fred (eds.). Encyclopaedia Judaica. Vol. 7 (2nd ed.). Detroit: Macmillan Reference USA. pp. 193–194. ISBN 978-0-02-866097-4.
- Pamela Susan Nadell: Women Who Would Be Rabbis: a history of women's ordination, 1889-1985. Beacon Press, Boston 1998. ISBN 0-8070-3648-X
- Rosenbaum, Fred, "San Francisco-Oakland: The Native Son", in Brinner, William M. & Rischin, Moses. Like All the Nations?: The Life and Legacy of Judah L. Magnes, State University of New York Press, 1987. ISBN 0-88706-507-4
