= Lena Aronsohn =

One of the first female rabbis in the American Jewish community

- Born: 1870; Louisiana, U.S.
- Died: ?
- Occupations: Prospective rabbinical student; lecturer on Judaism
- Known for: Early figure discussed in the context of women in the American rabbinate

Lena Aronsohn (b. 1870) was reported to be an early figure in the American Jewish community's transition to accept women rabbis. Aronsohn was described in the American press as potentially becoming the first woman rabbi. She was a candidate for the rabbinate at the same time as Ray Frank; however, neither Aronshon nor Frank completed their studies or received ordination.

Aronsohn was born in 1870 in Louisiana and her family soon moved to Marshall, Texas. In 1888 Aronsohn moved to Hot Springs, Arkansas where she worked as a music teacher in the local public schools. Aronsohn's mother died a few years later. In 1892 and 1893, Lena Aronsohn became the subject of several news stories concerning her intention to study to become a rabbi. The American press speculated that it was the death of Aronsohn's mother as well as financial hardship that led to the decision to pursue a rabbinical career. In early 1893, The American Israelite rejected the report as unfounded.

Aronsohn was also reported to deliver public lectures on Judaism to various Jewish congregations.

== Gallery ==
News clippings reporting on Lena Aronsohn
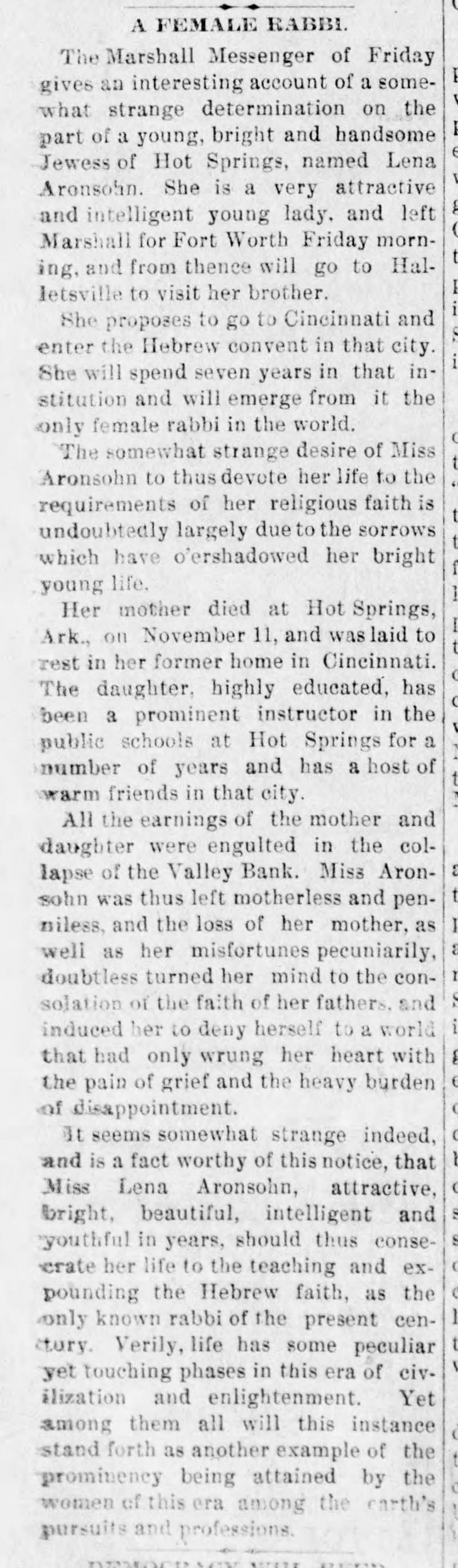
1892 article on Lena Aronsohn The Times (Shreveport, Louisiana), 22 Dec 1892, Thursday. Page 4.

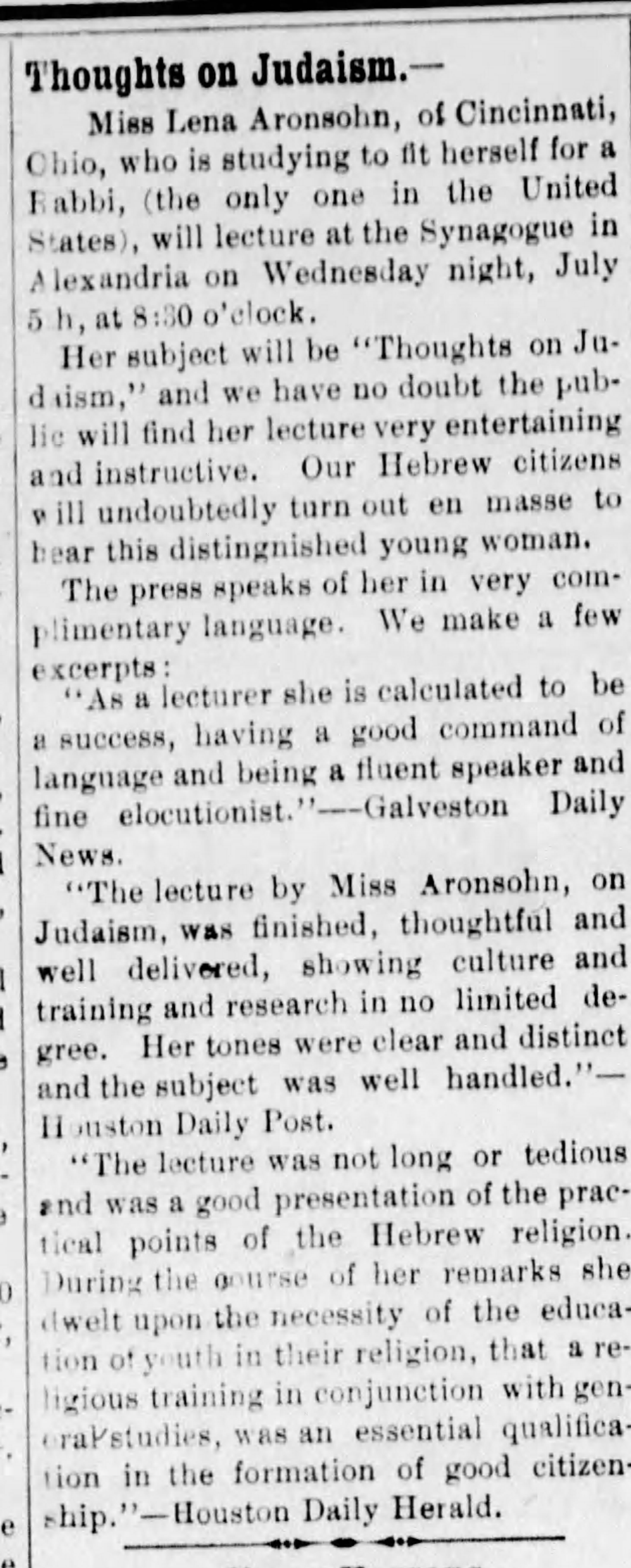
1893 article on Aronsohn Weekly Town Talk (Alexandria, Louisiana), 1 Jul 1893, Sat. Page 2.

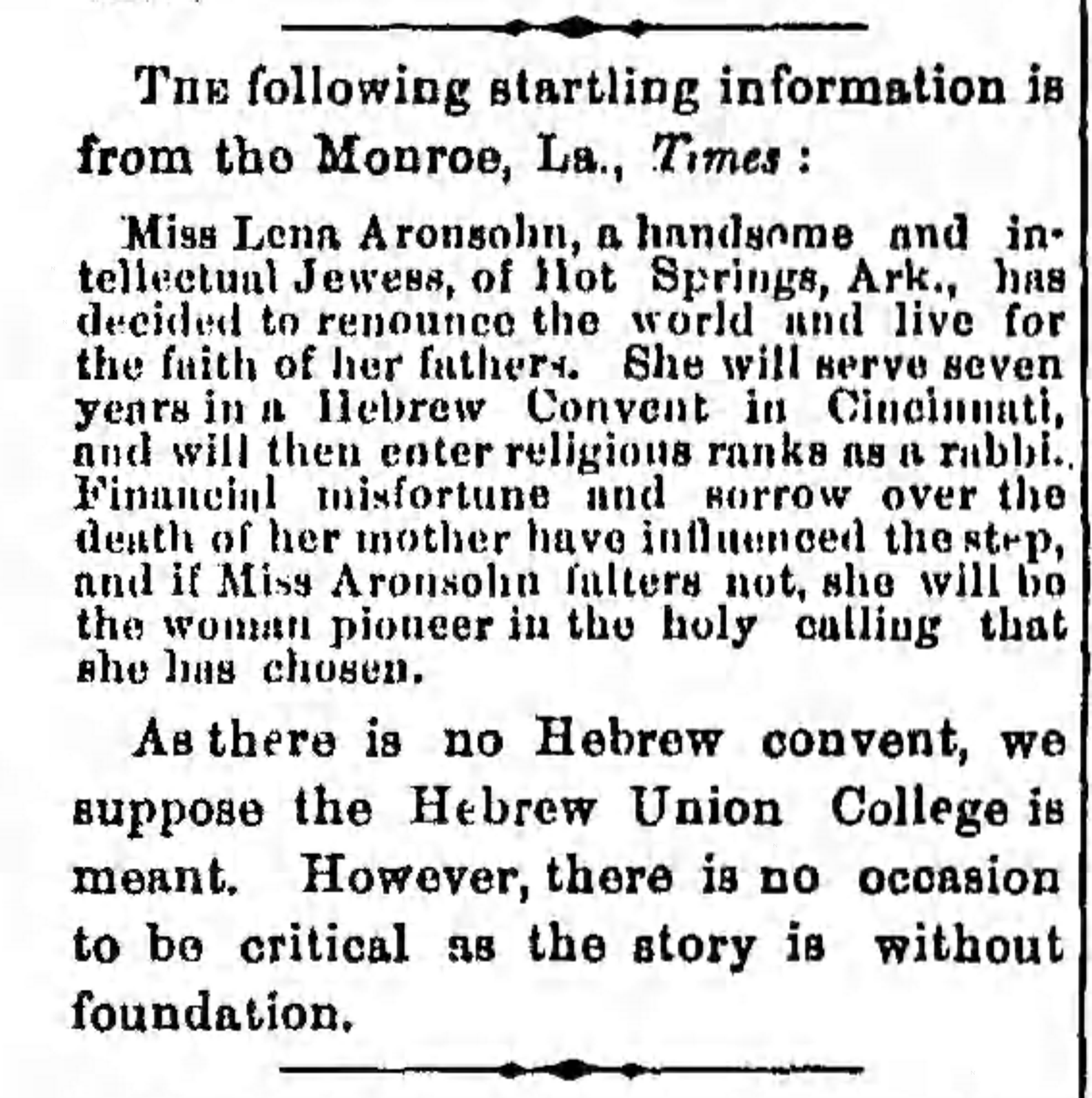
1893 article on Aronsohn The American Israelite (Cincinnati, Ohio), 12 Jan 1893, Thursday. Page 4.

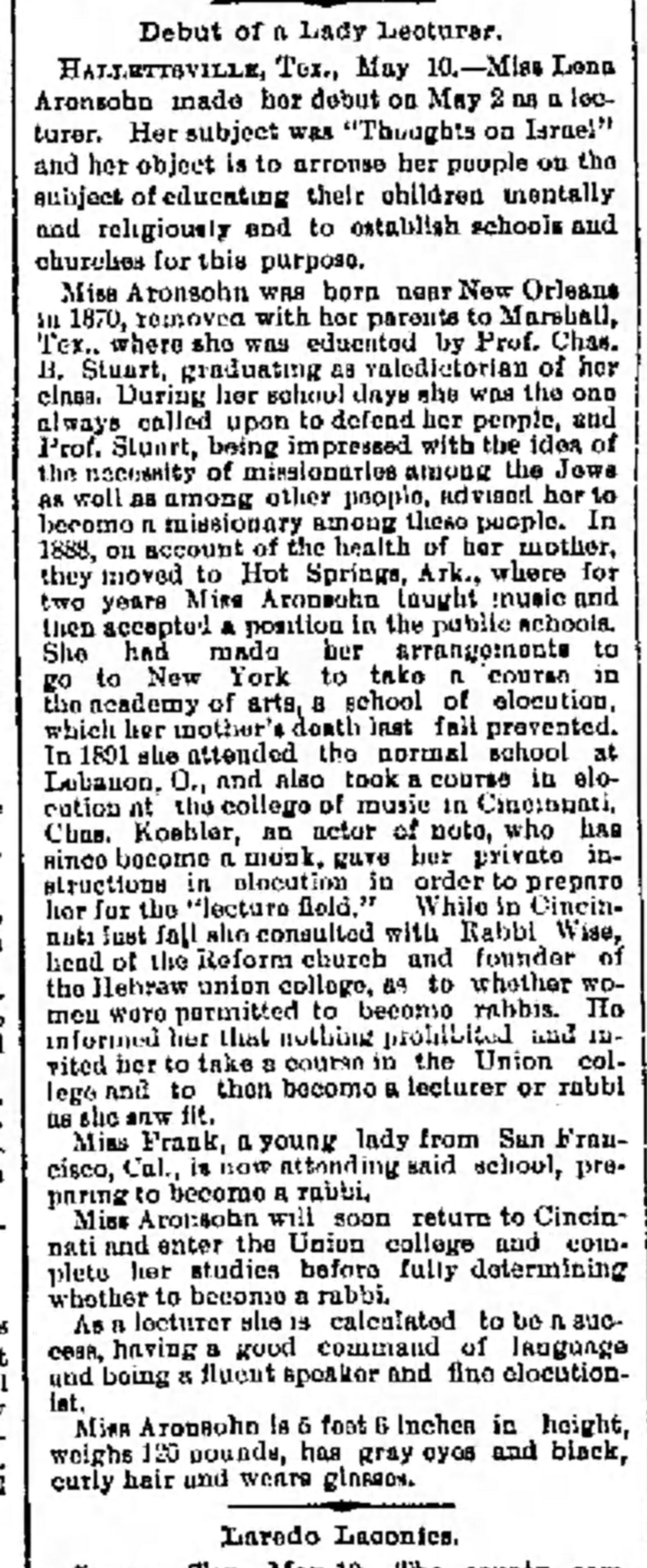
1893 article on Aronsohn The Galveston Daily News (Galveston, Texas), 11 May 1893, Thursday. Page 6.

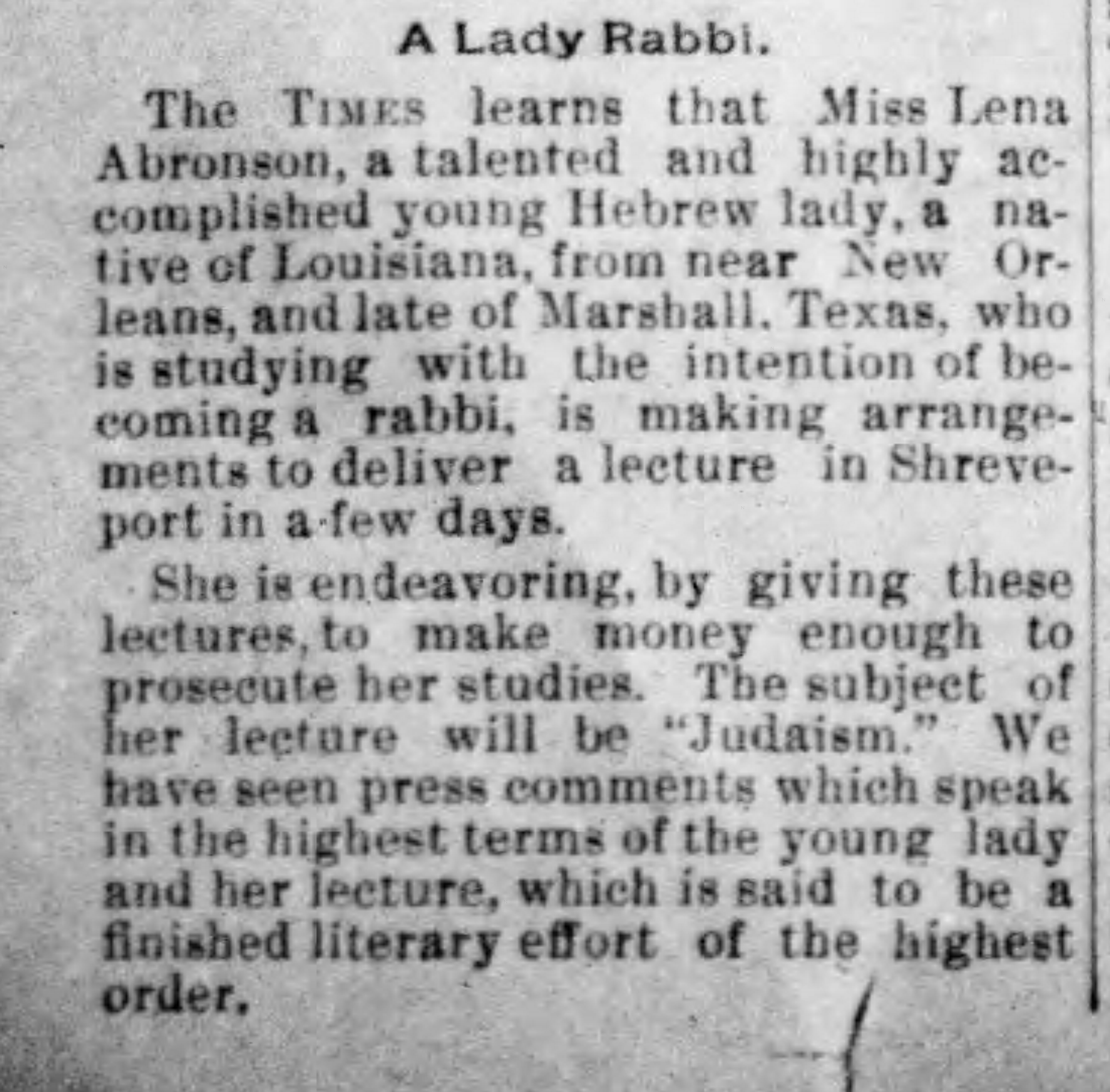
1893 report of Aronsohn's activities in Louisiana (Shreveport Times, 7 July 1893)

== See also ==
- Hannah G. Solomon
- Ray Frank
