= Susanna Rubinstein =

Austrian psychologist (1847–1914)

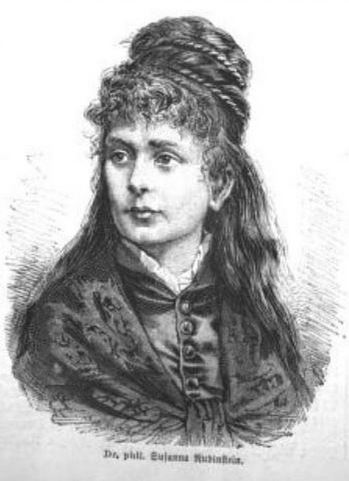
- Portrait in Illustrirte Zeitung, 1882
- Born: 20 September 1847; Czernowitz, Austrian Empire
- Died: 29 March 1914 (aged 66); Würzburg, German Empire
- Education: University of Bern
- Occupation: Psychologist
- Known for: Psychological-Aesthetic Essays
- Father: Isak Rubinstein

Susanna Rubinstein (20 September 1847 – 29 March 1914) was an Austrian psychologist and the first woman to earn a doctorate from the University of Bern in Switzerland.

== Biography ==
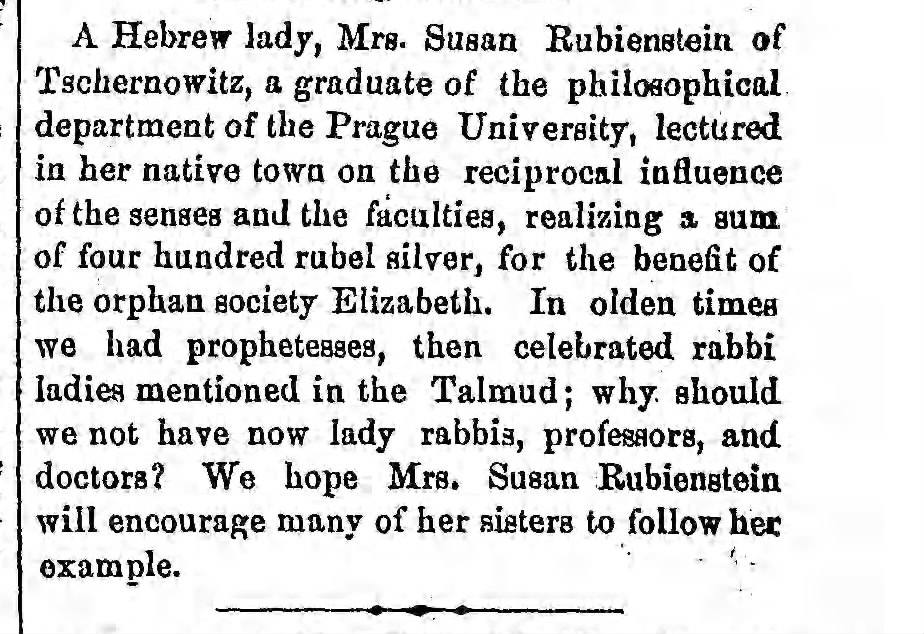
1871 report on Susanna Rubinstein in The American Israelite (19 May 1871, page 9)

Rubinstein was born in Czernowitz (then part of Austrian Empire, now Chernivtsi, Ukraine) on 20 September 1847 into the Jewish family of the banker and parliamentarian Isak Rubinstein (c. 1804–1878). Her mother died when she was young.

She and her three siblings were greatly encouraged to pursue their education, even though this was a time when girls were often denied that opportunity. (A high school for girls was eventually opened in Czernowitz in 1898 and a girls' grammar school was established only during the years just before the First World War.)

At first, her father arranged for Rubinstein to take private lessons but, when it came time to finish high school, she was unable to take the necessary examinations from tutors, so she did so before an academic committee from a boys' high school.

Rubinstein went on to study psychology and German literature at the University of Prague, in the spring of 1870, and then at Leipzig University three years later. After being denied admission to the doctoral program in Basel, Switzerland, she enrolled at the University of Bern and there gained her Ph.D. in 1874 in psychology and German literature. By doing so, she became the first woman to receive a doctorate in Bern. Her thesis was "Uber die sensoriellen und sensitiven Sinne" ("About the sensory and sensitive senses").

With the completion of her doctorate, Rubinstein spent a year in Germany visiting Leipzig, Heidelberg and Munich.

Her 1878 work "Psychologisch-Asthetische Essays" ("Psychological-Aesthetic Essays") has been described as "a major contribution to the study of human emotions". It was reprinted in 2012 (Nabu Press, ISBN 978-1277814729).

Susanna Rubinstein died 29 March 1914 in Würzburg, Germany.

== Selected publications ==
- Psychologisch-ästhetische Essays (Heidelberg, 1878)
- Aus der Innerwelt. Psychologische Studien (Leipzig, 1888)
- Ein individualistischer Pessimist. Beitrag zur Würdigung Philipp Mainländers. (Leipzig, 1894)
- Eine Trias von Willensmetaphysikern. Populär-philosophische Essays. (Leipzig, 1896)
- Schiller-Probleme. (Leipzig, 1908)
- Lexikalischer Schiller-Kommentar (Berlin, 1913)
