= Avis Clamitz =

American reform rabbi

Avis Clamitz Shulman (1908–1991) was a significant figure in the early history of women in the American rabbinate. In the 1920s, Clamitz enrolled in the Hebrew Union College (HUC) rabbinical program, graduating in 1927, and periodically served as a rabbi in an unofficial capacity for small congregations in Virginia. In some instances, newspaper reports would describe Clamitz as occupying the role of a rabbi. In 1935, and later in 1946, Clamitz was reported to have completed her studies and received ordination. However, according to later researchers, the HUC program granted Clamitz a Bachelor of Hebrew Letters in place of an ordination.

== Family ==
Clamitz's parents were Samuel Clamitz (d. 1934) and Bertha Appel. On June 27, 1929, Clamitz was married to Rabbi Charles E. Shulman. They had one child, Deborah Louise.

== See also ==
- Martha Neumark
- Paula Herskovitz Ackerman
