= Dora Askowith =

American historian (1884–1958)

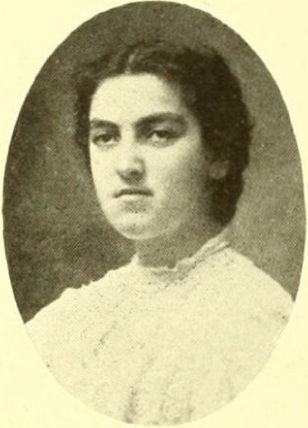
- Askowith, from the 1908 yearbook of Barnard College
- Born: August 30, 1884; Kovno, Kovno Governorate, Russian Empire (now Lithuania)
- Died: October 23, 1958 (aged 74); The Bronx, New York, U.S.
- Occupations: Historian, college professor

Dora Askowith (August 30, 1884 – October 23, 1958) was a Lithuanian-born American college professor, author and historian. Askowith was a founding member and first director of the Women’s Organization for the American Jewish Congress.

== Early life and education ==
Askowith was born on August 30, 1884 in Kovno, Kovno Governorate (present-day Kaunas, Lithuania) to Jacob Baruch Askowith and Sara Golde Askowith (née Arenovski). One of six siblings, the family moved to Boston the same year as Askowith's birth. In 1891, her father and her brother Charles designed one of the early versions of the Flag of Israel.

In 1902, Askowith graduated from the Girls' High School, and from the School's advanced course the following year. Enrolling at Barnard College, Askowith graduated in 1908 with a BA in history and anthropology. Askowith began studying medieval and modern history, sociology, and philosophy at Columbia University the following year, earning her MA in 1910 and her PhD in political science in 1915.

Askowith continued her studies and research at the American School of Oriental Research, the American Academy in Rome and the Jewish Institute of Religion.

== Career and legacy ==
Askowith taught at high schools in New York City before she earned her Ph.D. From 1912 to 1957, she taught at Hunter College, and was founder of the Hunter Menorah Society and advisor to the International Relations Club. She also taught at the New School for Social Research. For a short period in the 1920s, Askowith studied at rabbinical school, although ordination was denied to female students. She was a founding member and the first director of the Women's Organization of the American Jewish Congress.

Askowith died in 1958, at the age of 74, at a hospital in the Bronx. In the 2020s, Hunter College began the "Little Aunt Dora" lecture series, named for Askowith by her niece, philanthropist Patti Askwith Kenner.

== Publications ==
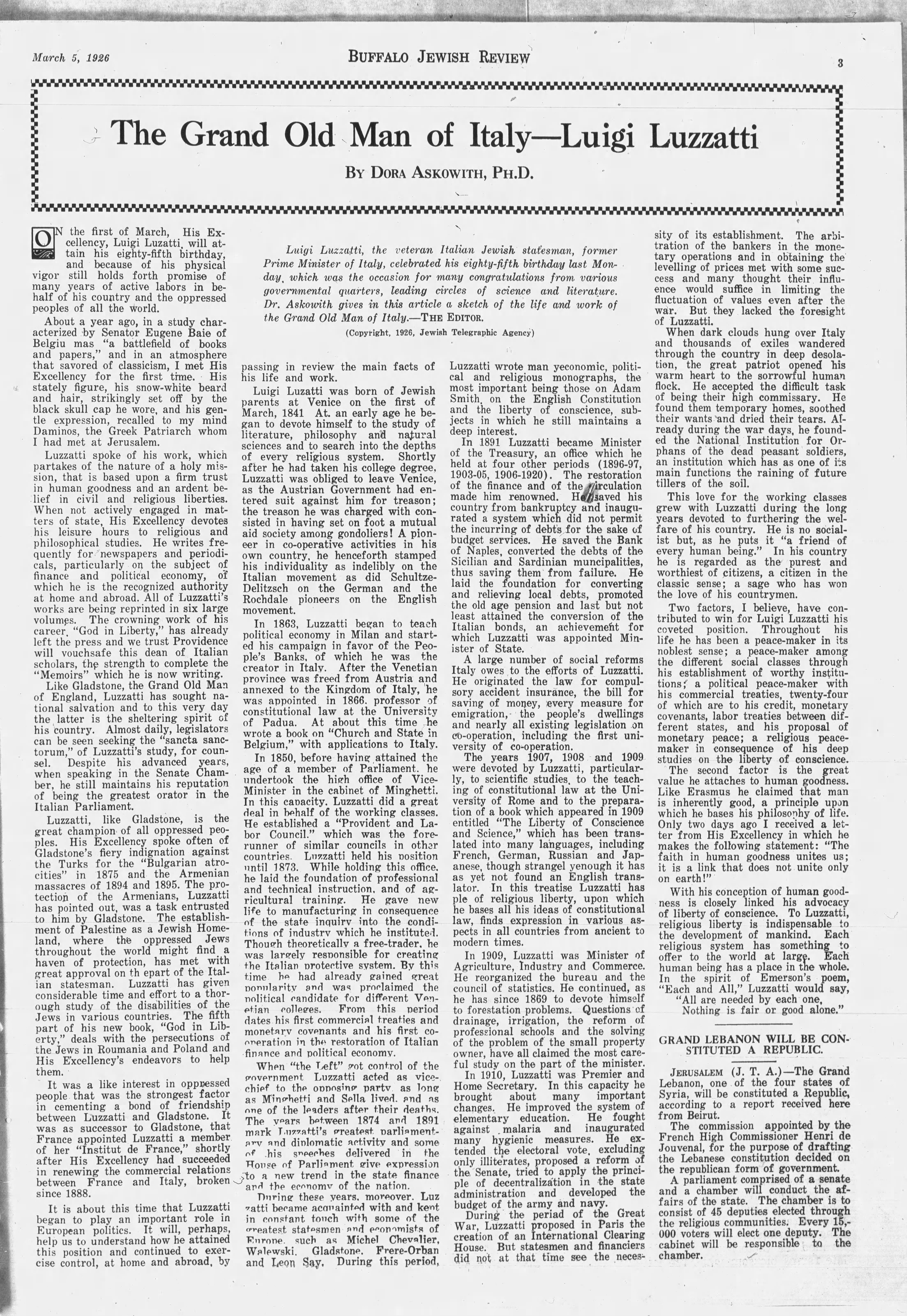
Article by Dora Askowith (Buffalo Jewish Review, 5 Mar 1926, p.3)

=== Books ===
- The Toleration of the Jews in the Roman Empire. Part I. The Toleration of the Jews Under Julius Caesar and Augustus (Columbia University, 1915)
- Three Outstanding Women: Mary Fels, Rebekah Kohut, Annie Nathan Meyer (1941)

=== Book chapters ===
- Askowith, D. (1927). “Prolegomena: Legal Fictions or Evasions of the Law.” In Jewish Studies in Memory of Israel Abrahams (New York: Jewish Institute of Religion).
- Askowith, D. (1930). “The Life and Work of Luigi Luzzatti.” In Luzzatti, L. (Ed.) God in Freedom: Studies in the Relations Between Church and State (New York: Macmillan).

=== Journal articles ===
- Askowith, D. (1944). "The first Zionist flag" Jewish Social Studies, 55-57.
- Askowith, D. (1947). "Ezekiel and St. Augustine: A comparative study" Journal of the American Academy of Religion, 15(4), 224-227.
- Askowith, D. (1956). "The role of women in the field of higher Jewish education" Judaism, 5(2), 169.

=== Other ===
- A Call to the Jewish Women of America (c. 1917) (pamphlet)
- The purchase of Louisiana (1953) (unknown)
