= Bayla Falk =

Talmudist

Personal life
- Born: Lemberg, Ruthenia, Kingdom of Poland
- Died: Jerusalem, Ottoman Syria
- Spouse: Joshua Falk
- Parent: Israel Edels (father)

Religious life
- Religion: Judaism

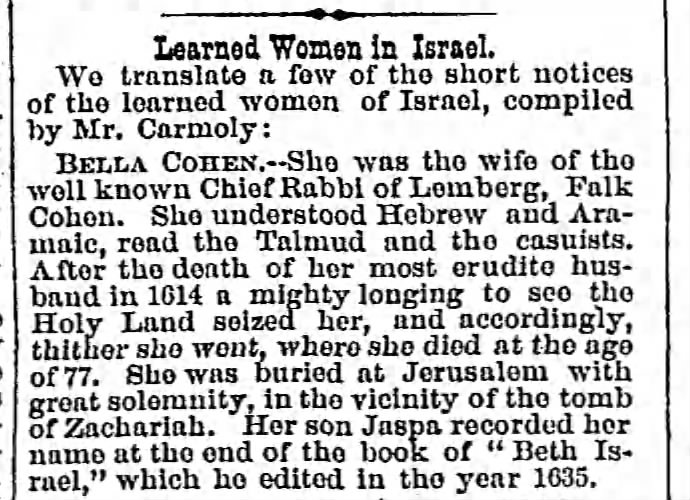
Description of Bella Cohen (Bayla Falk) as a Torah scholar (The American Israelite, 19 April 1867)

Bayla Falk (Yiddish: ביילא פאלק) (Note: Also spelled Beila Falk and Bella Cohen.) was a woman of Talmudic learning. She was born in Lemberg about the middle of the sixteenth century, and died at an advanced age at Jerusalem.

== Biography ==
Bayla Falk was a daughter of the philanthropist and head of the community at Lemberg, Israel Edels, and wife of the well-known Talmudist Joshua Falk, author of the Sefer Me'irat 'Enayim. She moved to Jerusalem after her husband's death in 1614.

Bayla had a strong inclination toward Talmudic studies, and gave some decisions on certain difficult halakhic cases. One of these was that on festivals the festive blessing over the lights should be said before and not after the lights are kindled.
