= Paula Dei Mansi =

Paula Dei Mansi (died after 1288) was a Jewish scribe and Torah scholar. She is thought to be the earliest known female Jewish scribe. Dei Mansi was the daughter of Abraham Anau of Verona and belonged to a family of scribes that their roots to Rabbi Nathan ben Jehiel of Rome (1035-1110), author of a noted Jewish legal work. Evidence of Dei Mansi’s skill extends beyond that of scribe to that of a Torah scholar. Dei Mansi contributed to her father's biblical commentary, adding her own explanations in the commentary, in addition to translating the work from Hebrew into Italian. Dei Mansi also transcribed a Hebrew prayer book and added her own explanations as commentary to the prayers. A third work, a collection of laws, is known to have been transcribed by Dei Mansi who wrote the work at the request of a relative.
