= Jane Evans (activist) =

American Reform Jewish leader (1907–2004)

Jane Evans (1907–2004) was the executive director of the National Federation of Temple Sisterhoods (now the Women of Reform Judaism) from 1933 to 1976. She was its first full-time Executive Director, as from 1913 until 1933 (its first twenty years) the National Federation of Temple Sisterhoods was led by volunteer presidents. Evans also became president of the National Peace Conference in 1950. On April 29, 1957, she spoke to 1,000 delegates at a biennial general assembly meeting of the Union for Reform Judaism (then called the Union of American Hebrew Congregations (UAHC)) in favor of ordaining women, a speech which The New York Times called a "strong plea," though the UAHC took no action. While Evans was still executive director of the National Federation of Temple Sisterhoods in 1963, it approved a resolution at its biennial assembly calling on the UAHC, the Central Conference of American Rabbis, and the Hebrew Union College-Jewish Institute of Religion to move forward on the ordination of women.

In 1958, Evans reported that she and several other women had informally filled the role of rabbis upon the request of their congregations.

In 2003, Rabbi Adrienne Scott, who was then a rabbinic student at Hebrew Union College-Jewish Institute of Religion in Cincinnati, wrote her thesis on Jane Evans, titled An Analysis of Dr. Jane Evans' Professional Contributions to the National Federation of Temple Sisterhoods; it is the first and as of 2005 the only full-length study of Evans' life.

The Jane Evans Papers are now held in the American Jewish Archives, where they were donated by the Union for Reform Judaism in June 2004.
