= Yoetzet halacha =

Woman advisor on Jewish menstruation practices

Yoetzet Halacha (Hebrew: Hebrew: יועצת הלכה, plural Yoatzot Halacha, יועצות הלכה; lit. 'female advisor in Jewish law') is an advisory role within Orthodox Judaism in which a woman is trained and certified to counsel other women on questions relating to Taharat HaMishpacha (Jewish family purity) and associated laws and women’s health issues. The position was established to provide halachic guidance in areas that many women find sensitive and prefer to discuss with another woman.

== Overview ==
A Yoetzet Halacha specializes in the application of Jewish law concerning taharat hamishpacha, the laws governing menstruation (niddah), mikveh immersion, marital relations, fertility, and related aspects of women’s physical and spiritual well-being. These advisors respond to questions from women, educate on halachic and medical aspects of these topics, and serve as a supportive resource for women who wish to observe Jewish law and tradition.

Although Yoatzot provide detailed halachic information and guidance, they do not issue original halachic rulings (psak); complex or novel cases are referred to qualified rabbinic authorities. Yoatzot operate within a halachic framework established by supervising rabbinic authorities, and their responses are reviewed and approved in accordance with those rulings..

== History and training ==
The role of Yoetzet Halacha was pioneered by Nishmat – The Jeanie Schottenstein Center for Advanced Torah Study for Women, an Orthodox women’s seminary in Jerusalem. The program was instituted in 1997 by Rabbanit Chana Henkin to train women in Taharat HaMishpacha and related areas of halacha. Yoatzot Halacha complete a rigorous 2-year course of study overseen by rabbinic instructors and are certified following examination and approval by a panel of rabbinic scholars. Nishmat’s Yoatzot Halacha program later expanded internationally. In 2006, the Miriam Glaubach Center was established to train Yoatzot in North America, and a Fellows Program followed. As of 2026, approximately 200 women have been certified as Yoatzot Halacha in Israel and around the world.

== Role and activities ==
Yoatzot Halacha serve as a first point of contact for women seeking guidance on intimate halachic issues and frequently provide:

- Educational content, including articles, podcasts, and videos on halachic and health topics;
- Confidential counseling, via telephone hotlines and digital services in multiple languages;
- Community support, by offering classes, workshops, and responses tailored to women’s needs.

They also assist in navigating complex intersections between halacha and medical realities, often consulting with medical professionals to ensure accurate, sensitive guidance.

== Reception and impact ==
Support for Yoatzot Halacha is most prevalent within Modern and Centrist Orthodox communities, where the role is seen as enhancing Taharat HaMishpacha observance by encouraging inquiry, education, and comfort in addressing sensitive questions. Some rabbinic authorities endorse their contributions, while others within more traditional segments of Orthodoxy have expressed reservations regarding women’s formal roles in halachic advisory capacities. In 2017, The Rabbinic Panel of the Orthodox Union, one of the largest Jewish Orthodox organizations in the United States, recognized that “In a number of communities these advisors (Yoatzot Halacha) have played a deeply significant role and have increased the comfort level of many women in posing halakhic questions in this most sensitive area of observance.
