= Orthodox Jewish feminism =

Movement in Orthodox Judaism

Orthodox Jewish feminism (also known as Orthodox feminism amongst Jews) is a movement in Orthodox Judaism which seeks to further the cause of a more egalitarian approach to Jewish practice within the bounds of Jewish Law. The major organizations of this movement is the Jewish Orthodox Feminist Alliance (JOFA) in North America, and Women of the Wall (WOW) and its affiliates in Israel and internationally, known as The International Committee for Women of the Wall (ICWOW). In Israel, the leading Orthodox feminist organization is Kolech, founded by Dr. Chana Kehat. In Australia, there is one Orthodox partnership minyan, Shira Hadasha, in Melbourne.

The movement relies on liberal interpretations of Jewish Law, by both modern and classical rabbinic scholars, taking advantage of the lack of universal consensus on legal interpretations amongst rabbis in different eras.

In 2016, Lila Kagedan officially became the first female Orthodox rabbi, while serving in Melbourne, Australia. Later in 2016, Rabbi Kagedan was hired as rabbi at Modern Orthodox Mount Freedom Jewish Center in Randolph, New Jersey, becoming the first orthodox female rabbi in the United States. Rabbi Kagedan is currently working at Walnut Street Synagogue in Massachusetts. In 2021, Shira Marili Mirvis was appointed to be the spiritual leader of the Shirat HaTamar synagogue in Efrat, Israel.

== Characteristics ==
Orthodox feminists, using historical precedents and the aforementioned liberal legal interpretations, allow the practice of ritual in manners that more traditional or conservative interpretations consider as befitting only to men. Many of the practices of Orthodox feminists are held to be controversial because of their different approach to the everyday routine of most Orthodox Jews. Several specific rituals and practices are of particular concern:

=== Fighting for Agunot ===
Agunot are women who have asked for a divorce, or who have been left by their husband, and the husband refuses to grant a get. A get is a Jewish certificate of divorce required for the woman to be able to remarry. Recalcitrant husbands are pressured by society to grant the get to the wife, who is stuck in limbo, without a husband and unable to remarry.

Orthodox feminists make a priority of fighting on the behalf of agunot, and the "agunah crisis". Many fight in organizations specifically for this purpose, and some work independently.

=== Interaction with the Torah ===
Kissing the Torah scroll with a siddur (prayer book), hand, or directly with the lips, during Shabbath, Yom Tob, services is a convention found in many Modern Orthodox congregations as well as non-Orthodox ones. While many may take it for granted as an integral part of worship services, it is not practiced in Haredi and Chassidic congregations. Dancing with the Torah and having hakafoth (processional circuits) around the sanctuary on Simhath Torath is another way in which many Orthodox Jews interact with the Torah which is an especially important ritual in feminist circles. These are some reasons why this act has special meaning in Orthodox feminist circles.

=== Participation in Zimmunim ===
One of the most prevalent, and perhaps least controversial practices of Orthodox feminists, even done by some women outside of the movement, is the participation in a women's zimmun. The women's zimmun takes place when less than three men have eaten together, but where three or more women have eaten together. A zimmun is a formal call to prayer said before the communal recitation of Birkath Hamazon. One formula for the women's zimmun is exactly the same formula as the zimmun of men, but substituting chaverot (Hebrew: friends (f.)) for the word rabotai (Hebrew: gentlemen) in the beginning of the invitation, thus feminizing the call.

=== Use of the Tallit ===
In Orthodox feminism, the donning of a tallit (prayer shawl) is not seen as the wearing of a man's garment, neither is it seen as an affront to the community. These reasons make the wearing of prayer shawls by women common in Orthodox feminist circles.

=== Use of Tefillin ===
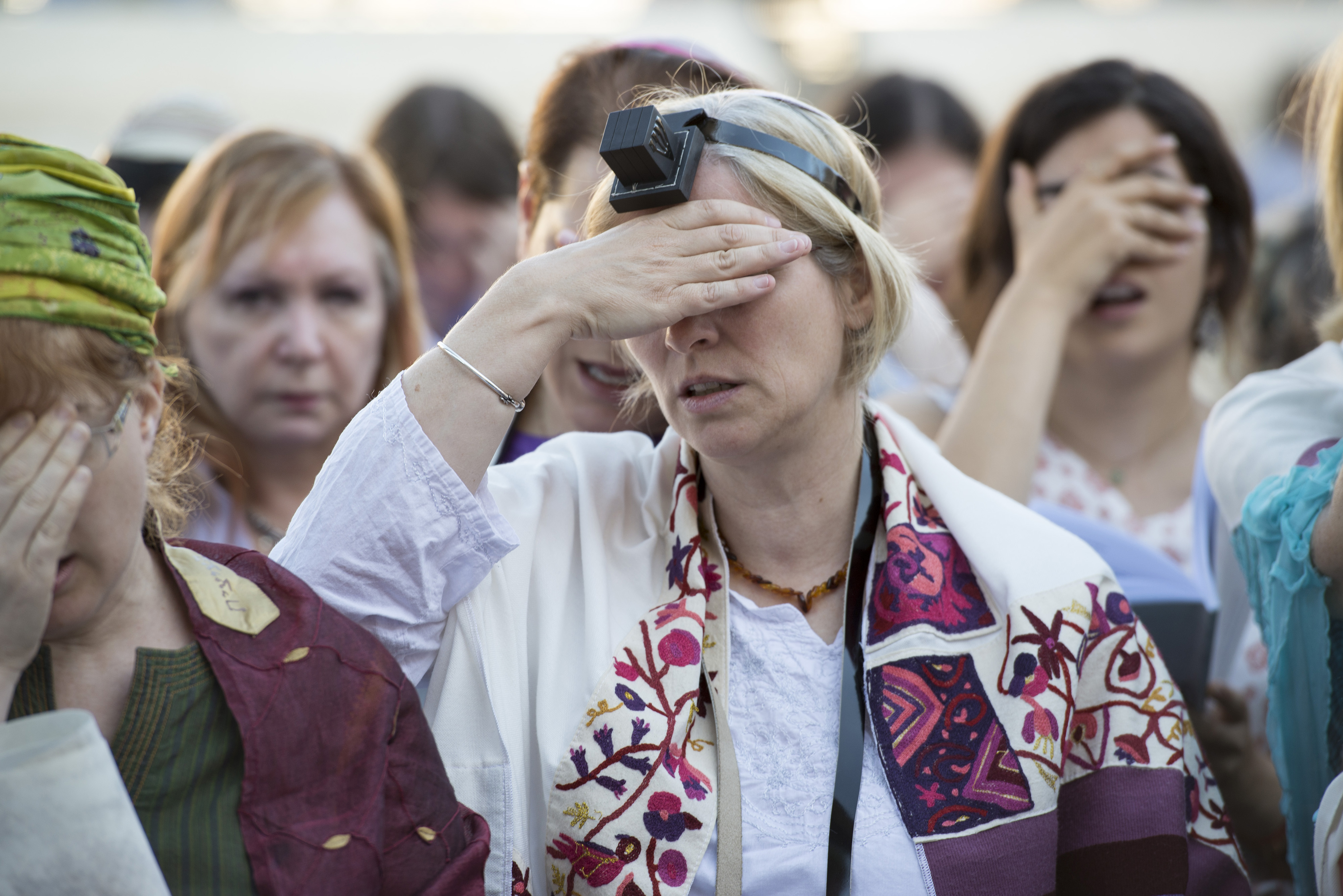
A member of the Women of the Wall prays while wearing tallit and tefillin

Citing Talmudic and later sources, Orthodox feminists allow the laying of tefillin by women.

Traditionally in Orthodox Judaism women are considered to be exempt from all positive time-bound mitzvot, such as wrapping tefillin. The medieval halachic work Orach Chayyim precludes women who wish to wear tefillin from doing so. In ancient times, this was not the case. There are several instances of women who allegedly wore tefillin. According to Talmud Yerushalmi Berachot 2:3:9 "Michal the daughter of the Cushite [Saul] wore tefillin and the sages did not protest" — although in the same tractate Rabbi Hezekiah concludes that the sages indeed did prohibit the wearing of phylacteries from Michal. The Mishnah tractate entitled Nashim ("women" or "wives"), which mainly deals with matters relating to domestic life and marriage is one of the most comprehensive dealing with the legal aspects of the role of women in Judaism. Medieval Ashkenazi communities represented a high point in women’s voluntary participation in Judaism, even in aspects supposedly forbidden to them by Talmudic law. Women of Northern France were known to put on tefillin to pray. In addition to tefillin, women were documented as being counted in prayer quorums, and serving as a sandeka'it at circumcision feasts. However, the political and economic situation of European Jewry gradually worsened beginning in the 13th century. In response, communities reverted to more traditional practices, and most of the gains Jewish women had achieved were put to a stop.

== Activities ==
Orthodox Jewish feminists participate in a number of organized and informal activities which both demonstrate their commitment to their values as both feminists and as Orthodox Jews.

Holding conferences of various kinds is a major activity that Orthodox Jewish feminists use to educate, show recognition, and strengthen the movement. JOFA organizes conferences for its members and the public drawing crowds from both North America, and internationally. As well, some Orthodox feminists participate in partnership minyanim and other independent minyanim where they feel comfortable and are permitted to practice Judaism in their unique way. This phenomenon was the topic of discussion of Mechhon Hadar, a conference about independent minyanim.

=== Communal leadership ===
A new office in some synagogues, particularly of the Open Orthodox movement is allowing women to serve as synagogue or congregational interns, a position traditionally held by men only.

=== Spiritual leadership ===
Blu Greenberg advocates for women to ascend to the Orthodox rabbinate. Mimi Feigelson was an Orthodox student of Shlomo Carlebach who was ordained after his death, but she doesn't use the term 'rabbi' in reference to herself out of respect for Orthodox social structure. Haviva Ner-David has the equivalent of Orthodox ordination, but teaches at a Conservative yeshiva.

Sara Hurwitz is the maharat of the Hebrew Institute of Riverdale. She has the full training of an Orthodox rabbi. Her title is an acronym for Manhiga Hilchatit Ruchanit Toranit: A halakhic spiritual and torah leader. According to Rabbi Avi Weiss, she is a full member of the clergy. A MaHaRaT has functions as spiritual leader, gives pastoral care, and leads life cycle events, as well as having authority to teach Torah. She has the authority to answer questions of Jewish Law.

In some communities, a spiritual leadership position other than rabbi is held by a woman. Dina Najman is ראש קהילה Rosh Kehila (Hebrew: Head of Community) of Kehilat Orach Eliezer (KOE) on Manhattan's Upper West Side.

Sharona Margolin Halickman is a Madricha Ruchanit or Spiritual Mentor of the Hebrew Institute of Riverdale.

Maharat Rachel Kohl Finegold is the Director of Education & Spiritual Enrichment at Congregation Shaar Hashomayim in Montreal and is involved with JOFA.

Lynn Kaye is the equivalent of an associate rabbi at Shearith Israel in Manhattan.

Maharat Ruth Balinsky Friedman is the maharat at The National Synagogue in Washington DC.

Rori Picker Neiss serves as the Director of Programming, Education and Community Engagement at Bais Abraham Congregation in St. Louis, MO.

In 2015 Jennie Rosenfeld became the first female Orthodox spiritual advisor in Israel (specifically, she became the spiritual advisor, also called manhiga ruchanit, for the community of Efrat.) And same year Miriam Gonczarska of Poland, has received maharat smicha as first European.

Australia's Shira Hadasha invited Maharat Melanie Landau to be its spiritual head; however, she declined the role. The community remains lay-led and service leadership and leyning are performed by congregants such as Mandi Katz and Alex Fein.

== See also ==
- Jewish Orthodox Feminist Alliance (JOFA)
- Partnership minyan
- Women rabbis

== Bibliography ==
- Hartman, Tova, Feminism Encounters Traditional Judaism: Resistance and Accommodation. Brandeis, Lebanon, New Hampshire, 2008
