= Women in Judaism =

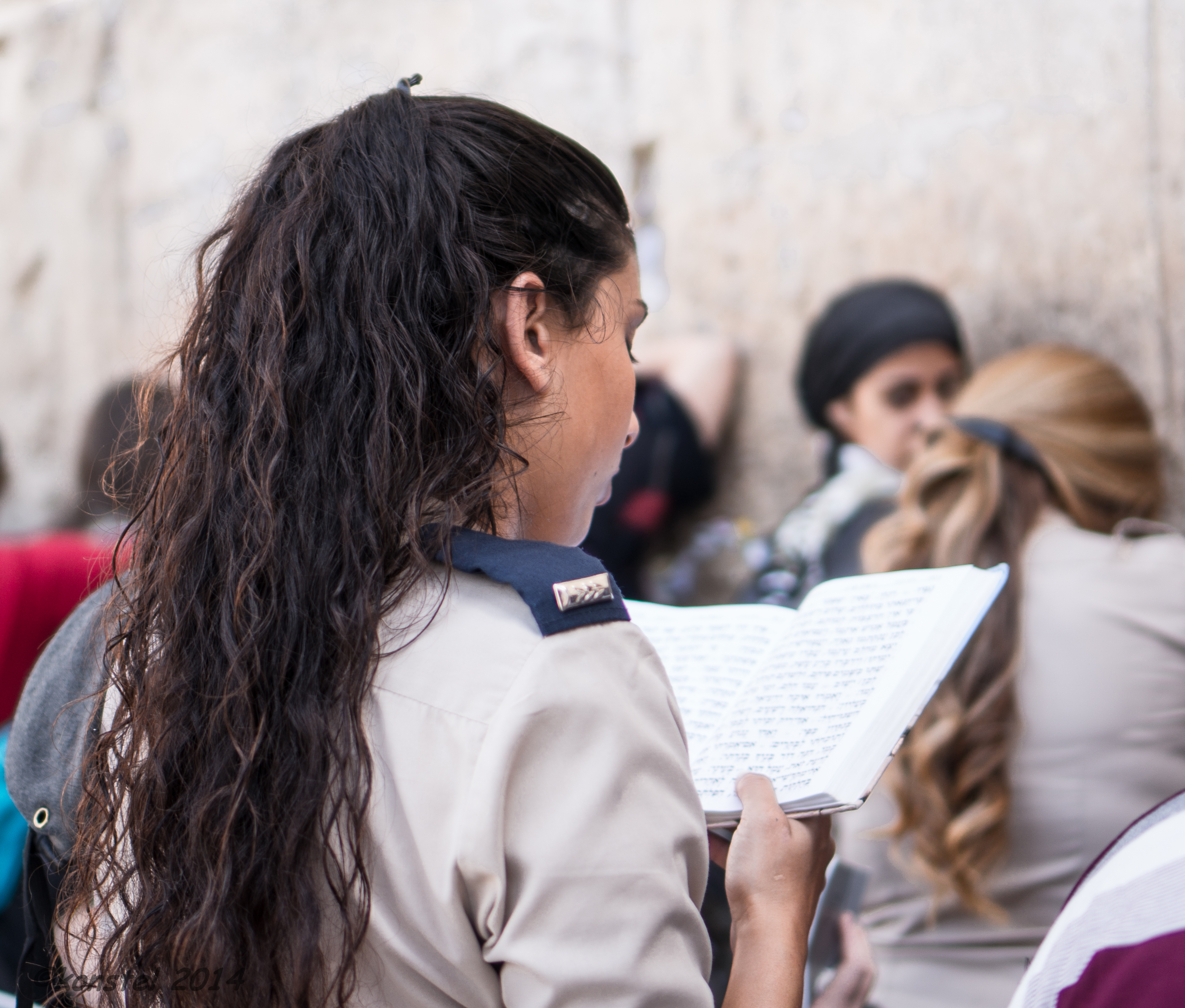
An Israeli officer praying at the Western Wall of the Temple Mount in the Old City of Jerusalem, 2014

Women in Judaism have affected the course of Judaism over millennia. Their role is reflected in the Hebrew Bible, the Oral Law (the corpus of rabbinic literature), by custom, and by cultural factors. Although the Hebrew Bible and rabbinic literature present various female role models, religious law treats women in specific ways. According to a 2017 study by the Pew Research Center, women account for 52% of the worldwide Jewish population.

Gender has a bearing on familial lines: in Rabbinic Judaism, Jewish affiliation is passed down through the mother, although the father's name is used to describe sons and daughters in the Torah and in traditional Hebrew names, e. g., "Dinah, daughter of Jacob".

A growing movement advocates for increased inclusion of women in positions such as rabbis, cantors, and communal leaders. This challenges historic practices. Perspectives on women's roles evolved over time due to discussion and reinterpretation of religious texts.

Levi status (patrilineal descent from the tribe of Levi) is given only to a Jewish male descended patrilineally from Levi; likewise a Kohen descends from Aharon, the first Kohen. Bat-Kohens and Bat-Levis inherit that status from their Jewish father with the corresponding title HaKohen/HaLevi.

== Biblical times ==
Compared to men, relatively few women are mentioned in the Bible by name and role. Those mentioned include the Matriarchs Sarah, Rebecca, Rachel, and Leah; Miriam the prophetess; Rahab who assisted Joshua; Achsah, daughter of Caleb; Deborah the Judge; Naomi; Ruth great-grandmother of King David Huldah the prophetess; Abigail (who married David); Rahab; and Persian Jewish queen Esther. Ruth and Esther are the only women with books that bear their name.

Women are portrayed subverting male-dominated power structures. Many Jewish women are considered foundational by feminists because they provide insights into life during those times. They are notable for breaking the male dominance of historical documentation. This is notable given the poor documentation of most women's lives at the time.

According to Jewish tradition, a covenant was formed between the Israelites and the God of Abraham at Mount Sinai. The Torah relates that Israelite men and women were present at Sinai; however, the covenant bound men to act upon its requirements and to ensure that household members (wives, children, and slaves) also met these requirements. In this sense, the covenant bound women, though indirectly.

Marriage and family law in biblical times gave men powers that it did not give to women. For example, a husband could choose to divorce a wife, but a wife could not divorce a husband without his consent. The practice of levirate marriage applied to widows of childless husbands, but not to widowers of childless wives; though, if either did not consent to the marriage, a ceremony called chalitza was done instead. The widow removes her brother-in-law's shoe, spits in front of him, and proclaims, "This is what happens to someone who will not build his brother's house!"

Laws concerning the loss of female virginity have no male equivalent. Many of these laws, such as levirate marriage, are no longer practiced (chalitzah is practiced instead of levirate marriage). These and other gender differences found in the Torah suggest that biblical society viewed continuity, property, and family unity as paramount; however, they also suggest that women were to be subordinate to men. Men were required to perform specific duties for their wives, but these often reinforced gendered roles. These included the provision of clothing, food, and sexual service to their wives.

Women participated in ritual life. Women were required to make pilgrimage to the Temple in Jerusalem once a year (men should on each of the three main festivals if possible) and offer the Passover sacrifice. They would also do so on special occasions in their lives such as giving a todah ("thanksgiving") offering after childbirth. Hence, they participated in many of the major public religious roles that non-Levitical men could, albeit less often and on a somewhat smaller and more discreet scale.

According to Jewish tradition, Michal, the daughter of Saul and David's first wife, accepted the commandments of tefillin and tzitzit. However, these requirements applied only to men. Many of the mitzvot applied to both men and women; however, women were usually exempt from requirements to perform a duty at a specific time, as opposed to doing so at a convenient time or requirements to abstain from an act). Two prominent theories attempt to explain this: pragmatism (because women's duties consume their time) and spirituality (because "women have superior inherent spiritual wisdom", known as bina, that makes them less dependent than men on religious practices to retain a strong spiritual connection to God).

Women depended on men economically. Women generally did not own property except in the rare case of inheriting land from a father who did not bear sons. Even in such cases, "women would be required to remarry within the tribe so as not to reduce its land holdings".

== Talmudic times ==
Women were required by halacha to carry out all negative mitzvot (i. e., commandments that prohibit activities such as "Thou shalt not commit adultery"), but were excused from doing most time-bound, positive mitzvot (i. e., commandments that prescribe ritual action that must be done at certain times such as hearing a shofar on Rosh Hashanah). A woman was not, however, prohibited from doing a mitzvah from which she was excused. Halacha also provided women with some material and emotional protections related to marriage, and divorce that most non-Jewish women did not enjoy during the first millennium of the Common Era. Penal and civil law treated men and women equally.

Evidence suggests that, at least among the elite, women were educated in the Bible and in halacha. The daughter of a scholar was considered a good prospect for marriage in part because of her education. Stories in the Talmud present women whose husbands died or were exiled and yet were able to educate their children because of their own education.

The Talmud states:

- Greater is the reward to be given by the All-Mighty to the (righteous) women than to (righteous) men.
- Ten measures of speech descended to the world; women took nine.
- Women are light on raw knowledge – i. e., they possess more intuition.
- A man without a wife lives without joy, blessing, and good; a man should love his wife as himself and respect her more than himself.
- When Rav Yosef b. Hiyya heard his mother's footsteps he would say: Let me arise before the approach of the divine presence.
- Israel was redeemed from Egypt by virtue of its (Israel's) righteous women.
- A man must be careful never to speak slightingly to his wife, because women are prone to tears and sensitive to wrong.
- Women have greater faith than men.
- Women have greater powers of discernment.
- Women are especially tenderhearted.

While few women are mentioned by name, and none are known to have authored a rabbinic work, those who are mentioned are portrayed as having a strong influence on their husbands. Occasionally they have a public persona. Examples are Bruriah, the wife of the Tanna Rabbi Meir; Rachel, wife of Rabbi Akiva; Yalta, the wife of Rabbi Nachman; and Ima Shalom, the wife of Eliezer ben Hurcanus. When Eleazar ben Azariah was asked to assume the role of Nasi ("Prince" or President of the Sanhedrin), he replied that he must first take counsel with his wife, which he did.

== Middle Ages ==
Since Jews were seen as second-class citizens in Christian and Muslim societies (legally known in the Muslim world as dhimmi), it was harder for Jewish women to establish their own status. Grossman claimed that three factors affected how Jewish women were perceived by society: "the biblical and Talmudic heritage; the situation in the non-Jewish society within which the Jews lived and functioned; and the economic status of the Jews, including the woman's role in supporting the family." Grossman used these factors to argue that women's status overall during this period rose.

During the Middle Ages, a conflict emerged between Judaism's expectations of women and the reality in which they lived; this was similar to the lives of Christian women of the period. This prompted the kabbalistic work Sefer Hakanah to demand that women fulfill the mitzvot in a way equal to men. In some communities of Ashkenaz in the fifteenth century, the wife of the rabbi wore tzitzit like her husband.

=== Religious life ===
Prohibitions against teaching women Torah eased, and women started to form prayer groups. Women participated in Jewish practices publicly at the synagogue. Women probably learned how to read the liturgy in Hebrew.

Bowker stated that traditionally, "men and women pray separately. This goes back to ancient times when women could go only as far as the second court of the Temple." In most synagogues, women were given an area named Ezrat Nashim, most likely a balcony; some synagogues had a separate building.

Separation from the men was created by the Rabbis in the Mishnah and the Talmud. The reasoning was that a woman and her body would distract men and give them impure thoughts during prayer. Due to this rabbinical interpretation, scholars viewed the women's role in the synagogue as limited and sometimes non-existent. Later research reported that women had a significant role in the synagogue and the community at large. Women usually attended synagogue, for example, on the Shabbat and the holidays.

Depending on the location, women either attended the same service as the men or conducted their own. In larger synagogues, a designated woman who was able to follow the cantor would repeat the prayers for the women. Women had always attended services on Shabbat and holidays, but beginning in the eleventh century, women became more involved in the synagogue and its rituals. Separate seating for women became a norm around the beginning of the thirteenth century. Women, however, did much more than pray. One of their main jobs was to beautify the building. Women sewed Torah ark curtains and Torah covers; some survive. The synagogue was a communal place for both men and women where worship, learning and community activities occurred.

The rise of Kabbalah, which emphasized the shechinah and female aspects of the divine presence and human-divine relationship, and which saw marriage as a holy covenant between partners rather than just a civil contract, had great influence. Kabbalists explained the phenomenon of menstruation as expressions of the demonic or sinful character of the menstruant. These changes were accompanied by increased pietistic strictures, including greater requirements for modest dress, and greater strictures while menstruating. Philosophical and midrashic interpretations depicted women in a negative light, emphasizing a duality between matter and spirit in which femininity was associated, with negative connotations, with earth and matter. Gentile society was seen as a negative influence on the Jewish community. For example, it seems that Jews would analyze the modesty of their Gentile neighbors before officially moving into a new community, because they knew that their children would be influenced by their surroundings. After the expulsion of Jews from Spain in 1492, women became virtually the only source of Jewish ritual and tradition in the Catholic world in a phenomenon known as crypto-Judaism. Crypto-Jewish women slaughtered their own animals, and followed as many of the Jewish dietary laws (Kashrut or kosher) and life cycle rituals as possible without raising suspicion. Occasionally, these women were prosecuted by Inquisition officials for suspicious behavior such as lighting candles to honor the Sabbath or refusing to eat pork. The Inquisition targeted crypto-Jewish women at least as much as it targeted crypto-Jewish men, because women were accused of perpetuating Jewish tradition while men were merely permitting their wives and daughters to organize the household.

=== Domestic life ===
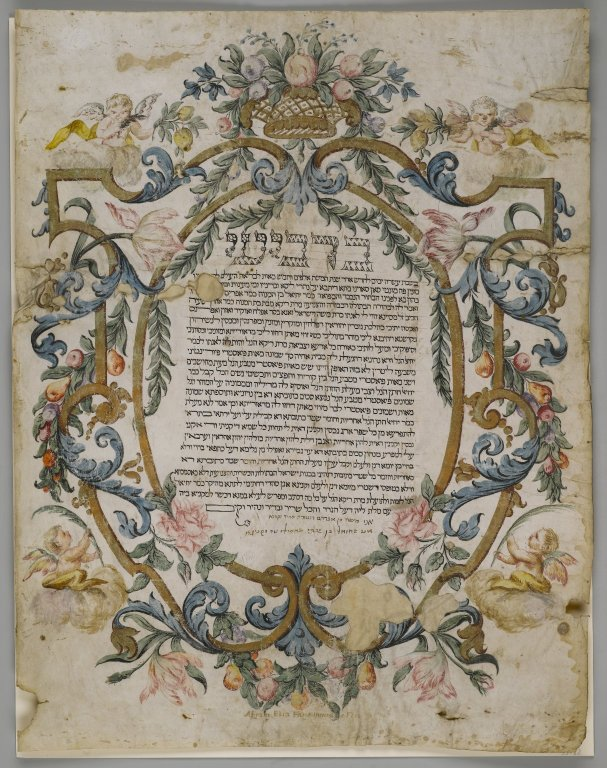
Jewish marriage certificate, dated 1740 (Brooklyn Museum)

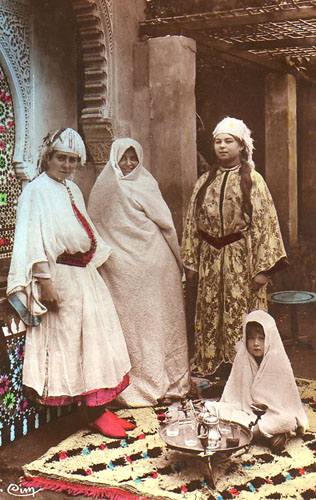
Moroccan Jewish women

Marriage, domestic violence and divorce were discussed by Jewish sages of the Medieval world. Marriage is an important institution in Judaism. The wife/mother is called "akeret habayit" in Hebrew, which in English means "mainstay of the house". In traditional and Orthodox Judaism the akeret habayit tends to the family and household duties.

Rabbeinu Gershom instituted a rabbinic decree (takkanah) prohibiting polygyny among Ashkenazic Jews. At the time, Sephardic and Mizrahi Jews did not accept this ban.

The rabbis instituted legal methods to enable women to petition a rabbinical court to compel a divorce. Maimonides ruled that a woman who found her husband "repugnant" could ask a court to compel a divorce by flogging the recalcitrant husband "because she is not like a captive, to be subjected to intercourse with one who is hateful to her". Furthermore, Maimonides ruled that a woman may "consider herself as divorced and remarry" if her husband remained absent for three years. This was to prevent women married to traveling merchants from becoming an agunah if the husband never returned.

The rabbis instituted and tightened prohibitions on domestic violence. Rabbi Peretz ben Elijah ruled, "The cry of the daughters of our people has been heard concerning the sons of Israel who raise their hands to strike their wives. Yet who has given a husband the authority to beat his wife?" Rabbi Meir of Rothenberg ruled that, "For it is the way of the Gentiles to behave thus, but Heaven forbid that any Jew should do so. And one who beats his wife is to be excommunicated and banned and beaten." He also ruled that a battered wife could petition a rabbinical court to compel a husband to grant a divorce, with a monetary fine owed to her on top of the regular ketubah money. These rulings occurred in the midst of societies where wife-beating was legally sanctioned and routine.

=== Education ===
Jewish women had a limited education. They were taught to read, write, run a household. They were given some education in religious law that was essential to their daily lives, such as keeping kosher. Both Christian and Jewish girls were educated in the home. Although Christian girls might have either a male or female tutor, most Jewish girls had a female tutor. Higher learning was uncommon for women. More sources of education were available for Jewish women in Muslim-controlled lands. Middle Eastern Jewry had an abundance of female literates.

Many women had enough education to help their husbands in business or even run their own. Jewish women seem to have lent money to Christian women throughout Europe. Women also worked as copyists, midwives, spinners, and weavers.

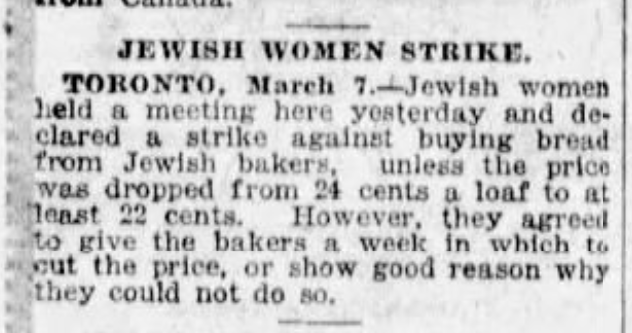
The Montreal Star 07 Mar 1921, Mon · Page 11

== Debates in Jewish law ==
=== Education of women ===
From certain contexts of the Mishnah and Talmud, it can be derived that women should not study Mishnah. Female Tannaitic Torah jurists included Rabbi Meir's wife, Rabbi Meir's daughter, and the daughter of Haninah ben Teradion. Haninah's daughter is mentioned as a sage in the non-Talmudic third-century text Tractate Semahot 12:13. Rabbi Meir's wife is credited with teaching him how to understand some verses from Isaiah. The Mishnah references certain women teaching men the Torah from behind a curtain so that no man would be offended.

However, a yeshiva, or school for Talmudic studies, is an "exclusively masculine environment".

Maimonides tended to elevate the status of women above the then norm. For example, he permitted women to study Torah even though other legal opinions did not. Rabbi Chaim Joseph David Azulai wrote that women should study the Mishnah only if they wanted to. According to the Hida, the prohibition of teaching women does not apply to a motivated woman or girl. Maimonides' response to detractors was the prohibition against teaching Mishnah to any student—male or female—unless they were properly prepared and motivated.

One of the most important Ashkenazi rabbanim of the past century, Yisrael Meir Kagan, known popularly as the "Chofetz Chaim", favored Torah education for girls to counteract the French "finishing schools" prevalent in his day for the daughters of the bourgeoisie.

"It would appear that all [these sexist laws] were intended for earlier generations when everyone dwelt in the place of their familial ancestral home and ancestral tradition was very powerful among all to follow the path of their fathers... under such circumstances we could maintain that a woman not study Mishnayos and, for guidance, rely on her righteous parents, but presently, due to our myriad sins, ancestral tradition has become exceptionally weak and it is common that people do not dwell in proximity to the family home, and especially those women who devote themselves to mastering the vernacular, surely it is a now a great mitzvah to teach them Scripture and the ethical teachings of our sages such as Pirkei Avos, Menoras Ha-Ma'or and the like so that they will internalize our sacred faith because [if we do not do so] they are prone to abandon the path of God and violate all principles of [our] faith."

Joseph Soloveitchik

Rabbi Joseph B. Soloveitchik taught that all religious Ashkenazi Jews, except hardline Hasidim, must teach their girls Gemarah like the boys: "The halakha prohibiting Torah study for women is not indiscriminate or all-encompassing. ... 'If ever circumstances dictate that study of Torah sh-Ba'al Peh is necessary to provide a firm foundation for faith, such study becomes obligatory and obviously lies beyond the pale of any prohibition.' Undoubtedly, the Rav's prescription was more far-reaching than that of the Hafets Hayim and others. But the difference in magnitude should not obscure their fundamental agreement [on changing the attitudes Halachically]."

== Present day ==
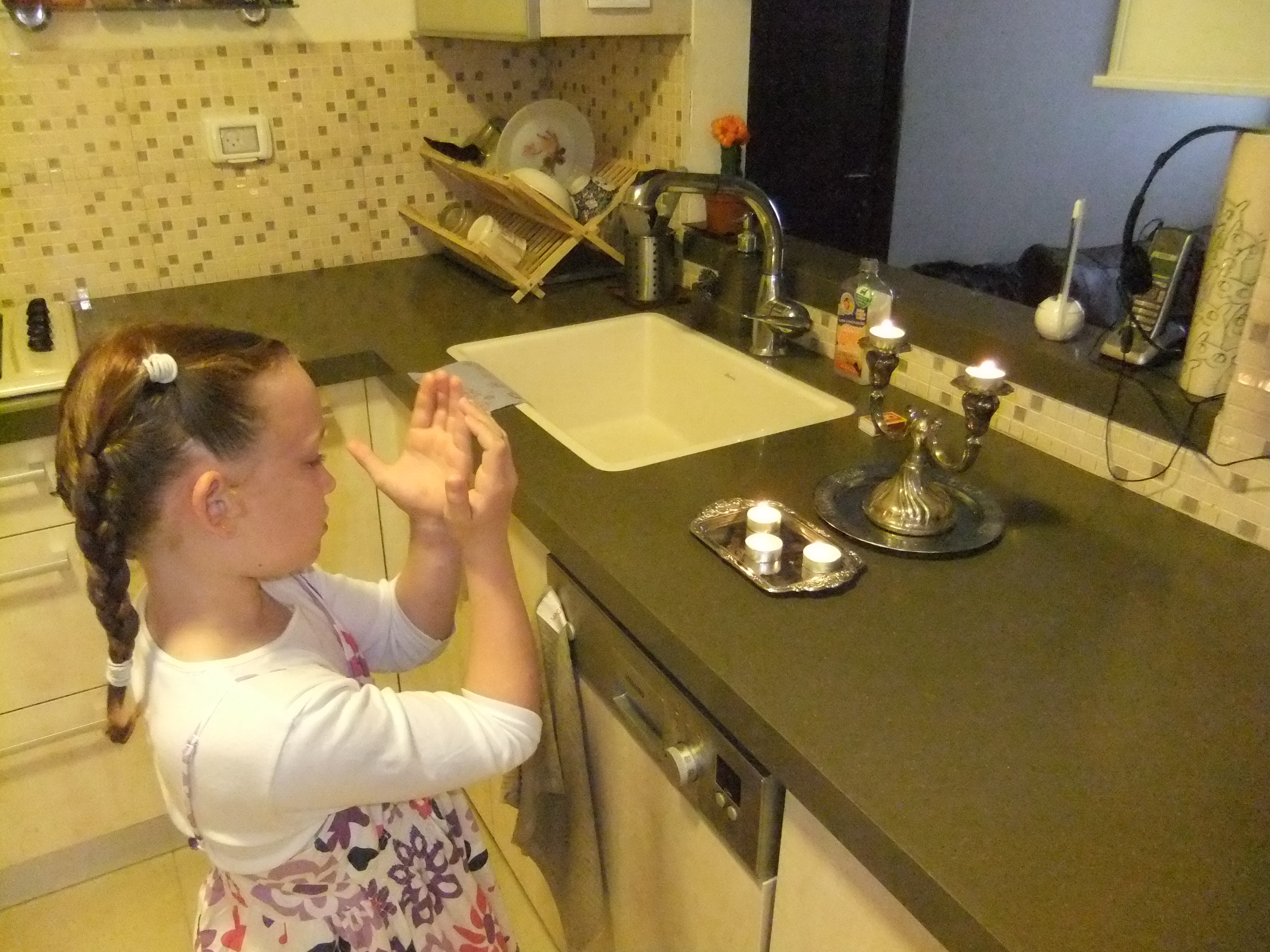
Girl lights Shabbat candles

=== Orthodox Judaism ===
Orthodox Judaism is complementarian. Opinions vary among Orthodox Jews concerning these principles. Most claim that men and women have different roles and bear different obligations. For example, women are not burdened with time-bound mitzvot. Others believe that such differences have cultural, social, and historical causes. Women were historically exempted from religious study beyond understanding the practical aspects of Torah and the practices necessary for running a devout household—both of which they were obligated to learn. Until the twentieth century, women were often discouraged from learning Talmud and other advanced Jewish texts. In the past 100 years, Orthodox Jewish education for women has expanded. This is most visible in the development of the Bais Yaakov system.

Orthodox women have been working to expand women's learning and scholarship, promoting women's ritual inclusion in worship and promoting women's communal and religious leadership. Some rabbinic leaders oppose such changes, claiming that women are motivated by sociological reasons rather than religion. For example, Orthodox rabbis discourage women from wearing a kippah, tallit, or tefillin.

In many Orthodox synagogues, women are not entitled to deliver divrei Torah—brief discourses on the weekly Torah portion—after or between services; shiurim are typically limited to men. Orthodox synagogues have physical barriers (mechitzot) dividing the left and right sides of the synagogue, with the women on one side and the men on the other. Historically, many Orthodox synagogues restricted women to balcony seating while men sat on the main floor. Formally, a mechitzah of over four feet or so (ten handbreadths) suffices, even if the men can see the women, though such a small separation is not ideal. A typical mechitzah consists of wheeled wooden panels, often topped with one-way glass to allow women to view the Torah reading.

==== Rules of modesty ====
Although Judaism prescribes modesty for both men and women, the importance of modesty in dress and conduct is particularly stressed among women and girls. Most Orthodox women wear skirts and avoid trousers, and most married Orthodox women cover their hair with a scarf (tichel), snood, hat, beret, or wig.

==== Halakhic advisor ====
Under Jewish Law, Orthodox Jewish women refrain from bodily contact with their husbands while they are menstruating and for 7 days afterwards, and after the birth of a child. The Israeli Rabbinate allows women to act as yoatzot, halakhic advisers on matters considered sensitive and personal such as niddah.

==== Modern Orthodox ====
Orthodox leader Rabbi Joseph B. Soloveitchik discouraged women from serving as presidents of synagogues or other official leadership positions, from performing other mitzvot traditionally performed by males exclusively, such as wearing a tallit or tefillin. One reason is that tefillin are believed to help men avoid thoughts considered impure, while women are believed not to have such thoughts. Soloveitchik wrote that while women do not lack the capability to perform such acts, there is no mesorah (Jewish tradition) that permits it. In making his decision, he relied upon Jewish oral law, including a mishnah in Chulin 2a and a Beit Yoseph in the Tur Yoreh Deah stating that a woman can perform a specific official communal service for her own needs, but not those of others.

Women's issues garnered more interest with the advent of feminism. Many Modern Orthodox Jewish women and Modern Orthodox rabbis sought to provide more Jewish education for women. Modern Orthodox communities promote women's secular education. A few Modern Orthodox Synagogues have women serving as clergy, including Gilah Kletenik at Congregation Kehilath Jeshurun.

In 2010, Sara Hurwitz became the first woman to be ordained as a "Rabba", the female equivalent of a rabbi, when she started serving as an Open Orthodox spiritual leader.

In 2013, Yeshivat Maharat, located in the United States, became the first Orthodox institution to consecrate female clergy. The graduates of Yeshivat Maharat typically receive the title maharat rather than rabbi. However, in 2015, Yaffa Epstein was ordained as a rabba by the institution. Also in 2015, Lila Kagedan was ordained as a rabbi at Yeshivat Maharat, the seminary's first graduate to take the title. She became the first female Modern Orthodox rabbi in the US in January 2016.

In 2013, Malka Schaps became the first female Haredi dean at an Israeli university when she was appointed dean of Bar Ilan University's Faculty of Exact Sciences. Also in 2013, the first class of female halachic advisers in the US graduated from the North American branch of Nishmat's yoetzet halacha program. SAR High School began allowing girls to wrap tefillin during Shacharit (morning prayer) in an all-female prayer group, the first Modern Orthodox high school in the US to do so.

In 2014, the first-ever book of halachic decisions was published by women ordained to serve as poskot (Idit Bartov and Anat Novoselsky) in Israel. They were ordained by Rabbi Shlomo Riskin after completing Midreshet Lindenbaum's women's course and passing examinations equivalent to the rabbinate's requirement for men.

On June 10, 2015, Meesh Hammer-Kossoy and Rahel Berkovits were the first women ordained as Modern Orthodox rabbas in Israel.

In the fall, the Agudath Israel of America denounced moves to ordain women, and declared Yeshivat Maharat, Yeshivat Chovevei Torah, and Open Orthodoxy, in general, as having rejected basic tenets of Judaism. The Rabbinical Council of America passed a resolution which stated, "RCA members with positions in Orthodox institutions may not ordain women into the Orthodox rabbinate, regardless of the title used; or hire or ratify the hiring of a woman into a rabbinic position at an Orthodox institution; or allow a title implying rabbinic ordination to be used by a teacher of Limudei Kodesh in an Orthodox institution."

Also in 2015, Jennie Rosenfeld became the first female Orthodox spiritual advisor in Israel.

In 2016 Ephraim Mirvis created the job of ma'ayan by which women would be advisers on Jewish law in the area of family purity and as adult educators in Orthodox synagogues. This required a part-time training course for 18 months, the first such course in the United Kingdom. On August 23, 2016, Karmit Feintuch became the first woman in Jerusalem to be hired as a Modern Orthodox "rabbanit" and serve as a spiritual leader.

In 2017, the Orthodox Union adopted a policy banning women from serving as clergy, from holding titles such as "rabbi", and from performing common clergy functions even without a title, in its US congregations.

==== Women's prayer groups ====
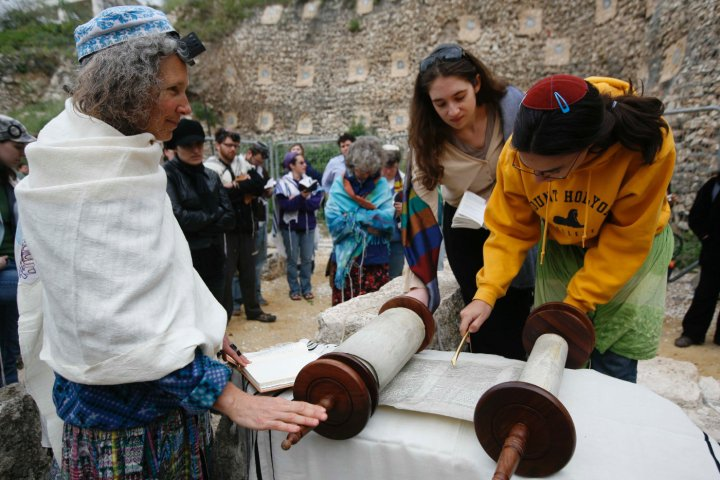
Torah Reading at Robinson's Arch

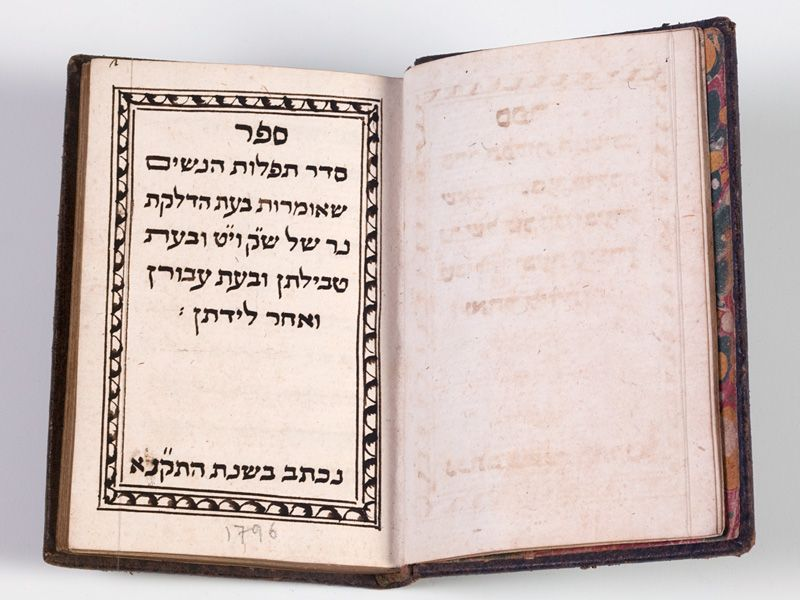
Hebrew manuscript containing prayers for women, Italy 1791. In the collection of the Jewish Museum of Switzerland.

In Germany, in the twelfth and thirteenth centuries, women's prayer groups were led by female cantors. Rabbi Eliezer of Worms, in his elegy for his wife Dulca, praised her for teaching the other women how to pray and embellishing the prayer with music. The gravestone of Urania of Worms, who died in 1275, contains the inscription "who sang piyyutim for the women with musical voice". In the Nurnberg Memorial Book, one Richenza was inscribed with the title "prayer leader of the women".

Orthodox women more recently began holding organized women's tefila (prayer) groups beginning in the 1970s. While Orthodox legal authorities agree that women are prohibited from forming a minyan (prayer quorum) for the purpose of regular services, women in these groups have read the prayers and study Torah. A number of leaders from all segments of Orthodox Judaism have commented on this issue, but it has had a little, although growing, impact on Haredi and Sephardi Judaism. However, the emergence of this phenomenon has enmeshed Modern Orthodox Judaism in a debate which still continues today. There are three schools of thought on this issue:

- The most restrictive view, held by a few rabbis, rules that all women's prayer groups are absolutely forbidden by halakha (Jewish law).
- A more liberal, permissive view maintains that women's prayer groups can be compatible with halakha, but only if they do not carry out a full prayer service (i. e., do not include certain parts of the service known as devarim shebikedusha that require a minyan; for example the recital of Kaddish or reading from the Torah), and only if services are spiritually and sincerely motivated, as is usually the case; they cannot be sanctioned if they are inspired by a desire to rebel against halakha. People in this group include Rabbi Avraham Elkana Shapiro, former British Chief Rabbi Immanuel Jakobovits, and Rabbi Avi Weiss. This is the generally followed view.
- A third view argues in favor of the acceptability of calling women to the Torah in mixed services, and leading certain parts of the service which do not require a minyan, under certain conditions.

In 2013, the Israeli Orthodox rabbinical organization Beit Hillel issued a halachic ruling which allows women, for the first time, to say the Kaddish prayer in memory of their deceased parents.

==== Women as witnesses ====
Traditionally, women are not generally permitted to serve as witnesses in an Orthodox Beit Din (rabbinical court), although they have recently been permitted to serve as toanot (advocates) in those courts. Women are also permitted to provide evidence under oath, and their statements are considered to be fully credible in ritual matters. The exclusion of women as witnesses has exceptions which have required exploration under rabbinic law, as the role of women in society and the obligations of religious groups under external civil law have been subject to increasing recent scrutiny.

The recent case of Rabbi Mordecai Tendler, the first rabbi to be expelled from the Rabbinical Council of America following allegations of sexual harassment, illustrated the importance of clarification of Orthodox halakha in this area. Rabbi Tendler claimed that the tradition of exclusion of women's testimony should compel the RCA to disregard the allegations. He argued that since the testimony of a woman could not be admitted in Rabbinical court, there were no valid witnesses against him, and hence, the case for his expulsion had to be thrown out for lack of evidence. In a ruling of importance for Orthodox women's capacity for legal self-protection under Jewish law, Haredi Rabbi Benzion Wosner, writing on behalf of the Shevet Levi Beit Din (Rabbinical court) of Monsey, New York, identified sexual harassment cases as coming under a class of exceptions to the traditional exclusion, under which "even children or women" have not only a right, but an obligation, to testify, and can be relied upon by a rabbinical court as valid witnesses:

The Ramah in Choshen Mishpat (Siman 35, 14) rules that in a case where only women congregate, or in a case where only women could possibly testify (in this case, the alleged harassment occurred behind closed doors), they can, and should, certainly testify. (Terumas Hadeshen Siman 353 and Agudah Perek 10, Yochasin)

This is also the ruling of the Maharik, Radvaz, and the Mahar"i of Minz. Even those Poskim that would normally not rely on women witnesses, they would certainly agree that in our case ... where there is ample evidence that this Rabbi violated Torah precepts, then even children or women can certainly be kosher as witnesses, as the Chasam Sofer pointed out in his sefer (monograph) (Orach Chaim T'shuvah 11)

The Rabbinical Council of America, while initially relying on its own investigation, chose to rely on the Halakhic ruling of the Haredi Rabbinical body as authoritative in the situation.

==== Orthodox approaches to change ====
Leaders of the Haredi community have opposed many changes to the role of women. Many have argued that religious and social constraints on women are timeless, and are not subject to change. Many have argued that giving traditionally male roles to women would detract from both women's and men's ability to lead fulfilling lives. Haredim have perceived arguments for liberalization as stemming from antagonism to Jewish law and beliefs.

More liberal variants of Modern Orthodox Judaism tend to view proposed changes in the role of women on a case-by-case basis, focusing on arguments regarding the religious and legal role of specific prayers, rituals and activities individually. Such arguments focus on cases where the Talmud and other traditional sources express multiple or more liberal viewpoints, particularly where the role of women in the past was arguably broader than in later times. Feminist advocates within Orthodoxy generally stay within the traditional legal process of argumentation, seeking a gradualist approach. Nevertheless, a growing Orthodox feminist movement seeks to address gender inequalities.

=== Military service in Israel ===
In modern Israel, the question of women's military service has been a central social and religious issue. While the Israel Defense Forces conscript women as part of mandatory service, religious authorities differ on the permissibility of such enlistment, with many encouraging alternative frameworks of national or community service. Organizations such as Aluma assist young religious women in navigating options for military or civilian service while maintaining their religious commitments.

=== Agunot ===
Agunot (Hebrew: "chained women") are women whose husbands refuse to give them a divorce contract (a "get"). The word can also refer to a woman whose husband has disappeared. In Orthodox Judaism, only a man is able to serve a "get". In order to prevent a husband from such a refusal, many couples sign a prenuptial agreement that forces the husband to serve a get or else be reported to the Jewish court.

=== Conservative Judaism ===
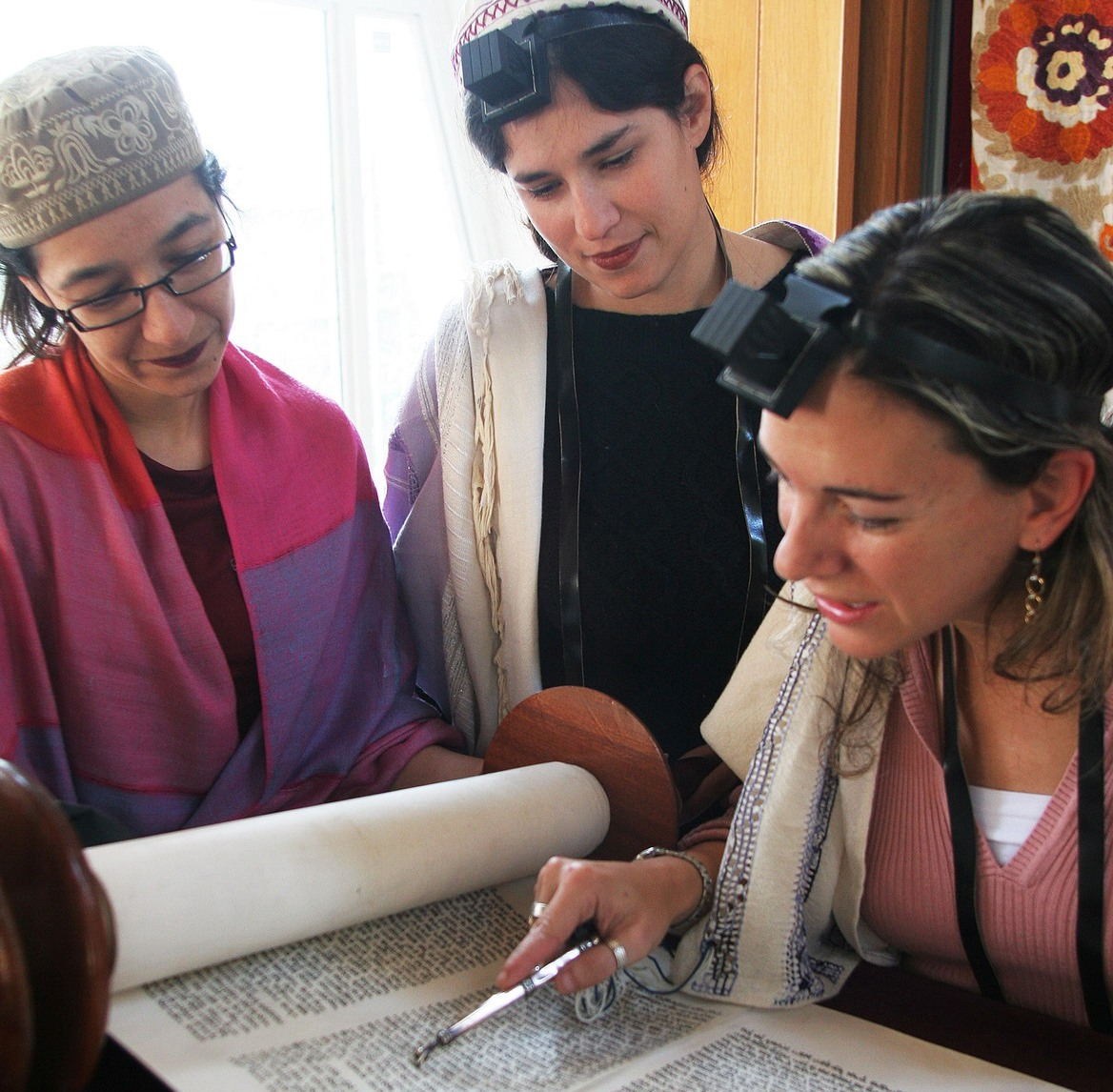
Rabot - Torah

Although the position of Conservative Judaism toward women originally differed little from the Orthodox position, it later minimized legal and ritual differences between men and women. The Committee on Jewish Law and Standards (CJLS) of the Rabbinical Assembly issued decisions and responsa on this topic. These provide for women's active participation in areas such as:

- Publicly reading the Torah (ba'al kriah)
- Being counted as part of a minyan
- Being called for an aliyah to read the Torah
- Serving as a cantor (shaliach tzibbur)
- Serving as rabbi and halakhic decisor (posek - an arbiter in matters of religious law)
- Wearing a tallit and tefillin

A rabbi may decide which particular rulings to adopt for the congregation; thus, some Conservative congregations became more or less egalitarian than others.

Areas where legal differences remain between men and women include:

- Matrilineal descent. The child of a Jewish mother is born Jewish; the child of a Jewish father is born Jewish if and only if the mother is Jewish.
- Pidyon Ha-Bat, a proposed ceremony based on the biblical redemption of the eldest newborn son (Pidyon Ha-Ben). CJLS stated that this ceremony should not be performed for women. Other ceremonies, such as a Simchat Bat (welcoming a newborn daughter), should instead be used.

A Conservative Jewish ketuba includes a clause that puts a husband and wife on more equal footing when it comes to marriage and divorce law within halacha.

CJLS reaffirmed in 2006 the obligation of Conservative women to observe niddah (sexual abstinence during and after menstruation) and mikvah (ritual immersion) following menstruation, although liberalizing certain details. Such practices, while requirements of Conservative Judaism, are not widely observed among Conservative laity.

==== Changes ====
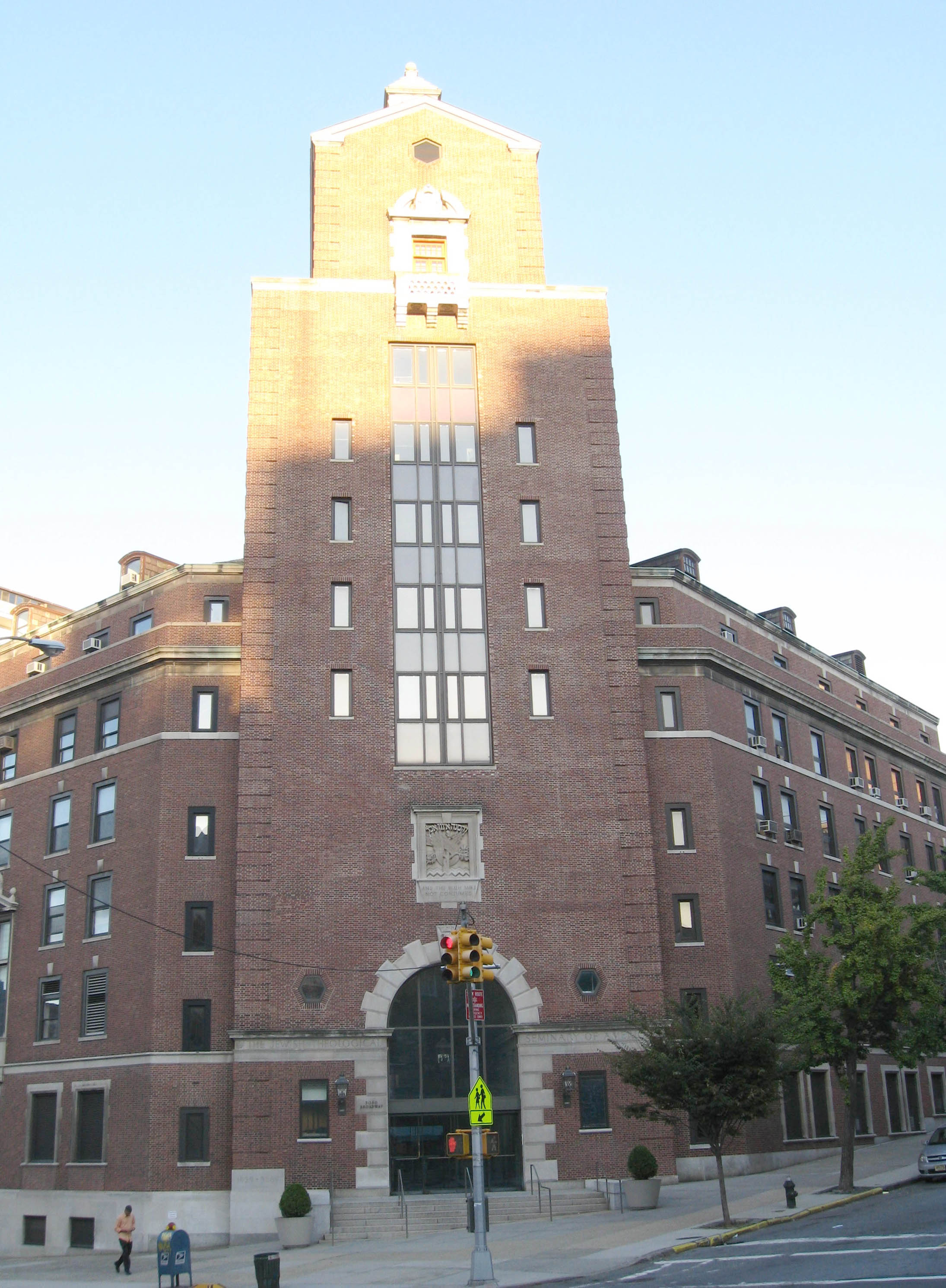
JTS building at 3080 Broadway in Manhattan

Conservative Judaism traditionally held traditional views of women's role. However, in 1946, the new Silverman siddur changed the traditional words of thanking God for "not making me a woman", instead thanking God for "making me a free person." In 1955, the CJLS of the Rabbinical Assembly allowed women to have an aliyah at Torah-readings services.

In 1973, the CJLS of the Rabbinical Assembly voted, without issuing an opinion, that women could count in a minyan.

A commission appointed by the Conservative movement to study the issue of ordaining women as rabbis, met between 1977 and 1978. It consisted of eleven men and three women: attorney Marian Siner Gordon, Assyriologist Rivkah Harris, and author Francine Klagsbrun. In 1983, the Jewish Theological Seminary of America (JTSA) faculty voted, also without accompanying opinion, to ordain women as rabbis and as cantors. Paula Hyman, among others, voted as a member of the JTSA faculty.

In 2002, the CJLS adapted a responsum by Rabbi David Fine, Women and the Minyan, which provided a religious-law foundation for women counting in a minyan and explained the Conservative approach to the role of women in prayer. It holds that although Jewish women do not traditionally have the same obligations as men, Conservative women have voluntarily undertaken them. Because of this undertaking, Fine's responsum claimed that Conservative women are eligible to serve as agents and decision-makers for others. The responsum also held that traditionally-minded communities and individual women could opt out without sinning. By adopting this responsum, the CJLS allowed itself to provide a considered Jewish-law justification for its practices, without having to rely on ad hoc arguments, undermine the religious importance of community and clergy, ask individual women intrusive questions, repudiate the halakhic tradition, or label women as sinners who followed traditional practices.

In 2006, the CJLS adopted three responsa on the subject of niddah, which reaffirmed the obligation of Conservative women to abstain from sexual relations during and following menstruation and to immerse in a mikvah prior to resumption, while liberalizing observance requirements including shortening the length of the niddah, lifting restrictions on non-sexual contact during niddah, and reducing the circumstances under which spotting and similar conditions would mandate abstinence.

Continuing the Orthodox approach remained acceptable. Individual Conservative rabbis and synagogues were not required to change, and a small number did not.

==== Conservative approaches to change ====
Between 1973 and 2002, the Conservative movement adopted changes through its official organizations, but without issuing explanatory opinions. Since 2002, the Conservative movement coalesced around a unified approach to the role of women.

In 1973, 1983, and 1993, individual rabbis and professors issued six major opinions that influenced the Conservative approach, the first and second Sigal, Blumenthal, Rabinowitz, and Roth responsa, and the Hauptman article. These opinions sought to launch a wholesale shift in women's public roles through a comprehensive legal justification. Most such opinions proposed that Jewish women always were, or had become, legally obligated to perform many of the same mitzvot as men and, when performing mitzvot, to do so in the same manner.

The first Sigal and the Blumenthal responsa were considered by CJLS as part of its decision on prayer roles in 1973. They argued that women had always had the same obligations as men. The first Sigal responsum used the Talmud's general prayer obligation and examples of cases in which women were traditionally obligated to say specific prayers. They inferred from them a public prayer obligation identical to that of men. The Blumenthal responsum extrapolated from a minority authority that a minyan could be formed with nine men and one woman in an emergency. CJLS declined to adopt either responsum. Rabbi Sigal reported to the Rabbinical Assembly membership that many on the CJLS, while agreeing with the result, found the arguments unconvincing.

The Rabinowitz, Roth, and second Sigal responsa were considered by JTSA faculty as part of its decision to ordain women as rabbis in 1983. The Rabbinowitz responsum sidestepped the issue of obligation, arguing that a community representative was no longer needed in prayer and hence the question of whether a woman can perform halakhic was moot. CJLS stated that an argument potentially undermining the value of community and clergy was unconvincing: "We should not be afraid to recognize that the function of clergy is to help our people connect with the holy." The Roth and second Sigal responsa accepted that time-bound mitzvot were traditionally optional for women, but argued that women in modern times could change their traditional roles. The Roth responsum argued that women could voluntarily assume the same obligations as men, and that women who do so (e. g., pray three times a day regularly) could count in a minyan and serve as agents. JTSA accordingly required female rabbinical students wishing to train as rabbis to personally obligate themselves. Synagogue rabbis, unwilling to inquire into individual religiosity, found this impractical. The second Sigal responsum called for a takkanah, or rabbinical edict, "that would serve as a halakhic ERA", overruling all non-egalitarian provisions in law or, in the alternative, adopet an approach to halakhic interpretation independent of legal precedents. CJLS, unwilling to take either an intrusive approach or repudiate the traditional legal process, did not adopt either and let the JTS faculty vote stand unexplained.

In 1993, Professor Judith Hauptman of JTSA issued an influential paper arguing that women had historically always been obligated in prayer, using more detailed arguments than the Blumenthal and first Sigal responsa. The paper suggested that women who followed traditional practices were failing to meet their obligations. Rabbi Roth argued that Conservative Judaism should reconsider before adopting a stance that labeled its most traditional members as sinners. The issue was again dropped.

In 2002, the CJLS returned to the issue and adopted a single authoritative approach, the Fine responsum, as the definitive Conservative halakha on role-of-women issues. This responsum held that although Jewish women do not traditionally have the same obligations as men, Conservative women have collectively and voluntarily undertaken them. Because of this, the Fine responsum held that Conservative women were eligible to serve as agents and decision-makers for others. The Responsum also held that traditionally minded communities and individuals could continue traditional practice without sinning. By adopting this Responsum, CJLS was able to provide a considered Jewish-law justification for its egalitarian practices, without having to rely on potentially unconvincing arguments, undermine the religious importance of community and clergy, ask individual women intrusive questions, repudiate the halakhic tradition, or label women following traditional practices as sinners.

=== Reform Judaism ===
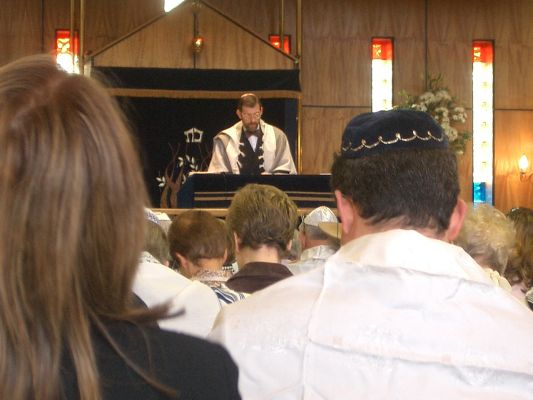
Contemporary Reform service, with some congregants wearing head coverings and prayer shawls

Reform Judaism believes in the equality of men and women. It rejects the idea that halakha is the sole legitimate form of Jewish decisionmaking, and holds that Jews must consider their conscience and ethical principles inherent in the Jewish tradition when deciding upon a right course of action. Consensus is widespread among Reform Jews that traditional distinctions between the role of men and women violate the deeper ethical principles of Judaism. This has enabled Reform communities to allow women to perform many rituals traditionally reserved for men, such as:

- Publicly reading the Torah w(ba'al kriah)
- Being part of the minyan
- Being called for an aliyah to read the Torah
- Serving as a cantor (shalich tzibbur)
- Serving as rabbi and halakhic decisor (posek)
- Wearing a tallit and tefillin

Concerns about intermarriage influenced the Reform Jewish position on gender. In 1983, the Central Conference of American Rabbis passed a resolution waiving the need for formal conversion for anyone with at least one Jewish parent who has made affirmative acts of Jewish identity. The 1983 resolution had a mixed reception in Reform Jewish communities outside of the United States. Most notably, the Israel Movement for Progressive Judaism rejected patrilineal descent and requires formal conversion for anyone whose mother is not Jewish. A jointBet Din composed of Orthodox, Traditional, Conservative, and Reform rabbis, established in Denver, Colorado to promote uniform conversion standards, dissolved in 1983 due to that resolution.. In 2015, the majority of Britain's Assembly of Reform Rabbis voted in favor of a position paper proposing "that individuals who live a Jewish life, and who are patrilineally Jewish, can be welcomed into the Jewish community and confirmed as Jewish through an individual process". Britain's Assembly of Reform Rabbis stated that rabbis "would be able to take local decisions – ratified by the Beit Din – confirming Jewish status".

Reform prayerbooks tend to avoid male-specific words and pronouns, making all references to God in translations in gender-neutral language. For example, the UK Liberal movement's Siddur Lev Chadash (1995) does so, as does the UK Reform Movement's Forms of Prayer (2008). In Mishkan T'filah, the American Reform Jewish prayer book released in 2007, references to God as "He" have been removed, and whenever Jewish patriarchs are named (Abraham, Isaac, and Jacob), so also are the matriarchs (Sarah, Rebecca, Rachel, and Leah.) In 2015 the Reform Jewish High Holy Days prayer book Mishkan HaNefesh was released as a companion to Mishkan T'filah. It includes a version of the High Holy Days prayer Avinu Malkeinu that refers to God as both "Loving Father" and "Compassionate Mother". Other notable changes replaced a line from the Reform movement's earlier prayerbook, "Gates of Repentance", that mentioned the joy of a bride and groom specifically, with the line "rejoicing with couples under the chuppah" (wedding canpopy), and adding a third, non-gendered option to the way worshippers are called to the Torah, offering mibeit (from the house of), in addition to the traditional "son of" or "daughter of".

In 2008, Stacy Offner became the first female vice president of the Union for Reform Judaism. In 2015, Daryl Messinger became the first female Union chair.

==== Reform approaches to change ====
Reform Judaism generally holds that the various differences between the roles of men and women in traditional Jewish law are not relevant to modern conditions and no longer applicable. Accordingly, legal arguments were not needed.

=== Reconstructionist Judaism ===
The equality of women and men is a central tenet and hallmark of Reconstructionist Judaism. From the beginning, Reconstructionist Jewish ritual allowed men and women to pray together. It was on this basis that Rabbi Mordecai Kaplan called for the full equality of women and men, despite the obvious difficulties reconciling this stance with traditional Jewish practice. The Reconstructionist Movement always allowed women to be ordained. In 1968, women were accepted into the Reconstructionist Rabbinical College, under Ira Eisenstein's leadership. The first ordained female Reconstructionist rabbi, Sandy Eisenberg Sasso, served as rabbi of the Manhattan Reconstructionist Congregation in 1976, and gained a pulpit in 1977 at Beth El Zedeck congregation in Indianapolis. Sandy Eisenberg Sasso was accepted without debate or subsequent controversy. In 2005, 24 of the movement's 106 synagogues in the US had women as senior or assistant rabbis. In 2013 Rabbi Deborah Waxman was elected as the President of the Reconstructionist Rabbinical College. She was the first woman and first lesbian to officially to lead a Jewish congregational union, and the first female rabbi and first lesbian to lead a Jewish seminary; the Reconstructionist Rabbinical College is both a congregational union and a seminary.

The Reconstructionist Community began including women in the minyan and allowing them to come up to the Torah for aliyot. They also continued the practice of bat mitzvah. Reconstructionist Judaism allowed women to perform other traditionally male tasks, such as serving as witnesses, leading services, public Torah reading, and wearing ritual prayer garments like kippot and tallitot. Female Reconstructionist rabbis were instrumental in the creation of rituals, stories, and music that give women a voice in Judaism. Most of the focus has been on rituals for life-cycle events. New ceremonies have been created for births, weddings, divorces, conversions, weaning, and the onset of menarche and menopause. The Reconstructionist movement committed to creating liturgy that supports gender equality and the celebration of women's lives. Another major step: The Federation of Reconstructionist Congregations developed educational programs that teach the full acceptance of lesbians, as well as rituals that affirm lesbian relationships. Reconstructionist rabbis officiate at same-sex weddings. Reconstructionist Judaism allows openly LGBT people to be ordained as rabbis and cantors.

Prominent members of the Reconstructionist community focused on issues such as domestic violence. Others devoted energy to helping women gain the right of divorce in traditional Jewish communities. Many have spoken out for the right of Jewish women to pray aloud and read from the Torah at the Western Wall in Jerusalem, particularly members of the Women of the Wall group.

When the roles of women in religion change, men's roles may also change. With their acceptance of patrilineal descent in 1979, the Reconstructionist Rabbinical Association supported the principle that a man can pass Judaism on to the next generation as well as a woman.

=== Jewish Renewal ===
Jewish Renewal describes itself as "a worldwide, transdenominational movement grounded in Judaism's prophetic and mystical traditions". The Jewish Renewal movement ordains women and men as rabbis and cantors. Lynn Gottlieb became the first female rabbi in Jewish Renewal in 1981, and Avitall Gerstetter became the first female cantor in Jewish Renewal (and the first female cantor in Germany) in 2002. In 2009 and 2012 respectively, OHALAH (Association of Rabbis for Jewish Renewal) issued a board statement and a resolution supporting Women of the Wall. OHALAH's Statement of Principles states, "Our local communities will embody egalitarian and inclusive values, manifested in a variety of leadership and decision-making structures, ensuring that women and men are full and equal partners in every aspect of our communal Jewish life." In 2014 OHALAH issued a board resolution stating, "Therefore, be it resolved that: OHALAH supports the observance of Women's History Month, International Women's Day, and Women's Equality Day; OHALAH condemns all types of sexism; OHALAH is committed to gender equality, now and in all generations to come; and OHALAH supports equal rights regardless of gender." Also in 2014, ALEPH: Alliance for Jewish Renewal issued a statement stating, "ALEPH: Alliance for Jewish Renewal supports the observance of Women's History Month, International Women's Day, and Women's Equality Day, condemns all types of sexism, is committed to gender equality, now and in all generations to come, and supports equal rights regardless of gender, in recognition and allegiance to the view that we are all equally created in the Divine Image."

=== Humanistic Judaism ===
Humanistic Judaism ordains both men and women as rabbis; its first rabbi was a woman, Tamara Kolton, who was ordained in 1999. Its first cantor was also a woman, Deborah Davis, ordained in 2001; Humanistic Judaism later stopped ordaining cantors. The Society for Humanistic Judaism issued a statement in 1996 stating, "We affirm that a woman has the moral right and should have the continuing legal right to decide whether or not to terminate a pregnancy in accordance with her own ethical standards. Because a decision to terminate a pregnancy carries serious, irreversible consequences, it is one to be made with great care and with keen awareness of the complex psychological, emotional, and ethical implications." In 2012, they opposed conscience clauses that allowed religious-affiliated institutions to be exempt from requirements mandating the provision of reproductive healthcare services. In 2013 stated, "Therefore, be it resolved that: The Society for Humanistic Judaism wholeheartedly supports the observance of Women's Equality Day on August 26 to commemorate the anniversary of the passage of the Nineteenth Amendment to the U.S. Constitution allowing women to vote; The Society condemns gender discrimination in all its forms, including restriction of rights, limited access to education, violence, and subjugation; and The Society commits itself to maintain vigilance and speak out in the fight to bring gender equality to our generation and to the generations that follow."

=== Sofrot (scribe) ===
Sofrot is the feminine plural of Sofer. A Sopher, Sopher, Sofer STaM, or Sofer ST"M (Heb: "scribe", סופר סת״ם) is a Jewish scribe who is able and entitled to transcribe Torah scrolls, tefillin and mezuzot, and other religious writings. (ST"M, סת״ם, is an abbreviation for Sefer Torahs, Tefillin, and Mezuzot. The masculine plural of sofer is "sofrim" סופרים).

Forming the basis for the discussion of women becoming sofrot, Talmud Gittin 45b states: "Sifrei Torah, tefillin, and mezuzot written by a heretic, a star-worshipper, a slave, a woman, a minor, a Cuthean, or an apostate Jew, are unfit for ritual use.". As Arba'ah Turim does not include women in its list of those ineligible to write Sifrei Torah, some see this as proof that women are permitted to write a Torah scroll. However, virtually all Orthodox (both Modern and Ultra) authorities reject the idea that a woman is permitted to write a Sefer Torah. Yet women are permitted to inscribe Ketubot (marriage contracts), STaM not intended for ritual use, and other writings of Sofrut beyond simple STaM. In 2003, Canadian Aviel Barclay became the world's first public, traditionally-trained, female sofer. In 2007 Jen Taylor Friedman, a British woman, became the first female sofer to scribe a Sefer Torah. In 2010 the first Sefer Torah scribed by a group of women (six female sofers, from Brazil, Canada, Israel, and the United States) was completed; this was known as the Women's Torah Project.

From October 2010 until spring 2011, Julie Seltzer, one of the female sofers from the Women's Torah Project, scribed a Sefer Torah as part of an exhibition at the Contemporary Jewish Museum in San Francisco. This makes her the first American female sofer to scribe a Sefer Torah. Seltzer is non-denominationally Jewish. From spring 2011 until August 2012 she scribed another Sefer Torah, this time for the Reform congregation Beth Israel in San Diego. On September 22, 2013, Congregation Beth Elohim of New York dedicated a new Torah, which members of Beth Elohim said was the first Torah in New York City to be completed by a woman. The Torah was scribed by Linda Coppleson. As of 2014, there were an estimated 50 female sofers.

== See also ==
- Bat-Kohen (daughter of a priest)
- Bat Levi (daughter of a Levite)
- First World Congress of Jewish Women, 1923
- Jewish feminism
  - List of Jewish feminists
- Women as theological figures
  - Women rabbis and Torah scholars
  - Rebbetzin (Yiddish) or Rabbanit (Hebrew) (Orthodox rabbi's wife)
  - List of women in the Bible
- Bais Yaakov (schools for Haredi girls)
- Niddah (menstruation laws)
- Soferet (female Jewish scribe who can transcribe religious documents)
- Gender and Jewish Studies
- Gender separation in Judaism
  - Ezrat Nashim
  - Tzniut (modest behavior)
  - Negiah (guidelines for physical contact)
  - Yichud (prohibitions of secluding oneself with a stranger)
- Jewish views on marriage
  - Shidduch (finding a marriage partner)
  - Shalom bayit (peace and harmony in the relationship between husband and wife)
  - Zeved habat or Simchat Bat (Jewish baby naming ceremony for girls)
- Minyan (quorum of at least ten Jews acceptable for the recitation of certain prayers)
  - Partnership minyan (a movement to give women more roles in prayer services)
- Agunah (a woman who wishes to divorce her husband, but her husband refused to provide her with a Jewish divorce contract)
- Women in Israel
- Women's Torah Project
  - Women of the Wall
- Jewish religious clothing
