= Lila Kagedan =

Female Orthodox Jewish rabbi

Rabbi Lila Kagedan

Religious life
- Religion: Judaism
- Denomination: Open Orthodox

Jewish leader
- Yeshiva: Yeshivat Maharat
- Semikhah: Rabbi Avi Weiss

Lila Kagedan (45–46 years old) is a Canadian-born Jewish rabbi who in 2016 became the first woman with the title rabbi to be hired by an American Open Orthodox synagogue. This occurred when Mount Freedom Jewish Center in New Jersey hired Kagedan to join their "spiritual leadership team." She is currently the rabbi at Walnut Street Synagogue, an Open Orthodox synagogue in Massachusetts.

== Background ==
Lila Kagedan is the first woman with the title rabbi to be hired by an American Open Orthodox Jewish congregation.

=== Ordination ===
Prior to her ordination as rabbi, Kagedan studied at Midreshet Lindenbaum, an Israeli institution of higher learning for Orthodox women.

Kagedan trained and received ordination in the summer of 2015 from Yeshivat Maharat, the Open Orthodox women's religious training program founded by Rabbi Avi Weiss in the Bronx, New York. Unlike other Maharat graduates, who assumed titles such as rabba (feminine version of "rabbi") or maharat (manhiga hilchatit ruchanit toranit, or "female leader of Jewish law, spirit and Torah"), Kagedan was the first to take the title "rabbi", because she said she felt that it was the most natural following her ordination.

=== Career ===
Kagedan is a medical ethicist and serves as an instructor of bioethics at Touro College. She is also a Hadassah Brandeis Institute - Gender, Culture, Religion and Law research associate, and either serves or has served as a chaplain in various hospitals in the Boston and New York City areas.

In 2011, Kagedan founded the Sulam School in Brookline, Massachusetts, a K-5 program that offers immersive Judaic studies in a pluralistic environment.

In 2016 Mount Freedom Jewish Center in New Jersey, which is Open Orthodox, stated that they had hired Kagedan to join their "spiritual leadership team." After she began that job, it was announced that she had been appointed at the Modern Orthodox Shira Hadasha synagogue in Melbourne, Australia as a Rabbi in Residence; this made her its first female rabbi. She was to serve for five weeks beginning in May 2016.

As of 2017, she is serving, under the title senior Rabbi, at the Walnut Street Synagogue in Massachusetts, having been hired by the synagogue in 2016.

=== Reception in Orthodox community ===
Following Kagedan's hiring as a synagogue rabbi, some Orthodox news outlets reported Kagedan's hiring by an Open Orthodox synagogue with derision, putting terms like "clergy" and "ordination" in quotes.

In 2015, the Rabbinical Council of America, the main Orthodox rabbinical group in the US, formally adopted a policy prohibiting the ordination or hiring of women rabbis by synagogues that operate within the boundaries of their figurative jurisdiction, regardless of title. Also in 2015, Agudath Israel of America denounced any ordaination of women, declaring the ordaining institutions to have rejected the tenets of Orthodoxy.

The Jewish Orthodox Feminist Alliance released a statement supporting women attaining the title of Rabbi and invited Rabbi Kagedan to speak at the 2017 JOFA international conference.

Asked why she chooses to identify with Orthodoxy when a number of other Jewish denominations readily accept female clergy, Kagedan responded that she was raised in Orthodoxy and remains committed to its tenets.

== Personal life ==
Kagedan moved with her family to Ottawa, Ontario, Canada when she was about 8 years old, and she entered the 4th grade at the local Hillel Academy (now the Ottawa Jewish Community School). She then began high school at Machon Sarah High School for Girls, but switched to join the Yitzchak Rabin High School founded by her parents, Ian and Shoshana Kagedan, for its first graduating class.

Kagedan's father died in 2014 from complications due to amyotrophic lateral sclerosis.

== See also ==
- Sara Hurwitz
- Dina Brawer
- Shira Marili Mirvis
- Timeline of women rabbis
