= Congregation Agudath Shalom =

Open Orthodox synagogue in Massachusetts

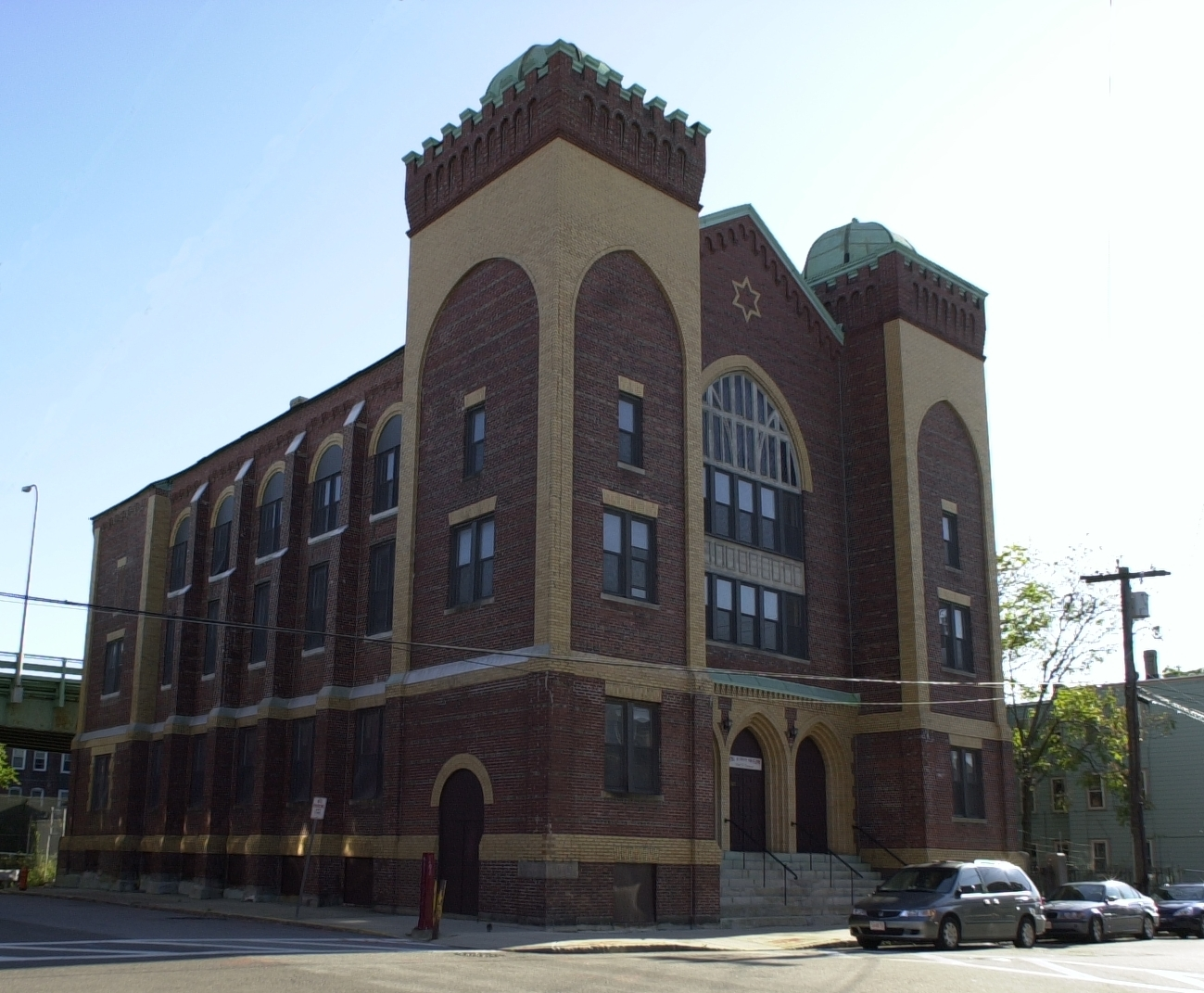
- Congregation Agudath Shalom synagogue

- Location in Massachusetts

Religion
- Affiliation: Orthodox Judaism
- Rite: Open Orthodoxy

Location
- Location: 145 Walnut Street, Chelsea, Massachusetts
- Coordinates: 42°23′34″N 71°2′15″W

Architecture
- Architect: Harry Dustin Joll
- Style: Romanesque Revival
- Established: 1887 (as a congregation)
- Completed: 1909

Website
- walnutstreetsynagogue.com
- Congregation Agudath Shalom
- U.S. National Register of Historic Places
- Area: 0.2 acres (0.081 ha)
- NRHP reference No.: 93000283
- Added to NRHP: April 16, 1993

Congregation Agudath Shalom, also known as Agudas Sholom the Walnut Street Synagogue or the Walnut Street Shul, is a historic Open Orthodox Jewish synagogue at 145 Walnut Street in Chelsea, Massachusetts, United States.

== History ==
The congregation was founded in 1887. The present building was erected in 1909, one year after the great fire that destroyed a third of the buildings in the city. The architect was Harry Dustin Joll. The congregation's previous building was destroyed in the great fire.

It is the oldest surviving synagogue in Chelsea, a city that was one-third Jewish at the time the synagogue was built.

The synagogue possesses a "remarkable" series of wall and ceiling frescoes painted by Jewish immigrant artists. The "magnificent" carved Torah Ark was created by a noted Boston-area cabinetmaker who specialized in synagogue furniture, San Katz, in the 1920s. The synagogue was added to the National Register of Historic Places in 1993.

In 2016, Congregation Agudath Shalom hired Rabbi Lila Kagedan as its full-time spiritual leader. Kagedan is the first graduate of Yeshivat Maharat to take the title of Rabbi for her work as a female Orthodox leader. Kagedan is the first female rabbi of a U.S. Orthodox Jewish synagogue.

== Gallery ==
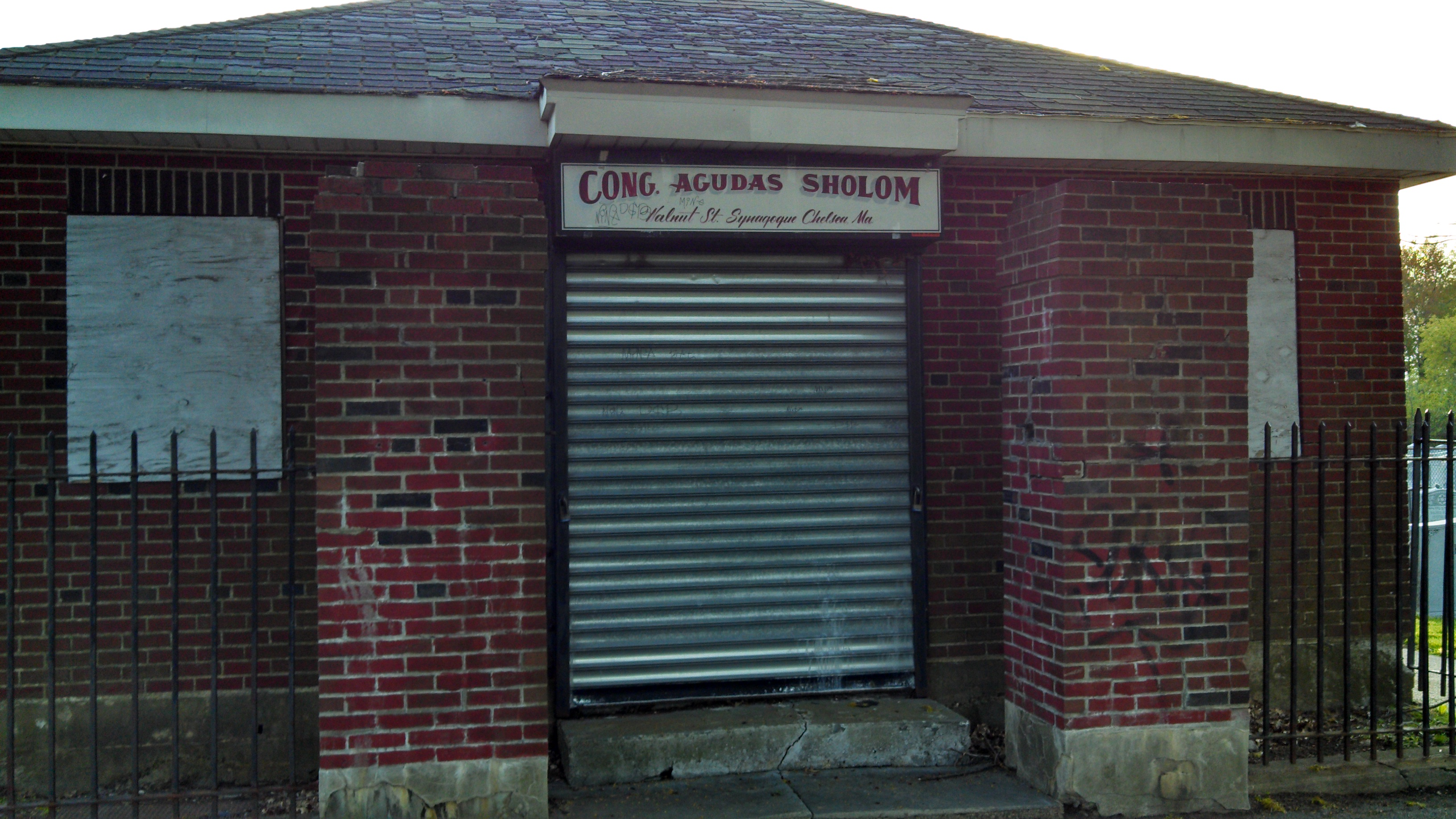
Agudas Sholom chapel at Everett Jewish Cemetery

== See also ==
- National Register of Historic Places listings in Suffolk County, Massachusetts
