= Jewish Orthodox Feminist Alliance =

Open Orthodox Jewish organization

- Abbreviation: JOFA
- Founded: 1997; 29 years ago
- Tax ID no.: 52-2106560
- Legal status: 501(c)(3)
- Purpose: To provide education services to the Orthodox community on women's issues.
- Executive Director: Mindy Feldman Hecht
- Co-Presidents: Rabba Dr. Carmella Abraham, Rabbi Marianne Novak
- Employees: 3 (2026)
- Volunteers: 50 (2018)
- Website: www.jofa.org

The Jewish Orthodox Feminist Alliance (JOFA) is an Orthodox Jewish organization providing educational services on women's issues, with the aim of expanding "the spiritual, ritual, intellectual, and political opportunities for women within the framework of Halakha." It was incorporated on April 14, 1998, with Jewish-American writer Blu Greenberg as its first president. It is active in North America, the United Kingdom, and Australia.

== Activities and positions ==
JOFA has published a number of Halakhic guides on topics related to women's involvement in Orthodox Jewish ritual, released an interactive app for learning the cantillations for reading Megillat Esther, Megillat Ruth, Torah Reads for Simchat Torah, and publishes the biannual JOFA Journal. In November 2019, the organization announced an initiative to pay American Orthodox Jewish synagogues an annual grant of up to $10,000 to hire women as spiritual leaders. Since 1997, JOFA has held international conferences to explore Halakhic and social issues.

JOFA advocates for increased opportunities for women as religious, spiritual and halakhic leaders, as professional and lay leaders, and as teachers of Talmud and Halakha. JOFA supports Orthodox female clergy having the official title Rabbi. JOFA supports women's reproductive rights, including abortion in consultation with their physicians and personal Halakhic advisers. In 2019 JOFA released a statement calling for a solution to the Agunah issue in Israel. The Australian branch of JOFA supports the training of Jewish women as experts in the ritual laws of Niddah through a scholarship program.

== Branches ==
=== United States ===
JOFA was originally founded in the late 1990s as the first Orthodox feminist organization in the United States. The writer Blu Greenberg served as the organization's founding President. Greenberg was followed by Carol Kaufman Newman, Judy Heicklen, Bat Sheva Marcus, and Pam Scheininger. JOFA's stated mission was to strive to expand the religious and spiritual roles Jewish women within the parameters of Jewish ritual law. JOFA also sought to address specific issues related to Orthodox Jewish women in marriage and divorce proceedings.

The founding event for the organization was the International Conference on Feminism and Orthodoxy, held in 1997 in New York City. The organizers of the event were four Orthodox Jewish women from New York: Esther Farber (1935-2003), Bat Sheva Marcus, Ronnie Becher, and Blu Greenberg. Each of the organizers had personally engaged with matters arising from a growing tension between religious life and the feminist values of modern life. JOFA eventually absorbed many members of the Women's Tefillah Network (WTN), a loose Orthodox association of prayer groups founded in the 1980s with the support of some modern Orthodox rabbis. At the time of JOFA's founding, Women's Tefillah Network had more than 40 such member groups in North America, Israel, England, and Australia. Since the establishment of JOFA, however, WTN membership decreased as JOFA began fulfilling many of the network's roles.

=== United Kingdom ===
The UK branch of JOFA was founded by Rabba Dina Brawer, who first encountered JOFA activities in Israel, and later received her rabbinic ordination in 2018 from Maharat. The inaugural conference for JOFA UK took place in 2013. The group's early efforts involved campaigning against domestic violence. The group's other activities include promoting prayer services led by women, as well as supporting the role of Orthodox women rabbis.

=== Australia ===
The Australian branch of JOFA was formally registered in 2020, and launched in 2021. The inaugural president of the JOFA Australia is Nomi Kaltmann. The reception in Australia to the presence of JOFA has been very warm, with many international female orthodox guests given a platform to speak to an Australian audience for the first time, including Rabbanit Devorah Evron, Rabbanit Shira Marili Mirvis and Yoetzet Halacha Michal Roness. In addition, JOFA Australia created the first ever scholarship fund for orthodox Australian women. Its inaugural funding has been used to train 20 Australian women who are training to become qualified Kallah teachers via the Eden Center in Jerusalem with the programs offered through a virtual learning model. In 2021, JOFA Australia announced the formation of the first women's speaker's bureau for Orthodox Jewish women in Australia. The speakers bureau was launched in early 2022.

== Controversy ==
In the fall of 2015, the Agudath Israel of America widely denounced moves to ordain women and declared entities affiliated with Open Orthodoxy, such as JOFA, Yeshivat Chovevei Torah, and Yeshivat Maharat, as not a form of Torah Judaism, similar to other dissident movements throughout Jewish history in having rejected basic tenets of Judaism.

In the past, they have supported the activism by Adina Sash (also known by her alias "FlatbushGirl") but have since retracted their support after her recent controversial campaigns.

== See also ==
- Orthodox Jewish feminism
- Kolech
- Partnership minyan
- Shira Hadasha
- Women in Judaism
- Chochmat Nashim
