= Dina Brawer =

Orthodox rabbi in the UK

Dina Brawer (born Dina Elmaleh) is an Open Orthodox woman rabbi and the founder of the Jewish Orthodox Feminist Alliance division in the United Kingdom (JOFA UK). Brawer received her rabbinical ordination at Yeshivat Maharat in the United States and is the first Orthodox woman rabbi to serve in the UK. Brawer's work at JOFA UK focuses on women's rights in Orthodox Judaism and the religious education of adult women in Orthodox communities in the UK.

== Background ==
Brawer was born and raised in Milan, Italy to a Chabad Hasidic family. After migrating to the United Kingdom, Brawer's education included a B.A. in Hebrew and Jewish Studies from the University of London, an M.A. in Education and Psychology from the Institute of Education, London. In 2013, Brawer established and led JOFA UK to advocate for expanding the religious roles of women in Britain's Orthodox communities. Subsequently, Brawer joined Yeshivat Maharat and received her ordination in 2018. Brawer is not formally affiliated with the Chabad Hasidic community but has described her education and training in Chabad as fundamental to her approach to Judaism. Brawer is married to Rabbi Dr. Naftali Brawer who was born in Boston but raised in Canada. Brawer and her husband co-founded of the Mishkan community in London which is described as a "transdenominational, pop-up Jewish community". After years of service in Britain's Jewish community, the Brawers relocated to the United States.

=== Women's Torah study ===
While living in the UK, Brawer produced the #YourTorah podcast, which is described as a journey through the 63 tractates of the Mishnah, taught entirely by women. The run time for each episode is 18 minutes.

=== Recognition ===
Dina Brawer was listed among Britain's 100 most influential Jewish community activists in 2016.

== See also ==
- Sara Hurwitz
- Shira Marili Mirvis
- Miriam Anzovin
- Timeline of women rabbis
