= Miriam Gonczarska =

Polish Jewish spiritual leader (1972–2026)

Maharat Miriam Gonczarska
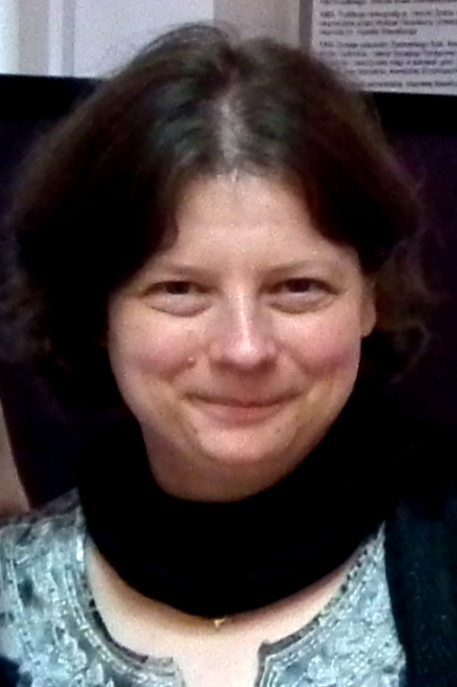

Personal life
- Born: 24 November 1972 Warsaw, Poland
- Died: May 2026 (aged 53)
- Education: University of Warsaw, Yeshivat Maharat

Religious life
- Religion: Judaism
- Denomination: Progressive Judaism
- Profession: Maharat, journalist

Jewish leader
- Position: graduate (2015)
- Yeshiva: Yeshivat Maharat
- Organisation: Jewish Community of Warsaw

Miriam Gonczarska-Shapiro (24 November 1972 – May 2026) was a Polish Jewish spiritual leader who in 2015 received her Semikhah as the first European, and in the same time the first Polish maharat.

== Early life and education ==
Gonczarska was born in Warsaw, Poland on 24 November 1972, to the Polish-Jewish family. She was a daughter of Edmund Gonczarski (Mendel Garncarski; 1922–1979), poet and journalist and a Polish mother.

In 1994 she graduated from LXI Secondary School in Warsaw and soon after she converted to Judaism. From the beginning of 1990s she was involved in revival of the Jewish community in Poland: she co-created "Jidele" (magazine for Jewish children), cooperated with "Midrasz" (Jewish cultural monthly magazine), and served as coordinator of educational programs at the Union of Jewish Religious Communities. She also worked as editor of "Kol Polin" – Hebrew language section of Radio Poland ( Polish Radio section for abroad). Her texts have been published also in press like "Więź" (Catholic monthly), "Gazeta Wyborcza", and "Przegląd Powszechny". She has also served as Jewish law and religion expert for the Polish television ("Babilon" program for TVN24, "Piąta strona nieba" in Religia.tv, and press ("Wprost" weekly). She also worked with Jewish cultural and religious portal Jewish.org.pl.

She was a member, and also served as Secretary, of the Religious Council of the Union of Jewish Religious Communities in Poland, member of the board of the Polish Association of Jewish Women. She also was a member of B'nai B'rith Polska and Jewish Historical Institute Association. Until 2014 she has also served as member of the Revision Board of the Jewish Religious Community of Warsaw. She has also helped creating "Ec Chaim" – reform community by the Religious Jewish Community.

Gonczarska studied religious thought, and law and Torah in Israel (Nishmat, MaTan, and Pardes Institute of Jewish Studies) and in United States (Yeshivat Maharat). Gonczarska had a maharat (woman spiritual leader) degree received after graduation from 5-year study program of Yeshivat Maharat. She is the first European and Polish Jewish woman to gain such degree and maharat title.

== Inter-religious dialogue ==
Already as a student-member of PUSZ (Polish Union of Jewish Students), Gonczarska often participated in Christian-Jewish events like seminars or study tours organized by PUSZ together with KIK (Club of Catholic Intelligentsia). Her further involvement in Jewish community and studies of Jewish thought, went along with her continuous commitment to dialogue between religions, especially with Christianity. She served as member of the board of the Polish Council of Christians and Jews.

== Death ==
Gonczarska died in May 2026, at the age of 53.
