= International Rabbinic Fellowship =

Orthodox Jewish Rabbinical Association

The International Rabbinic Fellowship (IRF) is a Modern Orthodox rabbinical organization founded by Rabbis Avi Weiss and Marc D. Angel in 2007. The group is open to Orthodox rabbis, including graduates of Yeshivat Chovevei Torah and Yeshivat Maharat, and is the only Orthodox rabbinical association to admit women rabbis as members. The group's current president is Rabbi Yonah Berman and its Executive Director is Rabbi Jason Herman.

== Overview ==
IRF began as a fellowship of Orthodox rabbis and spiritual leaders with a more open and accessible view of Orthodox Judaism. The IRF views itself as a counterpart to the Rabbinical Council of America and is one of the main association of Modern Orthodox rabbis. In 2018, the association reportedly consisted of approximately 250 members. The differentiation of the positions held by the IRF from those held by other Orthodox associations have led some to point to the irrelevance of denominational labels in contemporary Judaism. Alternatively, the IRF is evidence of a shifting trend, within modern Orthodoxy, away from fundamentalism.

The IRF supports the ordination of women and their role in the clergy and since 2012 has admitted female members. Prior to this decision, in December 2010, the group had voted against such a proposal. The IRF supports the use of a halachic prenuptial agreement, and in 2012 the group passed a resolution stating that member rabbis may only officiate a wedding if the couple has signed such an agreement.

== Publications ==
- "Halakhic Realities: Collected Essays on Organ Donation" (ed. Zev Farber). Maggid Books, 2017. ISBN 9781592644070
- "Halakhic Realities: Collected Essays on Brain Death" (ed. Zev Farber). Maggid Books, 2016. ISBN 9781592644063
