= Meesh Hammer-Kossoy =

Jewish religious figure

- Other name: Michelle Hammer-Kossoy

Academic background
- Education: New York University
- Thesis: Divine justice in rabbinic hands: Talmudic reconstitution of the penal system (2005)

Meesh Hammer-Kossoy (October 1969 – present), also known as Rabbi Meesh Hammer-Kossoy, is an American-Israeli who became one of Israel’s first female Orthodox Rabbis in 2015.

== Education and career ==
Hammer-Kossoy obtained a B.A. in Near Eastern and Judaic Studies from Brandeis University, and an M.A. and Ph.D. in Talmud from New York University. She completed her dissertation in 2005 which explored the criminal punishment system in the Talmudic period. After completing her studies at Beit Midrash Har’el, in 2015 she received Orthodox ordination from Rabbi Herzl Hefter and Rabbi Daniel Sperber, thereby becoming one of Israel’s first female Orthodox Rabbis.

As of 2024 Hammer-Kossoy works at the non-denominational Pardes Institute of Jewish Studies in Jerusalem. In 2024 she spoke about how people contact her because they want to interact with a female rabbi. She also works with groups and clergy members to ask families to ‘adopt’ asylum seekers who came to Israel alone as minors.

== Personal life ==
Hammer-Kossoy lives in Jerusalem with her husband and their three children.

== Selected publications ==
- Hammer-Kossoy, Meesh (2015-01-01). "Daring Decrees and Radical Responsibility: Why Rabbinic Tikkun Olam Is Not What You Think". Tikkun Olam: Judaism, Humanism, and Transcendence.
- Hammer-Kossoy, Meesh (2015-11-08). "Pardes 360: Why Orthodox Judaism Needs Women Rabbis". Elmad.
- Hammer-Kossoy, Meesh (2020-06-15). "Why is it so easy to fear those different from ourselves?". The Forward.
- Hammer-Kossoy, Rabbi Meesh (2020-05-05). "#MeToo and Sexual Harassment: A Familiar Mishnah through a New Lens". Jewish Telegraphic Agency.
- Hammer-Kossoy, Meesh (Spring–Summer 2025). "Uncovered: Women's Roles, Mitzvot and Sexuality in Jewish Law". Nashim: A Journal of Jewish Women's Studies & Gender Issues (45): 278–283. ProQuest 3240512915.
