= Sara Hurwitz =

South African-born American rabbi (born 1977)

Rabba Sara Hurwitz

Personal life
- Born: March 15, 1977 (age 49) Johannesburg, South Africa
- Spouse: Josh Abraham
- Children: 4
- Education: Barnard College; Midreshet Lindenbaum

Religious life
- Religion: Judaism
- Denomination: Orthodox Judaism

Jewish leader
- Synagogue: Hebrew Institute of Riverdale
- Yeshiva: Yeshivat Maharat

Sara Hurwitz is a South African-American Orthodox Jewish spiritual leader aligned with the "Open Orthodox" faction of Modern Orthodox Judaism in the United States. She is considered by some to be the first female Orthodox rabbi. She serves at the Hebrew Institute of Riverdale as rabba, and she is the president and co-founder of Yeshivat Maharat, both in Riverdale, New York.

== Early career ==
Hurwitz was born in Johannesburg, South Africa, on March 15, 1977, to relatively secular parents Melanie and Mervyn Hurwitz. Seeing the violence in apartheid South African and not wanting to raise a family there, the Hurwitz family moved to Boca Raton, Florida in 1989. Due to the lack of Jewish day schools in Boca Raton at the time, Hurwitz chose to attend the local public school. Her Jewish education came from her synagogue life, youth groups, and her aunt, who introduced her to Orthodox Judaism. As a teenager, she was interested in teaching Torah and Jewish text to adults.

Hurwitz graduated from high school in 1994 and then studied for a year at Midreshet Lindenbaum. She attended Barnard College, where she majored in psychology, graduating in 1999. While at Barnard, she joined a group of women who created Lights in Action, a student-run organization that connected Jewish students to Judaism by organizing conferences and producing teaching materials. Hurwitz continued as the director of Lights in Action after graduating, serving for a total of six years.

In 2000, Hurwitz entered the Drisha Institute for Women in the Drisha Scholars Circle Program. During her time at Drisha, Hurwitz began teaching and lecturing around the country with programs such as the Jewish Orthodox Feminist Alliance, CLAL, and Jewish Community Centers. After graduating in 2003, she worked for JOFA's Gender and Orthodoxy project for three years and developed a gender-sensitive biblical curriculum for Orthodox day schools.

== Rabbinic career ==
=== Ordination ===
In 2003, Hurwitz began working with Rabbi Avi Weiss of the Hebrew Institute of Riverdale. She became the congregational intern for ten years. In this position, she taught, spoke from the pulpit, officiated at life-cycle events, helped lead the women's prayer group, answered halakhic (Jewish legal) questions, and provided counseling. However, although she conducted all of the rabbinical functions except for those in the minyan (as an Orthodox minyan requires ten men), she was not able to be included in the congregation's rabbinic staff due to her gender. While her male counterparts were assistant rabbi and moved on to their own pulpits, she was unable to advance in a similar way.

Hurwitz studied halakha under Weiss for eight years, culminating in her completing her oral and written exams in 2008. Weiss and two colleagues, including Daniel Sperber agreed to ordain her in the near future, and Weiss and Sperber publicly gave her the title "Maharat" in a public ceremony at HIR in March 2009 (the third colleague withdrew due to public criticism). Although groups hosted by Blu Greenberg had determined that she should take the title "rabbi" or "rabba," Weiss decided to use the title "MaHaRaT", an acronym for Manhiga Hilchatit Ruchanit Toranit (Hebrew: מנהיגה הלכתית רוחנית תורנית), denoting a female "leader of Jewish law spirituality and Torah".

In February 2010, Weiss announced that he was changing the title to "rabba", a move criticised by both Agudath Yisrael and the Rabbinical Council of America. While this change has remained controversial, other women have taken the title following Rabba Hurwitz.

=== Creating Maharat ===
In conversations with other women surrounding and at her ordination, Hurwitz and Weiss realized the need for an institution to support the Orthodox ordination of women. They announced the creation of such an institution, and in September 2009 opened Maharat. Within several years of Hurwitz's ordination, subsequent Orthodox women also received ordination as well as positions within Orthodox synagogues. This development indicated that Hurwitz was no longer an exception within Orthodox Judaism.

=== Connecting with other female rabbis ===
On Dec. 6th, 2010, at Conservative Temple Reyim in Newton, MA, Sara Hurwitz met with Amy Eilberg, the first female Conservative rabbi, Sally Priesand, the first American Reform female rabbi (second in the world after Regina Jonas), and Sandy Eisenberg Sasso, the first Reconstructionist female rabbi. They and approximately 30 other women rabbis lit Chanukah candles and spoke about their experiences in an open forum.

On June 3, 2012, Priesand, Sasso, Eilberg, and Hurwitz met again, this time at Monmouth Reform Temple at a celebration honoring the four first women rabbis to be ordained in their respective denominations, and the 40th anniversary of Priesand's ordination.

== Personal life ==
In 2001, Hurwitz married lawyer Joshua Abraham, with whom she has four sons.

== Recognition ==
- 2010: Listed in Newsweek's 50 most influential rabbis
- 2013: Bernice S. Tannenbaum prize, the Hadassah Foundation
- 2014: Myrtle Wreath Award, the Southern New Jersey Region of Hadassah
- 2016: Trailblazer Award, UJA Federation of New York
- 2016: The Jewish Week's 36 Under 36
- 2016: Forward's 50 most influential Jewish leaders
- 2016: Newsweek's 50 most influential rabbis
- 2017: Wexner Foundation Field Fellows, inaugural class
- 2020: Auburn Seminary Lives of Commitment honoree
- 2023: Rabbi Israel & Libby Mowshowitz Award, New York Board of Rabbis

The 2022 art exhibit “Holy Sparks”, shown among other places at the Dr. Bernard Heller Museum, featured art about twenty-four female rabbis who were firsts in some way; Kathryn Jacobi created the artwork about Hurwitz that was in that exhibit.

== See also ==
- Regina Jonas
- Dina Najman
- Dina Brawer
- Shira Marili Mirvis
- Timeline of women rabbis
