= Open Orthodoxy =

Jewish religious movement

Open Orthodox Judaism is a Jewish religious movement committed to following halakha (Jewish law), emphasizing intellectual openness in Jewish scholarship and practice, and expanding the role of women in Jewish life. The term was coined in 1997 by Rabbi Avi Weiss, who views halakha as permitting more flexibility than normative Orthodox Judaism had traditionally allowed for.

Weiss opened Yeshivat Chovevei Torah (YCT), a men’s rabbinical school, in 1999 and later founded Maharat for training women clergy. In 2007, Weiss co-founded the International Rabbinic Fellowship for Open Orthodox rabbis, and, in 2015, he and Rabbi Asher Lopatin, YCT's president, resigned from the Rabbinical Council of America (RCA). The movement's ordination of women is a source of friction within Orthodox Judaism.

== Overview ==
Weiss sought to establish an approach to Orthodox Judaism that emphasizes inclusivity and open-mindedness compared to traditional norms. As a result, he founded new educational institutions aimed at training clergy who could implement this vision: YCT's rabbinical school to train rabbis who would be "open, non-judgmental, knowledgeable, empathetic, and eager to transform Orthodoxy into a movement that meaningfully and respectfully interacts with all Jews, regardless of affiliation, commitment, or background" and, later, Maharat to train equivalent women Jewish clergy and scholars.

In striving for a more "liberal" Orthodox Judaism, Weiss was required to clarify the differences between the Orthodox and non-Orthodox movements within Judaism. He states that all Orthodox Judaism, including Open Orthodoxy, fundamentally differs from Conservative Judaism in three areas:

1. Orthodox Jews believe that the Torah was given by God at Mount Sinai in its current form.
2. Orthodoxy believes that "legal authority is cumulative, and that a contemporary posek [decider] can only issue judgments based on a full history of Jewish legal precedent". In contrast, Conservative Jews believe "precedent provides illustrations of possible positions rather than binding law. Conservatism, therefore, remains free to select whichever position within the prior history appeals to it".
3. Orthodoxy is characterized by ritually observant members who "meticulously keep Shabbat (the Sabbath), Kashrut (the Dietary Laws), Taharat ha-Mishpaḥa (the Laws of Family Purity), and pray three times a day". In contrast, Conservative Judaism "is generally not composed of ritually observant Jews. Thus, only in our community if a 'permissive custom' is accepted, can it be meaningful."

In the matter of conversion to Judaism, Weiss encountered difficulties with being accepted by the Israeli Rabbinate.

=== Terminology ===
Although "Open Orthodox" was widely used in various portions of the movement, that ended in 2017. YCT wrote "'Open Orthodox' is not a term that we use to describe ourselves, nor is it part of any language on our site, mission, marketing materials, etc." The affiliated women's rabbinical seminary, Maharat, also no longer does.

Sylvia Barack Fishman, a professor of Judaic studies at Brandeis University, stated that some critics use the term "Open Orthodox" derogatorily rather than descriptively to delegitimize Modern Orthodox Jewish leaders, institutions, and laypersons who support women’s leadership in Judaism.

== Institutions ==
=== Yeshivat Chovevei Torah ===
In 1999 Weiss founded Yeshivat Chovevei Torah Rabbinical School (YCT), which is currently located in the Riverdale section of the Bronx, New York. Following its opening as a yeshiva, a rabbinical school was opened in September 2000 with its first class of seven students. While the institution today described itself as Modern Orthodox, YCT, until 2017, described itself as an "Open Orthodox," and its mission statement made heavy use of the term its founder Weiss had coined.

Controversies over YCT came to a head when in 2006 YCT applied for membership in the Rabbinical Council of America, the rabbinical body affiliated with the Orthodox Union, the largest North American Modern and Centrist Orthodox body. YCT subsequently withdrew their application when it became apparent that the application would be denied.

The Yeshivat Chovevei Torah Rabbinical School (YCT) states on its website that it is Modern Orthodox rabbinical school.

=== International Rabbinic Fellowship ===
The International Rabbinic Fellowship (IRF) is a Modern Orthodox rabbinical organization founded by Rabbis Avi Weiss and Marc D. Angel in 2007. The group is open to graduates of Yeshivat Chovevei Torah. The group's current president is Rabbi Yonah Berman. The group is noted for being the only Orthodox rabbinical association to admit women rabbis as members.

== Religious positions ==
=== Ordination of women ===
In May 2009, Weiss announced the opening of Yeshivat Maharat, a new school to train women as Maharat, an acronym for the Hebrew מנהיגה הלכתית רוחנית תורנית (halakhic, spiritual, and Torah leader), a title he created for a female version of a rabbi. The school's mission, according to its website, is "to train Orthodox women as spiritual leaders and halakhic authorities" in a four-year full-time course. Sara Hurwitz was appointed dean of Yeshivat Maharat. On June 16, 2013 the first class of female maharats graduated from Yeshivat Maharat.

==== Sara Hurwitz ====
In June 2009 Weiss ordained Sara Hurwitz as rabbi, giving her the title of Maharat. She was the first formally ordained Open Orthodox woman.

In February 2010 Weiss announced that Hurwitz would henceforth be known by the title of Rabba. The move sparked widespread criticism in the Orthodox world. The Agudath Israel Council of Torah Sages issued a public statement suggesting that Weiss should no longer be considered Orthodox, declaring that "these developments represent a radical and dangerous departure from Jewish tradition and the mesoras haTorah, and must be condemned in the strongest terms. Any congregation with a woman in a rabbinical position of any sort cannot be considered Orthodox." Rumors circulated in the Jewish press that RCA considered expelling Weiss. Under pressure from the RCA, Weiss pledged not to ordain anybody else "rabba", although Hurwitz retains the title.

Shortly afterwards, the RCA passed a resolution praising the increased Torah education of women in the Orthodox world encouraging "halachically and communally appropriate professional opportunities" for them, but stating: "We cannot accept either the ordination of women or the recognition of women as members of the Orthodox rabbinate, regardless of title." This was followed by an RCA ruling issued in October 2015 that women may not be ordained, hired as rabbinical clergy, nor titled as such.

==== Subsequent ordinations ====
In 2015 Yaffa Epstein was ordained as "Rabba" by Yeshivat Maharat, which Weiss founded. Also in 2015, Lila Kagedan was ordained as rabbi by that same organization, which made her their first graduate to take the title rabbi. In 2016 Lila Kagedan became the first female clergy member hired by an Open Orthodox synagogue while using the title "rabbi." This occurred when Mount Freedom Jewish Center in New Jersey, which is Open Orthodox, hired Kagedan to join their "spiritual leadership team." In 2018 Dina Brawer, born in Italy but living in Britain, was ordained by Yeshivat Maharat and thus became Britain's first female Open Orthodox rabbi; she chose the title Rabba.

== Reception ==
=== Orthodox criticism ===
The vast majority of rabbis within Orthodox Judaism have opposed Weiss' approach to halacha, with Orthodox opposition to Weiss' views, community and institutions (both YCT and Yeshivat Maharat) growing over time. Open Orthodoxy and its proponents have met with harsh criticism and disapproval from within Orthodoxy. Prominent leaders from both the ultra-Orthodox and central or Modern Orthodox communities have levelled harsh critiques of actions and beliefs of Open Orthodox individuals or institutions, stating that Open Orthodoxy is not Orthodox Judaism, but rather akin to the Reform and Conservative movements.

At the 92nd Agudath Israel of America Gala in 2014, the Novominsker Rebbe, Yaakov Perlow, condemned Open Orthodoxy, describing it as "a new danger... that also seeks to subvert the sacred meaning of Judaism, that is steeped in heresy…"

A year and a half later, in November 2015, Agudath Israel of America denounced moves to ordain women, and went even further, declaring Open Orthodoxy, Yeshivat Maharat, Yeshivat Chovevei Torah, and other affiliated entities to be similar to other dissident movements throughout Jewish history in having rejected basic tenets of Judaism.

The Conference of European Rabbis followed suit that same month, stating, "The Conference views with great pain the deviations from religious foundations emanating from the movement called 'Open Orthodoxy', and warns that those who act in this spirit, alumni of the aforementioned movement... will not be recognized by us as rabbis, with all that entails." Jonathan Guttentag of Manchester, UK, explained that by systematically testing the boundaries of normative Jewish practice, Open Orthodoxy "has pushed the envelope that bit far, and... led to positions which take its proponents outside the Orthodox umbrella."

Similar sentiments were echoed in a press release of a ruling by Igud HaRabbonim on February 22, 2018, likening Open Orthodoxy to Reform and Conservative Judaism, and stating, "The clergy of this movement are espousing philosophies of the generation of the Sin of the Golden Calf."

Prominent Central Orthodoxy leaders have also stated that Open Orthodox practices or beliefs are incongruent with Orthodox Judaism. These include Hershel Schacter, Rosh Yeshiva at Rabbi Isaac Elchanan Theological Seminary (RIETS), Yeshiva University and Avrohom Gordimer, a rabbinic coordinator at OU Kosher among others.

Rabbi Aharon Feldman has been an opponent of Open Orthodoxy. He argues that "The basis of Orthodox Judaism is a belief in the Divine origin of both the Oral and Written Torah. Yeshivat Chovevei Torah’s leaders or their graduates have said clearly or implicitly on many occasions that they do not accept that the Torah was authored by Hashem, that parts of the Torah can be excised, and that the Oral Law was developed by Rabbis to adjust the Written Torah to the realities of the time that they lived in. This basic philosophy is what writes them out of Orthodox Jewry."

=== OU/RCA response ===
In 2012, Steven Pruzansky, rabbi of Congregation Bnai Yeshurun in Teaneck, New Jersey and a trustee of the Rabbinical Council of America (RCA) on the Board of the Beth Din of America, contrasted Weiss' approach with that of early 20th century American Conservative Judaism and has asserted would more aptly be called "Neo-Conservative" rather than "Orthodox" Judaism. Concluding an opinion piece in Matzav.com he elaborated:

clarity and honesty at least demand that we recognize before our eyes the creation of a new movement in Jewish life outside the Orthodox world, one that we have seen before. It can be termed ... Neo-Conservatism. 'Open Orthodoxy' is a deceptive brand name, an advertising slogan, and an attempt to remain tethered to the Torah world to re-shape it from within, but far from the reality. The reality is that we are living through the rise of the Neo-Conservatives.

Moshe Averick, a columnist for the Jewish magazine Algemeiner Journal agrees with Pruzansky that Weiss has created a new Jewish movement in America, comparing him with Isaac Mayer Wise (founder of Reform Judaism in America) and Solomon Schechter (founder of Conservative Judaism in the United States). He compared Weiss's ordination of three women as Maharat on June 16, 2013, with the so-called Trefa Banquet of 1883, which marked the split between Reform and Traditional Judaism in America. Says Averick: "Weiss' movement, a form of Judaism that enthusiastically embraces the ideologies of feminism and liberal-progressive-modernism while coating it with a strong Orthodox flavor, could accurately be labeled as Ortho-Feminist Progressive Judaism," but "the term coined by Rabbi Steven Pruzansky … Neo-Conservative Judaism … has managed to fit neatly into the slot to the left of Orthodox Judaism and to the right of Conservative Judaism." In October 2013, dozens of rabbis who defined themselves as "members in good standing or [who] identify with the Rabbinical Council of America", signed a letter arguing that Open Orthodoxy has "plunged ahead, again and again, across the border that divides Orthodoxy from neo-Conservatism".

The Orthodox Union (OU), Rabbinical Council of America (RCA) and National Council of Young Israel have all in turn responded to Open Orthodoxy by severing their ties with the Open Orthodox institutions. The RCA does not accredit the rabbinic qualifications of Yeshivat Chovevei Torah or Yeshivat Maharat graduates, the OU and Young Israel do not accept females as rabbinic clergy, and Young Israel Synagogues no longer accept candidates with YCT accreditation.

Furthermore, in response to Open Orthodoxy new organizations have arisen within Orthodox Judaism as a result of the desire to actively and emphatically voice opposition or critiques against Open Orthodox positions or actions when the pre-existing Orthodox organizations have been slow to voice decisive opinions. These include the Coalition for Jewish Values (CJV) and Traditional Orthodox Rabbis of America (TORA).

=== Response to Orthodox criticism ===
According to Marc Shapiro, Avrohom Gordimer "has assumed the mantle of defender of the faith" and "sees his goal as exposing the non-Orthodox nature of Open Orthodoxy". Shapiro stated that to "deny them the simple courtesy of mentioning their names … is in my opinion simply disgraceful". Gordimer responded in an article in Cross Currents. Ysoscher Katz, Chair, Department of Talmud, Yeshivat Chovevei Torah Rabbinical School, has also threatened legal action against Cross Currents despite claims on Facebook that he was open to these debates, if they "continue to publish Avrohom Gordimer’s libelous and unfounded accusations against me."

In contrast to the negative stance of the Orthodox rabbinic community, Steven Bayme, National Director of Jewish Communal Affairs at the American Jewish Committee, sees Open Orthodoxy as the most authentic form of Modern Orthodoxy. In reference to the installation of Asher Lopatin as incoming president of Yeshivat Chovevei Torah Rabbinical School, Bayme said: "The event demonstrated the power of an Orthodoxy that is truly modern, in the sense of synthesizing modern scholarship and culture with Judaic tradition and learning, and an 'Open Orthodoxy', open to all Jews and open to hearing other viewpoints."

Two years later Lopatin resigned from the Rabbinical Council of America.

YCT, itself, the brainchild of Weiss, however, ultimately reacted to the severe Orthodox disapproval by attempting, at least in name, to distance itself from the term "Open Orthodoxy". The school has removed all references to Open Orthodoxy on its website, replacing "open" with "modern". In an interview with the Jewish Week in August 2017, Asher Lopatin, the school's president said: “When they say, ‘Open Orthodox,’ I say, ‘We are Modern Orthodox. We are a full part of Modern Orthodoxy.’” Modern and mainstream orthodox leaders dispute that affiliation.

The Hebrew Institute of Riverdale, where Weiss served as rabbi ("Senior Rabbi") until his retirement in 2015, and where he continues as "Rabbi in Residence", continues to define itself as "an open Orthodox synagogue."

=== International Rabbinic Fellowship ===
Together with Marc D. Angel, Weiss established the International Rabbinic Fellowship (IRF), which is open to graduates of Yeshivat Chovevei Torah. Founded in 2007, its current president is Rabbi Yonah Berman.

IRF is a fellowship of Open Orthodox Judaism, rabbis and spiritual leaders. It admits female members, supports the ordination of women and their role in the clergy.
