= Shira Marili Mirvis =

Israeli rabbi (born 1980)

Rabbanit Shira Marili Mirvis שירה מרילי מירוויס
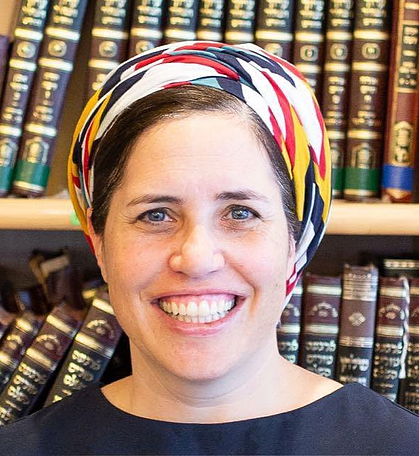

Personal life
- Born: February 3, 1980 (age 46)
- Spouse: Shlomo Mirvis
- Children: 5

Religious life
- Religion: Judaism
- Denomination: Orthodoxy
- Synagogue: Shirat HaTamar
- Position: Spiritual Leader
- Began: 2021
- Semikhah: Women's Institute for Halakhic Leadership at Midreshet Lindenbaum

Shira Marili Mirvis (Hebrew: שירה מרילי מירוויס; born 1980), is an Israeli public figure and teacher. In April, 2021 she was chosen as the spiritual leader of the Shirat HaTamar synagogue in Efrat. She is the first woman to hold the position of sole spiritual leader of an Orthodox community in Israel. Marili Mirvis was officially installed by the Chief Rabbi of Efrat Shlomo Riskin. In February 2022 Globes named her one of the 50 most influential women in Israel and in June of that year it was announced that she would be appointed by Religious Affairs Minister Matan Kahana as the interim chair of the Efrat municipality's religious council. In addition, Marili Mirvis is a fellow of the Honey Foundation for Israel.

Marili Mirvis is a graduate of the Women's Institute for Halakhic Leadership at Midreshet Lindenbaum and likewise holds a BA in Psychology and Information Sciences from Bar-Ilan University. The Shirat HaTamar community which she leads consists of around 45 families from various Jewish ethnic traditions: Ashkenazi Jews as well as Jews of Tunisian, Yemenite, and Moroccan origin. One of its aims is “to include women as much as possible within the guidelines of halacha".

Marili Mirvis is married to Shlomo Mirvis, founder and CEO of the tech startup Intelligo and nephew of Rabbi Sir Ephraim Mirvis, Chief Rabbi of United Kingdom and the Commonwealth. They have five children.

== See also ==
- Dina Brawer
- Lila Kagedan
