= Jennie Rosenfeld =

Jennie Rosenfeld is the first woman to be appointed as the spiritual leader of an Orthodox Jewish community in modern-day Israel. She was appointed by Orthodox Rabbi Shlomo Riskin as the manhiga ruhanit of Efrat in January 2015 to answer residents' questions on halacha, Jewish law. In November 2016, Rosenfeld was appointed administrator of the area's rabbinical court that handles property claims.

Rosenfeld is also the co-author of The Newlywed's Guide to Physical Intimacy, a sexual education book aimed at Orthodox Jews.

== Written works and books ==
Rosenfeld co-authored the book The Newlywed's Guide to Physical Intimacy with David Ribner, an Orthodox therapist.

She wrote her doctoral thesis in 2008, Talmudic re-readings: Toward a Modern Orthodox sexual ethic.
