= Avi Weiss =

American Open Orthodox rabbi

Rabbi Avi Weiss
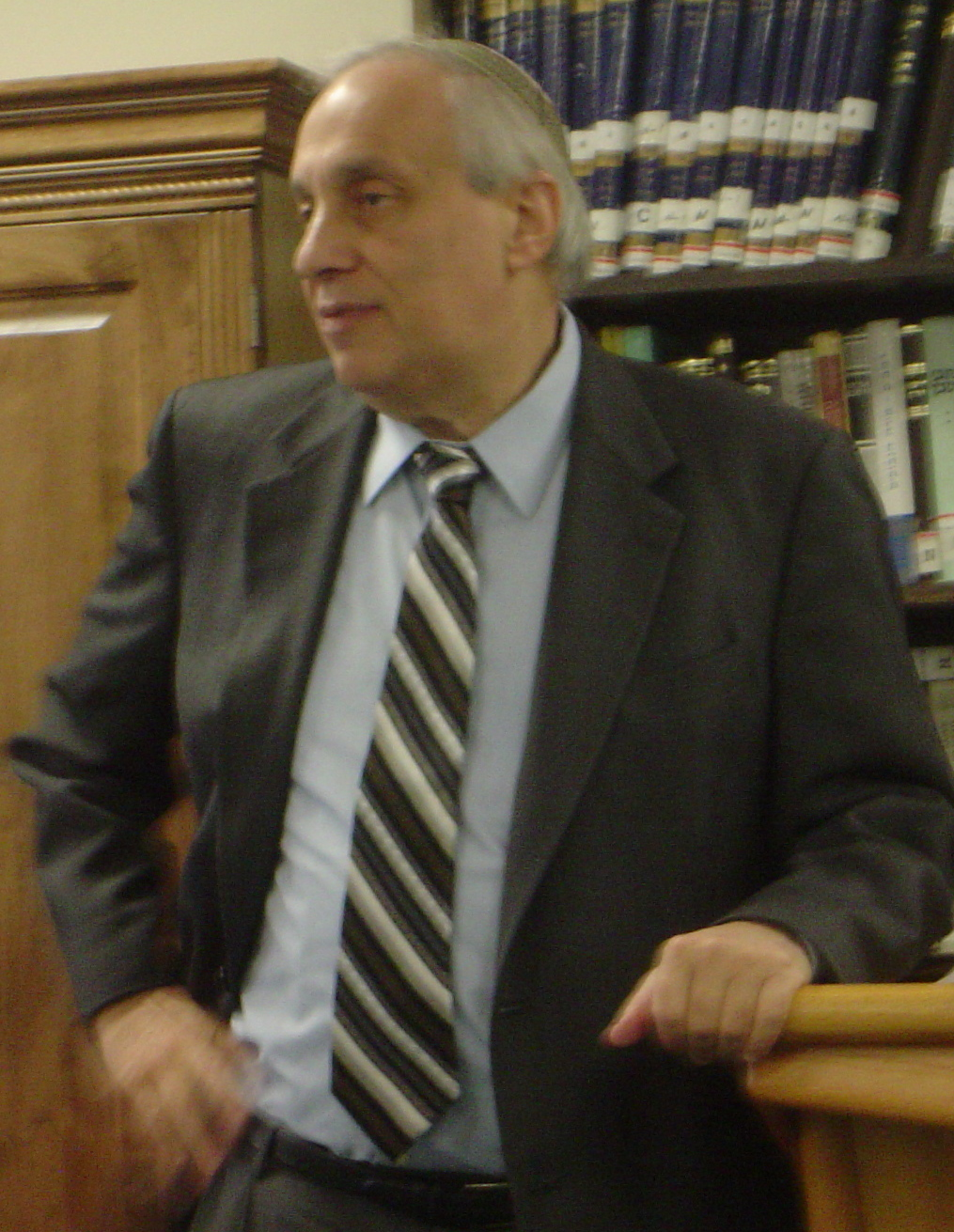
- Weiss in 2007

Personal life
- Born: Avraham Weiss; Hebrew: אברהם חיים יוסף הכהן ווייס; June 24, 1944 (age 82)
- Spouse: Toby Weiss
- Children: 3
- Education: Yeshiva University; Rabbi Isaac Elchanan Theological Seminary (RIETS)
- Occupation: Rabbi, author

Religious life
- Religion: Judaism
- Denomination: Open Orthodox

Jewish leader
- Synagogue: Hebrew Institute of Riverdale
- Yeshiva: Yeshivat Chovevei Torah; Yeshivat Maharat
- Semikhah: RIETS (1968)

Avraham Haim Yosef Weiss (Hebrew: אברהם חיים יוסף הכהן ווייס; born June 24, 1944) is an American Open Orthodox ordained rabbi, author, teacher, lecturer, and activist who led the Hebrew Institute of Riverdale in The Bronx, New York until 2015. He is the founder of Yeshivat Chovevei Torah for men and Yeshivat Maharat for women, rabbinical seminaries that are tied to Open Orthodoxy, a breakaway movement that Weiss originated, which is to the left of Modern Orthodox Judaism and to the right of Conservative Judaism. He is co-founder of the International Rabbinic Fellowship, a rabbinical association that is a liberal alternative to the Orthodox Rabbinical Council of America, and founder of the grassroots organization Coalition for Jewish Concerns – Amcha.

Semikhah (rabbinical ordination) of women by Weiss' movement has been a source of friction within Orthodox Judaism.

== Early life and career ==
Weiss was born to Moshe and Miriam Weiss. His sister is Tova Reich. Weiss received his semikhah (rabbinical ordination) at the Rabbi Isaac Elchanan Theological Seminary of Yeshiva University in 1968.

In 2013, Newsweek ranked Weiss the 10th most prominent rabbi in the United States, climbing from number 11 in 2012 and number 12 in 2011, after being ranked number 18 in 2010.

On June 29, 2015, Weiss resigned from the Rabbinical Council of America (RCA) in protest over their decision to not accept graduates of his rabbinical seminary into the organization.

== Hebrew Institute of Riverdale ==
The Hebrew Institute of Riverdale (HIR) was founded in 1971 in a boiler room of the Whitehall Building off the Henry Hudson Parkway by former members of the Hebrew Institute of University Heights in the Bronx who had moved to Riverdale. Weiss, who had finished his training at Yeshiva University a few years earlier and held pulpits in Creve Coeur, Missouri and Monsey, New York, became the synagogue's rabbi in 1973. The congregation has grown to 850 families, and has served as a platform for Weiss's rabbinical advocacy. Weiss stepped down from the pulpit in July 2015, and Steven Exler became HIR's senior rabbi. Weiss continues to remain on the synagogue's staff.

On one Friday night, the synagogue introduced "the first woman to lead this service in an established Orthodox synagogue in front of a mixed congregation".

== Open Orthodoxy ==
In 1997, Weiss started a new religious movement which he called Open Orthodoxy, which is to the left of Modern Orthodox Judaism and to the right of Conservative Judaism. Weiss noted that the latter "is generally not composed of ritually observant Jews."

=== Yeshivat Chovevei Torah ===
In 1999 Weiss founded Yeshivat Chovevei Torah (YCT), a rabbinic seminary in the Riverdale neighborhood of the Bronx after resigning from Yeshiva University, where he had taught at Stern College for Women for decades. The school's graduates work as rabbis in synagogues, college Hillels and schools, but the RCA does not permit membership to the school's graduates unless they have also been ordained by a traditional Orthodox rabbinical school. In June 2013, Weiss handed over the presidency of YCT to Chicago rabbi Asher Lopatin.

=== Ordination of Women ===
In May 2009, Weiss announced the opening of Yeshivat Maharat, a new school to train women, bestowing upon them the title Maharat, which he himself created. Sara Hurwitz was appointed dean of Yeshivat Maharat.

=== International Rabbinic Fellowship ===
Along with Marc D. Angel, Weiss co-founded the International Rabbinic Fellowship. Founded as an alternative to the Orthodox RCA, the organization was designed to accept YCT graduates.

=== Criticism ===
Rabbis associated with the Orthodox Union, RCA and Modern Orthodox Judaism have opposed Weiss' Open Orthodoxy. Some have criticized his ordination of women rabbis as being incongruous with Orthodox Judaism, the stream of Judaism from which Weiss received his own semikhah. Agudath Israel of America, while denouncing moves to ordain women, went a step further. On November 3, 2015 the Moetzes of Agudath Israel of America declared Open Orthodoxy, YCT, Yeshivat Maharat and other affiliated entities to be similar to other dissident movements throughout Jewish history in having rejected basic tenets of Judaism. Still, Weiss has his defenders.

Weiss has encountered difficulties from the Israeli Rabbinate in regards to the acceptability of his conversions to Judaism.

== Activism ==
Weiss has been vocal on many issues, including emigration and absorption of Soviet Jews, clemency for Jonathan Pollard, supporting Israel, preserving Holocaust memorials, and exposing antisemitism. In 1992 he founded Amcha – the Coalition for Jewish Concerns, a grassroots coalition engaging in pro-Jewish activism. Weiss's lifetime of activism is presented in the documentary Righteous Rebel: Rabbi Avi Weiss.

=== Soviet Jewry ===
Weiss was an early leader of the Student Struggle for Soviet Jewry, founded in 1964. It was one of the first American organizations working to free Russian Jews, who were not allowed to emigrate during the Soviet era. The group used demonstrations, lobbying, and education to pressure the Soviet authorities into allowing Jews to leave the country. During the 1970s and 1980s Weiss was best known for his slogan "1 2 3 4; Open up the Iron Door". In 2015, Weiss published his memoir detailing his efforts to liberate Soviet Jews, Open Up the Iron Door: Memoirs of a Soviet Jewry Activist. The book focuses on how grassroots activism and acts of civil disobedience led to important policy changes for the Soviet Jews.

=== Holocaust remembrance ===
A response to his "Holocaust Symbols or Objects of Worship" article in the March/April 2002 issue of Martyrdom and Resistance was printed in the September/October issue. The 2-section article acknowledged that "the most trustworthy guardian of the memory .. is to be found in Judaism itself, in its liturgy and its religious calendar." The closing challenged Weiss to accept her idea of wearing a "yellow six-sided star ... for a few moments every year."

=== In the United States ===
Weiss was an official emissary of former New York Governor Mario Cuomo and former New York Mayor Rudolph Giuliani.

Weiss has served as personal rabbi to Jonathan Pollard, an American who spied for Israel sentenced to life in prison in 1987. In 1992 Weiss was one of the signers of a full-page ad in The New York Times calling for the release of Pollard. In 1989 Weiss conducted a "freedom Seder" in front of the prison where Pollard was incarcerated.

At a speech at New York City Hall in 2001 Weiss criticized President George W. Bush for not making a clearer distinction between Arab acts of terrorism and Israeli acts of self-defense. "The trap that he's falling into is that he's drawn a moral equivalency between cold-blooded murder and acts of self-defense," Weiss said.

In April 2002 Weiss organized a pro-Israel rally on the National Mall in Washington, D.C., and a boycott of several large newspapers perceived as having an anti-Israeli bias.

In 2006 Weiss organized a protest in front of Syria's UN mission to denounce a Hezbollah offensive in the Middle East.

In September 2011, Weiss was arrested in front of the U.N. building in New York while protesting the Palestinian statehood bid.

In a July 15, 2015, Haaretz opinion piece, Weiss applauded the U.S. Supreme Court decision legalizing same-sex marriage, which he saw as a part of maintaining the separation of church and state and protecting his right to refuse to perform gay weddings. He stated that he would not participate in same-sex weddings, because doing so would run contrary to his religious commitments, but that he had met countless gay individuals and couples, some of whom were members of his synagogue, who lived loving, exemplary lives. "If I welcome with open arms those who do not observe Sabbath, Kashrut or family purity laws, I must welcome, even more so, homosexual Jews, as they are born with their orientation."

=== In Europe ===
Weiss has travelled worldwide as an activist in various causes. In 1989 Weiss and others protested at a Carmelite convent that had been established at Auschwitz. The group – dressed in concentration camp clothing – scaled the walls of the convent, blew a shofar, and screamed anti-Nazi slogans. Workers evicted them from the site. In an August 1989 speech, Cardinal Józef Glemp referenced the incident and ascribed a violent intent to the protesters, saying, "Recently, a squad of seven Jews from New York launched an attack on the convent at Oswiecim [Auschwitz]. They did not kill the nuns or destroy the convent only because they were stopped." In the same speech, Glemp made antisemitic remarks suggesting that Jews control the news media. Alan Dershowitz filed a defamation suit against Glemp, then Archbishop of Warsaw, on behalf of Weiss. In 1993 Pope John Paul II ordered the closure of the convent, which had been located in a converted building that had stored Zyklon B gas used to kill prisoners at the camp during World War II.

He protested President Ronald Reagan's visit to an SS cemetery in 1985. He was arrested in 1990 while protesting Kurt Waldheim's visit to the Salzburg Festival, and again in 1994, when he protested in Oslo, Norway, when PLO chief Yasser Arafat received the Nobel Peace Prize.

Along with Rosa Sacharin of Glasgow, Scotland, Weiss sued the American Jewish Committee in New York state court in 2003 to stop the construction of a path through the Belzec extermination camp in Poland. They were concerned that mass graves at the site would be disturbed by the work.

== Works ==
- Weiss, Avi (2000). Haggadah for the Yom HaShoah Seder. Hackensack, NJ: Jonas Pub. ISBN 0-615-11519-5.
- Weiss, Avi (2001). Principles of Spiritual Activism. Hoboken, NJ: KTAV Publishing House. ISBN 0-88125-737-0.
- Weiss, Avi (2001). Women at Prayer: A Halakhic Analysis of Women's Prayer Groups. Hoboken, NJ: KTAV Publishing House. ISBN 0-88125-719-2.
- Weiss, Avi (2006). "Avigayil: Savior of David". In Helfgot, Nathaniel (ed.). The Yeshivat Chovevei Torah Tanakh Companion to the Book of Samuel. Teaneck, NJ: Ben Yehuda Press. ISBN 0-9769862-4-8.
- Weiss, Avi (2014). Holistic Prayer: A Guide to Jewish Spirituality. Jerusalem: Maggid Books. ISBN 978-1-592-64334-9.
- Weiss, Avi (2015). Open Up the Iron Door: Memoirs of a Soviet Jewry Activist. Jerusalem: The Toby Press. ISBN 978-1-592-64385-1.
- Weiss, Avi (April 1, 2019). Journey to Open Orthodoxy. Jerusalem: Urim Publications. ISBN 978-1602803183.
- Weiss, Avi (August 28, 2023). Torat Ahava - Loving Torah. Jerusalem: Gefen Publishing House. ISBN 978-9657023570.
- Weiss, Avi (February 25, 2025). Haggadah Yehi Ohr. Teaneck, NJ: Ben Yehuda Press. ISBN 978-1963475678.

Articles in Sh'ma: A Journal of Jewish Responsibility

- Creating an Open Orthodox Rabbinate, with Dov Linzer, Vol. 33/no.597-598 2003.
- A Congregation of Holy Souls: Reflections on 9/11 One Year Later Vol.33/no.593 2002.
- NiSh'ma:Apikorus, with Rebecca T. Alpert, Shmuley Boteach, Lisa S. Lehmann Vol.31/no.574 2000.
- Endthoughts: Stolen Money and Stolen Souls, Vol.27/no.535 1997.
- The Insurmountable Divisiveness of Patrilineality, Vol.25/no.469 1994.
- With Jonathan Pollard, Vol.23/no.453 1993.
