= Yeshivat Maharat =

Jewish educational institution in New York

- Established: 2009
- Founders: Rabba Sara Hurwitz and Rabbi Avi Weiss
- Religious affiliation: Jewish
- President: Rabba Sara Hurwitz
- Location: Bronx, New York; 40.888°N 73.910°W
- Language: English, Hebrew
- Website: https://www.yeshivatmaharat.org

Yeshivat Maharat is a Jewish educational institution in The Bronx, New York, which is the first yeshiva in North America to ordain women. The word Maharat (Hebrew: מהר״ת) is a Hebrew acronym for phrase manhiga hilkhatit rukhanit Toranit (Hebrew: מנהיגה הלכתית רוחנית תורנית), denoting a female "leader of Jewish law spirituality and Torah." Semikha is awarded to graduates after a 4-year-long program composed of intensive studies of Jewish law, Talmud, Torah, Jewish thought, leadership training, and pastoral counseling. The ordination functions as a credentialed pathway for women in the Orthodox Jewish community to serve as clergy members.

== History ==
In 2009, Rabbi Avi Weiss and Rabbi Daniel Sperber ordained Rabba Sara Hurwitz. She was the first woman to receive Orthodox-affiliated semikha. That same year, Hurwitz and Weiss founded Yeshivat Maharat with the intent to be an Orthodox rabbinical school for women in New York, with Hurwitz as President. Four years later, the first three graduates received ordination and went on to take leadership positions in Montreal and Washington, D.C. By 2025, 100 women had graduated from Yeshivat Maharat, and gone on to serve in clergy roles in Orthodox synagogues, schools, hospitals, universities, and Jewish communal institutions.

In 2015, Lila Kagedan became the organization's first graduate to adopt the title Rabbi (רבי). Other graduates of Maharat have adopted titles such as Maharat, Rabba (רבה, a neologism), and Rabbanit (רבנית, traditionally denoting a rabbi's wife).

=== Condemnation by the American Orthodox rabbinate ===
The Rabbinical Council of America has condemned Maharat for being outside the bounds of Orthodox Judaism, and in 2015 passed a resolution stating that "RCA members with positions in Orthodox institutions may not ordain women into the Orthodox rabbinate, regardless of the title used; or hire or ratify the hiring of a woman into a rabbinic position at an Orthodox institution; or allow a title implying rabbinic ordination to be used by a teacher of Limudei Kodesh in an Orthodox institution." That same year, Agudath Israel of America similarly condemned Maharat, denouncing moves to ordain women, and went even further, declaring Yeshivat Maharat, Open Orthodoxy, Yeshivat Chovevei Torah, and other affiliated entities to be similar to other dissident movements throughout Jewish history, in having from their perspective rejected basic tenets of Judaism.

In protest of the wider Orthodox community refusing to allow the ordination of women, Rabbi Weiss abruptly resigned from the Rabbinical Council of America. Similarly, Rabbi Asher Lopatin also resigned in protest of the RCA resolution. Rabbi Seth Farber, an Open Orthodox rabbi, protested against the RCA's unequivocal condemnation of Open Orthodoxy, calling it a "PR stunt by the right-wing membership of the RCA in order to further deepen the dividing lines among orthodoxy," and alleged, that he believed the RCA leadership did not support the resolution.

== Academics ==
The rabbinical students may complete an optional year of mekhina (preparation) through the Beit Midrash Program before participating in one of Maharat's ordination programs:

- Core Semikha Program
- Advanced Kollel: Executive Ordination Track (sunsetted in 2025)
- Tehila (joint program with Ein Hanatziv in Israel)

== History of Open Orthodox women rabbis ==
The word "Maharat" comes from the four core values of the institution, decided upon at the semikha (originally called "the conferral") of Rabba Sara Hurwitz. Hurwitz, whose title changed several months into her service at the Hebrew Institute of Riverdale, landed on her first title after discussions with Blu Greenberg who had previously published a now-famous article titled “Will There Be Orthodox Women Rabbis?” (1984). Later, in 2010, Hurwitz and Weiss changed her title to "Rabba" when it became clear that many people did not understand the title.

In response to the controversy, many articles were written in support of women taking Judaic positions of leadership. The authors include Rabbi Dr. Daniel Sperber, Rabbi Dr. Yoel Bin-Nun, and Rabbi Nahum Rabinovitch among others.

== Publications ==
Students have been published in the Keren Journal, The Times of Israel, BBC Sounds, Tablet Magazine, The Wall Street Journal, EJewish Philanthropy, Jerusalem Post, and many more newspapers and journals, religious and secular.

== Maharat BaAretz ==
A branch of the institute was established in Israel.

== See also ==
- Beit Midrash Har'el
- Hashkafa § Gender roles
- International Rabbinic Fellowship
- Jewish education § Girls' education
- Midrasha / Seminary - Orthodox institution for women's Torah study
- Midrashot offering certifications in Rabbinic-level Halacha:
  - Matan Women's Institute for Torah Studies
  - Midreshet Lindenbaum
  - Midreshet Ein HaNetziv
- Women in Judaism and esp. #Views on the education of women
- Women rabbis
- Women rabbis and Torah scholars § Orthodox Judaism
- Yeshivat Chovevei Torah - the Open Orthodox men's Yeshiva
