= Israel Movement for Reform and Progressive Judaism =

Reform Jewish organization in Israel

- Established: 1971
- Affiliations: World Union for Progressive Judaism, Israel Religious Action Center
- Website: Israel Movement for Reform and Progressive Judaism

The Israel Movement for Reform and Progressive Judaism (IMPJ; Hebrew: התנועה הרפורמית – יהדות מתקדמת בישראל, romanized: Hatnua HaReformit – Yahadut Mitkademet Bisra'el) is the organizational branch of Progressive Judaism in Israel, and a member organization of the World Union for Progressive Judaism. It currently has 40 communities and congregations around the state of Israel, 13 of which are new congregations – referred to as U'faratztah communities – and two kibbutzim, Yahel and Lotan.

== History ==
Some of the earliest Reform rabbis to settle in what would become Israel included Judah Leon Magnes, who was the first chancellor of the Hebrew University of Jerusalem and in 1938 became its president. Meir Elk, who graduated from the liberal Breslau Rabbinical Seminary in Germany (in what is now Wrocław, Poland), founded the Leo Baeck School in Haifa.

The first Reform congregation in Israel, Congregation Har'el, opened in Jerusalem in 1958. A conference open to the public who wished to see a Jewish alternative to the Orthodox movement took place in 1965. This strengthened the relationship between the six existing congregations, and served as the cornerstone for the establishment of the Israel Movement for Progressive Judaism (IMPJ). The IMPJ officially became an organization in Israel in 1971. The Hebrew Union College – Jewish Institute of Religion, the rabbinical college of Reform Judaism, began its Rabbinical Studies program in Israel in 1974, and in 1980, the first Reform rabbi was ordained by the HUC. The headquarters of the World Union for Progressive Judaism moved to Jerusalem in 1973.

As of 2012 there are 40 communities and congregations affiliated with Reform Judaism in Israel. The IMPJ runs about 40 kindergartens; school-run educational programming; Noar Telem, the Reform Movement youth organization, a part of Netzer Olami; the Youth Adult and Students Forum for 20- to 30-year-olds; as well as four Batei Midrash (Jewish study centers). The first Reform kibbutz, Yahel, was founded in 1976 in Arabah, and Lotan was founded in 1983. Har Halutz was established in Galilee in 1985.

The movement has not attracted a significant following among religious Jews in Israel. Researchers attribute this to several factors:

- The political clout of Orthodox Judaism in Israel, which controls the Chief Rabbinate of Israel and is hostile toward other denominations
- The Eastern European or the Middle Eastern origin of most Israelis, populations which are neither strictly religious nor oriented toward religious reform
- The perceived lack of need, in a Jewish-majority state, for Orthodox-alternative organizations.

The IMPJ participates in various initiatives for social justice, such as Rabbis for Human Rights, and it is affiliated with the World Union for Progressive Judaism. In 2012, The Israel Movement for Progressive Judaism officially changed its name to the Israel Movement for Reform and Progressive Judaism. Reuven Marko serves as the chairman of the IMPJ, and Gilad Kariv serves as the executive director.

== Discrimination ==
In June and July 2015, the Reform movement in Israel came under attack by the new minister of religious affairs, David Azulai. The context was the Women of the Wall, an Israeli group fighting for the right of Jewish women to pray at the Kotel (Western Wall) in a fashion incompatible with Orthodox religious norms. In a meeting with MK Ayelet Shaked about that group, Azulai referred to them as "provocateurs" and claimed that Reform Judaism is "a disaster for the nation of Israel". Azulai's comments were condemned by Kariv, who noted, "If Minister Azoulay cannot function as minister for all the citizens of Israel, then he should resign."

In 2016, Likud MK Yariv Levin criticized efforts to accommodate multi-denominational Judaism in Israel. At a government hearing on non-Orthodox prayer space at the Western Wall, Levin slammed Reform Judaism, saying egalitarian prayer space at the Wall is unnecessary based on his opinion that Reform Jews will "be all but gone in three generations". Israeli prime minister Benjamin Netanyahu condemned Levin's remarks and the Reform movement in the U.S. (the largest Jewish religious organization there) decided to shun him. Kariv called on his American partners to refuse access to Levin. Rabbi Richard Jacobs, President of the American Union for Reform Judaism, agreed to cancel all meetings between Levin and Reform leaders. Jacobs told Israeli Army Radio: "There’s no reason to give him a platform in Jewish communities and organizations in the United States. Minister Levin will not teach us what support for Israel is.” The Central Conference of American Rabbis, the North American Reform rabbinical organization, protested Levin's comments, saying "Minister Levin is entitled to his private beliefs. However, as a minister in the government of all Israel, he has an obligation to support the religious practice of all Israelis. His remarks on the supposed waning presence of U.S. Reform Jews reveal a bias against a religious movement that includes over a million and a half people." Informed of Netanyahu's criticism of his comments, Levin refused to backtrack. His office announced: "The tourism minister stands by what he said, and he would likely say it again."

An Israeli court ruling in 2016 prohibited discrimination against Reform Jews in using publicly funded mikvot. The Reform movement's Israel Religious Action Center sued the state on behalf of the Reform and Conservative/Masorti movements to allow members to use publicly-funded mikvot. The case, which took ten years to resolve, resulted in the Israeli supreme court ruling that public ritual baths must accept all prospective converts to Judaism, including converts to Reform and Conservative Judaism. In his 2016 ruling, Supreme Court Justice Elyakim Rubinstein said barring certain converts amounts to discrimination. Until this ruling, Orthodox officials barred non-Orthodox converts from using any mikveh, claiming their traditions do not conform to Jewish law and the people they convert are therefore not Jews. Rubinstein noted: "Once it established public mikvahs and put them at the service of the public – including for the process of conversion – the State cannot but be evenhanded in allowing their use .... The State of Israel is free to supervise the use of its mikvahs, so long as it does so in an egalitarian manner."

== Notable achievements ==
- Kehillat Yozma, a Reform synagogue in Modi'in, is the first non-Orthodox congregation in Israel to receive state funding for its synagogue building.
- Kinneret Shiryon, a Reform rabbi, is the first female rabbi in Israel.
- Alona Lisitsa, a Reform rabbi, is the first female rabbi in Israel to join a religious council, joining Mevaseret Zion's in 2012.

== Institutions and programs ==
The headquarters of the IMPJ are located in The Shimshon Center-Beit Shmuel in Jerusalem.

MARAM – Council of Progressive Rabbis serves as the center of all Reform rabbis in Israel. MARAM had edited prayer books for Shabbat and high holidays, and other publications on Jewish law, prayer, and holidays. MARAM deals with a variety of Jewish topics, and runs a conversion program and the Rabbinical court - Beit Din. As of 2026 Rabbi Benjamin Minich serves as the head of MARAM.

The Israel Religious Action Center (IRAC) was founded in 1987, and serves as the public and legal advocacy arm of the Reform movement in Israel. It focuses on issues of religion and state, including state recognition of Reform Rabbis and Reform conversions. Anat Hoffman served as the executive director of IRAC for over 20 years, with Orly Erez-Likhovski taking over this role in 2024.

The IMPJ Mechina Project is a post-secondary, pre-military year of study and preparation toward compulsory IDF service. Participants in Mechina study Jewish heritage and Israeli identity, and work in community service projects. The IMPJ Mechina takes place in Jaffa.
