= Lesley Sachs =

Israeli social activist, CEO and Artist

- לזלי זקס
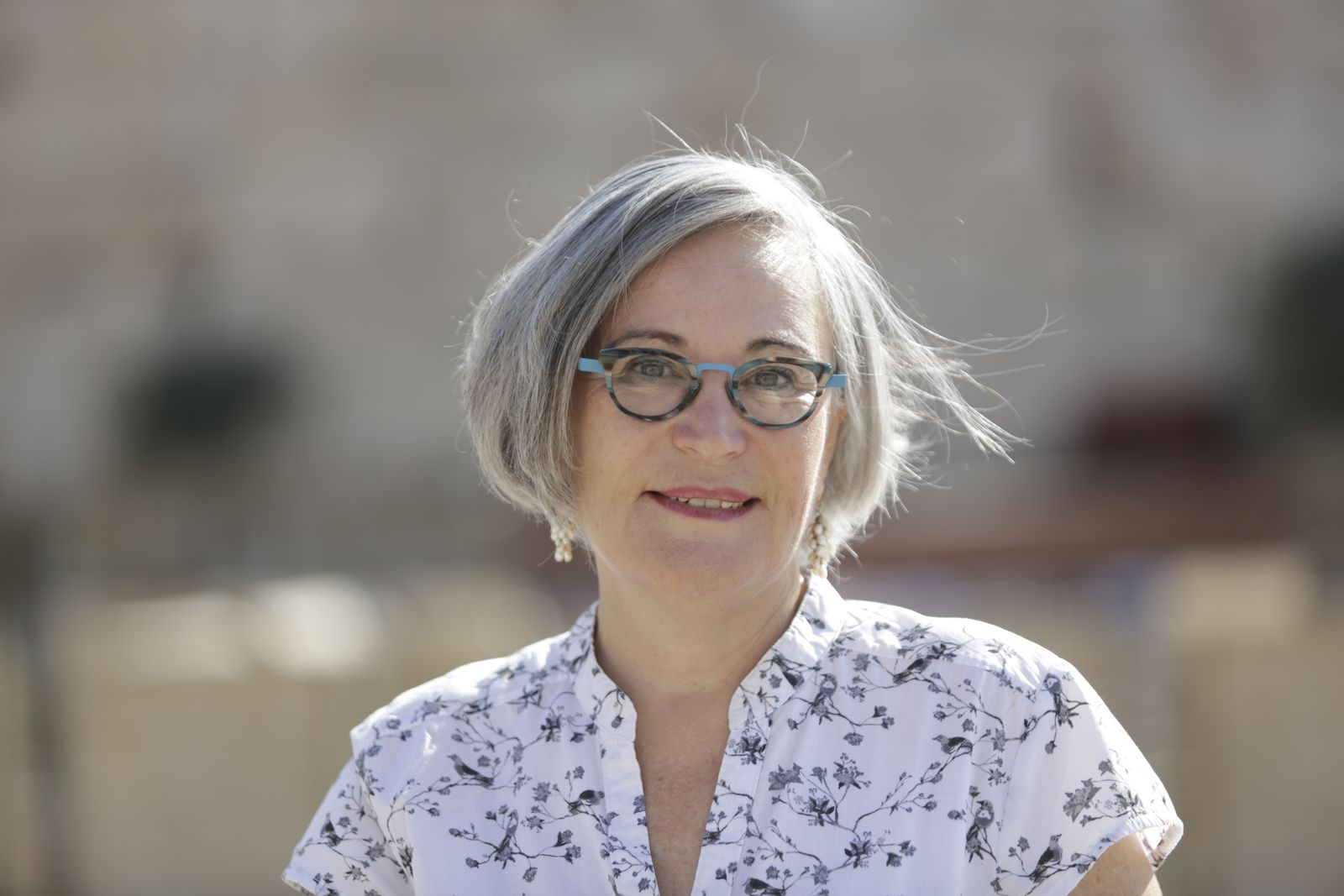
- Sachs in 2017
- Born: Lesley Sachs; August 25, 1958 (age 67); Johannesburg, South Africa
- Education: Haifa University
- Occupations: CEO and artist
- Organization(s): The Israel Women's Network (IWN), the Israel Religious Action Center (IRAC) and Women of the Wall (WOW)
- Website: www.lesleysachs.art

Lesley Sachs (Hebrew: לזלי זקס; born 25 August 1958) is an Israeli social activist, CEO and Artist. She served as the CEO of Israel Women's Network (IWN), Israel Religious Action Center (IRAC), World Union for Progressive Judaism (WUPJ) and Women of the Wall (WOW).

== Biography ==
Sachs was born on 25 August 1958 in Johannesburg South Africa and grew up in Haifa from age five. After concluding her studies at Haifa University, she moved to Jerusalem where she studied hotel management and worked in the field for several years.

After volunteering for a year at the Israel Women's Network, she was appointed as the first spokesperson and PR director of the organization. Four years later she became the CEO. In both roles (1989-1997), she succeeded in bringing the topic of gender equality to the forefront of the Israeli public agenda.

Between 1997-2003 she served as CEO of the Israel Religious Action Center which strove amongst other things, to defend equality, social justice, and religious pluralism within Israel, utilizing the Israeli legal system and lobbying, and through publications.

In 2003 she was appointed as Vice President of the World Union for Progressive Judaism and Director of Beit Shmuel Mercaz Shimshon.

In 2008, Sachs founded "Project Kesher Israel". Its mission is to affect change in Israel by empowering Russian-speaking women to be leaders and activists. These women gain the skills and abilities to subsequently reach deep into the community, build Jewish identity, and influence change on key issues.

Sachs is a social commentary artist working in oil, acrylic and mixed media on canvas. Her style is figurative and realistic and depicts human interactions which reflect inequality and social injustice.

== Women of the Wall ==
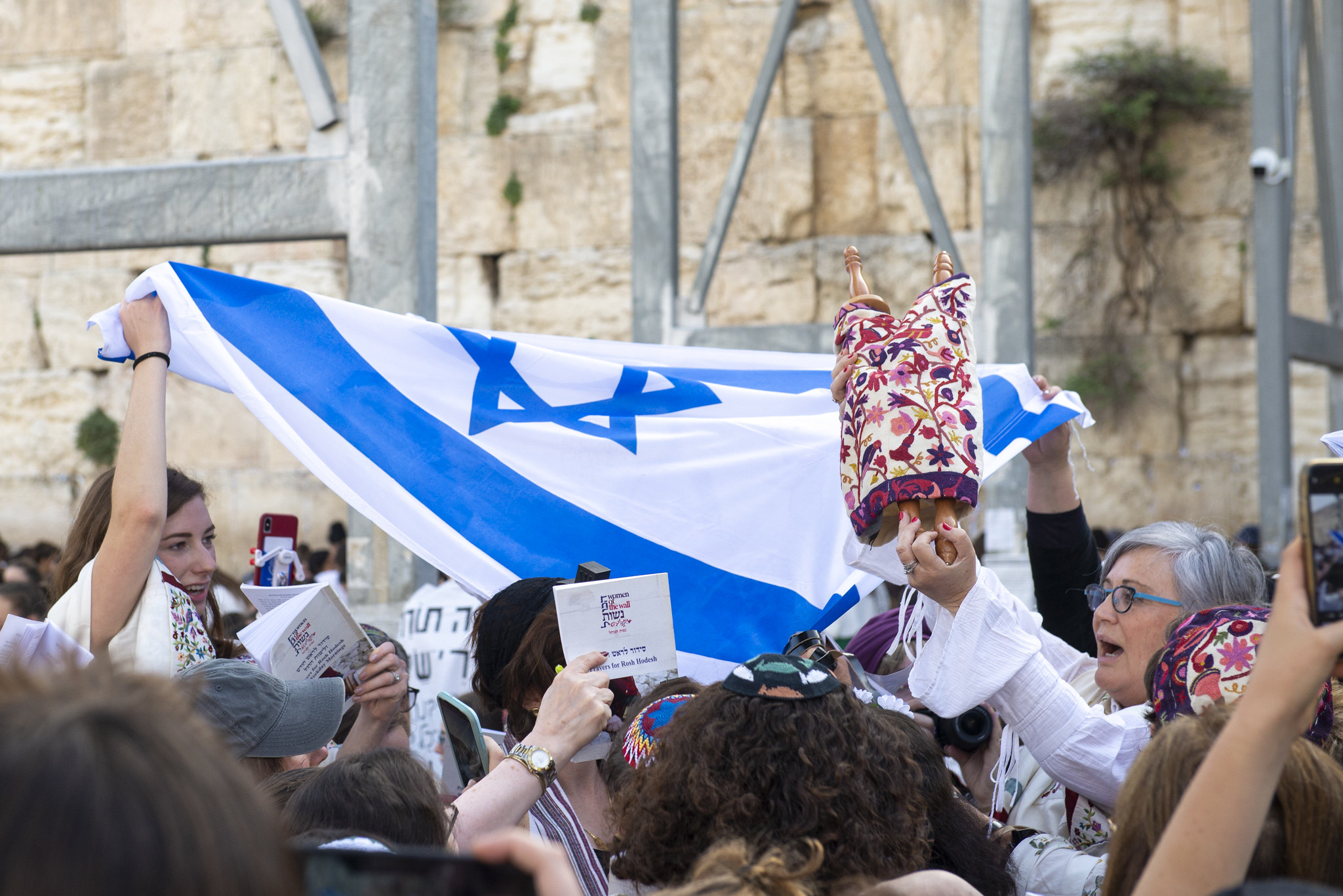
Lesley Sachs holds a Torah scroll at the Western Wall

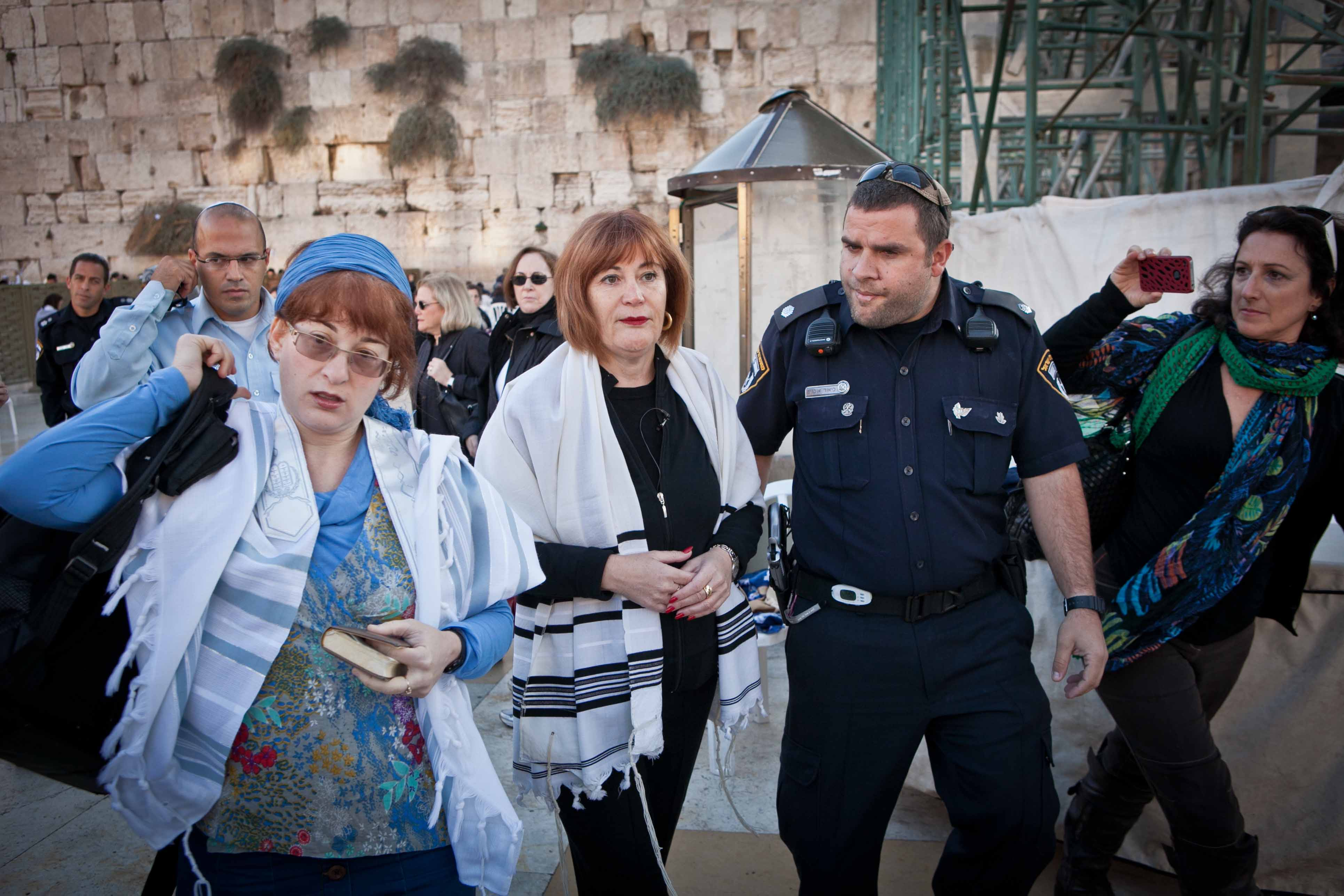
Lesley Sachs, CEO of the Western Wall Women and Rachel Cohen Yeshurun are arrested for wearing a tallit at the Western Wall

In 2008 she was appointed executive director of Women of the Wall. Sachs stood on the front line of a struggle which gained tremendous public attention due to the arrests which began the following year. Sachs was arrested four times for wearing a tallit (traditional prayer shawl) in the women's section of the Western Wall. At her fourth arrest she was brought in front of Justice Moshe Sobel who delivered a precedent-setting verdict which affirmed the legality of Women of the Wall’s prayer at the Western Wall. The arrests then ceased. In 2016 she was arrested again for bringing in and reading from a Torah scroll in the women's section of the Western Wall.

In her position as executive director, she gave hundreds of lectures and presentations in Israel and abroad and was interviewed countless times in the media. In 2014 she spearheaded a campaign posted on public buses, inviting girls to have a Bat Mitzvah ceremony with Women of the Wall and to read from Torah scroll at the Western Wall.

== Volunteer public activity ==
Following her military service, she was one of the first volunteers in the Haifa Rape Crisis Center and one of the founding members of "Isha L'isha Haifa Feminist Center".

In 2014, Sachs was awarded the National Council of Jewish Women’s Jewel Bellush Outstanding Israeli Feminist Award which honored her many significant accomplishments.

Between 1991-1998 she served as a board member in Isha L'eisha Jerusalem women's shelter. From 1999 until 2003 she served as the volunteer chairperson of the International Coalition for Agunah Rights (ICAR). The coalition included 22 women's and liberal religious organizations, working together to change the status of women who have been denied Get (a divorce approved by the Rabbinate).

Sachs also served as Director of the Keren Kayemet LeYisrael, Jewish National Fund.

Sachs presently serves as the Vice Chair of the Israel Movement for Progressive Judaism (IMPJ) and the Chair of the Mechina (one-year, pre-army gap-year) program in Jaffa and Holon.

== Exhibitions ==
Sachs presented her art in several exhibitions including:

- Lesley Sachs: For God's Sake, Stop – solo exhibition, March – May, 2020, Beit Shmueli, Raanana.
- Lesley Sachs: Let Me Hear Thy Voice – solo exhibition, January 2020, Beit Daniel, Tel- Aviv.
- Lesley Sachs: Let Me Hear Thy Voice – solo exhibition, August - November 2020, Beit Shmuel Mercaz Shimshon Jerusalem.
- A group exhibition of sculptors and paintings, August 2016, August 2017, August 2018, Chercove Art Studio, Raanana Theater.
