= David Azulai =

Israeli politician (1954–2018)

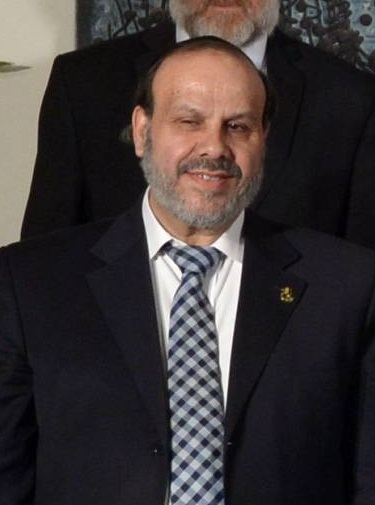
- Azulai in 2015

Ministerial roles
- 2015–2018: Minister of Religious Services

Faction represented in the Knesset
- 1996–2018: Shas

Personal details
- Born: 5 May 1954 Meknes, Morocco
- Died: 30 October 2018 (aged 64)

David Azulai (Hebrew: דוד אזולאי; 5 May 1954 – 30 October 2018) was an Israeli politician who served as a member of the Knesset for Shas for over 20 years from 1996 and 2018. He was also Minister of Religious Services from 2015 until his death in 2018.

== Biography ==
David Azulai was born in Meknes in Morocco, and immigrated to Israel in 1963. From 1973 to 1993, he worked as a teacher and vice principal.

== Political career ==
From 1978 to 1993, he was a member of Acre's local council and served in the municipality's committees. In 1993, he was elected to Nahal Iron Regional Council, serving as deputy mayor of the council and later as its mayor. He resigned following his election to the Knesset in 1996. He served as Chairman of the Internal Affairs and Environment Committee (2000–2001) and as Deputy Minister of Internal Affairs (2001–2003). In the latter post, he was assigned to head of commission regarding the status of the Falasha.

Following the 2015 elections, he was appointed Minister of Religious Services in the new government. He gave up his Knesset seat in March 2018 under the Norwegian Law due to an illness, and was replaced by his son Yinon.

== Controversy ==
In a meeting with MK Ayelet Shaked about Women of the Wall, an Israeli group fighting for the right of Jewish women to pray at the Kotel in their fashion, Azulai referred to them as "provocateurs", and claimed that Reform Judaism is "a disaster for the nation of Israel". Women of the Wall then voiced a protest: "We expect Ayelet Shaked, like her predecessor, to announce unequivocally that as a woman and a justice minister, she will not sign discriminatory regulations, and will not be a part of exclusion of women from the Western Wall or from any other place. The court has already ruled that these regulations are discriminatory and illegal." Azulai's comments were also condemned by Rabbi Gilad Kariv, executive director of the Reform movement in Israel, who noted, "If Minister Azoulay cannot function as minister for all the citizens of Israel, then he should resign."

A month later, in July 2015, Azulai stated: The moment a Reform Jew stops following the religion of Israel... I cannot allow myself to call such a person a Jew."

== Death ==
On 30 October 2018, Azulai died after a long-term battle with cancer. The illness had also forced him to resign from the Knesset early in the year. His son Yinon, who succeeded him in Knesset, was among those rumored to be candidates to take Azulai's place as the Israeli Religious Affairs Minister but did not ultimately do so.
