= Renee Rabinowitz =

Israeli-American psychologist and lawyer (1934–2020)

Renee Ginsburg Rabinowitz Wagner
- רנה גינזבורג רבינוביץ וגנר
- Born: Renee Ginsburg; April 7, 1934; Antwerp, Belgium
- Died: May 19, 2020; Jerusalem, Israel
- Other name: Renee Wagner
- Citizenship: United States; Israel
- Education: University of Chicago (MA, PhD); Notre Dame Law School (JD)
- Spouses: Phillip Rabinowitz; Stanley M. Wagner (m. 1991; died 2013)
- Children: 3 Shana Pearl Rabinowitz & Chanina Aaron Rabinowitz
- Scientific career
- Fields: Psychology, Law
- Institutions: University of Indiana; Colorado College

Renee Ginsburg Rabinowitz Wagner (Hebrew: רנה גינזבורג רבינוביץ וגנר; April 7, 1934 – May 19, 2020) was an American-Israeli psychologist and lawyer. She was born to an Orthodox Jewish family in Antwerp, Belgium, but fled with her family to the United States in 1941, following the outbreak of World War II, and grew up in New York City. Her parents were Max Charles Ginsburg and Helena Zimmet. She had one brother named Herbert "Herbie" Ginsburg. She earned a doctorate in educational psychology at the University of Chicago, and a Juris Doctor degree at the University of Notre Dame. She taught psychology at Indiana University, and later served as in-house legal counsel at Colorado College. In 2016, Rabinowitz was included in the BBC 100 Women list of most influential women. In 2017, she successfully sued El Al, after the airline forced her to move her seat on a Newark–Tel Aviv flight at the request of a Haredi Jewish man who refused to sit beside her due to his religious beliefs.

== Early life and education ==
Rabinowitz was born in Belgium on April 7, 1934. Her family fled The Holocaust in 1941. Rabinowitz fled Belgium with her family to France and then Spain. They eventually ended up living in Cuba before emigrating to the U.S. She grew up in New York City, before leaving the city to attend the University of Chicago, where she earned master's and doctoral degrees in educational psychology. Her 1969 Master's thesis was titled The perceived locus of control of the reinforcements among sixth-grade Negro children. Her 1974 dissertation was titled Personal Causation, Role-Taking, and Effectiveness with Peers: A Study of Social Competence in Elementary School Children.

She also earned a Juris Doctor degree from Notre Dame Law School.

== Career ==
Rabinowitz taught psychology at Indiana University. She later served as in-house legal counsel at Colorado College, and as a professional volunteer at the Israel Center for the Treatment of Psychotrauma.

== El Al discrimination lawsuit ==
In December 2015, Rabinowitz was flying business class on an El Al flight from Newark, New Jersey, to Tel Aviv, Israel. After being seated next to a Haredi Jewish man, the man complained to an onboard flight attendant that he did not want to sit next to a woman because of his religious beliefs. As a result, Rabinowitz was forced to move seats. After speaking to Anat Hoffman, director of the Israel Religious Action Center (IRAC), the organization filed a court case on her behalf for unlawful discrimination. IRAC represented Rabinowitz at the trial.

In June 2017, Rabinowitz was awarded 6,500 shekels (about $1,800). The trial also ruled that El Al's practice of requiring unwilling passengers to accommodate Haredi religious mores violated the country's Prohibition of Discrimination in Products law. The court required El Al to update its policy within six months to comply with Israeli discrimination law. After the verdict, IRAC lawyer Riki Shapira Rosenberg said they expected this to be extended to other airlines.

=== Related incidents ===
In 2018, the Israel Religious Action Center attempted to run an advertising campaign reminding Israeli women that they were not required to change seats at the request of men. The proposed advertisements were blocked by the authorities. In the same year, NICE Ltd. CEO Barak Eilam criticised El Al after they forced women to move seats at the request of Haredi men. Speaking about the incident, IRAC said that the incident was a violation of Rabinowitz's court decision.

== Personal life and death ==
Rabinowitz had three children from her first marriage. She was divorced from her first husband in 1986, and married Rabbi Stanley M. Wagner of Denver, Colorado, in November 1990. She gained two stepchildren through her marriage to Wagner. Rabinowitz and Wagner made Aliyah to Israel in 2006, but frequently visited the United States. She lived the final years of her life in an assisted-living facility in Jerusalem. Rabinowitz died on May 19, 2020, in Jerusalem.

== Awards and honors ==
In 2016, Rabinowitz was included in the BBC 100 Women list of most influential women.

== Selected works ==
- Rabinowitz, Renee G. (1978). "Internal-External Control Expectancies in Black Children of Differing Socioeconomic Status". Psychological Reports. 42 (3): 1339–1345. doi:10.2466/pr0.1978.42.3c.1339. S2CID 144061853.
- Rabinowitz, Renee G. (1982). "Applicability of the Freedom of Information Act's Disclosure Requirements to Intellectual Property". Notre Dame Law Review. 57 (3).
