= Sered =

Sered or Sereď may refer to:

- Sereď, a town in Slovakia
  - Sereď concentration camp in Sereď, a Nazi-era labour and transit camp run by the Hlinka Guard
  - ŠKF Sereď, an association football club
- Sered (biblical figure), a minor figure in the Bible
- Susan Starr Sered (born 1955), Professor of Sociology
