= Women of the Wall =

Jewish feminist organization

- נשות הכותל
- Formation: 1988
- Type: Nonprofit
- Purpose: Women's rights advocacy
- Headquarters: Israel
- Region served: Israel
- President: Anat Hoffman
- Website: womenofthewall.org.il

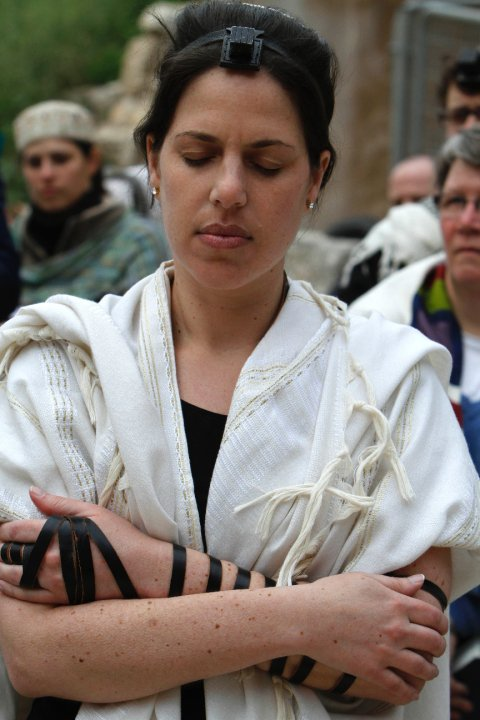
Woman praying at Women of the Wall service wearing a tallit and tefillin

Women of the Wall (WOW; Hebrew: נשות הכותל, Neshot HaKotel) is a multi-denominational Jewish feminist organization based in Israel whose goal is to secure the rights of women to pray at the Western Wall, also called the Kotel, in a fashion that includes singing, reading aloud from the Torah and wearing religious garments (tallit, tefillin and kippah). Pew Research Center has identified Israel as one of the countries that place "high" restrictions on religion, and there have been limits placed on non-Orthodox streams of Judaism. One of those restrictions is that the Rabbi of the Western Wall has enforced gender segregation and limitations on religious garb worn by women. When the "Women of the Wall" hold monthly prayer services for women on Rosh Hodesh, they observe gender segregation so that Orthodox members may fully participate. The group attempted to challenge these rules and establish "female support" for the men's decision, but the Ministry of Justice confirmed that this was not recognized. Their use of religious garb, singing, and reading from a Torah have upset many members of the Orthodox Jewish community, sparking protests and arrests. In May 2013 a judge ruled that a 2003 Israeli Supreme Court ruling prohibiting women from carrying a Torah or wearing prayer shawls had been misinterpreted and that Women of the Wall prayer gatherings at the wall should not be deemed illegal.

In January 2016, the Israeli Cabinet approved a plan to designate a new space at the Kotel that would be available for egalitarian prayer and which would not be controlled by the Rabbinate. Women of the Wall welcomed the decision, but the plan faced opposition from other factions, including some ultra-Orthodox members of Prime Minister Benjamin Netanyahu's governing coalition, who threatened to withdraw over the government's plan to create non-Orthodox prayer space at the Western Wall in deference to the Women of the Wall.

In January 2017, the Israeli High Court ruled that if the government of Israel could not find "good cause" to prohibit women reading from the Torah in prayer services at the Kotel within 30 days, women could do so; they also ruled that the Israeli government could no longer argue that the Robinson's Arch area of the plaza is access to the Kotel. The petition for women to read from the Torah at the Kotel had been brought by a group that split off from the Women of the Wall, calling itself the "Original Women of the Wall".

In June 2017, it was announced that the plan approved in January 2016 had been suspended.

According to Ronit Kampf, the group's struggle has been "the most covered women's issue in the history of the Israeli media."

== Summary ==
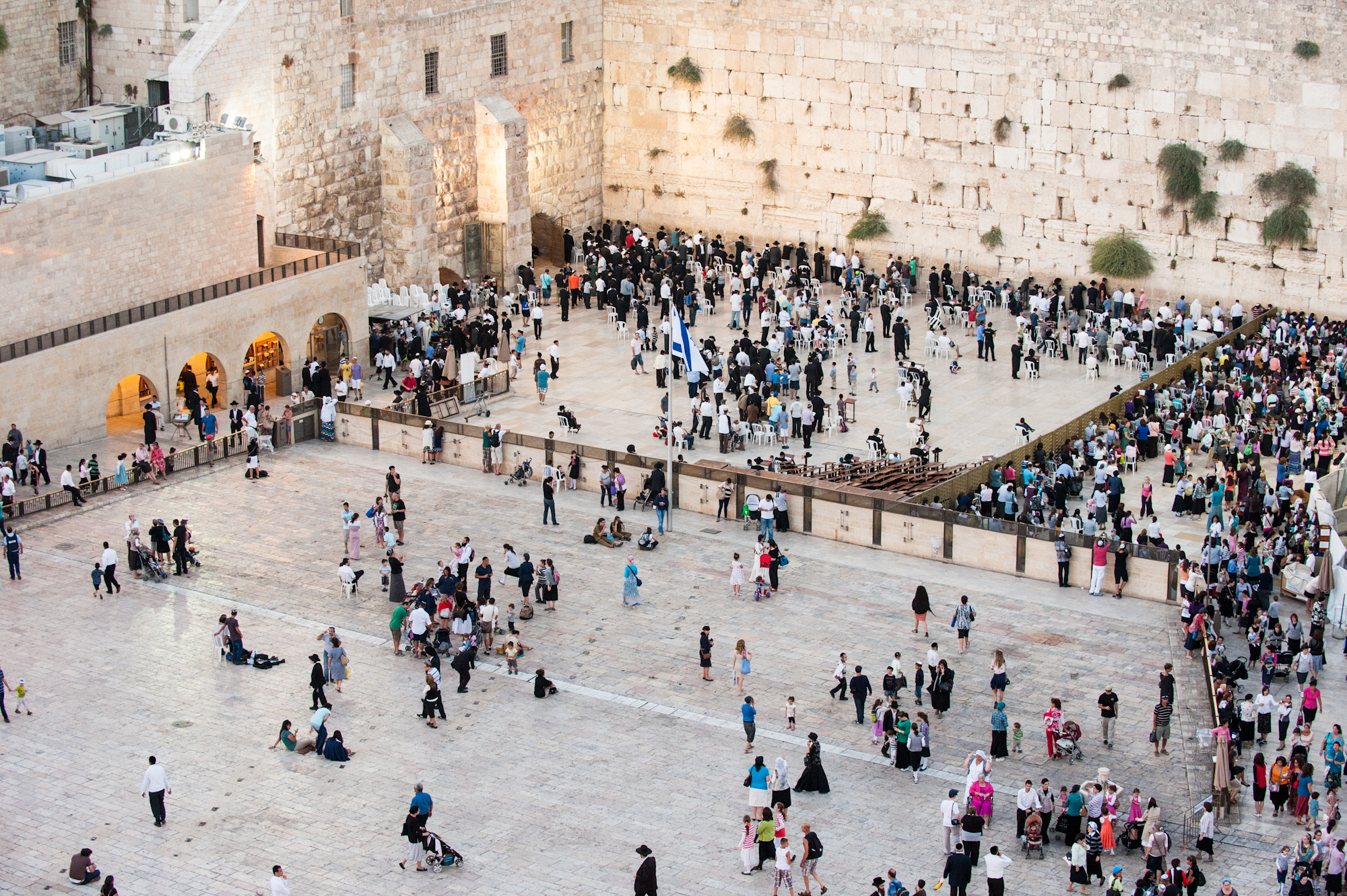
The Western Wall (August 2012)

From the start, Women of the Wall included Orthodox members and opted to claim their service was run according to "Orthodox standards". This was despite the fact that according to orthodox standards, women do not wear tzitzit, tefillin, or read from the Torah. Some Orthodox individuals were offended, including some who call themselves Orthodox feminists. Women of the Wall is a multi-denominational group, including Reform, Conservative and Modern Orthodox members.

Since 1988, the group has faced a legal battle for recognition of their right to pray at the Western Wall. Their presence is deemed offensive by Orthodox worshippers at the site and there have been numerous court proceedings to settle the issue. On the Fast of Esther 1989, Orthodox men, outraged by the women's singing, hurled chairs and verbal insults at the women, which resulted in the deployment of tear gas to quell the violence. In 2010, police arrested two Haredi men at the Western Wall Plaza on suspicion that they threw chairs at a Women of the Wall group that was praying aloud at the site. In 2009, the first woman was arrested for praying with a tallit. The struggle by the Women of the Wall is seen by the Israeli Orthodox religious establishment as an attempt to undermine their influence in an effort to introduce religious pluralism.

Opposition from the Orthodox stems from halachic concerns; this manifests publicly as a general disdain for non-traditional ritual in an area they claim serves as an Orthodox synagogue. Orthodoxy does not permit women to constitute a minyan (prayer quorum) and while the women have not considered themselves as doing so, this has not calmed Orthodox sensibilities. Initially, the group did not receive support from Israel's primarily Orthodox religious authorities. Supporters highlighted the fact that only in Israel are Jewish women prohibited from praying according to their custom in a public location and a 2003 High Court ruling which prevented them from conducting prayer services at the wall was overturned in 2013.

A plan was approved by the Israeli Cabinet in January 2016 to designate a new space at the Kotel that would be available for egalitarian prayer and which would not be controlled by the Rabbinate. In 2017 the Israeli High Court ruled that if the government of Israel could not find "good cause" to prohibit women reading from the Torah in prayer services at the Kotel within 30 days, women could do so; they also ruled that the Israeli government could no longer argue that the Robinson's Arch area of the plaza is access to the Kotel. The petition for women to read from the Torah at the Kotel had been brought by a group that split off from the Women of the Wall, calling itself the "Original Women of the Wall". However, later that year it was announced that the plan approved in January 2016 to designate a new space at the Kotel that would be available for egalitarian prayer and which would not be controlled by the Rabbinate had been suspended. On February 19, 2026 Israel’s Supreme Court ruled that repairs to the egalitarian section of the Wall, promised by the government a decade ago, must begin. Shortly thereafter, the Knesset gave preliminary approval to a bill that any prayer at the Wall violating rabbinate rules would be viewed as “desecration,” punishable by up to seven years in prison. The move threatens the site’s egalitarian prayer section and could strain the relationship with the Reform Judaism, the largest branch of Judaism in the United States.

Some Orthodox feminist organisations have voiced support for their right to pray at the Kotel. The organisation was created by Jewish women, mostly from the diaspora, and a significant number of participants are American immigrants or part of the English-speaking community. This is in part due to the differing social conditions of Orthodox women in the United States and Israel respectively. Shmuel Rosner describes the phenomena as an "American-imported battle" for religious pluralism, religious moderation and tolerance. He has claimed that civil rights and feminism are American imports, late in coming to Israel.

== History ==
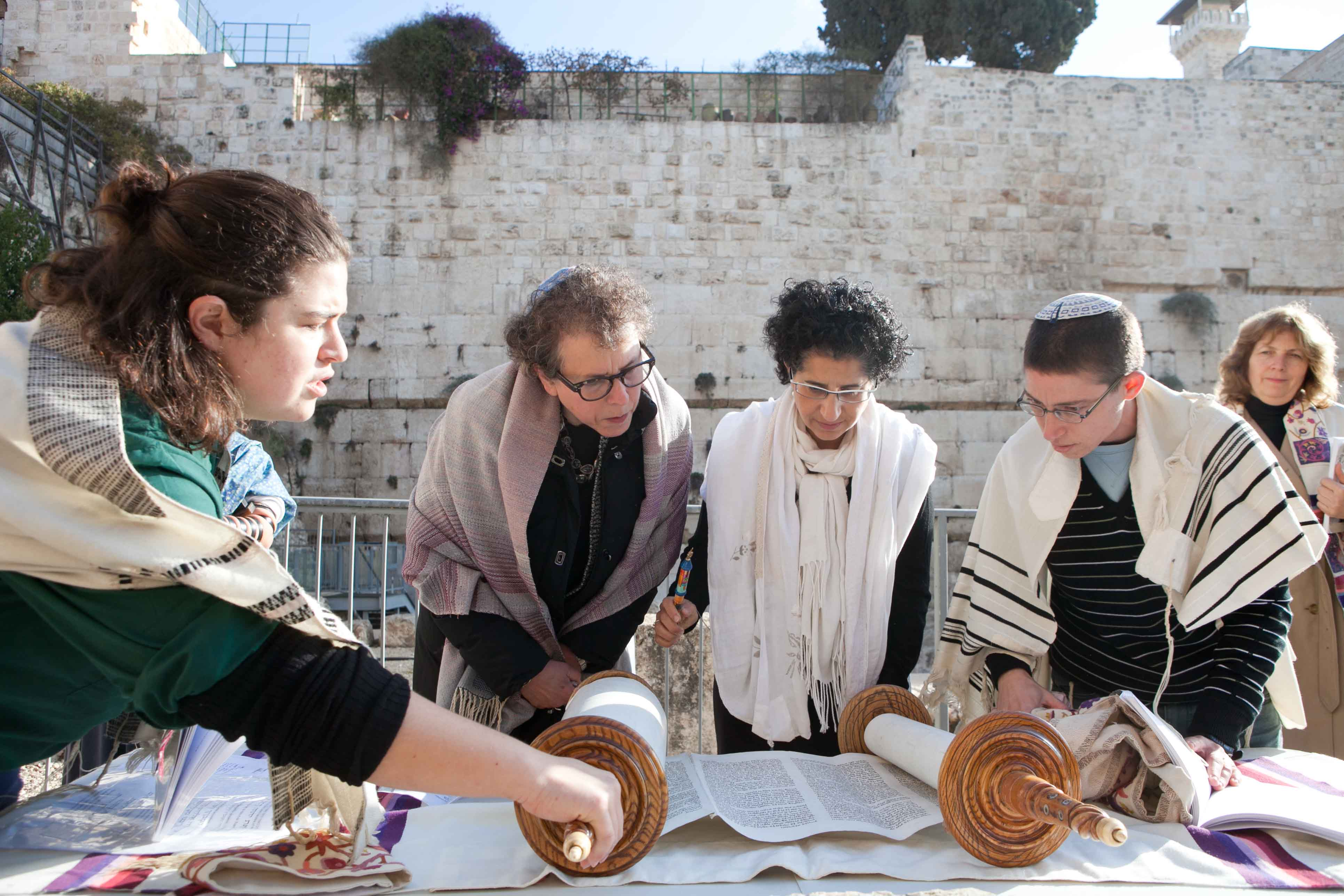
WOW Torah Reading

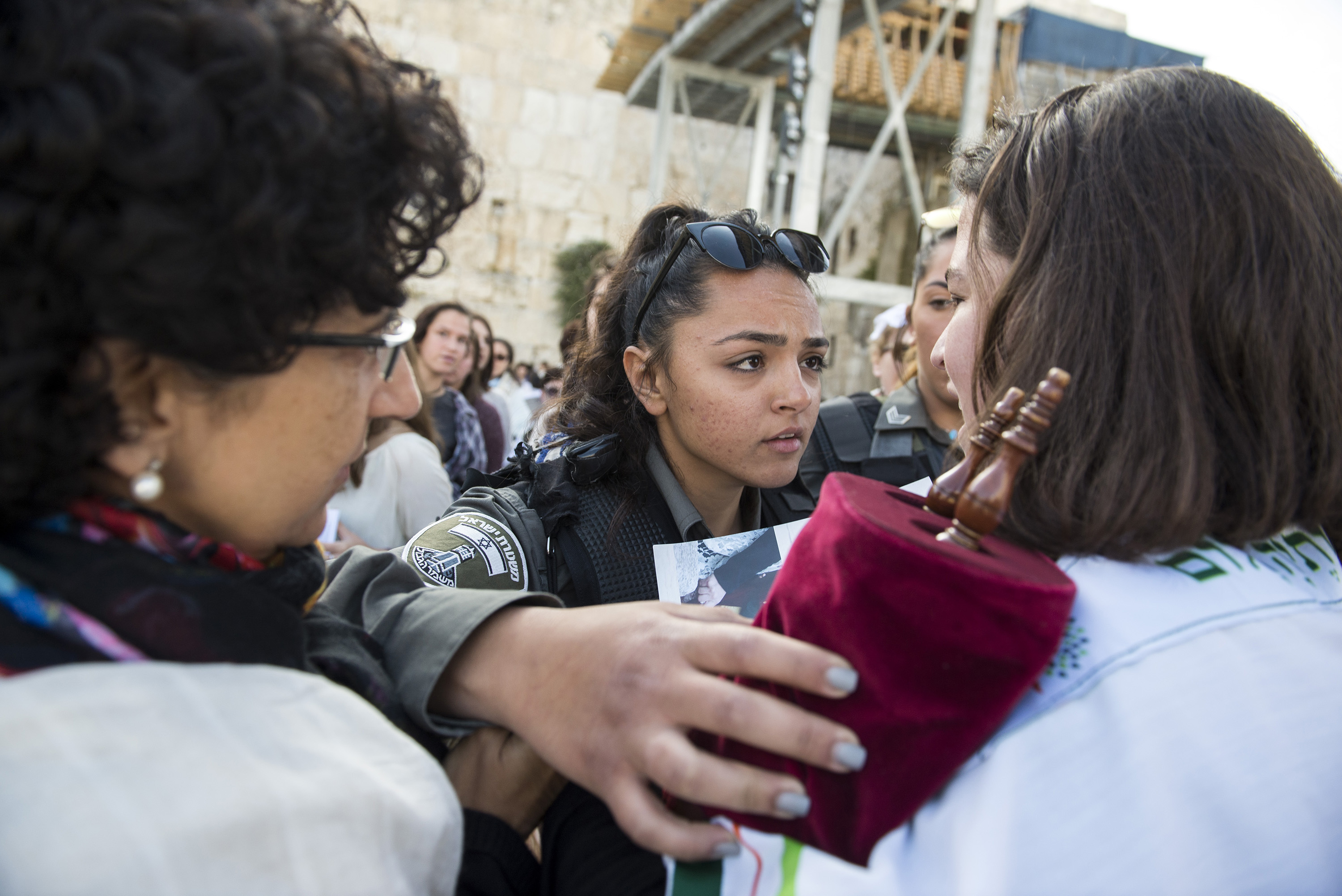
Border patrol conflict with Women of the Wall protestors

Women of the Wall was founded in December 1988 at the first International Jewish Feminist Conference in Jerusalem. On December 1, 1988, during the conference, Rivka Haut organized a group of multi-denominational women to pray at the Western Wall. 70 women carried a Torah scroll to the Western Wall, and Rabbi Deborah Brin led a prayer service for them. Francine Klagsbrun was the one chosen to carry the Torah at the head of the group, making her the first woman to carry a Torah to the Western Wall. When the conference ended, a group of Jerusalem women led by Bonna Devora Haberman continued to meet at the Kotel and formed Women of the Wall to assert their right to pray there without hindrance. Women of the Wall has fought a legal battle asserting a right to conduct organized prayer at the Kotel and challenging government and private intervention in its efforts. After demanding police protection, the government was given nine months to make arrangements that would allow them to pray unhindered. At the end of this period, the Ministry of Religion ruled that only prayer according to the "custom of the place" was to be permitted and that "the sensitivities of other worshippers" must not be offended. The Women of the Wall then petitioned the Supreme Court to recognize their right to pray at the Wall. A temporary ruling was given which stated that the status quo should be enforced until they reached a final verdict.

The legal battles between the High Court of Justice and the Women of the Wall continued between 1995 and 2000. The Israeli government did not uphold the position that they would find a way for the Women of the Wall to pray, which resulted in an appeal from the Women of the Wall to the High Court of Justice in 1995. This concluded in April 1996, determining the solution was to move the Women of the Wall's prayer from the Western Wall to the Robinson's Arch. Robinson's Arch was not in the area of main prayer. The Women of the Wall appealed this decision to the Ne'eman Committee in 1998, who reaffirmed the previous decision of the High Court Justice. The Women of the Wall accepted the decision on the condition that the area they were being moved to be set up to be a proper prayer area. The government did not do such preparations of the prayer area in Robinson's Arch, resulting in the appeal to the Supreme Court in 2000 by the Women of the Wall. In this appeal, the supreme court ruled that the Israeli government was required to allow the Women of the Wall to exercise their religious freedom and practices at the Western Wall.

The struggle has led to two Israeli Supreme Court decisions and a series of debates in the Knesset. In its first decision, on May 22, 2002, the Supreme Court ruled that it is legal for Women of the Wall to hold prayer groups and read Torah in the women's section of the main Kotel plaza undisturbed. Four days later, Haredi political parties including Shas introduced several bills to overturn the decision, including a bill that would have made it a criminal offense for women to pray in non-traditional ways at the Western Wall, punishable by up to seven years in prison. In response MK Naomi Chazan said "What have we become? Afghanistan? Iran?" Although the bill did not pass, the Israeli Supreme Court reconsidered its earlier decision. On April 6, 2003, the Court reversed itself and upheld, 5–4, the Israeli government's ban prohibiting the organization from reading Torah or wearing tallit or tefillin at the main public area at the Wall, on the grounds that such continued meetings represented a threat to public safety and order. The Court required the government to provide an alternate site, Robinson's Arch. Plans to construct a small prayer site at Robinson's Arch were unveiled in October 2003. WOW leader Anat Hoffman reacted harshly to the plan. "Now we're going to be praying at an archeological site, at an alternative site for the Jews of a lesser degree." The site was inaugurated in 2004.

Until recently, it was illegal for them to do so under Israeli law.

In December 2012, following pressure from non-Orthodox US Jews, Natan Sharansky, the chairman of the Jewish Agency for Israel, was asked by the Prime Minister to find a solution to the dispute. In response to the detentions at the wall in February 2013, Sharansky said "When I listen to the very partial presentation, I am fully with them — when I listen to the other side, I have to accept that they also have logic. We do have to find a solution in which nobody will feel discriminated against." In April 2013, Sharansky suggested constructing a third, egalitarian prayer center at the Wall that is identical in size and standing to the plaza currently controlled by the Orthodox Jews. This attempt was endorsed by the government to solve the controversy of the wall, but in actuality, this arrangement would have led to the emergence of a new conflict. Instead of ending the quarreling by granting women full rights to worship at the existing wall, the women would have had to fight for recognition among the public at their new area. The area for the women would have been located in what is known as the Robinson's Arch site.

In March 2013, three women MKs used their parliamentary immunity to don prayer shawls and join the Women of the Wall in a show of support after 10 women had been arrested the previous month. MK Stav Shaffir (Labour) said "I usually do not wear a tallit, but it is my honor and duty to stand here and protect the rights of all Jews from around the world to pray as they desire and believe." Tamar Zandberg (Meretz) said: "I demand to enter. The extremist stream's interpretation of the Holy Places Law is unacceptable to me, and I refuse to leave the prayer shawl outside. I am a secular woman but I identify with these women's struggle for freedom of expression and religion." Subsequently, a number of MKs condemned their actions. MK Aliza Lavie (Yesh Atid), who herself supports the right of the women to assemble, said she was "shocked" that fellow MKs decided to blatantly disobey the law and ignore Supreme Court rulings. MK Miri Regev (Likud) called the MKs attendance a "provocation" and referred to the groups "anarchistic actions" which had "turned into a national sport among the extreme Left in Israel." MK Uri Ariel (Bayit Yehudi) called the women radicals and suggested that their "gross violations" at the site may lead to civil war.

In May 2013, after bowing to pressure from non-Orthodox diaspora Jews, the government issued a directive for the legal dispute to be solved. A subsequent Appellate Court ruling gave permission for the Women of the Wall to hold services at the site after deciding that their prayer and ritual were not against the "local custom" and since the women did not use physical or verbal violence, they could not be held responsible for any resulting disturbances. The Rabbi of the Western Wall, however, continues to view their presence as a provocation.

Twenty-five years after the founding of WOW, a poll by the Israel Democracy Institute in May 2013 found that about half of the Israel public supports the Women of the Wall, and that men (51.5%) are more inclined to support the women's prayer group than women (46%). The poll was conducted by Professor Tamar Hermann, who noted that Women of the Wall received highest levels of support from educated, secular, Ashkenazi Israelis. However, the group was not always met with support from the majority of Israelis, as it is today. They have the support of large American non-Orthodox denominations, which view the issue of women's rights to pray at the Wall as a high-profile opportunity to promote gender-egalitarian Jewish prayer, which most Israelis have never experienced. They also want to remove the control of the holy site from the hands of the Western Wall rabbi.

The arrests have been criticized by groups promoting religious pluralism in Israel. The Central Conference of American Rabbis (CCAR), condemned the arrest of Anat Hoffman and called it a "desecration of God's name".

In October 2014, Women of the Wall launched a campaign to encourage girls to have their bat mitzvah services at the Kotel. Unlike most American non-Orthodox Jewish girls, Israeli Jewish girls typically do not celebrate a bat mitzvah by reading from their Torah portion. The ad campaign features girls wearing prayer shawls and holding a Torah scroll in front of the wall. The ad, placed on Israeli buses, has the caption, "Mom, I also want a bat mitzvah at the Kotel!" The Western Wall Heritage Foundation, which is controlled by the Orthodox and oversees events at the wall, not only runs a business of bar mitzvahs for boys that has excluded girls from their offerings, but has refused to permit women to carry Torah scrolls at the wall. Several of the campaign ads were soon vandalized in Orthodox neighborhoods. The ad campaign received international publicity when religious extremists carried out violent attacks in Jerusalem. About fifty Jewish men in the ultra-Orthodox neighborhood of Mea Shearim engaged in hurling rocks and slashing tires of public buses carrying ads for the egalitarian services for girls. On October 24, 2014, a Bat Mitzvah was celebrated by the group at the wall using a miniaturized Torah scroll which they smuggled in. Although the women have won the legal right to pray in their fashion at the wall, Rabbi Shmuel Rabinowitz, the Supervisor of the Western Wall, has refused to allow the women to use the Torah scrolls distributed in the men's section or to bring their own. The group said that a reading from the Torah scroll in the women's section was an historic event.

On December 18, 2014, Women of the Wall held a women's candle lighting at the Kotel. For Hanukkah every year a giant menorah is erected in the men's section of the Western Wall and each night of the eight nights of the festival, male rabbis and male politicians are honored, while women remain in the women's section, where they are able to see the ceremony with some difficulty. At the Women of the Wall ceremony, women brought their personal menorahs. They invited Jews around the world to light a candle for WOW on the third night of Hanukkah. WOW sent a letter to Prime Minister Benjamin Netanyahu requesting a large menorah also be erected in the women's section just as there is one in the men's section, but Netanyahu simply forwarded the letter to Western Wall rabbi Shmuel Rabinowitz, who accused WOW of ulterior motives of trying to change the customs at the Wall. Responding to Rabinowitz' accusation, Anat Hoffman noted: "In his letter, Rabbi Rabinowitz speaks of bringing together and uniting the nation, and yet his actions exclude and discriminate against women as if women are not part of the same nation. Since he was chosen for this public position, Rabinowitz has never invited Women of the Wall or any other women to participate in the ceremonies or to be honored with the lighting of a candle at the Kotel on Hanukkah, despite the fact that women are obligated equally to men in this religious act." Initially, the personal menorahs the women brought to the Kotel were confiscated, but they were returned when police were called.

In April 2015 Women of the Wall participated in reading from a full-size Torah scroll at the organization's service at the Western Wall. One hundred Torah scrolls are kept for the use of the men's side of the Western Wall and male supporters of Women of the Wall passed a Torah scroll across the barrier into the women's section for Women of the Wall's service. | Eyewitnesses reported that as women were reading from the scroll, several ultra-Orthodox men physically attacked WOW's male supporters and then entered the women's section in an unsuccessful attempt to retrieve the Torah scroll. Police intervened and stopped them. Following the Torah reading service, WOW members in the women's section danced with the scroll. "This is the first time that Women of the Wall can stand up and be counted as a part of the public," proclaimed Anat Hoffman, the chair of WOW. "Nothing you could say could tear me away from my Torah." Rabbi Shmuel Rabinovitch, the head of the rabbinic authority of the Western Wall, called the women's Torah reading a provocation and said "the Israel Police and employees of the Western Wall had to work hard in order to avoid bloodshed."

In January 2016, the Israeli Cabinet approved a plan to designate a new space at the Kotel that would be available for egalitarian prayer and which would not be controlled by the Rabbinate. Women of the Wall welcomed the decision. A group calling itself Original Women of the Wall, which includes founding members of WOW and which contends that WOW has broken away from the original and on-going charter of the group. Original Women of the Wall does not agree with the compromise and said its members will continue to hold prayer services at the Western Wall, praying as is their custom, with prayer shawls and tefillin. Palestinian Minister of Waqf and Religious Affairs Youssef Ideiss protested that the proposed egalitarian prayer section at the Western Wall violates the status-quo agreement governing the area.

In March 2016 MK Meir Porush was reprimanded by the Knesset ethics committee in 2016 because they determined that he "deviated radically and blatantly from the accepted way to express oneself in the Knesset or what is appropriate for an MK." In a speech before the Knesset Porush said that the Women of the Wall should be "thrown to the dogs". The committee noted that such "scornful" remarks would be "deplored harshly" had they been spoken about Jews by any other government outside Israel. Porush responded by saying that if "Women of the Wall" refrained from eating non-Kosher food, he would apologize to them.

In 2017 the Israeli High Court ruled that if the government of Israel could not find "good cause" to prohibit women reading from the Torah in prayer services at the Kotel within 30 days, women could do so; they also ruled that the Israeli government could no longer argue that the Robinson's Arch area of the plaza is access to the Kotel. The petition for women to read from the Torah at the Kotel had been brought by a group that split off from the Women of the Wall, calling itself the "Original Women of the Wall". However, later that year it was announced that the plan approved in January 2016 to designate a new space at the Kotel that would be available for egalitarian prayer and which would not be controlled by the Rabbinate had been suspended.

=== Events since the ruling of April 24, 2013 ===
Events since May 2013
Date	New month	Notes	Sources
May 10, 2013	Sivan	In response to the ruling allowing the Women of the Wall to hold their services at the site, between 5,000 and 10,000 Haredi girls converged to prevent the women from approaching. Police in turn offered protection to around 400 women who formed the largest gathering in the group's history. The women prayed together with a group of male supporters, the first time a mixed service had been held by the organisation. They had planned to bring a Torah scroll into the women's prayer section, but reneged upon the request of Minister of Religious Affairs Naftali Bennett. Three Haredi men were arrested for disturbing the peace. Chair of Women of the Wall, Anat Hoffman, said "We are continuing in the footsteps of the paratroopers who liberated the Western Wall." Women for the Wall is founded to campaign against the Women of the Wall.	
May 19, 2013		Threatening graffiti was sprayed on the front door of an executive board member of the Women of the Wall organisation. It read: "Peggy, you're the first. We know where you live. Jerusalem is holy. The Western Wall will not be forfeited. The Women of the Wall are villains." MK Michal Rozin (Meretz) blamed the attack on provocative statements by ultra-Orthodox MKs, and Jerusalem mayor Nir Barkat and his ultra-Orthodox deputy, Yitzhak Pindrus, denounced the act. Rabbi Shmuel Rabinovitch of the Western Wall called it "a despicable incident," which "did not represent Judaism".	
June 6, 2013		It was reported that Chief Rabbis Yona Metzger and Shlomo Amar had received death threats. The letters stated that if the Women of the Wall are not allowed to pray according to their ways and custom, "we will fight you with all measures, and you will return home with 100 bodies of haredim... We will no longer practice restraint. We will re-liberate the Western Wall." Rabbi Shmuel Rabinovitch had also received a similar letter. Women of the Wall said that the organization "had nothing to do with the act and that the style of these letters does not match the love of Israel spirit led by the group."	
July 8, 2013	Av	United Torah Judaism arranged for between 5,000 and 7,000 Haredi girls to assemble at the wall and for the first time in 25 years, police prevented the Women of the Wall from approaching the site. Male protesters numbered around 1,000. The women, numbering around 300, held their service at the entrance to the Western Wall plaza and were occasionally disturbed by shouting and targeted at least twice by water bombs and eggs. An Orthodox man and women were arrested for public order offenses. Gilad Kariv of the Reform Movement in Israel said the police had "given a reward to a small group of Haredi provocateurs and rabbis who deal in spreading baseless hatred." Orthodox Jerusalem deputy mayor Yitzhak Pindrus said "baseless hatred caused the greatest destruction to befall our people and we will not let a small group of agitators to continue to polarise with provocations and baseless hatred."	
August 27, 2013		A temporary platform for non-Orthodox egalitarian prayer was unveiled at Robinson's Arch, the archaeological site adjacent to the Western Wall plaza. Referring to it as a "sunbathing deck", Anat Hoffman criticized it as "second-rate Wall for second-rate Jews."	
October 2014		Women of the Wall smuggled in a Torah scroll to the Western Wall women's section and held their first Torah reading by a woman at the site, which was part of the bat mitzvah of Sasha Lutt. However, Shmuel Rabinowitz, the rabbi of the Western Wall, issued a statement saying in part, "In future, efforts will be made to ensure that this does not happen again, and the introduction of Torah scrolls will be banned for everyone – men and women." Nevertheless, in November 2014 the group celebrated a Bat Mitvah ceremony that included reading from the miniaturized Torah scroll without interference from Shmuel Rabinowitz, the Western Wall rabbi.	
December 18, 2014		Some of the Women of the Wall became the first women to light menorahs at the Western Wall. Specifically, they lit 28 menorahs in the women's section of the Wall. Comedian Sarah Silverman was among those who attended the lighting of the menorahs. However, this event came after the rabbi in charge of the Western Wall had refused a request from Women of the Wall to place a menorah in the women's section.	
April 20, 2015		For the first time, some of the Women of the Wall read from a full-size Torah scroll during the group's monthly prayer service at the Western Wall. Torah scrolls at the Western Wall are normally stored in the men's section, which women are forbidden from entering. But on April 20 a group of male Jewish sympathizers handed a full-size Torah scroll over to Women of the Wall leaders. Some Haredi Orthodox men who had been praying at the Wall attacked the male sympathizers and tried to take the Torah scroll away from the women, but the attacking men were reportedly removed by the police, and the women were able to complete their prayer service.	
January 2016		The Israeli Cabinet approved a plan to designate a new space at the Kotel that would be available for egalitarian prayer and which would not be controlled by the Rabbinate. Women of the Wall welcomed the decision.	
April 24, 2016		Women of the Wall held Passover holiday prayers at the Kotel. However, Israel's attorney general banned them from holding a female priestly blessing ceremony, ruling that a female version of the ceremony would violate a law enforcing "local customs" at religious sites in Israel. Thus they did not hold that ceremony.	
January 2017		The Israeli High Court ruled that if the government of Israel could not find "good cause" to prohibit women reading from the Torah in prayer services at the Kotel within 30 days, women could do so; they also ruled that the Israeli government could no longer argue that the Robinson's Arch area of the plaza is access to the Kotel. The petition for women to read from the Torah at the Kotel had been brought by a group that split off from the Women of the Wall, calling itself the "Original Women of the Wall".	
June 2017		It was announced that the plan approved in January 2016 (see above) had been suspended.	
October 20, 2017	Heshvan	Six-Day War veterans confront Western Wall Heritage Foundation guards at the Dung Gate entrance to the Western Wall and force their way in to the plaza with Women of the Wall's Torah scroll.	
May 15, 2018	Sivan	For the first time in over a year, Women of the Wall held their service outside the metal barricades set up by the Western Wall Heritage Foundation at the far corner of the women's section.	

== Arrests and detainment ==
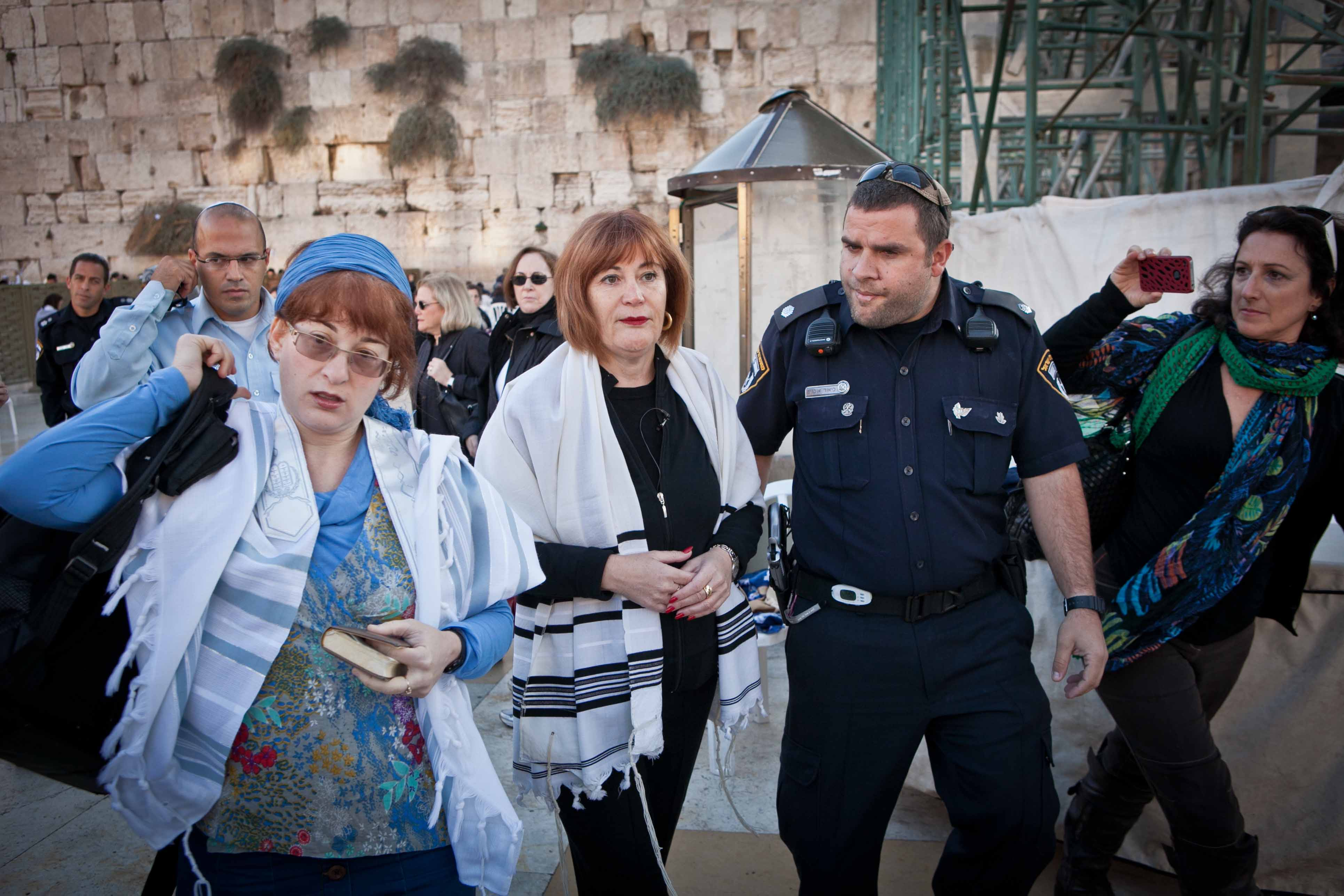
Women detained for wearing prayer shawls

In their struggle for civil rights and religious freedom, members of the group have been willing to engage in civil disobedience and become "prisoners of conscience".

Several members of the group have been arrested for acts that Women of the Wall members say are legal under the Supreme Court ruling. Nofrat Frenkel was arrested for wearing a tallit under her coat and holding a Torah in November 2009. She was not charged, but she was barred from visiting the Wall for two weeks.

The group's leader, Anat Hoffman, was interrogated by the police in January 2010, fingerprinted, and told that she could be charged with a felony over her involvement with Women of the Wall. The questioning concerned WOW's December service, during which Hoffman said she did not do anything out of the ordinary.

On July 12, 2010, Hoffman was arrested for holding a Torah scroll. She was fined 5,000 NIS and given a restraining order according to which she was not allowed to approach the Kotel for thirty days.

On October 16, 2012, Hoffman was arrested again. She was accused of singing out loud and disturbing the peace, and was released from police custody the following day. The following morning Lesley Sachs and board member Rachel Cohen Yeshurun were detained for "disturbing public order". Hoffman described the ordeal: "In the past when I was detained I had to have a policewoman come with me to the bathroom, but this was something different. This time they checked me naked, completely, without my underwear. They dragged me on the floor 15 meters; my arms are bruised. They put me in a cell without a bed, with three other prisoners, including a prostitute and a car thief. They threw the food through a little window in the door. I laid on the floor covered with my tallit. I'm a tough cookie, but I was just so miserable. And for what? I was with the Hadassah women saying Sh'ma Yisrael."

On February 11, 2013, ten women who were part of WOW, including two American rabbis, were detained for praying at the wall and "as a result of them wearing the garments that they're not allowed to wear specifically at that site." The women were barred from returning for 15 days.

On April 11, 2013, five women were detained for allegedly goading and offending other worshippers. They were subsequently released by Judge Sharon Larry-Bavili without restrictions as she ruled that the female worshippers did not instigate the disturbance, but rather it was the male and female Orthodox protestors countering them that initiated it.

In April 2013, a group UK Progressive rabbis protested to the Israeli ambassador calling threats to arrest women saying Kaddish "shocking".

On July 17, 2015, Women of the Wall board member Rachel Cohen Yeshurun was arrested by police in the prayer section of the Kotel after smuggling in a Torah Scroll to the Kotel in the early morning before the Rosh Hodesh service began.

On June 7, 2016, Women of the Wall Executive Director Leslie Sachs was detained by police for 'smuggling' a Torah into the Kotel, and according to a statement released by Women of the Wall detained for 'disturbing the public order'.

On June 14, 2018, several Women of the Wall board members were briefly detained outside the Western Wall plaza by police demanding to see their ID.

== Women of the Wall's position ==
The Women of the Wall have consistently claimed that there is no single "custom of the place" and that their right to pray is a religious freedom enshrined in Israeli law. They believe the Western Wall is a religious site as well as a national site and therefore belongs to the entire Jewish population. They repeatedly stress that the group is not Reform Jews, but come from all affiliations and that their conduct strictly adheres to Orthodox Jewish Law and that their prayer is genuine and not a political stunt. Orthodox Jewish law strictly prohibits women reading from the Torah, and to a lesser degree women wearing tallit and kippahs. Their central mission is to "achieve the social and legal recognition of our right, as women, to wear prayer shawls, pray and read from the Torah collectively and out loud at the Western Wall." The women have made progress and as of 1988, the women have held occasional, uninterrupted prayer services wearing tallitot and tefillin.

== Israeli Ultra Orthodox (Haredi) establishment's position ==
The Israeli Ultra Orthodox Jewish religious establishment is opposed to the services conducted by the Women of the Wall. Ultra Orthodox rabbis claim that even if such a manner of prayer is theoretically permitted by Jewish Law, it is against Jewish custom. Even if support can be found in Jewish legal sources for various activities, the force of custom is equal to absolute law and it is the custom which determines proper conduct. Various legal opinions recorded in Halacha cannot be manipulated to introduce new forms of prayer. The opinion of Rabbi Moshe Feinstein, which is cited by Women of the Wall in support of their cause, is rejected by the establishment, as they view the Women of the Wall as being motivated by feminism rather than a sincere spiritual desire. Their struggle is also seen as an attempt to undermine their influence and as a strategy for non-Orthodox groups to gradually gain official recognition at state level, paving the way for the introduction of religious pluralism in Israel. In a letter to the group, Yehuda Getz, the government appointed administrator of the Western Wall Heritage Foundation, urged them to stop "straying from the hallowed traditions of generations of Jews before you" and in 1989, the Israeli Chief Rabbi Avraham Shapiro and the Religious Affairs Minister suggested that these women "pray individually, silently, and preferably at home – not at the wall."

== Public response ==
From the outset, the Women of the Wall have been subjected to heckling and abuse from male and female Orthodox worshipers. More recently, those who oppose the Women of the Wall have been criticized by Israel's predominantly secular society, which objects not only to the harassment of Women of the Wall but attempts to ban mixing of genders in public places such as buses and sidewalks.

In 1996, UTJ MK Israel Eichler wrote: "No one prevents anyone else from praying at the wall in his own fashion, but the wall is the last place to carry out a battle for the right of a woman to wear a tallit, read from the Torah, wear a kippa and grow a beard." MK Yaakov Litzman stated that "there is no desecration greater than that of women who come to desecrate the holiness of the Western Wall with all kinds of provocations such as carrying a Torah scroll and other things reserved by Jewish law only to men." In 2009, former chief rabbi Ovadia Yosef said: "There are stupid women who come to the Western Wall, put on a tallit (prayer shawl), and pray... These are deviants who serve equality, not Heaven. They must be condemned and warned of." Rabbi Yosef Reinman suggested that it is "not religious need," but rather "religious politics" which motivates the woman. Prominent Orthodox women have also disapproved of the group. Nehama Leibowitz likened their worship to a form of "sport", and the widow of Sephardi Chief Rabbi Mordechai Eliyahu said the group had "gone completely mad" and their actions amount to "desecration". Ultra-Orthodox former Jerusalem city councilwoman Mina Fenton said the women are "a fringe group that attracts people who read the prayer book upside down." The Religious Zionist leadership also voiced its concern in May 2013 when a group of influential rabbis issued a letter calling on public figures "not to let a small group offend the thousands of worshippers arriving to pray at this sacred place on a regular basis." They went on to state that "there are those who have been trying in recent years to change the present situation, offending many and tainting the special atmosphere of holiness of this sacred place."

Disapproval included a wide range of name-calling, such as calling Women of the Wall "witches", "prostitutes", "weird", "childish", and "provocateurs", for wanting to pray in their fashion. The Israeli state and Ministry of Religion referred to Women of the Wall as "witches", who were doing "Satan's work"; "more like prostitutes than women"; "misled, tainted, by modern secular feminism". Yet indifference and condemnation for the women's plight came from all sectors of Israeli society, not just from the religious right. Even liberals saw their actions as a "provocation", and women's organisations in Israel viewed their behaviour as "weird and objectionable". Hillel Halkin called them "childish provocateurs" and Ithamar Handelman-Smith wondered what the Women of the Wall wanted to achieve. Israeli society in general and the secular media were also initially unsympathetic to their cause, possibly reflecting a general hostility to feminism. Susan Sered suggests the public saw the group as "symbolically desecrating Judaism's holiest site" and claims that many in Israel saw the group as "American Reform interlopers trying to appropriate a state symbol of national identity." Their demands were seen as radical and foreign to Israeli society and their actions "alienated Israelis of almost all political persuasions". Consequently, the women at first received minimal grass-roots support. Lahav explains that secular indifference results from an acceptance of the view espoused by the Orthodox establishment when it comes to religious issues and that those on the Left of the political spectrum ignore the women in an attempt to gain Orthodox support for their dovish positions on the Arab-Israeli conflict.

Popular support for the women initially came mainly from Reform and Liberal communities in North America. In 1990, the Central Conference of American Rabbis encouraged its members to support Women of the Wall. In 2000, the Union for Reform Judaism declared it "warmly commends the Women of the Wall for its courageous and principled struggle to be allowed to pray at the Western Wall" and urged Reform congregations to "express solidarity with the Women of the Wall in appropriate ways." Recently, a number of non-Orthodox gatherings and services have been held publicly in America in solidarity with the Women of the Wall.

Within the Reform movement, WOW has faced both support and criticism. Rabbi Gilad Kariv, who is considered the leader of the Reform movement in Israel, argued that WOW's request of 11 hours a year did not indicate an urgency that required a change in policy, but he came to support WOW's goals because they align with the Reform movement's opposition to the exclusion of women from religious society in Israel.

By 2013, however, about half of Israeli Jews approved of Women of the Wall and their mission, with the greatest support coming from secular, educated Ashkenazi Jews. Pollsters for the Israeli Democracy Institute (IDI) and Tel Aviv University surveyed Jews in Israel and found that a clear majority, 64%, of those who defined themselves as secular, and 53% of those who described themselves as traditional but not religious supported the right of Women of the Wall to worship in their fashion. A minority of those who described themselves as traditional religious or Ultra-Orthodox approved. The results showed that overall, 51.8% of men and 46% of women supported Women of the Wall and their right to pray in their fashion at the Wall.

== Scholarly opinions ==
Some Jewish feminist activists in Israel have seen the Women of the Wall's activities as being inconsistent with their political activities. Leah Shakdiel of the anti-war group Women in Black describes the Wall as "all maleness and war". Shakdiel maintains that Israeli society's general opposition to the Women of the Wall is a result of a religious and secular alliance against what they perceive as a feminist challenge. Ran Hirschl believes the conflict is "a contest for cultural hegemony between a secularist-libertarian elite and traditionally peripheral group," namely the ultra-Orthodox community. Frances Raday posits that the violent opposition by Orthodox Jews stems from the "desire of the Orthodox establishment to preserve religious patriarchal hegemony against the challenge of religious feminism," rather than an attempt to preserve Jewish Law itself.

Phyllis Chesler of Original Women of the Wall wrote: "We asked for our rights under civil and religious law. When we prayed, other worshipers, both men and women, verbally and physically assaulted us. We asked the Israeli state to protect us so that we could exercise our rights. The state claimed it could not contain the violence against us, and that we ourselves had provoked the violence by "disturbing/offending" the "sensibilities of Jews at worship". Women are not seen as "Jews" or as "worshipers" with "sensibilities".

== See also ==
- Role of women in Judaism
- Jewish feminism
- Freedom of religion
- Women in Israel
- Sexism in Israel

== Bibliography ==
- Baines, Beverley; Rubio-Marin, Ruth, eds. (2005). The Gender of Constitutional Jurisprudences. Cambridge University Press. ISBN 052153027X.
- Chambré, Susan M. (2002). "Book Review: Women of the Wall: claiming sacred ground at Judaism's holy site". In Nussbaum, Esther (ed.). Jewish Book World, Volumes 20-21. Jewish Book Council.
- Chesler, Phyllis (1996). "Claiming Sacred Ground: Women's eight-year struggle to pray out loud at "the Wailing Wall"". On the Issues.
- Chesler, Phyllis; Haut, Rivka, eds. (2003). Women of the Wall: claiming sacred ground at Judaism's holy site. Jewish Lights. ISBN 1580231616.
- Ben-David, Calev (2003). "The Taming of Israel: American Immigrants to Israel make their mark on Israeli Society by transporting some kinder, gentler, social policies from home". B'nai B'rith, Volumes 118-119. B'nai B'rith International.
- Feldman, Jan Lynn (2011). "Israel: Divided Jurisdiction". Citizenship, Faith, and Feminism: Jewish and Muslim Women Reclaim Their Rights. Brandeis Series on Gender, Culture, Religion, and Law. UPNE. ISBN 978-1611680119.
- Greenberg, Blu (1999). "Feminism, Jewish Orthodoxy and Human Rights". In Gustafson, Carrie; Juviler, Peter H. (eds.). Religion and Human Rights: Competing Claims?. M.E. Sharpe. ISBN 076560261X.
- Haberman, Bonna Devora (2012). Israeli Feminism Liberating Judaism: Blood and Ink. Lexington Books. ISBN 978-0739167854.
- Halperin-Kaddari, Ruth (2004). Women in Israel: A State of Their Own. University of Pennsylvania Press. ISBN 0812237528.
- Hirsch, Ammiel; Reinman, Yaakov Yosef (2002). One people, two worlds: an Orthodox rabbi and a Reform rabbi explore the issues that divide them. Schocken Books. ISBN 0-8052-1140-3.
- Lahav, Pnina (2000). "Up Against the Wall: Women's Legal struggle to Pray at the Western Wall in Jerusalem". Israel Studies Bulletin. Vol. 16. Association for Israel Studies. pp. 19–22.
- Lahav, Pnina (2006). "A Chandelier For Women: A Tale about the Diaspora Museum and Maurycy Gottlieb's "Day of Atonement" – Jews Praying on Yom Kippur". Israel Studies. Vol. 11. Indiana University Press. pp. 108–142.
- Naveh, Hannah, ed. (2003). Israeli family and community: women's time. Vallentine Mitchell. ISBN 0853035059.
- Pogrebin, Letty Cottin (1990). "Why Feminism is Good for the Jews". In Sokoloff, Judith A. (ed.). Na'amat Woman. Vol. 5. Na'amat USA. pp. 3–5 & 28.
- Price, Daniel E., ed. (2012). Sacred Terror. ABC-CLIO. pp. ??. ISBN 978-0313386398.
- Raday, Frances (2007). "Claiming Equal Religious Personhood: Women of the Wall's Constitutional Saga". In Brugger, Winfried; Karayanni, Michael (eds.). Religion in the Public Sphere: A Comparative Analysis of German, Israeli, American and International Law. Springer. pp. 255–97. ISBN 978-3540733553.
- Raday, Frances (2009). "Human Rights and the Confrontation between Religious and Constitutional Authority: A Case Study of Israel's Supreme Court". In Kosmin, Barry Alexander; Keysar, Ariela (eds.). Secularism, Women and the State. ISSSC. pp. 228–232. ISBN 978-0692003282.
- Robinson, Geela Rayzel; Klotz, Miriam (1989). "Reclaiming the Kotel". In Borowitz, Eugene B. (ed.). Sh'ma: A Journal of Jewish Responsibility. Sh'ma Inc. pp. 106–7 & 110.
- Rubel, Nora L. (2010). Doubting the Devout: The Ultra-Orthodox in the Jewish American Imagination. Columbia University Press. ISBN 978-0231141871.
- Satlow, Michael L. (2006). Creating Judaism: History, Tradition, Practice. Columbia University Press. ISBN 0231134886.
- Senate (US) Committee on Foreign Relations, ed. (2005). Annual Report on International Religious Freedom, 2004. Government Printing Office. ISBN 0160725526.
- Sharma, Arvind; Young, Katherine K., eds. (1999). Feminism and World Religions. SUNY Press. ISBN 1438419678.
- Starr Sered, Susan (1999). ""Woman" as Symbol and Women as Agents". In Marx Ferree, Myra; Lorber, Judith; Hess, Beth B. (eds.). Revisioning Gender. Rowman Altamira. ISBN 0761906177.
- Starr Sered, Susan (2000). What Makes Women Sick?: Maternity, Modesty, and Militarism in Israeli Society. UPNE. pp. 138–9. ISBN 978-1-58465-050-8.
- Starr Sered, Susan (2001). "Replaying the Rape of Dinah: Women's Bodies in Israeli Cultural Discourse". In Frankel, Jonathan (ed.). Jews and Gender: The Challenge to Hierarchy. Oxford University Press. ISBN 0195349776.
- Starr Sered, Susan (2010). "Women and Religious Change in Israel: Rebellion or Revolution". In Hertzog, Esther (ed.). Perspectives on Israeli Anthropology. Wayne State University Press. pp. 627–650. ISBN 978-0814330500.
- Skinner Keller, Rosemary; Radford Ruether, Rosemary; Cantlon, Marie, eds. (2006). Encyclopedia of Women and Religion in North America: Native American creation stories. Vol. 2. Indiana University Press. ISBN 0253346878.
- Stevens, Elliot L., ed. (1990). Year Book of the Central Conference of American Rabbis. Vol. 100. Central Conference of American Rabbis.
- Swirski, Barbara; Safir, Marilyn P. (1991). "Living in a Jewish State: National, Ethnic and Religious Implications". In Swirski, Barbara; Safir, Marilyn P. (eds.). Calling the Equality Bluff: Women in Israel. New York: Pergamon Press. pp. 7–17. ISBN 0080374719.
- Swirski, Barbara (1991). "Israeli Feminism New and Old". In Swirski, Barbara; Safir, Marilyn P. (eds.). Calling the Equality Bluff: Women in Israel. New York: Pergamon Press. pp. 285–303. ISBN 0080374719.
- Umansky, Ellen M.; Ashton, Dianne, eds. (2009). Four Centuries of Jewish Women's Spirituality: A Sourcebook. UPNE. pp. 27–28. ISBN 978-1584657309.
- Unterman, Yael (2009). Nehama Leibowitz: teacher and Bible scholar. Urim Publications. ISBN 978-9655240191.
- Woods, Patricia J. (2008). Judicial Power and National Politics: Courts and Gender in the Religious-Secular Conflict in Israel. SUNY Press. ISBN 978-0791473993.
- Yonah, Yossi; Goodman, Yehudah (2004). Marbolet HaZehuiyot: Diyun Bikurti Be'Datiot U'behiloniot Be'Yisrael (in Hebrew). Van Leer.
