= Shachar Kariv =

American economist

- שחר קריב
- Occupations: Economist, professor

Academic background
- Education: B.A. (1998), Tel Aviv University; M.A. (2000), Ph.D. (2003), New York University

Academic work
- Institutions: University of California, Berkeley; Norwegian School of Economics

Shachar Kariv (Hebrew: שחר קריב) is an economist and the Benjamin N. Ward professor of economics and economics department chair at the University of California, Berkeley. He also teaches at the Norwegian School of Economics.

Kariv is an editor of the Review of Economics and Statistics.

Kariv was the chair of the economics department of the University of California, Berkeley from 2014 to 2017 and since 2021 has been chair once more.

Israeli politician Gilad Kariv is his brother.
