= Deborah Brin =

American rabbi

Deborah Brin (born October 8, 1953) is one of the first openly gay rabbis and one of the first hundred women rabbis. She is now the rabbi emerita of Congregation Nahalat Shalom in Albuquerque, New Mexico.

In addition to her education from the Reconstructionist Rabbinical College, Rabbi Brin earned a B.A.in Religious Studies from Macalester College in St. Paul, Minnesota, and a master's degree in Pastoral Counseling from La Salle University in Philadelphia. She co-edited the poetry section for the Reconstructionist prayer book KOL HANESHAMAH: Shabbat Vehagim, and has written an article chronicling her experience leading the first women’s prayer service and Torah reading at the Western Wall for the book Women of the Wall, as well as "The Use of Rituals in Grieving for a Miscarriage or Stillbirth", for the book From Menarche to Menopause: The Female Body in Feminist Therapy.

On December 1, 1988, during the first International Jewish Feminist Conference in Jerusalem, 70 women carried a Torah scroll to the Western Wall, and Brin led a prayer service for them. When the conference ended, a group of Jerusalem women continued to meet at the Kotel and formed Women of the Wall to assert their right to pray there without hindrance.

A 2013 dissertation from the University of New Mexico's department of anthropology, “Storied Lives in a Living Tradition: Women Rabbis and Jewish Community in 21st Century New Mexico,” by Dr. Miria Kano, discusses Brin and four other female rabbis of New Mexico.

In 2014, Brin was named one of PinkNews’s top 11 Jewish gay and lesbian icons.

In 2019, Rabbi Brin was highlighted in the book, Pride: The Story of the LGBTQ Equality Movement edited by Matthew Todd. Originally published in England, it was reprinted in 2020 in the US by Weldon Owen Publishing.
