= Francine Klagsbrun =

Writer and activist

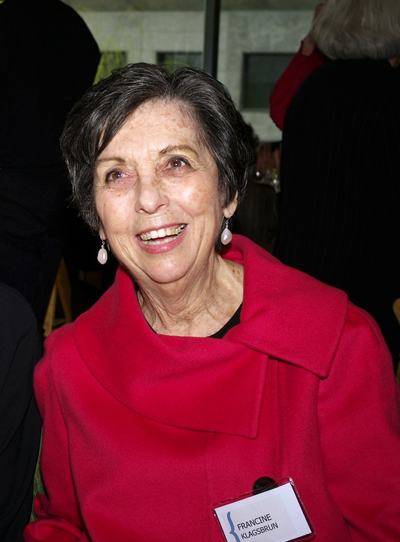
Francine Klagsbrun at the Jewish Women's Archive awards luncheon in 2012

Francine Klagsbrun, born Francine Lifton in 1931, is a writer and Jewish feminist activist. She earned a Bachelor of Arts degree from Brooklyn College, a Bachelor of Hebrew Literature from the Jewish Theological Seminary, and a master's degree in art history from the Institute of Fine Arts. She edited The First Ms. Reader (1973) and Free to Be ... You and Me (1974). Some of her books are Too Young to Die—Youth and Suicide (1976), Married People: Staying Together in the Age of Divorce (1985), and Jewish Days: A Book of Jewish Life and Culture Around the Year (1996).

There was a special commission appointed by the chancellor of the Jewish Theological Seminary of America to study the issue of ordaining women as rabbis, which met between 1977 and 1978, and consisted of 11 men and three women; the women were Francine Klagsbrun, Marian Siner Gordon, an attorney, and Rivkah Harris, an Assyriologist. After years of discussion, the JTS faculty voted to ordain women as rabbis and as cantors in 1983.

In 1988, at the First International Jewish Feminist Conference in Jerusalem, a group of women organized a prayer service at the Western Wall and selected Klagsbrun to carry the Torah at the head of the group, making her the first woman to carry a Torah to the Western Wall. In 1989 she helped dedicate a Torah to the Women of the Wall.

She has served as chairwoman of the Board of Overseers of the Jewish Theological Seminary Library and secretary of the board of trustees of the Jewish Museum and cochair of its exhibitions committee, as well as a member of the Publication Committee of the Jewish Publication Society of America, the Professional Advisory Board of the Petschek National Jewish Family Center of the American Jewish Committee, and the Artistic Advisory Committee of the National Foundation for Jewish Culture.

== Bibliography ==
- Klagsbrun, Francine.

Story of Moses. London, New York, Franklin Watts Ltd. [1971]

- Klagsbrun, Francine.

Read about the sanitation man. Pictures by Allan Eitzen. New York, F. Watts, 1972.

- Klagsbrun, Francine.

Story of Moses. New York, F. Watts [1968]

- Klagsbrun, Francine.

Your health; nutrition, by Francine Klagsbrun and Samuel C. Klagsbrun. Illustrated by Howard Berelson. New York, F. Watts [1969]

- Klagsbrun, Francine.

Read about the parkman. Pictures by Pamela Baldwin-Ford. New York, Watts [1971]

- Klagsbrun, Francine.

Read about the librarian. Illustrated by Dan Nevins. New York, F. Watts [1970]

- Voices of wisdom : Jewish ideals & ethics for everyday living / [compiled by] Francine Klagsbrun.

Boston : D.R. Godine, 1990.

- Words of women / compiled and edited by Francine Klagsbrun.

Chicago : J. G. Ferguson Pub. Co.; New York : distributed by Doubleday, [1975]

- Klagsbrun, Francine.

Freedom now! The story of the abolitionists. Boston, Houghton Mifflin, 1972

- United Press International.

Assassination: Robert F. Kennedy, 1925-1968, by the editors of United Press International and Cowles. Edited by Francine Klagsbrun and David C. Whitney. [New York] Cowles [1968]

- Klagsbrun, Francine.

Married people : staying together in the age of divorce / Francine Klagsbrun. Toronto; New York : Bantam Books, 1985.

- Klagsbrun, Francine.

Mixed feelings : love, hate, rivalry, and reconciliation among brothers and sisters / Francine Klagsbrun. New York : Bantam Books, 1992.

- Klagsbrun, Francine.

Psychiatry: what it is, what it does; a book for young people. Illustrated by Mel Fowler. New York, F. Watts [1969]

- Klagsbrun, Francine.

Read about the teacher. Illustrated by Pat Grant Porter. New York, Watts [1970]

- Klagsbrun, Francine.

Sigmund Freud. New York, F. Watts [1967]

- Voices of wisdom : Jewish ideals and ethics for everyday living / [compiled by] Francine Klagsbrun; illustrated by Mark Podwal.

New York : Pantheon Books, c1980

- Klagsbrun, Francine,

Lioness : Golda Meir and the nation of Israel / Francine Klagsbrun. New York : Schocken Books, [2017]

- Klagsbrun, Francine.

Too young to die : youth and suicide / Francine Klagsbrun. New York : Pocket Books, 1981.

- Klagsbrun, Francine.

Fourth Commandment : remember the Sabbath day / Francine Klagsbrun. New York : Harmony Books, c2002.

- Klagsbrun, Francine.

Jewish days : a book of Jewish life and culture around the year / Francine Klagsbrun; illustrated by Mark Podwal. New York : Farrar, Straus, Giroux, c1996

- Klagsbrun, Francine.

Too young to die : youth and suicide / by Francine Klagsbrun. Boston : Houghton Mifflin, 1976.

- Klagsbrun, Francine.

First book of spices. Illustrated by Penelope Naylor. New York, F. Watts [1968]

== Awards ==
- 2017: National Jewish Book Award in the Jewish Book of the Year category for Lioness : Golda Meir and the nation of Israel
