= Women for the Wall =

Jewish women's organization

Women for the Wall, sometimes abbreviated as W4W, is a grassroots Jewish women's traditionalist organization founded in April 2013, formed in opposition to the Women of the Wall (WoW), a Jewish women's group promoting egalitarian prayer at the Western Wall (the Kotel), the Jewish holy site in Jerusalem.

== History ==
Women for the Wall is a traditionalist group, which favors maintenance of "the status quo at the Western Wall, where rules mandate separation of the sexes and restrict the ability of women to lead public prayer groups," except at Robinson's Gate, a section of the wall for egalitarian prayer that was set aside by the Israel Supreme Court in 2003. W4W was founded in April 2013 by Ronit Peskin, Leah Aharoni, and Jenni Menashe. The group's first event was held on Rosh Chodesh (the first day) of the Hebrew month of Sivan (10 May 2013) with some 5,000–7,000 Jewish women praying traditionally, filling up Kotel plaza, and outnumbering the WoW group. The number of women who pray at Women of the Wall (WoW) services has been estimated to be between 50 and 180.

=== Views ===
Leah Aharoni, the co-founder of Women for the Wall, accuses Women of the Wall with attempting to "manipulate the Kotel for a political agenda" and "engaging in political provocation at a holy site." Aharoni said that "It's unthinkable for a small group to upset tradition against the overwhelming majority." Women for the Wall accuses Women of the Wall of disrupting the prayer of others at the wall. Aharoni described the Robinson's Arch compromise as adequate for egalitarian prayer, writing that it allows "WoW to pray just a few feet down the same exact wall at what is called Robinson's Arch." Anat Hoffman, the chairwoman of the WoW group, has stated that praying in the Robinson's Arch section is unacceptable, likening it to being relegated to the back of the bus, objecting to the notion of "government permission to pray next to the wall," and noting that the Robinson's Arch area "does not have the same amenities and 24-hour accessibility as the Western Wall Plaza." Rabbi Eliana Yolkut states that accepting the Robinson's Arch section for prayer services would be accepting second-class status for non-Orthodox Jews.

Ronit Peskin and Leah Aharoni, founders of Women for the Wall, challenge the idea that traditional women are subjugated; Aharoni has accused WOW of "positioning the traditionally male experience as the only one worth living and setting up women for an ongoing game of catch-up." In response, supporters of WOW, such as Yolkut, have written that WOW supporters are not seeking to "liberate" Orthodox women who are pray as they choose, but to "liberate Judaism from the ties of an Orthodox hegemony" and allow non-Orthodox Jews in Israel "to practice Judaism with equal treatment under the law, even though our way of doing so looks very different."

In response to the creation of Women for the Wall, a spokesman for Women of the Wall said, "WoW works 100 percent in the framework of Jewish law. We are not violating the Torah, and this is not a halachic issue, which numerous prominent rabbis have agreed with. The Western Wall is not an ultra-Orthodox synagogue, it’s a public place – a very important, historic, holy place – but first and foremost, it’s public."
