= Stanley M. Wagner =

American rabbi, academic, and community leader

- Born: January 4, 1932; Brooklyn, New York City, U.S.
- Died: February 23, 2013 (aged 81); Jerusalem, Israel
- Other name: Simcha
- Occupations: Rabbi, academic
- Years active: 1957–2000
- Spouses: Simmy; Renee Ginsburg Rabinowitz (m. 1991; died 2013)
- Children: 2

Academic background
- Education: Yeshiva University (BA, MA, PhD)
- Thesis: Religious Non-Conformity in Ancient Jewish Life (1964)

Academic work
- Discipline: Jewish history
- Institutions: University of Denver

Stanley M. Wagner (January 4, 1932 – February 23, 2013) was an American rabbi, academic, and community leader.

== Early life and education ==
Stanley M. Wagner was born in on January 4, 1932, in Brooklyn, New York City. He attended Yeshiva University where he was ordained in 1956. He earned a doctorate in Jewish history and Hebrew literature and five other post-graduate degrees from Yeshiva. His 1964 doctoral dissertation was titled Religious Non-Conformity in Ancient Jewish Life. It was "a study of talmudic terms and categories for deviant religious behavior."

== Career ==
Wagner worked at universities in Lexington Kentucky (1957–61) and Baldwin, New York (1961–70) before serving as the executive vice president of the Religious Zionists of America (1970–72). He led the Beth HaMedrosh Hagodol-Beth Joseph (1972–97) congregation and was the only rabbi chaplain of the Colorado Senate (1980–98).

While serving as a congregational rabbi, Wagner also worked a professor of Jewish history at the University of Denver from 1972 to 1999. In 1975, at the university, he founded and directed the Center for Judaic Studies, Rocky Mountain Jewish Historical Society, Beck Archives, and the Holocaust Awareness Institute. He founded the Mizel Museum in 1982 and served as the director until 2000.

== Personal life ==
Wagner had two daughters with his wife Simmy. They were married for 34 years before divorcing. In November 1990, Wagner married psychologist and lawyer Renee Ginsburg Rabinowitz. Through this marriage, he gained two stepchildren. Wagner and Rabinowitz made aliyah to Israel in 2006 but they frequently visited the United States. After aliyah, Wagner preferred to be called Simcha. Wagner died on February 23, 2013, in Jerusalem. He was survived by his wife, children, 13 grandchildren, and 14 great grandchildren.

== Selected works ==
- Wagner, Stanley M.; Breck, Allen duPont (1977). Great Confrontations in Jewish History: The J.M. Goodstein Lecture Series on Judaica, 1975 (1 ed.). University of Denver, Department of History. ISBN 0930078055. OCLC 3229778.
- Wagner, Stanley M. (1979). A Piece of My Mind. Ktav Publishing House.
- Jospe, Raphael; Wagner, Stanley M. (1981). Great Schisms in Jewish History. Center for Judaic Studies, University of Denver. ISBN 9780870687112.
- Drazin, Israel; Wagner, Stanley M. (2006). Onkelos on the Torah: Be-reshit. Gefen Publishing House Ltd. ISBN 9789652293428.
- Drazin, Israel; Wagner, Stanley M. (2006). Onkelos on the Torah: Ṿa-yiḳra. Gefen Publishing House Ltd. ISBN 9789652294258.
- Drazin, Israel; Wagner, Stanley M. (2012). Onkelos on the Torah: Understanding the Bible Text - 5 Volume Set. Gefen Publishing House. ISBN 9789652295217.
