= Israel Religious Action Center =

Civil and human rights organization

The Israel Religious Action Center (Hebrew: המרכז הרפורמי לדת ומדינה) also known as IRAC, was established in 1987 as the public and legal advocacy arm of the Israel Movement for Progressive Judaism. It is located in Jerusalem, Israel. IRAC aims to defend equality, social justice, and religious pluralism within Israel, through the Israeli legal system, lobbying and publications. Author Elana Maryles Sztokman calls IRAC "the preeminent civil and human rights organization in Israel," advocating for a broadly inclusive democracy and promoting social justice. Recent campaigns include an effort to ban gender segregation on Israeli public buses, a successful public campaign for the abolition of income guarantees to kollel students, and a lobbying campaign in defense of human rights organizations operating in Israel.

As of May 2024 the executive director is civil rights attorney Orly Erez-Likhovski, who has served with IRAC since 2004. Anat Hoffman, the executive director of IRAC for over 20 years until November, 2022, is also the director and a founding member of Neshot HaKotel, also known as "Women of the Wall" or WoW, an organization of women who pray at the Western Wall in an egalitarian manner. Rabbi Noa Sattath, a leader in gay rights and in Jewish-Palestinian relations, also served in IRAC leadership.

== Areas of focus ==
The Israel Religious Action Center describes its work as:

- Advancing freedom of and from religion
- Ensuring state recognition and equal status for Reform and Conservative rabbis, synagogues, and institutions
- Promoting equality in public
- Advancing racial equality and combating hate
- Strengthening Israel’s democracy
- Protecting the rights of converts and immigrants to become Israeli citizens and enjoy equal rights

== Developments ==
- In 2006 IRAC filed a complaint about racist incitement by Jerusalem rabbis. As a result of the complaint, Shai Nitzan, head of the Special Tasks Division in the State Attorney's Office, ordered a police investigation into possible criminal activity by Rabbi David Batzri and his son, Rabbi Yitzhak Batzri, who in protesting the opening of a mixed Hebrew-Arab school announced that the school was inappropriate because Arabs are "impure" and "donkeys." Attorney Reut Michaeli said IRAC welcomed the investigation in hopes of ending "the improper use that rabbis and others make of the Jewish religion to advance unacceptable, discriminatory and racist views."
- In 2012 IRAC celebrated what Haaretz called "one of its most significant triumphs," when it prevailed in an eight year court battle to have the Israeli government pay the salaries of four non-Orthodox rabbis, "creating a hairline crack in the Orthodox monopoly."
- In 2014, IRAC won its first class-action suit. The Jerusalem District Court agreed that IRAC's client, Kolech could receive damages from Kol baRama, an ultra-Orthodox radio station that prohibits women from participating in its broadcasts or working as employees. Kolech is an Orthodox women's organization.
- In December 2014 the Jerusalem District Court ruled that Chevra Kadisha burial society will no longer be allowed to place signs enforcing gender segregation of men and women at funerals, unless the family of the deceased requests it. The Israel Religious Action Center (IRAC) and the Human Rights Clinic at Tel Aviv University's faculty of law filed a claim against Chevra Kadisha in Rehovot and Jerusalem, claiming it violated the Religious Services Ministry's prohibition on gender segregation in cemeteries. Attorney Orly Erez-Likhovski, head of IRAC's legal department, announced, "This is excellent news. The two Chevra Kadisha companies involved in this affair firmly refused to obey the Ministry of Religious Services director-general's memo which ordered them to remove the signs. This marks the end of discriminating segregation signs in cemeteries." Chevra Kadisha representatives said they were only acting in accordance with rabbinic orders.
- In December 2014 The Times of Israel interviewed Anat Hoffman regarding arson at school that was apparently incited by Lehava and committed by members of the anti-assimilation group. Hoffman said IRAC had filed over 40 complaints "with the attorney general against Lehava and its leaders since 2010, and we only got one serious answer to any of them.” Because of lack of attention to the complaints, IRAC joined other organizations in October 2014 in petitioning the High Court of Justice against the attorney general. The petition asks the attorney general to investigate Lehava, and accuses the group of numerous examples of illegal activity such as promoting housing discrimination against non-Jews and harassing organizations that employ Arabs. The court has allowed the state an extension until January 2015 to file its response.
- In January 2014 the head of IRAC's legal team was quoted in Haaretz about the unsuccessful attempt by the city of Bnei Brak to take down campaign posters that included photos of female candidates. In the city's ultra-Orthodox neighborhoods, women are usually absent from advertisements and billboards because pictures of women are viewed as "sexually provocative". The city's representatives claimed they had been ordered to remove signs picturing Likud contenders such as Miri Regev and Gila Gamliel. The police were summoned and initially supported the city, but then informed city officials the signs could not be removed. City officials protested that they were only trying to protect the sensitivities of religious residents. But Orly Erez-Likhovski, head of the legal department at the Israel Religious Action Center, said this was a victory for gender equality: "“I am very happy that the officials from the Likud didn’t give up, fought the municipality and the police who first arrived on the scene. It shows that the message is starting to penetrate on every level that exclusion of women is illegal and unacceptable. It doesn't always translate to the people on the ground but we see that great progress is being made - even in Bnei Brak, even in the ultra-Orthodox sector. This is an important message.”
- "Rights on Flights": IRAC is acting in response to complaints by airline passengers who have been subjected to Orthodox male passengers attempting to impose gender segregation on flights. IRAC will be drawing on its experience fighting for the rights of women to sit anywhere they choose on public buses as it collaborates with airlines to develop policies to protect the rights of female passengers in the skies. In January 2015, IRAC contacted almost twenty airlines with flights to and from Israel and asked them to meet with IRAC staff so solutions can be developed that protect the rights of female passengers and comply with legal prohibition of gender segregation and gender discrimination. The New York Times interviewed Anat Hoffman on the phenomenon on Orthodox males asking female passengers on airlines to move, noting that IRAC had started a campaign urging women not to give up their seats. “I have a hundred stories,” said Hoffman. In February 2016, 81 year old Israeli-American attorney Renee Rabinowitz agreed to sue El Al as a plaintiff protesting gender discrimination in response to the airline pressuring her to move from her assigned seat to appease a religious male refusing to sit next to a woman. The Israel Religious Action Center was seeking $13,000 in compensation from the airline. On June 22, 2017, Jerusalem Magistrate’s Court Judge Dana Cohen-Lekah awarded Rabinowitz 6500 shekels in compensation, and ruled that the airline must declare that it is forbidden for a crew member to ask a passenger to change seats at the request of another passenger based on gender. Nevertheless, IRAC believes that passengers may still be subject to such requests and planned an advertising program for airports, reminding women of their rights. Israeli authorities refused to let the ads be posted.
- In 2018 the Jerusalem District Court ruled that haredi radio station Kol Barama must pay 1 million NIS in damages, not including legal fees, as a result of a class action suit filed by IRAC and Asaf Pink for not allowing women's voices on the radio station. This is the first class action lawsuit on civil rights and gender segregation in Israel.

== See also ==
- Anat Hoffman
- Hotline for Refugees and Migrants
- Human rights in Israel
- Racism in Israel
- Religious Action Center
- Women of the Wall
