= Gilad Kariv =

Israeli Reform rabbi, attorney and politician

- גלעד קריב
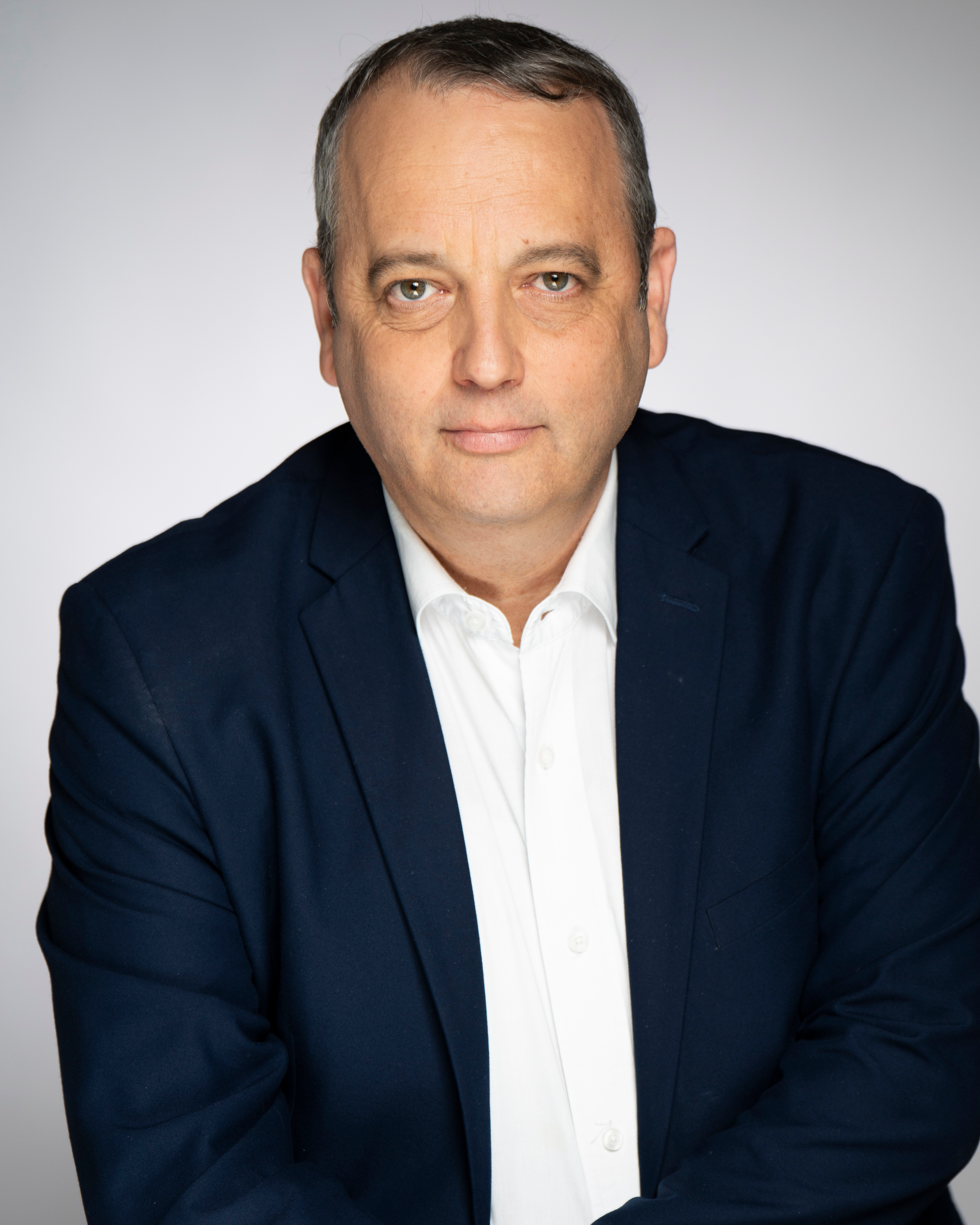

Faction represented in the Knesset
- 2021–2024: Labor Party
- 2024–: The Democrats

Personal details
- Born: 30 November 1973 (age 52) Tel Aviv, Israel

Gilad Kariv (Hebrew: גלעד קריב; born 30 November 1973) is an Israeli attorney, Reform rabbi, and a politician. He is the former CEO of the Israel Movement for Reform and Progressive Judaism and is currently a member of the Knesset for the Democrats and previously for the Labor Party, in the Knesset. He has also served as chairman of the Constitution, Law and Justice Committee of the Knesset during the term of the 36th Government of Israel.

== Personal life ==
Kariv was born and educated in Tel Aviv. His involvement with the Reform Movement began in high school, when he joined the Beit Daniel Synagogue, the Center of Progressive movement in Tel Aviv. Once completing his secondary education at Lady Davis High School, Gilad volunteered for a Service Year in the Hebrew Scouts, and worked on establishing educational Nahal groups.

Kariv served in the Israel Defense Forces Intelligence Corps under the Haman Talpiot program. Following five years of service in the 8200 unit, during which he completed the officers program with honors, reaching the rank of Lieutenant, Kariv went to study at the Hebrew University of Jerusalem. In 2001, he earned a bachelor's degree in law and Jewish studies. In 2001–2002 he interned in the Supreme Court of the State Attorney Office. In 2003, he received a master's degree in Jewish studies at Hebrew Union College in Jerusalem. In 2004, he was certified as a lawyer by the Israel Bar Association. In 2008, Kariv received a master's degree in constitutional law from Northwestern University in Chicago, through a combined program with Tel Aviv University.

During his academic studies, Kariv established Progressive Movement student networks on campuses around the country. Following the economic sanctions of 2002, Kariv was one of the founding members of the Social Organizations Forum, and was active in several social initiatives, such as the single mothers protest. In 2003, Kariv received rabbinic ordination at the HUC. Among his posts, Kariv served as a rabbi at Congregation Beit Daniel in Tel Aviv until 2008.

Kariv lives in Givatayim with his wife and three children. His brother Shachar Kariv is an economics professor.

== Activism ==
Between 2003 and 2009, Kariv served as the director of the Israel Religious Action Center, and headed Reform movement public and legal initiatives in Israel on issues of freedom of religion, relation between religion and state, conversion, and many other social causes. Kariv initiated the establishment of Keren Be'chavod ('Be'chavod Fund) – the Reform Movement's humanitarian aid foundation, and "Kehilat Tzedek" – the training and guidance center for people of all Jewish sects in the field of social action.

In 2009, Kariv was appointed executive director of the Israel Movement for Reform and Progressive Judaism (IMPJ). Since then, he has worked to expand the work of the movement, establish new Reform congregations around the country, and obtain government recognition of the movement's activities. He was replaced by Anna Kislanski after Kariv was elected to the Knesset in 2021.

Kariv publishes opinion pieces in the news and online. He has published several position papers on a variety of topics, including a proposal for the re-organization of religious service provisions in Israel, a suggestion for separation of religious institutions from state bodies, Israeli public space on the Sabbath and a report on the crisis of conversion. Kariv is regularly invited to represent the Reform movement before Knesset committees and in a variety of other public settings. Between 2006 and 2009, Kariv took part in the Knesset Constitution, Law and Justice Committee's discussions over the proposed writing of an Israeli constitution. In these meetings, Kariv represented the liberal Zionist point of view. Together with his colleagues at the IMPJ, Kariv proposed constitutional principles for the State of Israel.

As a representative of the Reform movement, Kariv serves as a board member at the Jewish Federation Institute for Jewish Learning, and as a board member in the Menucha Nechona organization, which works to advance civil burials in Israel. Between 2008 and 2011, Kariv also served as a committee member at the Israel Broadcasting Authority.

Kariv helped lead the efforts to establish an egalitarian praying platform at the Western Wall, resulting in a government resolution officially recognizing the right for egalitarian prayer at the end of January 2016.

== Political career ==
Kariv ran in the 2012 Israeli Labor Party primary elections, winning 27th place on the party's list for the 2013 Knesset election. The party won only 15 seats. In December 2014, he informed Labor Party Chairman Isaac Herzog that he would be running for a spot on the Labor list for the 2015 election.

In January 2021, Kariv ran again in the Labor Party's primary election for the 2021 Knesset election and placed fourth on the party's slate. He was subsequently elected to the Knesset in 2021. As a Member of Knesset, he is vehemently opposed to the police reform proposed by Minister of Interior, Itamar Ben-Gvir.

After the 2022 elections, resulting in the election of the 25th Knesset, Kariv was involved in merging the Meretz and Labor parties into the new party The Democrats. Kariv currently serves as a MK in the 25th Knesset, and heads the Committee for Immigration, Absorption, and Diaspora Affairs. He also serves on the National Security Committee.

In a July 2025 letter to the IDF Chief of Staff Eyal Zamir and the Defense Minister Israel Katz, Kariv has called for the 2023 Gaza war to end, citing the need to return the hostages, the danger to IDF soldiers, and the humanitarian situation in Gaza, specifically calling out the number of Palestinian casualties, stating that thousands of Palestinian children have been killed, and mentioning the destruction of infrastructure in Gaza.

On 30 March 2026, as the bill approving the application of the death penalty by hanging for Palestinians in the West Bank convicted of terrorism was passed 62-48 in the Knesset, Kariv argued against the bill because of its allowance for the application of the death penalty in cases without a unanimous verdict, and because of its being proscribed by international law, saying that it risked turning soldiers and prison staff into “war criminals against their will.”

In May 2026, in a speech at the Knesset, Gilad Kariv accused Prime Minister Benjamin Netanyahu of exaggerating military achievements and misrepresenting the security situation for political purposes. He claimed successes against Hezbollah have not lasted, and that Israel continues to face ongoing security threats, including drone attacks and casualties. Kariv also said the government has failed to properly address threats from Hamas and Hezbollah, and that Israel remains under pressure across multiple fronts, including Gaza, Lebanon, and Iran. He further argued that Israel is in a weaker diplomatic position and has been sidelined in some international negotiations, while internal divisions within Israeli society continue to deepen.

In The Democrats primary elections held on 20 July 2026, ahead of the 2026 Israeli legislative election, Kariv came in at number three on the slate. He was re-elected to the Knesset after the party won eight seats.
