= Kinneret Shiryon =

- כנרת שריון
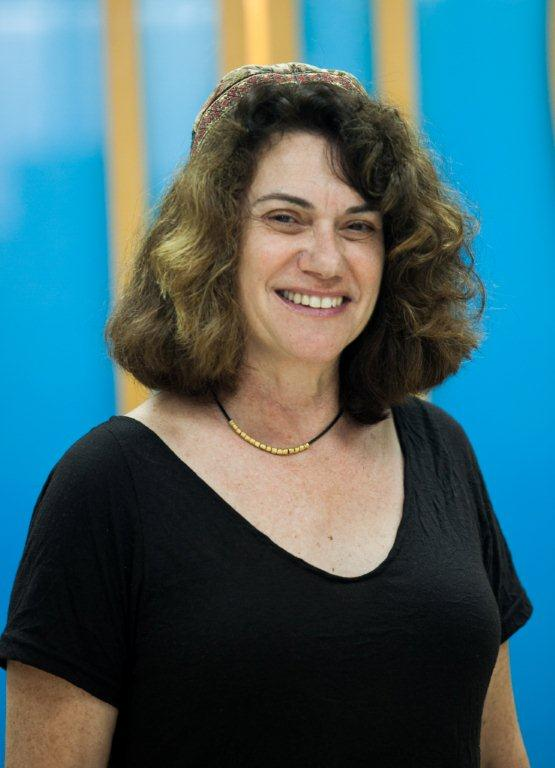

Personal life
- Born: Sandra Levine; 1955 (age 70–71) United States

Religious life
- Religion: Judaism
- Ordination: 1981

Jewish leader
- Organization: Council of Progressive Rabbis in Israel

Kinneret Shiryon (Hebrew: כנרת שריון; born Sandra Levine, 1955 in the United States) is the first female rabbi in Israel. She is the spiritual leader of Kehillat Yozma, Modi'in's Reform congregation, which she helped establish in 1997; Kehillat Yozma is the first non-Orthodox congregation in Israel to receive state funding for its synagogue.

== Career ==
Shiryon was chairwoman of the Council of Progressive Rabbis in Israel (MARAM), as well as one of the rabbis who contributed to the book Three Times Chai: 54 Rabbis Tell Their Favorite Stories. She contributed the story "Challahs in the Ark." She also directed the University Student Outreach programs at UAHC's International Department of Education in Jerusalem.

Shiryon was ordained at Hebrew Union College-Jewish Institute of Religion in New York in 1981. She and her husband Baruch have four children (Ayelet, Erez, Inbar, and Amichai).

The 2022 art exhibit “Holy Sparks”, shown among other places at the Dr. Bernard Heller Museum, featured art about twenty-four female rabbis who were firsts in some way; Heddy Breuer Abramowitz created the artwork about Shiryon that was in that exhibit.
