= Anat Hoffman =

Israeli feminist; founder of the Women of the Wall organization

- ענת הופמן
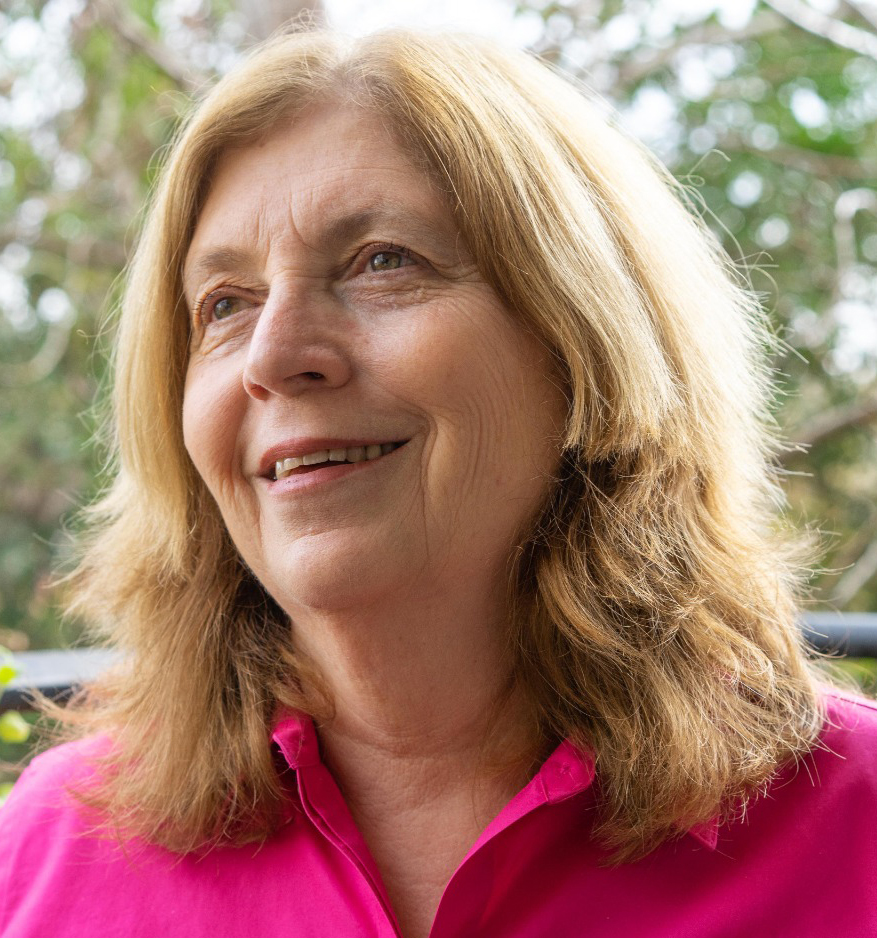
- Hoffman in 2022
- Born: Anat Weiss; April 2, 1954 (age 72); Jerusalem
- Education: UCLA in Los Angeles (BA in Psychology, 1980)
- Occupations: Executive Director, Israel Religious Action Center
- Known for: Social activism

Anat Hoffman (Hebrew: ענת הופמן; born April 2, 1954) is an Israeli activist and the former executive director of the Israel Religious Action Center, also known as IRAC. She is the director and founding member of Nashot HaKotel, also known as Women of the Wall. Hoffman is a former member of the Jerusalem City Council. In 2013, the Israeli newspaper Haaretz named her "Person of the Year", noting the award reflected "the prominence that she has achieved across the Jewish world over the past 12 months".

== Early life and education ==
Hoffman is a sabra born in Haifa in 1954. Her mother, Varda Blechman, was the first child born at Kibbutz Ramat Rachel (Hebrew: רָמַת רָחֵל, lit. Rachel's Heights). Her American-born father, Charles Weiss, served as a Voice of America correspondent in Israel. She attended the Bezalel Academy of Arts and Design. Between 1967 and 1973 she swam competitively and placed consistently among the top female swimmers in Israel. In 1972 she won seven medals in the Israel national championships, including 4 gold. In the 1973 Maccabia Games she won two silver medals. In 1974, after she had completed her service in the Israel Defense Forces, she and her husband at the time, Michael, left for the United States to study. She graduated from UCLA in 1980 with a B.A. in Psychology. While at UCLA, she was connected to Hillel: The Foundation for Jewish Campus Life and started the Israeli Student Organization. She was exposed to Reform Judaism and realized for the first time that Judaism was not limited to Orthodoxy.

She later pursued graduate study at Bar Ilan University.

== Activism ==
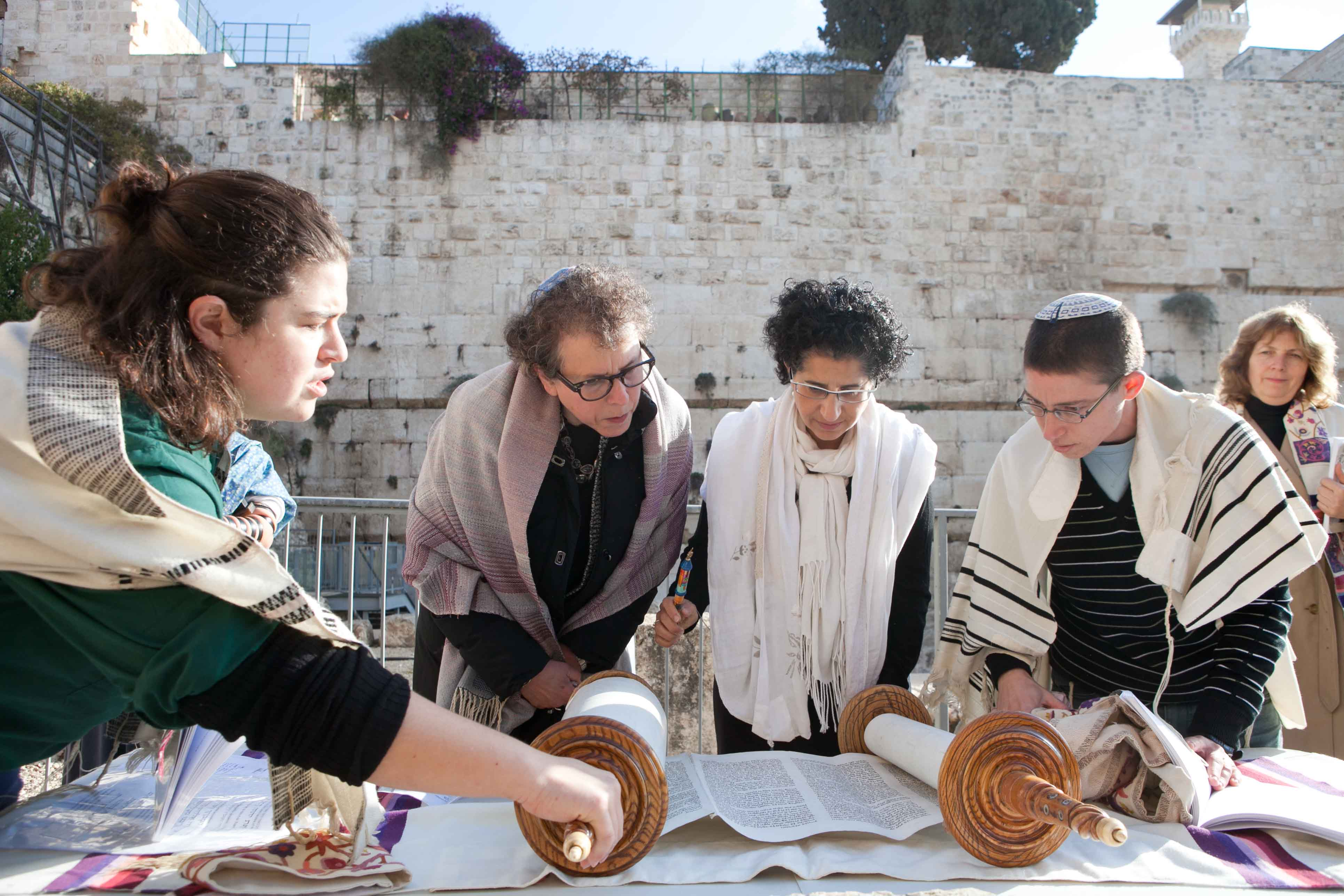
Anat Hoffman observing a WOW Torah Reading

Returning to Israel, she became an activist for religious pluralism, becoming involved in the founding of Kol HaNeshama, a Reform or progressive synagogue in Jerusalem. She served on the Jerusalem City Council from 1988 to 2002, representing the Civil Rights and Peace Movement.

In the late 1980s she led a consumer-rights campaign against Bezeq, the Israeli telecommunications monopoly, over its refusal to offer its customers itemized bills. Hoffman complained, on behalf of consumers, that they were paying for items they had not used. In the end, she prevailed and Bezeq issued itemized bills to customers.

Anat Hoffman is chair of the Domari Society of Gypsies in Jerusalem. Additionally, prior to the 1993 Oslo Accords, Hoffman was the chairwoman of Women in Black, an international women's anti-war movement with an estimated 10,000 activists around the world. The first group was formed by Israeli women in Jerusalem in 1988, following the outbreak of the First intifada.

She was a member of the group that started Women of the Wall in December 1988. Women of the Wall is a group of women from around the world who are working to secure the right to pray in their fashion at the Western Wall, wearing prayer shawls and other religiously significant garments, singing and reading from the Torah collectively. When Israel's Supreme Court ruled in favor of Women of the Wall, Orthodox leaders and rabbis protested the decision. Arrested multiple times for wearing a prayer shawl at the Wall, Hoffman was defended by the Anti-Defamation League, which issued a statement saying that reports of her treatment, at the hands of Israeli police, were especially disturbing.

From 2002 to 2022, Hoffman served as executive director of the Israel Religious Action Center, which was founded in 1987 as the public and legal advocacy arm of the movement for Progressive Judaism in Israel. It is dedicated to promoting equality, justice, religious freedom.

After certain incidents involving female passengers being asked to move seats on flights so Orthodox Jewish men need not sit next to them, Hoffman initiated a campaign encouraging women not to give up their seats for religious sensibilities. She believes airlines are required to comply with non-discrimination laws. Hoffman also opposes state-financed religious councils.

== Recognition ==
In 2013, The Jerusalem Post listed her fifth on its list of 50 Most Influential Jews for forcefully bringing the issue of women's rights at the Kotel to the "forefront of the consciousness of world Jewry".

In December 2024, Anat Hoffman was included on the BBC's 100 Women list.
