= Susan Starr Sered =

Professor of Sociology at Suffolk University

- Born: 1955 (age 70–71)
- Occupation: Professor

Academic background
- Education: University of Chicago (B.A.); Hebrew University of Jerusalem (M.A., PhD)

Academic work
- Discipline: Anthropoligist; sociologist
- Institutions: Suffolk University; Bar-Ilan University

Susan Starr Sered (born 1955) is Professor of Sociology at Suffolk University and Senior Researcher at Suffolk University's Center for Women's Health and Human Rights. Previously, she was the director of the Religion, Health and Healing Initiative at the Harvard University Center for the Study of World Religions, and a Professor of Sociology and Anthropology at Bar-Ilan University, Israel. Her interests include both research and advocacy/activism.

Sered works closely with the Massachusetts Women's Justice Network and other organizations advocating for women's human rights and against mass incarceration.

== Published works ==
Sered is the author of seven books, nearly 100 scholarly articles, and numerous op-eds and shorter articles focusing on women's health, mass incarceration, and a variety of religious issues.

=== Books ===
- Women As Ritual Experts: The Religious Lives of Elderly Jewish Women in Jerusalem, New York: Oxford University Press, (1992)
- Priestess, Mother, Sacred Sister: Religions Dominated by Women. New York: Oxford University Press. 1994. ISBN 978-0-19-508395-8.
- Women of the Sacred Groves: Divine Priestesses of Okinawa. New York: Oxford University Press. 1999. ISBN 978-0-19-512486-6.
- What Makes Women Sick?: Maternity, Modesty, and Militarism in Israeli Society. Brandeis series on Jewish women. Hanover, NH: Brandeis University Press. 2000. ISBN 978-1-58465-024-9.
- Religious healing in Boston : first findings, Ed. Susan Sered and Linda Barnes Cambridge, MA: Center for the Study of World Religions, Harvard University, The Divinity School, (2001)
- Religious healing in Boston : reports from the field, Ed. Susan Sered Cambridge, MA: Center for the Study of World Religions, Harvard University, The Divinity School, (2002)
- Religious healing in Boston : body, spirit, community, Ed. Susan Sered Cambridge, MA: Center for the Study of World Religions, Harvard University, The Divinity School, (2004)
- Religion and healing in America, Ed. Susan Sered and Linda L. Barnes Oxford, New York: Oxford University Press, (2005)
- Uninsured in America: Life and Death in the Land of Opportunity. Berkeley, Calif: University of California Press. 2005. ISBN 978-0-520-24442-9.; with Rushika Fernandopulle
- Can't Catch a Break: Gender, Jail, Drugs, and the Limits of Personal Responsibility. Oakland, California: University of California Press. 2014. ISBN 978-0-520-28278-0.; with Maureen Norton-Hawk

=== Articles ===
- 2013 (with Maureen Norton-Hawk) “Criminalized Women and the Healthcare System: The Case for Continuity of Services,” Journal of Correctional Health Care 19(3): 164-177.
- 2012 (with Maureen Norton-Hawk) “Criminalized Women and Twelve Step Programs: Addressing Violations of the Law with a Spiritual Cure,” Implicit Religion 15(1): 37-60.
- 2011 (with Maureen Norton-Hawk) “Whose Higher Power: Criminalized Women Confront the Twelve Steps,” Feminist Criminology 6 (4): 308-322.
- 2011 (with Marilyn Delle Donne Proulx) “Lessons for Women's Health from the Massachusetts Reform: Affordability, Transitions and Choice,” Women’s Health Issues 21(1): 1-5.
- 2008 (with Amy Agigian) “Holistic Sickening: Breast Cancer and the Discursive Worlds of Complementary and Alternative Practitioners,” Sociology of Health and Illness 30(4): 616-631.
- 2005 Threadbare: Holes in America’s Health Care Safety Net (with Catherine Hoffman), Kaiser Commission on Medicaid and the Uninsured, Washington DC.
- 2002 “Healing and Religion: A Jewish Perspective,” Yale Journal for Humanities in Medicine, special issue “Spirituality, Religious Wisdom, and Care of the Patient.”
- 1999 "'You are a Number, Not a Human Being': Israeli Breast Cancer Patients' Experiences with the Medical Establishment," Medical Anthropology Quarterly 13(3): 223-252.
- 1999 "Talking about Mikveh Parties, or The Discourse of Status, Hierarchy and Social Control" in Rahel Wasserfall, ed. Women and Water: Niddah and Mikveh in Jewish Cultures, UPNE.
- 1995 "Rachel's Tomb: The Development of a Cult," Jewish Studies Quarterly 2(2): pp. 103–148.
- 1988 "Food and Holiness: Cooking as a Sacred Act Among Middle-Eastern Jewish Women," Anthropological Quarterly, 61(3): 129-140.

== Awards ==
- 1993: National Jewish Book Award in the Jewish Thought category for Women as Ritual Experts
