= Joseph B. Soloveitchik =

American Orthodox rabbi, Talmudist, and modern Jewish philosopher

Rabbi Joseph B. Soloveitchik
- Soloveitchik
- Title: The Rav

Personal life
- Born: February 27, 1903; 12 Adar 5663 Pruzhany, Grodno Governorate, Russian Empire (present-day Belarus)
- Died: April 9, 1993 (aged 90); 18 Nissan 5753 Boston, Massachusetts, U.S.
- Buried: Beth El Cemetery, West Roxbury, Massachusetts, USA
- Spouse: Tonya Lewit
- Children: 3, including Haym
- Parent: Moshe Soloveichik (father)
- Dynasty: Soloveitchik dynasty
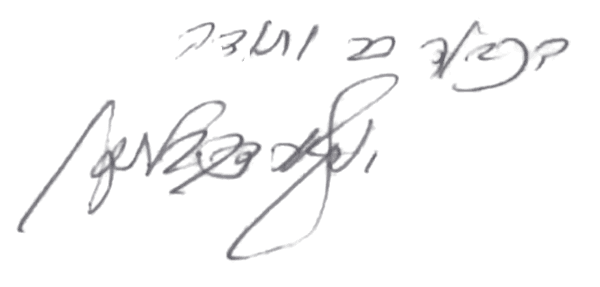
- Signature

Religious life
- Religion: Judaism
- Denomination: Orthodox Judaism

Jewish leader
- Position: Rosh yeshiva
- Yeshiva: R.I.E.T.S.; Maimonides School
- Yahrtzeit: 18 Nissan 5753
- Dynasty: Soloveitchik dynasty

Joseph Ber Soloveitchik (Hebrew: יוסף דב הלוי סולובייצ׳יק Yosef Dov ha-Levi Soloveychik; February 27, 1903 – April 9, 1993) was a major American Orthodox rabbi, Talmudist, and modern Jewish philosopher. He was a scion of the Lithuanian Jewish Soloveitchik rabbinic dynasty.

As a rosh yeshiva of Rabbi Isaac Elchanan Theological Seminary (RIETS) at Yeshiva University in New York City, The Rav, as he was known, ordained close to 2,000 rabbis over the course of almost half a century. Some Rabbinic literature, such as sefer Shiurei Ha-Grid, refers to him as Ha-Grid (הגרי״ד), an acronym for "The Gaon Rabbi Yosef Dov".

He is regarded as a seminal figure by Modern Orthodox Judaism and served as a guide and role-model for tens of thousands of Jews, both as a Talmudic scholar and as a religious leader.

== Heritage ==
Joseph Ber Soloveitchik was born on February 27, 1903, in Pruzhany, Imperial Russia (later Poland, now Belarus). He came from a rabbinical dynasty dating back some 200 years: His paternal grandfather was Chaim Soloveitchik, and his great-grandfather and namesake was Yosef Dov Soloveitchik, the Beis HaLevi. His great-great-grandfather was Naftali Zvi Yehuda Berlin (The Netziv), and his great-great-great-great grandfather was Chaim Volozhin. His father, Moshe Soloveichik (note different spelling of last name), preceded him as head of the RIETS rabbinical school at Yeshiva University. On his maternal line, Soloveitchik was a grandson of Eliyahu Feinstein and his wife Guta Feinstein, née Davidovitch, who, in turn, was a descendant of a long line of Kapulyan rabbis, and of the Tosafot Yom Tov, the Shelah, the Maharshal, and Rashi. Rabbi Soloveitchik's mother, Pesha, was a first cousin of Rav Moshe Feinstein.

== Early years, education, and immigration ==
Soloveitchik was educated in the traditional manner at a Talmud Torah, an elementary yeshiva, and by private tutors, as his parents realized his great mental prowess. According to a curriculum vitae written and signed in his own hand, in 1922, he graduated from the liberal arts "Gymnasium" in Dubno. In 1924, he entered the Free Polish University in Warsaw, where he spent three terms, studying political science. In 1926, he came to Berlin, Germany, and entered the Friedrich Wilhelm University. He passed the examination for supplementary subjects at the German Institute for Studies by Foreigners and was then given full matriculation at the university. He studied philosophy, economics, and Hebrew subjects, simultaneously maintaining a rigorous schedule of intensive Talmud study.

According to the CV, among his "highly honored" teachers in university, bearing the title "Geheimrat" (literally: Privy Counselor), were Heinrich Maier and Max Dessoir, along with Eugen Mittwoch and Ludwig Bernhard. He studied the work of European philosophers, and was a life-long student of neo-Kantian thought. He wrote his PhD thesis on the epistemology and metaphysics of the German philosopher Hermann Cohen.

Contrary to most biographies, which erroneously state that in 1931, he received his degree, he actually passed his oral doctor's examination on July 24, 1930, but graduated with a doctorate only on December 19, 1932, as he had requested an extension to allow him to expand his thesis. Documents exist to support this assertion, located by Marc B. Shapiro in the University of Berlin archives.

In 1931, he married Tonya Lewit (1904–1967), who had earned a PhD in education from Jena University. Chaim Ozer Grodzinski officiated at their wedding in Vilna.

During his years in Berlin, Soloveitchik became a close disciple of Chaim Heller, who had established an institute for advanced Jewish studies from an Orthodox worldview in the city. He also made the acquaintance of other young scholars pursuing a similar path to his own. One such figure was Yitzchak Hutner, who would become the rosh yeshiva of the Yeshiva Rabbi Chaim Berlin, also in Brooklyn, New York. Both of them developed a system of thought that bridged the Eastern European way of traditional scholarship with the new forces of modernity in the Western World. Among the other personalities with whom he came into contact were the Lubavitcher Rebbe, Alexander Altmann, Yehiel Yaakov Weinberg, rector of the Hildesheimer Rabbinical Seminary, and Yeshayahu Leibowitz.

=== Boston ===
In 1932, Soloveitchik emigrated to America and settled in Boston, where he referred to himself as "The Soloveitchik of Boston." That year, he opened a yeshiva known as Heichal Rabbeinu Chaim HaLevi or the Boston Yeshivah. Initially, it mainly served lay people and their children, but starting in 1939, it was augmented by advanced students and staff who had fled the outbreak of World War II in Europe.

Soloveitchik pioneered the Maimonides School, one of the first Hebrew day schools in Boston in 1937. When the school's high school was founded in the late 1940s, he instituted a number of innovations in the curriculum, including teaching Talmud to boys and girls studying in classes together. He involved himself in all manner of religious issues in the Boston area. He was at times both a rabbinical supervisor of kosher slaughtering—shechita—and an educator, gladly accepting invitations to lecture in Jewish and religious philosophy at prestigious New England colleges and universities. Soloveitchik was also the head of Boston's Council of Orthodox Synagogues (also called the Vaad Ha'ir). His son-in-law, Isadore Twersky, was an internationally renowned expert on the writings of Maimonides, and succeeded Harry Austryn Wolfson to the Nathan Littauer Chair of Jewish History and Literature at Harvard University.

=== New York ===
Soloveitchik succeeded his father, Moses (Moshe) Soloveichik, as the head of the RIETS rabbinical school at Yeshiva University (YU) in 1941. He taught there until 1986, when illness kept him from continuing, and was considered the top Rosh Yeshiva—never, however, a formally recognized position at YU—from the time he began teaching there until his death in 1993. He was the first occupant of the Leib Merkin Distinguished Professorial Chair in Talmud and Jewish Philosophy at RIETS.

He ordained over 2,000 rabbis, many of whom are among the leaders of Orthodox Judaism and the Jewish people today. In addition, he gave public lectures that were attended by thousands from throughout the greater Jewish community, as well as regular classes at other New York institutions.

Soloveitchik advocated more intensive textual Torah study for Jewish women at the Stern College for Women, giving the first class in Talmud inaugurated at Stern College. He attracted and inspired many young men and women to become spiritual leaders and educators in Jewish communities worldwide. They, in turn, went out with the education of Yeshiva University to head synagogues, schools, and communities, where they continue to influence many Jews to remain—or become—committed to Orthodoxy and observance.

== Philosophy and major works ==
=== Torah Umadda synthesis ===
During his tenure at Yeshiva University, in addition to his Talmudic lectures, Soloveitchik deepened the system of "synthesis" whereby the best of religious Torah scholarship would be combined with the best secular scholarship in Western civilization. This later became known as the Torah Umadda – "Torah and secular wisdom" philosophy- the motto of Yeshiva University.

However, Rav Ahron Soloveichik disputes this claim, saying: "That the Rav had a positive attitude toward worldly wisdom is beyond question. The same positive attitude towards worldly wisdom was expressed by all the Gedolei Yisrael from Rav Saadia Gaon up to the Gaon of Vilna. A talmid of the G'ra (Note: This popular characterization of Baruch Schick of Shklov is mostly baseless. Schick's ideology and limited connexion to Elijah of Vilna are explored in David Fishman's Russia's First Modern Jews ch. 2 (p. 22ff).) says in the translation of the Euclidean geometry that the G'ra had said 'Ka'asher yechsar lo I'Adam yad achat b'Chochmat haolam kein yechseru lo meah yados baTorah.' If a person is deficient in worldly wisdom he will inescapably be deficient in one hundred measures in Torah wisdom. However, there is a great divergence between having a positive attitude towards worldly wisdom and being committed to mada. Being committed to mada implies a belief that mada is an ikar in life. My brother did not consider mada as an ikar in Yahadut. As a matter of fact my brother never in his lectures mentioned the expression Torah Umada; nor did he ever mention in his essays Ish Hahalacha and Ish Emunah. If anyone who has a positive attitude towards worldly wisdom tries to synthesize Torah with philosophy then Rav Saadiah Gaon, the Chovat Halevavot and the Rambam and the Gaon of Vilna were also attempting to synthesize the Torah with philosophy. Obviously such an allegation would reflect chutzpah and foolish nonsense." He argues that the Rav used his worldly knowledge to enhance his Torah and his teaching, but did not agree that Mada was Ikar that must be synthesized with Torah. (See below "Debate over world view" under "Other views and controversy" for more on this issue.)

Through public lectures, writings, and Soloveitchik's policy decisions for the Modern Orthodox world, he strengthened the intellectual and ideological framework of Modern Orthodoxy.

In his major non-Talmudic publications, which altered the landscape of Jewish philosophy and Jewish theology, Soloveitchik stresses the normative and intellectual centrality of the halakhic corpus. He authored a number of essays and books offering a unique synthesis of neo-Kantian existentialism and Jewish thought, the most well-known being The Lonely Man of Faith which deals with issues such as the willingness to stand alone in the face of monumental challenges, and Halakhic Man. A less known essay, though not less important, is "The Halakhic Mind – An essay on Jewish tradition and modern thought," written in 1944 and published only 40 years later, without any change, as the author himself stresses.

=== The Lonely Man of Faith ===
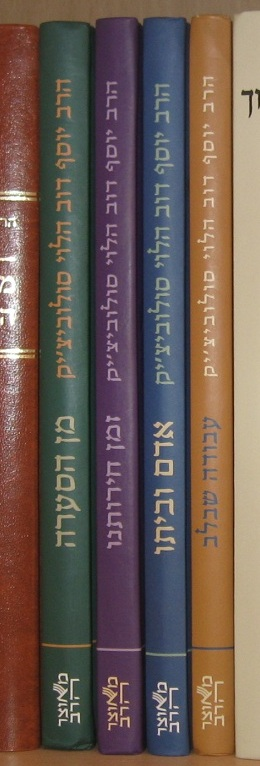
4 books of Joseph B. Soloveitchik

In The Lonely Man of Faith, Soloveitchik reads the first two chapters of Genesis as a contrast in the nature of the human being and identifies two human types: Adam I, or "majestic man," who employs his creative faculties in order to master his environment; and Adam II, or "covenantal man," who surrenders himself in submission to his Master. Soloveitchik describes how the man of faith integrates both of these aspects.

In the first chapter, Adam I is created together with Eve, and they are given the mandate to subdue nature, master the cosmos, and transform the world "into a domain for their power and sovereignty." Adam I is majestic man who approaches the world and relationships—even with the divine—in functional, pragmatic terms. Adam I, created in the image of God, fulfills this apparently "secular" mandate by conquering the universe, imposing his knowledge, technology, and cultural institutions upon the world. The human community depicted in Genesis 1 is a utilitarian one, where man and woman join together, like the male and female of other animals, to further the ends of their species.

In chapter two of Genesis, Adam II, on the other hand represents the lonely man of faith – bringing a "redemptive interpretation to the meaning of existence." Adam II does not subdue the garden, but rather tills it and preserves it. This type of human being is introduced by the words, "It is not good for man to be alone" – and through his sacrifice (of a metaphoric rib), he gains companionship and the relief of his existential loneliness – this covenantal community requires the participation of the Divine.

=== Halakhic Man ===
In Halakhic Man, Soloveitchik propounds the centrality of halakha in Jewish thought. His theological outlook is distinguished by a consistent focus on halakha, i. e., the fulfillment and study of the divine law. He presents the halakha as the a priori basis for religious practice and for the theological foundation for Jewish thought. Soloveitchik emphasizes halakha's "this-worldly, here-and-now grounding," as opposed to religious approaches that focus on the nature of the transcendent realm. This work argues that Jewish piety does not, therefore, fit familiar models of Western religiosity, and presents a phenomenology of this religious type. Here, "Halakhic man," as a result of his study of Torah and his observance of the commandments, develops a set of coherent attitudes towards intellectual activity, asceticism, death, esotericism, mysticism, creativity, repentance, and providence. He also underscores the necessity for individual self-creation as the divinely assigned task of the human being.

Halakhic Man has become well read in the Orthodox Jewish community, but its psychology and model of Jewish law was rejected by most of non-Orthodox Judaism; one of the most prominent critiques is from Abraham Joshua Heschel, who wrote:

Ish Ha-halakhah? Lo haya velo nivra ela mashal haya! [Halakhic Man? Such a Jew has never existed!] Soloveitchik's study, though brilliant, is based on the false notion that Judaism is a cold, logical affair with no room for piety. After all, the Torah does say 'Love the Lord thy God with all thy heart and soul and might'. No, there never was such a typology in Judaism as the halakhic man. There was – and is – an Ish Torah [Torah man] who combines halakhah and aggadah, but that is another matter altogether. When I came to Berlin I was shocked to hear my fellow students talking about the problem of halakha as a central issue. In Poland it had been a foreign expression to me. Halakhah is not an all-inclusive term, and to use it as such is to restrict Judaism. 'Torah' is the more comprehensive word.

=== Halakhic Mind ===
Halakhic Mind is a four-part analysis of the historical correlation between science and philosophy. Only in its fourth and last part does the author introduce the consequences on the Halakha of the analysis performed in the previous three parts.

== Other views and controversy ==
=== Departure from the traditional Brisker view of Zionism ===
Despite their religious disagreements, Soloveitchik was proud of his connections to the Soloveitchik rabbinic dynasty, speaking fondly of his "uncle" Yitzchak Zev Soloveitchik (the "Brisker Rov"). To his relatives and namesakes who now lived in Jerusalem, where they had established their own branch of the Brisk Yeshiva, he was respected for his genius in Talmudic scholarship which few could challenge or disparage, despite their very differing views on Zionism (the "Briskers" in Jerusalem being staunch anti-Zionists); furthermore, they maintain family ties. See the paragraph on "Zionism" below for a discussion of Soloveitchik's Zionist viewpoint. Recent research published by Shlomo Pick indicates that his father Moshe Soloveitchik maintained a close relationship with Religious Zionist (Mizrachi) circles in Warsaw, prior to the father's departure for Yeshiva University and the son's departure for the University of Berlin in 1923.

=== Relations with Agudath Israel ===
After Soloveitchik left Agudath Israel, the organization's leadership was mostly quiet when it came to public statements involving Soloveitchik. Moshe Feinstein, who was Soloveitchik's cousin, maintained very warm and profoundly respectful relations with him. They corresponded and spoke (at least) on the eve of every Jewish holiday. Yitzchak Hutner referred to him as a "gadol" (a foremost Torah scholar of the time). Aaron Kotler, whose public policy in relation to American Jewry was far more right-wing than Soloveitchik's, was introduced by Soloveitchik at a Chinuch Atzmai dinner, and this later became famous as an instance of unity among the Orthodox leadership. Agudath Israel's mouthpiece, the Jewish Observer, also mentioned Soloveitchik as one of the greatest rabbis of the generation when detailing a cable which was sent by various leading Rabbis to former Israeli Prime Minister Levi Eshkol requesting the government to put a stop to Christian missionary activity in Israel. In May 1993, Nisson Wolpin penned an obituary for Soloveitchik in the Jewish Observer. The article was criticized for being a mere page long as instead of the Jewish Observer's usually comparatively long obituaries, for the obituary not being mentioned in the table of contents, and portraying Soloveitchik as not clarifying his views enough. Moshe David Tendler, a son-in-law of Moshe Feinstein, wrote a scathing attack on Wolpin's piece, which was published both in The Community Synagogue of Monsey's newsletter and the Algemeiner Journal.

Soloveitchik did not sign Feinstein's proposed ban on interfaith dialogue. Instead, he published a path-breaking essay expounding his views on the subject, entitled "Confrontation." He also did not sign the ban by America's foremost rabbis against participating in the Synagogue Council of America. It has been debated whether his refusal to sign was because he believed in participating in the SCA, or because he was not happy with the way the ban was instituted.

Despite the Agudah's comparative silence on Soloveitchik and his stances, the Jewish Observer has often criticized the Rabbinical Council of America in which he served and his more modern students, including Rabbi Norman Lamm, Shlomo Riskin and Lawrence Kaplan.

=== Relations with Rabbi Menachem Mendel Schneerson ===
Herschel Schacter, Sholem Kowalsky, Julius Berman; Menachem Genack, and Fabian Schoenfeld (all students of Soloveitchik) have asserted that Menachem Mendel Schneerson and Soloveitchik met for the first time while they both studied in Berlin. Soloveitchik told Kowalsky he "was a great admirer of the Rebbe." Schoenfeld quoted Soloveitchik as having told him that when he was studying at the University of Berlin, "I can testify that [Schneerson] never missed going to the mikva one single day." In 1964, Soloveitchik paid a lengthy visit while Schneerson was mourning the death of his mother. Their conversation during this visit lasted approximately two hours. Soloveitchik later visited again following the death of Schneerson's mother-in-law. In 1980, accompanied by his student Herschel Schacter, Soloveitchik visited Schneerson at Chabad headquarters in Brooklyn on the occasion of a celebration marking the 30th anniversary of his leadership. The visit lasted close to two hours after which Soloveitchik told Schacter his opinion of Schneerson: "He is a gaon (genius), he is a great one, he is a leader of Israel."

=== Debate over world view ===
Many of Soloveitchik's students became leaders in the Modern Orthodox community. These students tend to espouse very distinct world views.

One of the most iconoclastic is David Hartman of Jerusalem, whose support for pluralism has gained him serious backing in non-Orthodox streams and who has brought Soloveitchik's thinking to the non-Orthodox. The institution he founded, the Shalom Hartman Institute, is a home for serious thinkers from Orthodoxy, Conservative/Masorti, Reform and even secular scholars, and trains hundreds of Jewish community leaders annually. Avi Weiss and Saul Berman, who represent liberal Modern Orthodox institutions such as Yeshivat Chovevei Torah and Edah, are somewhat further to the right of Irving Greenberg, Riskin and Hartman, but still very liberal in comparison to most Orthodox thinkers (Weiss has classified this approach as "Open Orthodoxy").

Many students of Soloveitchik represent a centrist approach to Modern Orthodoxy (which Lamm has coined "Centrist Orthodoxy") such as Rabbis Aharon Lichtenstein, Benjamin Blech, Henry Hoschander, Lawrence Kaplan, and Norman Lamm. The Torah UMadda Journal, Tradition magazine, the Rabbinical Council of America, Efrat, Yeshiva University, Bnei Akiva, the Orthodox Union, and various post-high school yeshivot and seminaries in Israel (i.e. Yeshivat HaKotel and Yeshivat Har Etzion) are largely, if not mostly (but almost never monolithically) populated by "Centrist Orthodox" Jews.

Further to the right in the spectrum of Orthodoxy lie Rabbis Yehuda Parnes and Abba Bronspiegel, both of whom resigned from teaching positions in Yeshiva University to join right-wing alternative Lander College. A few of Soloveitchik students identify themselves and Soloveitchik's teachings with the Haredi world, such as Moshe Meiselman, Soloveitchik's nephew and Rosh Yeshiva of Yeshiva Toras Moshe in Jerusalem; Mosheh Twersky, one of Soloveitchik's grandchildren and a teacher at Toras Moshe; Michel Shurkin, also a teacher at Toras Moshe. And Rabbi Chaim Ilson who had a Yeshiva called Yeshivas Derech Hatalmud.

==== Integration with secular society ====
Since his death, interpretations of Soloveitchik's beliefs have become a matter of ongoing debate, somewhat analogous to the long-standing debate about Samson Raphael Hirsch. Some Haredim and some on the right wing of Modern Orthodoxy believe that Hirsch only wanted Jews to combine an observant Jewish lifestyle with learning the surrounding gentile society's language, history, and science, so that a religious Jew could operate in the surrounding secular society. However, this is not a universally held opinion among right-wing Orthodox Jews (see, for example, the writings of Shimon Schwab and the biography of Hirsch by Eliyahu Klugman). Similarly, some scholars of Soloveitchik's philosophy maintain that an eclectic pragmatic approach was adopted by Soloveitchik as well. According to this view, Soloveitchik did not approve of Jews learning secular philosophy, music, art, literature or ethics, unless it was for purposes of obtaining a livelihood or outreach.

In contrast, liberal leaning scholars believe that this understanding of Soloveitchik's philosophy is misguided. This issue has been discussed in many articles in Tradition: A Journal of Orthodox Thought, published by the Rabbinical Council of America. According to this view, Soloveitchik believed that it was permissible for Jews to learn secular philosophy, music, art, literature and ethics for their own sake and encouraged this.

Professor Yitzhak Twersky, a son-in-law of The Rav, pointed out in a eulogy published in the journal Tradition in 1996 that Soloveitchik's philosophy could be paraphrased as follows: "When you know your [Jewish] Way—your point of departure and goals—then use philosophy, science and the humanities to illumine your exposition, sharpen your categories, probe the profundities and subtleties of the masorah and reveal its charm and majesty; in so doing you should be able to command respect from the alienated and communicate with some who might otherwise be hostile or indifferent to your teaching as well as to increase the sensitivity and spirituality of the committed."

==== Own criticism of his students ====
Soloveitchik stated that although he felt that he successfully transmitted the facts and laws of Judaism to his students, he felt that he failed in transmitting the experience of living an authentic Jewish life. He stated that many of his students "act like children, and experience religion like children. This is why they accept all types of fanaticism and superstition. Sometimes, they are even ready to do things that border on the immoral. They lack the experiential component of religion, and simply substitute obscurantism for it ... After all, I come from the ghetto. Yet, I have never seen so much naïve and uncritical commitment to people and to ideas as I see in America ... All extremism, fanaticism, and obscurantism come from a lack of security. A person who is secure cannot be an extremist." (A Reader's Companion to Ish Ha-Halakhah: Introductory Section, David Shatz, Yeshiva University, Joseph B. Soloveitchik Institute).

==== Revisionism ====
Shortly after Soloveitchik's passing, Lamm, in a eulogy for Soloveitchik delivered on April 25, 1993, urged his audience to "guard ... against any revisionism, any attempts to misinterpret the Rav's work in both worlds [the world of Torah and the world of Madda(Science)]. The Rav was not a lamdan who happened to have and use a smattering of general culture, and he was certainly not a philosopher who happened to be a talmid hakham, a Torah scholar ... We must accept him on his terms, as a highly complicated, profound, and broad-minded personality ... Certain burgeoning revisionisms may well attempt to disguise and distort the Rav's uniqueness by trivializing one or the other aspect of his rich personality and work, but they must be confronted at once." (Lawrence Kaplan Revisionism and the Rav: The Struggle for the Soul of Modern Orthodoxy, Judaism, Summer, 1999).

=== Relations with non-Orthodox Judaism ===
Soloveitchik was a life-long critic of all forms of non-Orthodox Judaism, including Reform Judaism and Conservative Judaism. He believed that these denominations were in significant error where they differed from Orthodox Judaism. He compared religious dialogue with Reform and Conservative leaders to dialogue between Pharisees and Karaites, considering it ridiculous. One of the major differences was in regard to the mixed seating in the synagogue. Consistent with the traditional rabbinic understanding of this issue, Soloveitchik ruled that it was forbidden to pray in a synagogue without a separation between the sexes (mi–d'orayta, a Pentateuchal prohibition), and without the use of a mechitza, a divider between the men's and women's sections (mi-derabbenan, a rabbinical prohibition). The effect of this was to prohibit prayer in any Reform synagogue and in many Conservative synagogues. His responsum on this question was also directed at the small number of Orthodox synagogues that were adopting mixed-sex seating. He was vociferous on this issue. Soloveitchik believed that Reform and Conservative rabbis did not have proper training in halakha and Jewish theology, and that due to their decisions and actions, they could not be considered rabbis, as Orthodox Jews traditionally understood the term. However, in practice, he sometimes granted non-Orthodox rabbis some degree of validity with respect to communal affairs (see examples below).

Soloveitchik developed the idea that Jews have historically been linked together by two distinct covenants. One is the brit yi'ud, "covenant of destiny," which is the covenant by which Jews are bound together through their adherence to halakha. The second is the brit goral, "covenant of fate," the desire and willingness to be part of a people chosen by God to live a sacred mission in the world, and the fact that all those who live in this covenant share the same fate of persecution and oppression, even if they do not live by halakha. Soloveitchik held that non-Orthodox Jews were in violation of the covenant of destiny, yet they are still bound together with Orthodox Jews in the covenant of fate.

In 1954 Soloveitchik issued a responsum on working with non-Orthodox Jews, Orthodox, Conservative and Reform Jews in the United States: Second article in a series on Responsa of Orthodox Judaism in the United States. The responsum recognized the leadership of non-Orthodox Jews in Jewish communal institutions (but not their rabbis in the Orthodox sense of the term), and concluded that participation with non-Orthodox Jews for political or welfare purposes is not only permissible, but obligatory.

The Council of Torah Sages of Agudath Yisroel countered with a ruling that such cooperation with non-Orthodox Jews was equivalent to endorsement of non-Orthodox Judaism, and thus was forbidden. In 1956 many Yeshiva leaders, including two rabbis from his own Yeshiva University, signed and issued a proclamation forbidding any rabbinical alumni of their yeshivot from joining with Reform or Conservative rabbis in professional organizations.

Soloveitchik declined to sign the proclamation, maintaining that there were areas, particularly those relating to problems that threatened all of Judaism, that required co-operation regardless of affiliation. His refusal emboldened other Modern Orthodox rabbis, and the Rabbinical Council of America and Union of Orthodox Congregations then joined the Synagogue Council of America, a group in which Orthodox, Reform and Conservative denominations worked together on common issues. (The Synagogue Council of America ceased operating in 1994.)

In the 1950s Soloveitchik and Saul Lieberman, in parallel with other members of the Rabbinical Council of America and Conservative Judaism's Rabbinical Assembly, engaged in a series of private negotiations; their objective was to found a joint Orthodox-Conservative beth din that would be a national rabbinic court for all Jews in America; it would supervise communal standards of marriage and divorce. It was to be modeled after the Israeli Chief Rabbinate, with only Orthodox judges, but with the expectation that it would be accepted by the larger Conservative movement as legitimate. Conservative rabbis in the Rabbinical Assembly formed a Joint Conference on Jewish Law and devoted a year to the effort.

For a number of reasons, the project did not succeed. According to Orthodox Rabbi Bernstein, the major reason for its failure was that the Orthodox rabbis insisted that the Conservative Rabbinical Assembly expel some Conservative rabbis for actions they took before the new Beit Din was formed, and the RA refused to do so (Bernstein, 1977). According to Orthodox Rabbi Emanuel Rackman, former president of the RCA, the major reason for its failure was pressure from right-wing Orthodox rabbis, who held that any cooperation between Orthodoxy and Conservatism was forbidden. In an account prepared in 1956, Rabbi Harry Halpern of the Rabbinical Assembly's Joint Conference wrote that negotiations between the Orthodox and Conservative were completed and agreed upon, but then a new requirement was demanded by the RCA: that the RA "impose severe sanctions" upon Conservative rabbis for actions they took before the new beth din was formed. The RA "could not assent to rigorously disciplining our members at the behest of an outside group." Per Halpern, subsequent efforts were made to cooperate with the Orthodox, but a letter from eleven Rosh Yeshivas was circulated declaring that Orthodox rabbis were forbidden to cooperate with Conservative rabbis (Proceedings of the CJLS of the Conservative Movement 1927–1970 Vol. II, pp. 850–852).

Until the 1950s, Jews of all denominations were generally allowed to use the same communal mikvaot (ritual baths) for the purposes of converting to Judaism, observing the rules of niddah in regard to laws of marital purity, ritually cleansing dishes, etc. However the Haredi movement increasingly denied the use of mikvaot to non-Orthodox rabbis for use in conversions. According to Walter Wurzburger, Soloveitchik counselled Orthodox rabbis against this practice, insisting that non-Orthodox have the option to use mikvaot (Wurzburger, 1994).

=== Zionism ===
Soloveitchik was the pre-eminent leader of politically conscious pro-Zionist modern Orthodox Judaism. Out of respect for his stature, many leaders and politicians from Israel sought his advice and blessings in state affairs. Reputedly, he was offered the position of Chief Rabbi of Israel by Prime Minister Ben Gurion but quietly declined. Despite his open and ardent support for the modern State of Israel, he only visited Israel once, in 1935, before the modern state was established. Yosef Blau has written that Soloveitchik's non-messianic Zionism was philosophically similar to that of Yitzchak Yaacov Reines (see Tradition 33.2, Communications).

On Yom ha-Atzma'ut (Israel's Independence Day), 1956, Soloveitchik delivered a public address at Yeshiva University entitled, "Kol Dodi Dofek; The Voice of My Beloved Knocks." The address, which has become a classic of religious Zionist philosophy, enumerates and elaborates upon the instances of God's tangible presence in the recent history of the Jewish people and the State of Israel. It also issues a clarion call to American Orthodoxy to embrace the State of Israel, and to commit itself and its resources to its development.

=== Affiliated organizations ===
In his early career in America, Soloveitchik joined with the traditional movements such as Agudath Israel of America and the Agudat Harabanim – the Union of Orthodox Rabbis of North America. In fact, Soloveitchik was on the first Moetzes Chachmei HaTorah of America. However, he later removed himself from the former organizations, and instead joined with the Mizrachi Religious Zionists of America (RZA) and became Chairman of the centrist Orthodox Rabbinical Council of America's (RCA) Halakhah Commission (the other two members are the time were Rabbis Chaim Heller and Samuel Belkin).

== Family and last years ==
During the 1950s and 1960s, until his wife's death in 1967, Soloveitchik and some of his students would spend summers near Cape Cod in Onset, Massachusetts, where they would pray at Congregation Beth Israel.

After the passing of his wife in 1967, Soloveitchik began giving additional lectures, open to the public, during the summer months in Boston.

Soloveitchik's daughters married prominent academics and Talmudic scholars: his daughter Tovah married Aharon Lichtenstein, former Rosh Yeshiva at RIETS who made Aliyah to become Rosh yeshiva of Yeshivat Har Etzion in Israel; his daughter Atarah (died February 24, 2023) married Isadore Twersky, former head of the Jewish Studies department at Harvard University (who also served as the Talner Rebbe in Boston). His son Haym Soloveitchik is a University Professor of Jewish History at Yeshiva University. His siblings included Samuel Soloveichik (1909–1967), Ahron Soloveichik (1917–2001), Shulamith Meiselman (1912–2009), and Anne Gerber (1915–2011). His grandchildren have maintained his heritage and also hold distinguished scholarly positions, such as Mosheh Lichtenstein, Yitzchok Lichtenstein, Esti Rosenberg and Mayer Twersky.

As he got older he suffered several bouts of serious illness (Alzheimer's disease preceded by Parkinson's disease).

== Family tree ==
Brisker family tree

Rabbanit Esti Rosenberg, director of Migdal Oz (seminary)
Rabbi Yitzchok Lichtenstein, Co-Rosh Yeshiva of Yeshiva Torah Vodaas; Rabbi Bais Avrohom, Monsey, NY
Rabbi Yosef Dov (Reb Berel) Soloveichik	Rabbi Avrohom Yehoshua Soloveichik	Rabbi Mosheh Lichtenstein, Co-Rosh Yeshiva of Yeshivat Har Etzion
Rabbi Meshulam Dovid (Reb Dovid) Soloveichik	Rabbi Yitzchak Zev Soloveichik	Rabbi Mayer Lichtenstein, Rabbi Ohel Menachem Bet Shemesh
Rabbi Yosef Dov (HaLevi) Soloveichik author of Beis HaLevi	Rabbi Chaim Soloveichik "Reb Chaim Brisker"	Rabbi Yitzchak Zev (Reb Velvel) Soloveichik "The GRIZ"; The Brisker Rov	Lifsha Soloveitchik Feinstein	Dr. Tovah Soloveitchik Lichtenstein	Rabbi Jonathan Rosenblatt
Rabbi Refael Shapiro, Rosh Yeshiva of Volozhin yeshiva	Lifsha Shapiro	Rabbi Refoel Soloveichik	Rabbi Dr. Aharon Lichtenstein	Tzipporah Rosenblatt
Rabbi Meir Soloveichik	Dr. Atarah Soloveitchik Twersky	Rabbi Mosheh Twersky z"l, Maggid Shiur at Yeshiva Toras Moshe
Rabbi Dr. Joseph B. (Yosef Dov) Soloveitchik "The Rav"	Rabbi Dr. Isadore Twersky, Talner Rebbe of Boston	Rabbi Mayer Twersky, Rosh Yeshiva at Rabbi Isaac Elchanan Theological Seminary
Rabbi Moshe Soloveichik	Rabbi Ahron Soloveichik	Rabbi Dr. Haym Soloveitchik	Rabbi Moshe Soloveichik, Rosh Yeshivas Brisk (Chicago); Rav of Kehilas Beth Sholom Ahavas Achim
Pesia Feinstein Soloveichik	Dr. Samuel Soloveichik	Rabbi Eliyahu Soloveichik, Rosh Yeshiva at Lander College's Beis Medrash L'Talmud	Rabbi Meir Yaakov Soloveichik
Shulamit Soloveitchik Meiselman	Rabbi Moshe Meiselman, Rosh Yeshiva of Yeshiva Toras Moshe	Rabbi Yosef Soloveichik	Sarah Orenshein
Anne Soloveitchik Gerber	Rabbi Chayim Soloveichik, Maggid Shiur at Yeshivat Reishit; Morah D’Asrah of Kehillat Ohr Shalom, Ramat Beit Shemesh	Moshe Soloveichik
Rabbi Yosef Dov Soloveichik	Rabbi Shmuel Chaim Soloveichik
Rabbi Yitzchok Soloveichik	Rabbi Yisroel Soloveichik
Rabbi Yisroel Gershon Soloveichik	Rabbi Moshe Soloveichik	Rabbi Boruch Soloveichik
Rabbi Avraham Yeshaya Soloveichik
Daughter Soloveichik

Notes:
- Rabbi Chaim Halevi Soloveichik (the second)

== Works ==
=== Works by Joseph Soloveitchik ===
- Das reine Denken und die Seinskonstituierung bei Hermann Cohen (1932 dissertation)
- Halakhic Morality: Essays on Ethics and Mesorah Edited by Joel B. Wolowelsky and Reuven Ziegler. Maggid Books, 2016.
- Confrontation and Other Essays Edited by Reuven Ziegler, Maggid Books, 2016.
- Three letters by Soloveitchik on seating in the synagogue are contained with The Sanctity of the Synagogue, Ed. Baruch Litvin. The Spero Foundation, NY, 1959. An expanded third edition of this book is Edited by Jeanne Litvin. Ktav, Hoboken, NJ, 1987.
- Confrontation, Tradition 6:2 p5-9, 1964. Reprinted in "A Treasury of Tradition," Hebrew Publishing Co, NY, 1967.
- The Lonely Man of Faith, Tradition, vol. 7#2, p56, 1965. This essay was published as a book by Doubleday in 1992, reprinted by Jason Aronson in 1997, and reprinted in a revised edition by Koren Publishers Jerusalem in 2011.
- Sacred and Profane, Kodesh and Chol in World Perspective, Gesher, Vol. 3#1, p5-29, 1966. This article has been reprinted with expdanded notes in Jewish Thought, Volume 3 No. 1, p55-82, 1993
- The Community, p7-24;Majesty and Humility, p25-37; Catharsis, p. 38–54; Redemption, Prayer and Talmud Torah, p55-73; A Tribute to the Rebbetzin of Talne, p. 73–83 are all printed in Tradition 17:2, Spring, 1978.
- Several of Soloveitchik's responsa for the RCA Halakha commission are contained in Challenge and mission: the emergence of the English speaking Orthodox rabbinate, L. Bernstein, Shengold, NY, 1982.
- Halakhic Man Translated by L. Kaplan, Jewish Publication Society of America, Philadelphia PA,1983
- The Halakhic Mind Seth Press, New York NY, 1986
- Fate and Destiny: From Holocaust to the State of Israel Ktav Publishing, Hoboken NJ 1992 and 2000.
- The Voice of My Beloved Knocketh translation by Lawrence Kaplan in Theological and Halakhic Responses on the Holocaust, Eds. Bernhard H. Rosenberg and Fred Heuman. Ktav/RCA, Hoboken, NJ, 1993
- Family Redeemed: Essays on Family Relationships, Edited by David Shatz and Joel B. Wolowelsky. Ktav, Hoboken, NJ, 2004.
- Out of the Whirlwind: Essays on Mourning, Suffering and the Human Condition, Edited by David Shatz, Joel B. Wolowelsky and Reuven Ziegler. Ktav, Hoboken, NJ, 2004.
- Worship of the Heart: Essays on Jewish Prayer, Edited by Shalom Carmy, Ktav, Hoboken, NJ, 2004.
- Emergence of Ethical Man, Edited by Michael Berger, Ktav, Hoboken, NJ, 2005.
- Community, Covenant and Commitment – Selected Letters and Communications, Edited by Nathaniel Helfgot, Ktav, Hoboken, NJ 2005.
- Festival of Freedom: Essays on Pesah and the Haggadah, Edited by Joel B. Wolowelsky and Reuven Ziegler. Ktav, Hoboken, NJ 2006.
- Kol Dodi Dofek, Translated by David Z. Gordon. Edited by Jeffrey Woolf, New York: Yeshiva University and Hoboken, NJ: Ktav 2006.
- The Lord is Righteous in All His Ways: Reflections on the Tish'ah Be'Av Kinot, Edited by Jacob J. Schachter, Ktav, Hoboken, NJ 2006.
- Days of Deliverance: Essays on Purim and Hanukkah, Edited by Eli D. Clark, Joel B. Wolowelsky, and Reuven Ziegler. Ktav, Hoboken, NJ 2006.
- Abraham's Journey: Reflections on the Life of the Founding Patriarch, Edited by David Shatz, Joel B. Wolowelsky and Reuven Ziegler. Ktav, Hoboken, NJ 2007.
- Vision and Leadership: Reflections on Joseph and Moses, Edited by David Shatz, Joel B. Wolowelsky and Reuven Ziegler. Ktav, Hoboken, NJ 2012.
- And From There You Shall Seek (U-Vikkashtem mi-Sham), Translated by Naomi Goldblum. Ktav, Hoboken, NJ 2008.
- On Repentance (Hebrew "Al haTeshuva," Jerusalem 1979); the major points of Rabbi Soloveitchik's teachings on teshuvah (repentance), based on his annual series of lectures on this theme, as redacted by Prof. Pinchas Peli.

=== Scholarship and Halakha ===
- Shiurim Le-zekher Abba Mari z"l, 2 vols., Jerusalem: Machon Yerushalayim, 1983 and 1985. Reprinted in a two volume set in 2002 by Mossad HaRav Kook, Jerusalem
- Kovetz Chiddushei Torah קובץ חידושי תורה (in Hebrew). Jerusalem: Machon Yerushalayim. 1984.
- Kunteres Be-inyan Avodat Yom Ha-kippurim (in Hebrew). Jerusalem. 1986.
- Chiddushei Ha-gram Ve-hagrid al Inyanei Kodshim, NY: Morasha Foundation, 1993.
- Igros Hagrid Halavi, Jerusalem: Morasha Foundation, 2001. Chiddushim he sent to his father in the 1920s and 1930s.
- Lichtenstein, Yitzchok, ed. (1995). הגדה של פסח שיח הגרי"ד (in Hebrew). Jerusalem.
- Harirei Kedem, Vol. I and II on Yom Tov and Vol III on Shabbat by Rabbi Michel Shurkin.
- A series of 3 volues entiled Shiurei Hagri"d were edited by Rabbi Yair Kahn and published by Mossad HaRav Kook:
  - Kahn, Yair, ed. (2004). Shiurei Hagrid – Stam, Tefilin, Tzitzis שיעורי הגרי"ד על ענייני תפילין, סת"ם, ציצית (in Hebrew). Jerusalem: Mossad HaRav Kook.
  - Kahn, Yair, ed. (2005). Shiurei HaGrid Avodas Yom HaKippurim שיעורי הגרי"ד סולוביצ'יק – עבודת יום הכיפורים (in Hebrew). Jerusalem: Mossad HaRav Kook.
  - Kahn, Yair, ed. (2013). Shiurei Hagrid – Kerisos שיעורי הגרי"ד סולוביצ'יק – כריתותם (in Hebrew). Jerusalem: Mossad HaRav Kook.
- Rabbi Hershel Schachter's note of Rabbi Soloveitchik's Shiurim were published in six volumes by TorahWeb:
  - Schachter, Hershel, ed. (2002). Shiurei HaRav HaGaon Rabi Yosef Dov HaLevi Soloveitchik zt'l Al Inyanei Tzitzit, Inyanei Tefillin VeHilkhot Kriat HaTorah – MiPi HaShmuah שיעורי הרב הגאון רבי יוסף דב הלוי סולוביצ'יק זצ"ל על עניני ציצית, עניני תפילין והלכות קריאת התורה – מפי השמועה (PDF) (in Hebrew). New Jersey.
  - Schachter, Hershel, ed. (2002). Shiurei HaRav HaGaon Rabi Yosef Dov HaLevi Soloveitchik zt'l Al Pesahim, Rosh HaShanah, Yom HaKippurim U'Megilah – MiPi HaShmuah שיעורי הרב הגאון רבי יוסף דב הלוי סולוביצ'יק זצ"ל על פסחים, ר"ה, יוהכ"פ ומגילה – מפי השמועה (PDF) (in Hebrew). New Jersey.
  - Schachter, Hershel, ed. (2003). Shiurei HaRav HaGaon Rabi Yosef Dov HaLevi Soloveitchik zt'l LeMasekhet Gittin – MiPi HaShmuah שיעורי הרב הגאון רבי יוסף דב הלוי סולוביצ'יק זצ"ל למס' גיטין – מפי השמועה (in Hebrew). New Jersey. ISBN 979-8788105925.
  - Schachter, Hershel, ed. (2004). Shiurei HaRav HaGaon Rabi Yosef Dov HaLevi Soloveitchik zt'l LeMasekhet Kiddushin – MiPi HaShmuah שיעורי הרב הגאון רבי יוסף דב הלוי סולוביצ'יק זצ"ל למס' קידושין – מפי השמועה (in Hebrew). New Jersey.
  - Schachter, Hershel, ed. (2004). Shiurei HaRav HaGaon Rabi Yosef Dov HaLevi Soloveitchik zt'l Al Masekhet Shabbat – MiPi HaShmuah שיעורי הרב הגאון רבי יוסף דב הלוי סולוביצ'יק זצ"ל על מס' שבת – מפי השמועה (in Hebrew). New Jersey.
  - Schachter, Hershel, ed. (2013). Shiurei HaRav HaGaon Rabi Yosef Dov HaLevi Soloveitchik zt'l Al Hilkhot Niddah – MiPi HaShmuah שיעורי הרב הגאון רבי יוסף דב הלוי סולוביצ'יק זצ"ל על הל' נדה – מפי השמועה (PDF) (in Hebrew). New Jersey.
- His teachings were published by OU Press in a multi-volume series titled Shiurei Harav which were edited by Rabbi Menachem Genack and Rabbi Hershel Schachter:
  - Schiowitz, Chaim. Shiurei Harav – Challah & Mitzvos Hatluyos Ba'Aretz שיעורי הרב על מסכת חלה ומצוות התלויות בארץ (in Hebrew). OU Press.
  - Koenigsberg, Eliakim. Shiurei Harav – Yoreh Deah שיעורי הרב על יו"ד (in Hebrew). OU Press.
  - Koenigsberg, Eliakim. Shiurei Harav – Tisha B'Av & Aveilut שיעורי הרב על הלכות אבלות והלכות ט' באב (in Hebrew). OU Press.
  - Gordon, Noam. Shiurei Harav – Gittin (2 volumes) שיעורי הרב על מסכתב גיטין (in Hebrew). OU Press.
  - Sasson, Yaacov. Shiurei Harav – Sanhedrin שיעורי הרב על מסכת סנהדרין (in Hebrew). OU Press.
  - Genack, Menachem. Shiurei Harav – Tefillah & Keriat Shema שיעורי הרב על ענייני תפילה וק"ש (in Hebrew). OU Press.
- Rabbi Hershel Reichman published 11 volumes of Rabbi Soloveitchiks lectures in a series titled Reshimos Shiurim.
  - Reichman, Hershel, ed. (1989). Reshimos Shiurim: Sukkah רשימות שיעורים – סוכה (in Hebrew). New York.
  - Reichman, Hershel, ed. (1993). Reshimos Shiurim: Shevuot, Nedarim רשימות שיעורים – שבועות, נדרים (in Hebrew). New York.
  - Reichman, Hershel, ed. (1999). Reshimos Shiurim: Bava Kama רשימות שיעורים – בבא קמא (in Hebrew). New York.
  - Reichman, Hershel, ed. (2012). Reshimos Shiurim: Brachos רשימות שיעורים – ברכות (in Hebrew). New York.
  - Reichman, Hershel, ed. (2022). Reshimos Shiurim: Kiddushin רשימות שיעורים – קידושין (in Hebrew). New York.
  - Reichman, Hershel, ed. (2024). Reshimos Shiurim: Sanhedrin רשימות שיעורים – סנהדרין (in Hebrew). New York.
  - Reichman, Hershel, ed. (2025). Reshimos Shiurim: Channukah and Purim רשימות שיעורים – חנוכה ופורים (in Hebrew). New York.
  - Reichman, Hershel, ed. (2025). Reshimos Shiurim: Tishrei רשימות שיעורים – ירח האיתנים (in Hebrew). New York.
  - Reichman, Hershel, ed. (2025). Reshimos Shiurim: Three Weeks רשימות שיעורים – בין המצרים (in Hebrew). New York.
  - Reichman, Hershel, ed. (2025). Reshimos Shiurim: Pesach רשימות שיעורים – פסח (in Hebrew). New York.

=== Adaptations ===
- Shiurei Harav—A Conspectus of the Public Lectures of Rabbi Joseph B. Soloveitchik, Ed. Joseph Epstein. Hamevaser, Yeshiva University, 1974.
- The Koren Mesorat HaRav Kinot, Koren Publishers Jerusalem & the Orthodox Union, 2010.
- The Koren Mesorat HaRav Siddur, Koren Publishers Jerusalem & the Orthodox Union, 2011.

=== Legacy of his hashkafa (worldview) ===
- Rabbi Norman Lamm, A Eulogy for the Rav, Tradition 28.1 1993
- Rabbi Walter S. Wurzburger, Rav Joseph B. Soloveitchik as Posek of Post-Modern Orthodoxy, Tradition Volume 29, 1994
- Joseph Soloveitchik, article in the Encyclopaedia Judaica, Keter Publishing
- Seth Farber, Reproach, Recognition and Respect: Rabbi Joseph B. Soloveitchik and Orthodoxy's Mid-Century Attitude Toward Non-Orthodox Denominations American Jewish History, Vol. 89,#2 193–214, 2001.
- Zvi Kolitz Confrontation: The Existential Thought of Rabbi J.B. SoloveitchikKtav, Hoboken, NJ, 1992
- Simcha Krauss, The Rav on Zionism, Universalism and Feminism Tradition 34:2, 24–39, 2000
- Alan Todd Levenson, "Joseph B. Soloveitchik's 'The Halakhic Mind'; a liberal critique and appreciation," CCAR Journal 41,1 55–63, 1994
- Aharon Ziegler, Halakhic Positions of Rabbi Joseph B. Soloveitchik Jason Aronson Inc., 1998.
- Aharon Ziegler Halakhic Positions of Rabbi Joseph B. Soloveitchik, Vol II Jason Aronson Inc., 2001
- Aviezer Ravitsky, Rabbi J.B. Soloveitchik on Human Knowledge: Between Maimonidean and Neo-Kantian Philosophy, Modern Judaism 6:2 157–188, 1986.
- David Hartman, Love and Terror in the God Encounter: The Theological Legacy of Rabbi Joseph B. Soloveitchik Jewish Lights Publishing, 2001
- Ephraim Chamiel, Between religion and Reason – The Dialectical Position in Contemporary Jewish Thought, Academic Studies Press, Boston 2020, part I, pp. 16–55.
- Jeffrey R. Woolf, 'In Search of the Rav', BaDaD, 18 (2007) 5–28.
- Jeffrey R. Woolf, "Time Awareness as a Source of Spirituality in the Thought of Rabbi Joseph B. Soloveitchik," Modern Judaism, 32,1 (2012), 54–75.

=== Cooperation with non-Orthodox Jews ===
- Rabbi Norman Lamm, Seventy Faces, Moment Vol. II, No. 6 June 1986-Sivan 5746
- Rabbi Mayer E. Rabinowitz Comments to the Agunot Conference in Jerusalem, July 1998, and on the Learn@JTS website.
- Rabbi Louis Bernstein The Emergence of the English Speaking Orthodox Rabbinate, 1977, Yeshiva University
- Rabbi Emmanuel Rackman, letter in The Jewish Week May 8, 1997, page 28.
- Joseph Soloveitchik Orthodox, Conservative and Reform Jews in the United States: Second article in a series on Responsa of Orthodox Judaism in the United States, 1954
- Jack Wertheimer, Ed., Tradition Renewed: A History of the Jewish Theological Seminary of America, Vol. II, p. 450, 474, JTS, NY, 1997
- Proceedings of the Committee on Jewish Law and Standards of the Conservative Movement 1927–1970, Vol. II, Ed. David Golinkin, The Rabbinical Assembly, 1997

== Awards ==
- 1985: National Jewish Book Award in the Jewish Thought category for Halakhic Man
- 2010: National Jewish Book Award in the Modern Jewish Thought and Experiment for The Koren Mesorat HaRav Kinot

== Bibliography ==
- Majesty and Humility: The Thought of Rabbi Joseph B. Soloveitchik by Reuven Ziegler, 2012, Maimonides/OU/Urim.
- Rabbi in the New World, the Influence of Rabbi J. B. Soloveitzik on Culture, Education and Jewish Thought, Avinoam Rosenak and Naftali Rothenberg eds. Jerusalem 2010: Magnes Hebrew University Press
- The Last Rabbi: Joseph Soloveitchik and Talmudic Tradition by William Kolbrener, 2016, Indiana University Press
- Dor-Shav (Dershowitz), Zecharia (2022). "Personal Experiences with Great Rabbis of My Generation". Dershowitz Family Saga. ISBN 9781510770232.

== See also ==
- Jewish existentialism
- Maimonides School, the school founded by Soloveitchik in Brookline
- Yeshiva University
- Berel Soloveitchik
