= Congregation Beth Israel (Onset, Massachusetts) =

Orthodox synagogue in Massachusetts, US

- Hebrew: בית ישראל
- Location on Cape Cod

Religion
- Affiliation: Orthodox Judaism
- Ecclesiastical or organisational status: Synagogue
- Leadership: Eli and Wendy Hauser
- Status: Active

Location
- Location: 7 Locust Street, Buzzards Bay, Onset, Massachusetts 02532
- Country: United States
- Coordinates: 41°44′36″N 70°39′04″W

Architecture
- Completed: 1948
- Materials: Clapboard

Website
- capecodshul.org

Congregation Beth Israel (Hebrew: בית ישראל), sometimes called Cape Cod Shul and officially Congregation Beth Israel of Onset Cape Cod, is an Orthodox Jewish congregation and synagogue located at 7 Locust Street, Onset, on Cape Cod, Massachusetts, in the United States.

Historically, it is well known as the summer synagogue of Rabbi Joseph B. Soloveitchik and some of his students from the 1950s until the mid-1960s, when his wife died. The clapboard building was originally a furniture store, before it was converted to a synagogue in 1948.

Initially a destination for Jewish vacationers from Boston, Beth Israel now attracts Jews from Toronto, Montreal, and New York City from a "wide cross-section of Orthodoxy", including "Young Israel, Chabad, Chasidim from Montreal, Charedim, Carlebach Chasidim, very-left wing (Edah) and 'Conservadox'." The synagogue maintains three daily minyans throughout the summer and through the High Holidays.
