= Schacter =

Schacter is a surname. Notable people with the surname include:

- Daniel Schacter (born 1952), American psychologist
- Herschel Schacter (1917–2013), American Orthodox rabbi
- Jacob J. Schacter (born 1950), American Orthodox rabbi
- Jane S. Schacter (born 1958), American jurist

== See also ==
- Schechter
