= Moshe Meiselman =

American Orthodox rabbi

Rabbi Moshe Meiselman משה מיזלמן

Personal life
- Born: Moshe Meiselman; March 14, 1942 (age 84) Montgomery, Alabama, U.S.
- Spouse: Rivkah Leah Eichenstein
- Parents: Harry Meiselman (father); Shulamit Soloveitchik (mother)
- Education: Boston Latin; Harvard University; Massachusetts Institute of Technology

Religious life
- Religion: Judaism

Jewish leader
- Position: Rosh yeshiva
- Yeshiva: Yeshiva Toras Moshe
- Began: 1982
- Other: Founder and Dean of Academic Affairs, Yeshiva University of Los Angeles

Moshe Meiselman (Hebrew: משה מיזלמן) is an American-born Orthodox rabbi and rosh yeshiva (dean) of Yeshiva Toras Moshe in Jerusalem, which he established in 1982. He also founded and served as principal of Yeshiva University of Los Angeles (YULA) from 1977 to 1982. He is a descendant of the Lithuanian Jewish Soloveitchik rabbinic dynasty.

== Early life and education ==
Rabbi Meiselman was born to Harry Meiselman, a dental surgeon, and Shulamit Soloveitchik, a teacher and Jewish school principal who attended New York University and Radcliffe College. On his father's side, he is a descendent of the rebbe (hereditary leader of a hasidic dynasty) Baruch of Kossov. On his mother's side, he is a descendant of the Soloveitchik rabbinic dynasty. His maternal grandfather was Rabbi Moshe Soloveichik and his maternal great-grandfather was Rabbi Chaim Soloveitchik, known as Reb Chaim Brisker. His mother, Shulamit, authored the book The Soloveitchik Heritage: A Daughter's Memoir (1995). Rabbi Meiselman was a nephew of Rabbi Dr. Joseph B. Soloveitchik, rosh yeshiva of R.I.E.T.S., with whom, according to Rabbi Meiselman, he had study sessions on a near daily basis from the time he was 18 until he was 29 years old.

Rabbi Meiselman graduated from high school at the Boston Latin School and then went on to attend Harvard College (which all three of Soloveitchik's children and his American grandchildren attended) and the Massachusetts Institute of Technology where he earned his doctorate in mathematics in 1967 with the thesis "The Operation Ring for Connective K-Theory".

== Career ==
Rabbi Meiselman began his career teaching mathematics at City University of New York. After his marriage in 1971, he became a maggid shiur at Beis Medrash L'Torah in Skokie. Afterward, he taught at Yeshivas Brisk (Brisk Rabbinical College) in Chicago, headed for a time by his uncle, Rabbi Ahron Soloveichik. In 1977 he moved to the West Coast and founded the Yeshiva University of Los Angeles (YULA), opening separate high school programs for boys and girls, a yeshivah gedolah, and a kollel. He also served as a posek (arbiter of Jewish law) for the local community.

In 1982, having built up enrollment to nearly 400 male and female students in YULA's various divisions, Rabbi Meiselman moved to Israel to open a yeshiva for American students, together with co-rosh yeshiva Rabbi Doniel Lehrfield (Rabbi Lehrfield and several other faculty members subsequently left to start another yeshiva, Bais Yisroel). He named the new school Toras Moshe after his grandfather, Moshe. He selected Rabbis Michel Shurkin and Moshe Twersky, both close students of Rabbi Soloveitchik, to head the teaching staff. In 2011, Meiselman reported about his yeshiva that "We have 96 boys in the beis medrash and 44 in the kollel, and almost all of our kollel yungerleit are home-grown".

Rabbi Meiselman is one of several grandchildren of Rabbi Moshe Soloveichik who have established yeshivas in Israel, perhaps the most famous being Rabbi Aharon Lichtenstein, son-in-law of Rabbi Joseph Soloveitchik, who established Yeshivat Har Etzion in the late 1960s. Yeshivat Reshit, a popular yeshiva in Israel for American students in Beit Shemesh, was established by the Rabbis Marcus, also descendants of Rabbi Moshe Soloveitchik.

Rabbi Meiselman is the author of several books and numerous magazine articles. His Jewish Woman in Jewish Law (1978) sparked much discussion among authors and feminists for his traditional Jewish response to feminism. Additionally, Rabbi Meiselman has authored Tiferes Tzvi, a commentary to the Rambam, as well as numerous articles on Talmudic study and thought in Hebrew.

== Philosophies and controversies ==
=== Torah, Chazal and Science ===
Rabbi Meiselman's 2013 book, Torah, Chazal and Science, promotes the theory that all unqualified scientific statements of the Talmudic sages are sourced from the word of God, who can not be wrong, and are therefore immutable: "All of Chazal’s (the Talmudic sages') definitive statements are to be taken as absolute fact [even] outside the realm of halakhah (Jewish law)". The flip side of this thesis, and another major theme of the book, is that modern science is transitory and unreliable compared to the divine wisdom of the sages. His book has been criticized by Rabbi Dr. Natan Slifkin and others.

=== The Holocaust ===
Following the opinion of some Haredi thinkers in the area of Holocaust theology, Meiselman has argued that the Holocaust was the result of Jewish cultural assimilation in Western Europe in the early twentieth century. He writes that "the turning away from the status of an am ha-nivhar, a chosen people, and the frightening rush toward assimilation were, according to the rules that govern Jewish destiny, the real causes for the Holocaust."

=== The State of Israel ===
Rabbi Meiselman subscribes to Haredi views regarding the State of Israel and the Israel Defence Forces. He has stated that it is forbidden for a yeshiva student to join the Israeli army, and has criticized the Nachal Haredi, stating in an interview that Nachal Haredi has "not been successful in maintaining commitment to Torah."

In 2013, Rabbi Meiselman sat on the dais at a rally in NY against conscription of yeshiva students into the Israeli army. Both Satmar Rebbes were involved in the planning of, and also sat at the dais at, this rally.

=== Modern Orthodoxy ===
In commenting on Modern Orthodox innovations with regard to women, Rabbi Meiselman has stated that "when it comes to the rabbis and the people who are at the forefront of pushing for these changes so that they can 'update' Orthodoxy to conform with today’s 'progressive' cultural norm ... [the] common denominator between nearly all of them is that they are largely ignorant of halacha and devoid of serious Torah scholarship. If your knowledge of Torah and halacha are limited, then you are not limited by halacha. One is never confined by things that one doesn't know and never learned!"

Some of Yeshiva Toras Moshe's faculty members dissuade students from enrolling at Yeshiva University when they leave Toras Moshe, while others are less opposed.

== Personal ==
Meiselman is married to Rivkah Leah Eichenstein.

== Bibliography ==
=== Books ===
- Torah, Chazal and Science. Israel Bookshop Publications. 2013. ISBN 978-1-60091-243-6.
- Jewish Woman in Jewish Law. Ktav Publishing House. 1978. ISBN 0-87068-329-2.
- Meiselman, Moshe (1974). Esheth Hayil in Perspective: The Role of Women in Judaism.

=== Selected articles ===
- "Commitment: Reviewed by Moshe Meiselman" (PDF). Jewish Action. Orthodox Union: 89–94. 2005.
- "The Rav, Feminism and Public Policy: An Insider's Overview". Tradition. 33 (1): 5–30.
- The Incomparable Gaon of Vilna. Orthodox Union. 1997.
