= Dov Linzer =

New York rabbi

- דב נתן לינזר
- Born: David Barry Linzer; September 16, 1966 (age 59); Silver Spring, Maryland
- Education: Yeshivat Har Etzion, Yeshiva University, University of Maryland
- Occupations: Rabbi, teacher, podcaster
- Spouse: Devorah Zlochower
- Children: Kasriel, Netanel
- Website: rabbidovlinzer.blogspot.com, www.the-daf.com, weeklyparsha.wordpress.com

Dov Linzer (Hebrew: דב נתן לינזר; born September 16, 1966) is the President and Rabbinic Head (Rosh HaYeshiva) of the Modern Orthodox Yeshivat Chovevei Torah Rabbinical School in Riverdale, New York. He is a teacher, lecturer, podcaster, and author.

He has a BA in philosophy from the University of Maryland, rabbinic ordination (semikhah from the Israeli Rabbinate. He is an alumnus of Yeshivat Har Etzion and Yeshiva University's Gruss Kollel Elyon. Linzer has been a scholar-in-residence in synagogues across the United States, and has published in numerous Talmudic journals and Jewish newspapers. Previously, he headed the Boca Raton Kollel, one of the first Modern Orthodox kollels, for the first two-and-a-half years of its existence.

In 2011 Newsweek ranked him among the 50 most prominent rabbis in the United States, stating that "Linzer's students now hold some of the most prominent positions in shuls and Hillels all over the country" and that his school's "alumni will undoubtedly alter the fabric of Modern Orthodoxy".

In 2008 Linzer received the Avi Chai Fellowship, awarded to emerging communal and educational leaders.

== Yeshivat Chovevei Torah ==
Linzer has been the Rabbinic Head of Yeshivat Chovevei Torah since its founding in 1999. He was named its dean, assuming ultimate responsibility of both the religious studies and the professional training, in October, 2007. He is widely recognized as a major scholar of Talmud and Halakha, and is the primary architect of the school's innovative curriculum. In 2018 Rabbi Linzer was appointed as President of the yeshiva while continuing to serve as its Rabbinic Head. Linzer also teaches Halakha and Jewish Thought to the school's rabbinical students. In 2025, Rabbi Linzer announced that he would be stepping back from Presidential responsibilities in order to focus exclusively on being Rosh Yeshiva.

In 2008, Linzer's Yeshivat Chovevei Torah, together with JOFA and the Drisha Institute sponsored a conference entitled "Demystifying Sex and Teaching Halacha: A Kallah (Jewish Bridal) Teacher's Workshop," to address issues of sex and sexuality into classes given to Orthodox brides prior to their wedding.

== Opinions ==
Linzer has taken a public stand on a number of crucial and at times controversial issues within the Orthodox Jewish community. In 2006, he was the only Orthodox rabbi to go on record supporting the naming of Dina Najman as spiritual leader of the Orthodox congregation, Kehilat Orach Eliezer.

Linzer, together with his wife, Devorah Zlochower, has been outspoken about the Orthodox community's responsibility to address children of special needs in its schools, synagogues and communal institutions. At Linzer's Chovevei Torah, rabbinical students receive special training in inclusion for people with physical, developmental and learning disabilities.

In 2010, a paper commissioned by the Rabbinical Council of America voiced serious reservations as to the validity of brain-stem death as the Jewish legal definition of death. The rejection of this definition would make almost all organ-transplants forbidden by Jewish Law. Linzer authored a "Rabbinic Statement Regarding Organ Donation and Brain Death", reaffirming the legitimacy of the brain-death definition and critiquing those who would be prepared to receive organs but refuse to donate them. This statement was signed by over 100 rabbis, including some of the most prominent Modern Orthodox rabbis in the U.S. and Israel. The RCA subsequently backed away from the implications of its paper. The Agudath Israel of America then issued a statement which affirmed the halakhic validity of the original 2010 paper commissioned by the RCA as reflecting the position of "a majority of major poskim today". This, in turn, prompted the journal Tradition to publish a philosophical analysis of the merits of both Rabbi Linzer's and the Agudath Israel of America's respective statements.

== Organizations ==
- Yeshivat Chovevei Torah (headed by Linzer)

== Works ==
- Linzer, Dov (2010). "Tza'ar Ba'alei Chaim (Animal Suffering): A Case Study in Halakha and Values". In Levy, Yamin (ed.). Mishpetei Shalom: A Jubilee Volume in Honor of Rabbi Saul (Shalom) Berman. Hoboken, NJ: KTAV Publishing House. ISBN 978-1-60280-147-9.
- Linzer, Dov; Pogrebin, Abigail (2024). It Takes Two To Torah: An Orthodox Rabbi and Reform Journalist Discuss and Debate Their Way Through the Five Books of Moses. Bedford, NY: Fig Tree Books. ISBN 978-1-941493-34-2.
