= The Lonely Man of Faith =

Book by Joseph B. Soloveitchik

- First edition (1992)
- Author: Joseph B. Soloveitchik
- Publisher: Doubleday (1992)
- ISBN: 978-1-61329-003-3
- Website: korenpub.com/products/the-lonely-man-of-faithhardcover

The Lonely Man of Faith is a philosophical essay written by Rabbi Joseph B. Soloveitchik, first published in the summer 1965 issue of Tradition, and later as a book by Doubleday in 1992.

In The Lonely Man of Faith Soloveitchik reads the first two chapters of Book of Genesis as offering two images of Adam which are, in many ways, at odds with one another. The first Adam, or "majestic man," employs his creative faculties in order to master his environment as mandated by God; the second image of Adam is a distinctly different contractual man who surrenders himself to the will of God. Soloveitchik describes how the man of faith must integrate both of these ideas as he seeks to follow God's will.

In the first chapter, Adam I is created together with Eve and they are given the mandate to subdue nature, master the cosmos, and transform the world "into a domain for their power and sovereignty." Adam I is majestic man who approaches the world and relationships—even with the divine—in functional, pragmatic terms. Adam I, created in the image of God, fulfills this apparently "secular" mandate by conquering the universe, imposing his knowledge, technology, and cultural institutions upon the world. The human capacity for relationship, as depicted in Genesis 1, is utilitarian, following both God's mandate and our own worldly need to develop the world for ourselves and our continuing existence.

Soloveitchik identifies the second image of Adam in chapter two of Genesis. Whereas Adam I was mandated to subdue the garden, Adam II is the contractual man," the keeper of the garden who tills and preserves it. This image is introduced by the words, "It is not good for man to be alone" - and through God's intervention and Adam's sacrifice (of a metaphoric rib) he gains companionship and the relief of his existential loneliness - unlike Adam I, this covenantal community requires the participation of the Divine. In the second chapter of God's creation, it is not enough for man to simply be created in his image and given a fiefdom. Adam II is "the lonely man of faith," the "redemptive Adam," bringing a "redemptive interpretation to the meaning of existence".

Soloveitchik does not declare one image of Adam to be the right one, but rather identifies the struggle we must undergo as human beings in this existence, given by God, that is both spiritual and material, mystical and scientific, redemptive yet empowered.
