= Mosholu Jewish Center =

Former Orthodox synagogue in New York City

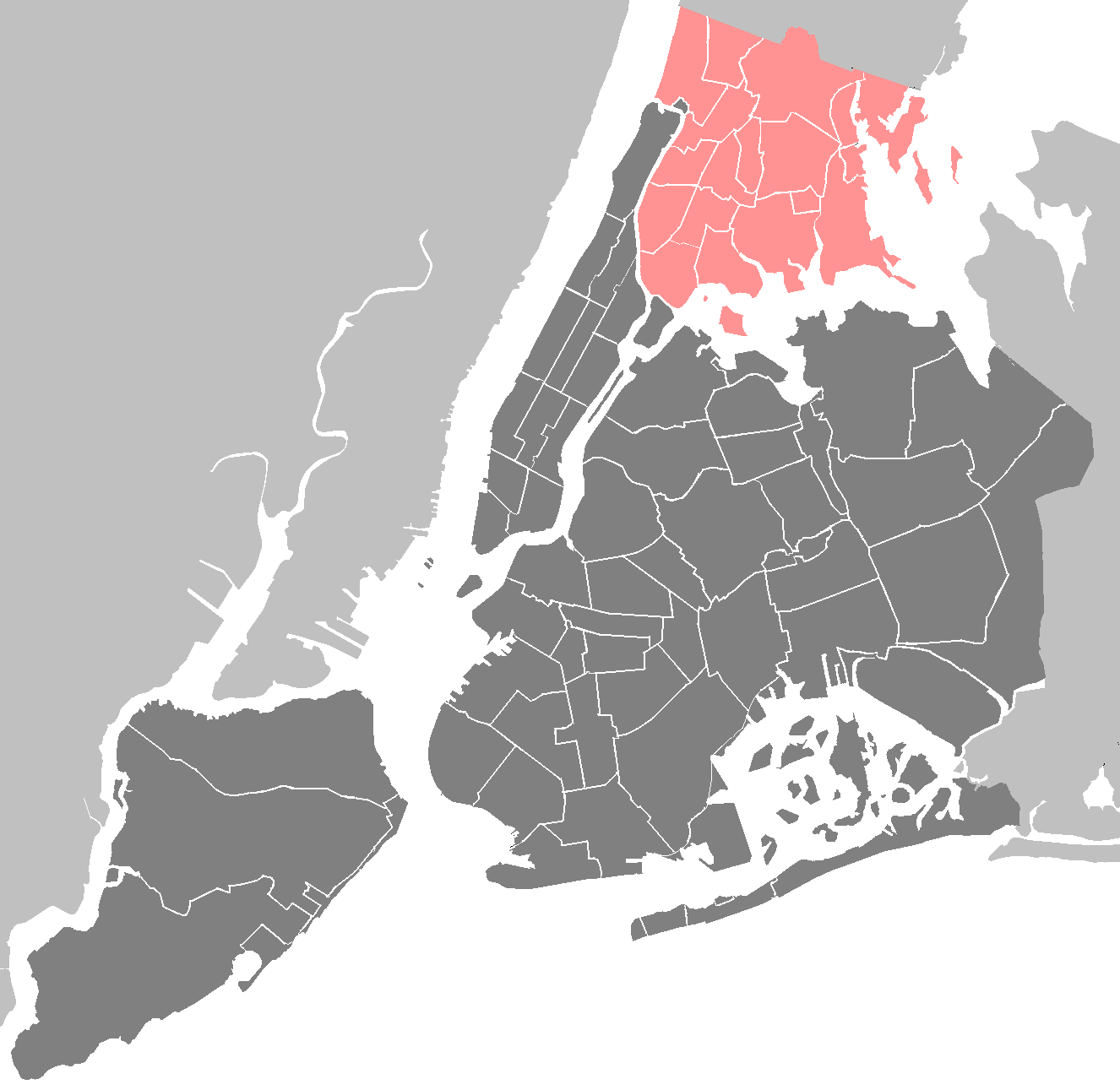
- Location in the Bronx, New York City

Religion
- Affiliation: Orthodox Judaism (former); Roman Catholicism (current)
- Ecclesiastical or organizational status: Synagogue (1927 – 1999); Pre-school (since 2003)
- Ownership: Roman Catholic Archdiocese of New York
- Status: Closed; repurposed

Location
- Location: 3044 Hull Avenue, Norwood, The Bronx, New York City, New York
- Country: United States
- Interactive map of Mosholu Jewish Center
- Coordinates: 40°52′17″N 73°52′46″W

Architecture
- Type: Synagogue
- Style: Neo-Renaissance
- Established: 1927 (as a congregation)
- Completed: 1927

The Mosholu Jewish Center was an Orthodox Jewish community center and synagogue located at 3044 Hull Avenue, in the Norwood, Bronx neighborhood in New York City. The building is now used as a pre-school.

== History ==
The synagogue was founded in 1927, and closed in 1999 due to the declining Jewish population of the Bronx. Rabbi Herschel Schacter led the congregation from 1947 to its 1999 close.

The Neo-Renaissance building was sold to the Roman Catholic Archdiocese of New York in 2000 and repurposed in 2003 as the Head Start pre-school program.
