= Hershel Reichman =

Orthodox Jewish rabbi

Rabbi Hershel Reichman

Rosh Yeshiva, Rabbi Isaac Elchanan Theological Seminary
- Incumbent
- Assumed office 2006

Personal details
- Born: February 18, 1944 (age 82)
- Occupation: Orthodox rabbi, rosh yeshiva

Hershel Reichman (Hebrew: רב צבי יוסף רייכמן) (born February 18, 1944) is an Orthodox rabbi and rosh yeshiva of Rabbi Isaac Elchanan Theological Seminary, an affiliate of Yeshiva University.

== Education ==
Reichman received a BA from Yeshiva University and Ph.D. in Operations Research from New York University (NYU). Reichman considers himself primarily a student of the twentieth century Talmudic genius Rabbi Joseph B. Soloveitchik. However, Reichman officially received his rabbinical ordination (semicha) from Rabbi Moshe Feinstein, with whom he studied Jewish Law in a private tutorial. In addition, Reichman is known for his passionate support of Religious Zionism.

== Books ==
Rabbi Hershel Reichman, has authored seven volumes of Reshimos Shiurim which are lucid notes and explanations of Rabbi Soloveitchik's lectures on specific sections of the Talmud. These include the Mesechtot ("Tractates") of Sukkah, Shevuot, Nedarim, Bava Kamma, Berachot and Yevamot. The Rav gave shiur for one year on the particularly challenging tractate of Yevamot in the year of 1962–63. Additionally, Rav Reichman is a teacher of Hasidism, and is particularly fond of the philosophy of the Shem Mishmuel.

== Professorship ==
Reichman became the newest member of the Rabbi Isaac Elchanan Theological Seminary faculty to occupy an endowed chair when he was invested by President Richard M. Joel as the Bronka Weintraub Professor of Talmud on September 18, 2006 in the Harry Fischel Beit Midrash of Zysman Hall on the Wilf Campus. Reichman also gives a weekly shiur at Rambam Mesivta in Lawrence, NY.

== Family ==
Reichman's father was born in Belz, Poland to a family of Belzer Hasidic Jews. After World War II, Reichman's grandfather served as an emissary of the Belzer Rebbe, Rabbi Aharon Rokeach.

One of Rabbi Reichman's sons, Rabbi Zev Reichman, is a teacher in the Isaac Breuer College of Hebraic Studies and Rebecca Ivry Department of Jewish Studies at Yeshiva University. He is the author of Flames of Faith: An Introduction to Chassidic Thought—adapted from the Torah classes of Rabbi Moshe Wolfson—and the translator of Remove Anger from Your Heart: A Torah Guide to Patience, Tolerance, and Emotional Well Being (הסר כעס מלבך, Haseir Ka'as Milbekha).

Another of Rabbi Reichman's sons, Rabbi Moshe Nechemia Reichman, is a senior rosh mesivta of Yeshivat Torat Shraga in Israel. A third son Rav Yitzchak Reichman is a Rebbi in the NY/NJ area.

Reichman resides in Washington Heights, Manhattan.
