= Jacob J. Schacter =

American Orthodox rabbi (born 1950)

Rabbi Jacob J. Schacter

Rabbi of Young Israel of Sharon
- In office 1977–1981

Rabbi of the Jewish Center (Manhattan)
- In office 1981–2000

Dean of the Rabbi Joseph B Soloveitchik Institute
- In office 2000–2005

Personal details
- Born: 1950 (age 75–76)
- Parent(s): Rabbi Herschel Schacter, Pnina Gewirtz Schacter
- Education: Harvard University, Yeshiva Torah Vodaas, Brooklyn College
- Occupation: University Professor of Jewish History and Jewish Thought, Senior Scholar
- Known for: A Modern Heretic and a Traditional Community: Mordecai M. Kaplan, Orthodoxy, and American Judaism

Jacob J. Schacter (born 1950) is an American Orthodox rabbi. Schacter, a historian of intellectual trends in Orthodox Judaism, is University Professor of Jewish History and Jewish Thought and Senior Scholar at the Center for the Jewish Future at Yeshiva University.

== Biography ==
Schacter, the son of Pnina Gewirtz Schacter and Rabbi Herschel Schacter, grew up in New York City's Bronx neighborhood.

Schacter holds a Ph.D. in Near Eastern Languages from Harvard University and received rabbinic ordination from Yeshiva Torah Vodaas in 1973. He graduated from Brooklyn College in 1973. He lives in Teaneck, New Jersey.

According to Jacob Katz, Schacter's thesis, "Rabbi Jacob Emden: Life and Major Works" (unpublished Ph.D. dissertation, Harvard University, 1988), "supplanted" Mortimer J. Cohen's 1937 book Jacob Emden: A Man of Controversy, as the most authoritative source on Emden.

Schacter is an historian of intellectual trends in Orthodox Judaism. Schacter is regarded as following "the ideological tradition" of Joseph B. Soloveitchik. His 1997 book, A Modern Heretic and a Traditional Community: Mordecai M. Kaplan, Orthodoxy and American Judaism, was about the "complicated relationship" between Mordecai Kaplan, an Orthodox rabbi who left that movement to found Reconstructionist Judaism. Before leaving Orthodoxy, Kaplan had been Rabbi of the Jewish Center (Manhattan), the congregation that Schacter would later lead.

While still a graduate student, Schacter became the first Rabbi of Young Israel of Sharon, in Sharon, Massachusetts. Serving in this capacity from 1977 - 1981, he created a new, vibrant, and committed community. He became Rabbi of the prestigious Jewish Center in Manhattan in 1981. Under his leadership, the congregation more than tripled in size, with new members attracted by "the intellectual seriousness of the rabbi's sermons and lectures.

In 2000, he moved to Massachusetts where he became dean of the Rabbi Joseph B Soloveitchik Institute in Brookline, a position he held until 2005, when he left to become Senior Scholar and University Professor at Yeshiva University's new Center for the Jewish Future (initially called the Center for the Jewish People).

== Published works ==
=== Author ===
- "A Modern Heretic and a Traditional Community: Mordecai M. Kaplan, Orthodoxy, and American Judaism." Coauthor with Jeffrey S. Gurock, Columbia University Press (1997)

=== Editor ===
- "Reverence, Righteousness and Rahamanut: Essays in Memory of Rabbi Dr. Leo Jung" (1992)
- "Jewish Tradition and The Nontraditional Jew" (1992)
- "Judaism's Encounter with other Cultures: Rejection or Integration?" (1997)
- "The Complete Service for the Period of Bereavement" (1995)
