= Saul Berman =

American rabbi, Jewish Studies professor, author

Rabbi Saul J. Berman
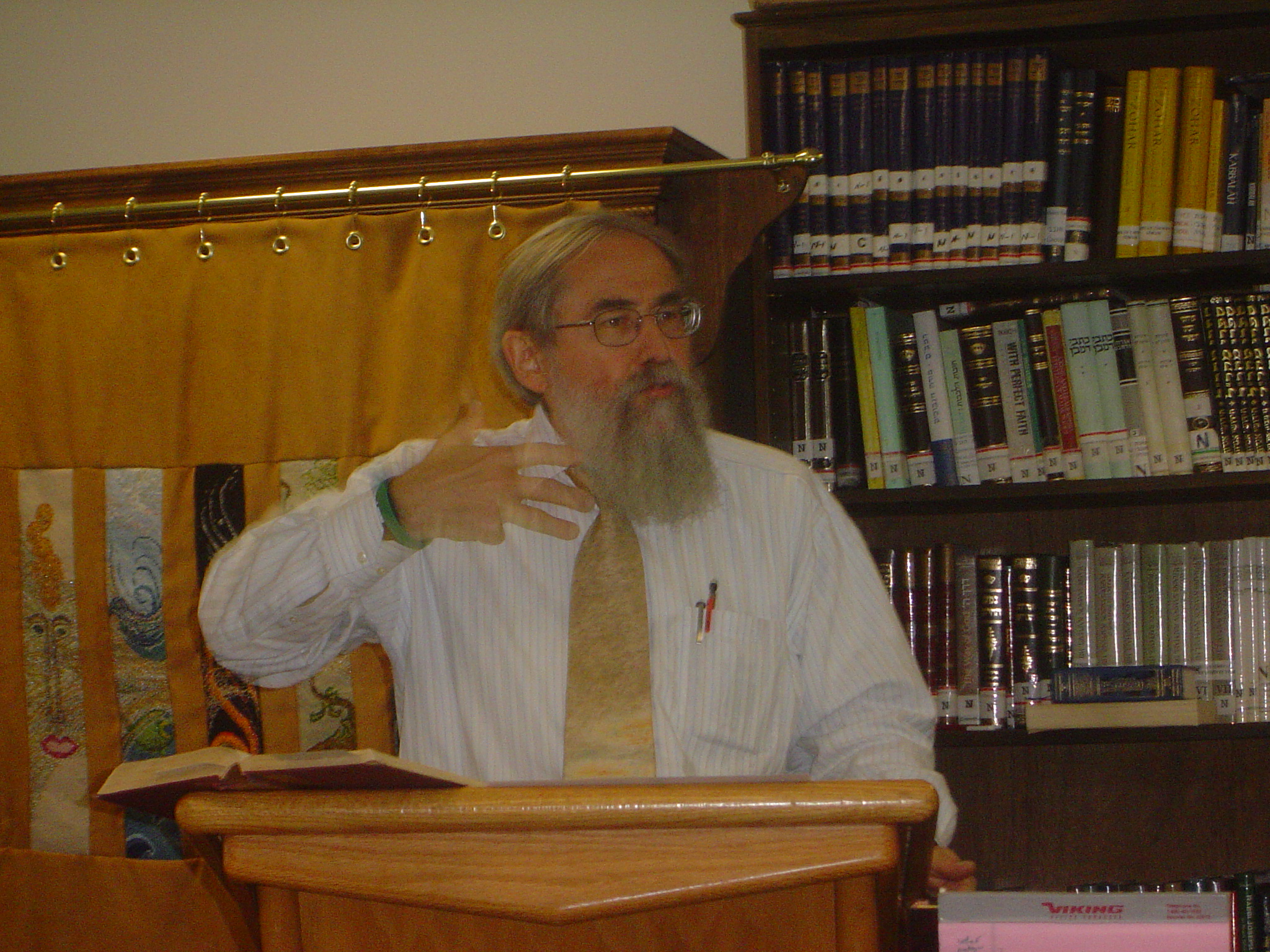
- Rabbi Saul Berman speaking

Senior Rabbi, Lincoln Square Synagogue
- In office 1984–1990

Chairman, Department of Judaic Studies, Stern College for Women
- In office 1971–1984

Director of Edah
- Incumbent
- Assumed office 1997

Associate Professor of Jewish Studies, Yeshiva University
- Incumbent
- Assumed office 1990

Personal details
- Born: April 30, 1939 (age 87)
- Education: Yeshiva University, New York University, University of California, Berkeley, Hebrew University of Jerusalem, Tel Aviv University
- Occupation: Rabbi, Professor
- Known for: Contributed to Encyclopedia Judaica

Saul J. Berman (born April 30, 1939) is an American scholar and Modern Orthodox rabbi.

Berman was ordained at Yeshiva University, from which he also received his B.A. and his M.H.L. He completed a degree in law, a J.D., at New York University, and an M.A. in political science at the University of California, Berkeley, where he studied with David Daube. He spent two years studying mishpat ivri in Israel at Hebrew University of Jerusalem and at Tel Aviv University.

== Career ==
Berman was the rabbi of Congregation Beth Israel (Berkeley, California) from 1963 to 1969, of Young Israel of Brookline from 1969 to 1971. In 1971, following his departure from Young Israel of Brookline Berman was appointed Chairman of the Department of Judaic Studies of Stern College for Women of Yeshiva University. Under his leadership over the next thirteen years, it grew into the largest undergraduate Department of Jewish Studies in the United States.

In 1984, he accepted the position as senior rabbi of Lincoln Square Synagogue in Manhattan, New York where he served until 1990. During those years, he spearheaded an expansion of the adult education program, the creation of an extensive social action program based on frum commitments, the growth of the Synagogue's Women's Tefillah Group, and the creation of new outreach programs to the unaffiliated.

In 1990, Berman returned to academic life, as associate professor of Jewish Studies at Stern College, and as an adjunct professor at Columbia University School of Law, where he teaches a seminar in Jewish Law. From 1995 to 1997, he served as Scholar in Residence at the JCC on the Palisades in New Jersey.

=== Edah ===
In 1997, Berman became the Founding Director of Edah, a new organization devoted to the invigoration of modern Orthodox ideology and religious life.

Due to financial constraints, Edah was absorbed into Yeshivat Chovevei Torah, at which Berman took on an administrative position.

He now serves as an associate professor at Yeshiva University and teaches at Columbia University Law School.

== Works ==
Berman contributed to the Encyclopedia Judaica and is the author of numerous articles which have been published in journals such as Tradition, Judaism, Journal of Jewish Studies, Dinei Yisrael, and many others.
