= Yeshivat Chovevei Torah =

Modern Orthodox yeshiva, founded in 1999 by Rabbi Avi Weiss

Coordinates: 40°53′15.99″N 73°54′37.41″W

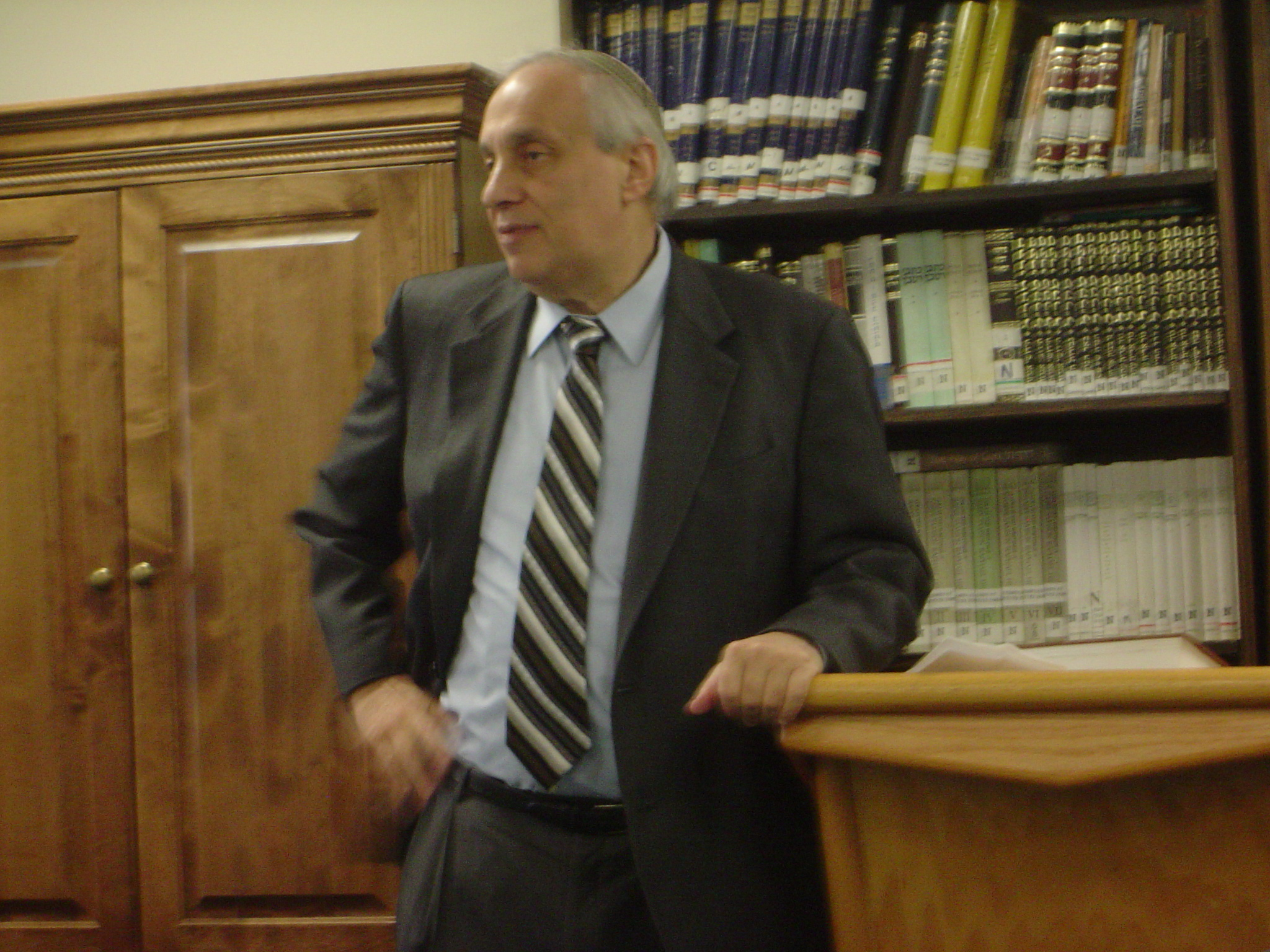
- Rabbi Avi Weiss speaking at Yeshivat Chovevei Torah Rabbinical School on 19 November 2007.
- Established: 1999
- Founders: Rabbi Avi Weiss and Rabbi Dov Linzer
- Location: 3700 Henry Hudson Parkway, Riverdale, Bronx, New York
- Website: yctorah.org

Yeshivat Chovevei Torah Rabbinical School (YCT) is a Modern Orthodox yeshiva founded in 1999 by Rabbi Avi Weiss.

Currently located in the Riverdale neighborhood of the Bronx, New York, YCT's declared mission is to educate and place rabbis who are "open, non-judgmental, knowledgeable, empathetic, and eager to transform Orthodoxy into a movement that meaningfully and respectfully interacts with all Jews, regardless of affiliation, commitment, or background." Its core values include a passionate commitment to the study of Torah and the scrupulous observance of halakha (Jewish law); intellectual openness and critical thinking in one's religious life; expanding the role of women in Judaism; commitment to the broader Jewish community; and a responsibility to improve the world and to care for every human being in it regardless of faith.

YCT's rabbinic education program combines a classical curriculum in Tanakh, Talmud, and the codes of Jewish law with a program in pastoral counseling, leadership retreats, education in fundraising, and other realities of contemporary religious leadership. YCT ordained its first graduating class of rabbis in June 2004 and has continued to do so every June since. Its current president and Rosh Yeshiva (head of school) is Rabbi Dov Linzer.

In addition to its rabbinical studies program, the yeshiva offers a public Jewish educational program in association with the Hebrew Institute of Riverdale at its Bronx location. YCT also runs a variety of events open to the entire Jewish community, including its annual yemei iyun ("study days") on Bible and Jewish thought and a public lecture series.

Many establishment institutions in the Orthodox community in America, including the Orthodox Rabbinical Council of America and Agudath Israel of America have opposed YCT, framing it as an entity which has strayed from traditional Orthodox norms.

== History ==
The origins of Yeshivat Chovevei Torah go back to 1996 when rabbis Avi Weiss and Saul Berman founded a program known as MeORoT that provided supplemental lectures on issues in liberal Orthodoxy to rabbinical students enrolled in Yeshiva University. At the time, the fellowship was co-sponsored by Yeshiva University, Edah, and Weiss's synagogue, the Hebrew Institute of Riverdale.

In September 1999, Weiss and Linzer launched Yeshivat Chovevei Torah as an undergraduate learning program primarily for students at Columbia University and Barnard College. The YCT University Program had Linzer as its Rosh HaYeshiva and was housed at Congregation Ramath Orah, a Modern Orthodox congregation on 110th Street in Manhattan.

In January 2000, the leadership of the YCT university program, which consisted of Weiss, Berman, Linzer, and Dov Weiss, decided to create a rabbinical school that would officially open in September 2000. In September 2000, the rabbinical school welcomed its first class of seven students.

YCT ordained its first rabbi in 2003, its first graduating class of rabbis in June 2004, and 27 rabbis by June 2006.

Controversies over YCT came to a head when, in 2006, YCT applied for membership in the Rabbinical Council of America, the rabbinical body affiliated with the Orthodox Union, the largest North American Modern and Centrist Orthodox body. YCT subsequently withdrew its application when it became apparent that the application would be denied.

After spending five years housed at Columbia's Hillel, the school left Manhattan in the summer of 2010 and moved to the Hebrew Institute of Riverdale.

As of June 2019, the school had ordained 134 rabbis and had a stated placement rate of nearly 100%. YCT graduates, who are not eligible for RCA membership, can join the International Rabbinic Fellowship, an organization co-founded in 2008 by Avi Weiss and Marc Angel.

=== Terminology ===
For its first 15 years YCT described itself as an "Open Orthodoxy" institution and its mission statement made heavy use of the term coined by Avi Weiss. The term and concept provoked harsh criticism and were rejected by other Orthodox institutions. Sylvia Barack Fishman, a professor of Judaic studies at Brandeis University stated that some critics used the term Open Orthodox derogatorily rather than descriptively to delegitimize Modern Orthodox Jews who support women's leadership in Judaism.

Since then, YCT has distanced itself from the term. In an interview with The Jewish Week in August 2017, Rabbi Asher Lopatin, the school's then-president, said: "When they say, 'Open Orthodox,' I say, 'We are Modern Orthodox. We are a full part of Modern Orthodoxy.'" The affiliated women's rabbinical seminary, Yeshivat Maharat, also uses "Modern Orthodox" to describe itself.

== Curriculum and pastoral counseling program ==
YCT's curriculum is supplemented by a strong focus on the Bible and Jewish thought. YCT states that the classical approaches to subject matters are complemented by academic and innovative methodologies.

One of the more innovative areas of YCT's curriculum is an unprecedented emphasis on pastoral care and professional development. Whereas it is common in other rabbinical schools to offer a semester or year of pastoral counseling courses, YCT's program spans the entire four-year curriculum. The pastoral counseling program is taught by leading psychiatric professionals and includes formal classroom instruction, role-playing, clinical experience, and mentored fieldwork. The program places particular emphasis on topics that rabbis regularly encounter; topics such as religious doubt and personal change; rites of passage; adolescence; substance abuse; marital and family problems; sexual function and dysfunction; homosexuality; domestic violence; loss, tragedy, and bereavement; and response to catastrophe.

The first-year courses are organized around basic principles of counseling. The second-year courses follow the life cycle, giving an overview of normal development as well as addressing potential difficulties. In their third and fourth years, students take seminars in chaplaincy, marital and family therapy, and psychology and religion. Fieldwork with direct clinical supervision is an essential part of the curriculum.

One of the other hallmarks of the YCT pastoral counseling program is the introduction of the process group. A common feature of graduate psychology programs is a process group consisting of students from a given class year who meet weekly with a mental health professional throughout the full four years of the program. In this completely confidential setting, students are free to explore issues of faith, authority, training, personal situation, etc.

== Faculty and administration ==
The yeshiva is led by Rabbi Dov Linzer, who has served as President and Rosh Yeshiva since 2018. He succeeded Asher Lopatin, who was the second president of the school from July 2013 to July 2018, following Avi Weiss. Linzer had previously served as the dean of YCT from 2007 to 2014, succeeding Weiss. Since 2022, the dean of YCT has been Rabbi Haggai Resnikoff.

Other faculty members include rabbis Ysoscher Katz, Nathaniel Helfgot, Chaim Marder, Miriam Schacter, and Michelle Friedman.

== Student body and alumni ==
When the rabbinical school was founded, its first class had only 7 members. After what Yeshiva University's student newspaper, The Commentator, called in 2002 an "aggressive marketing campaign", some young men who previously would have considered Yeshiva University's rabbinical school began attending YCT. A 2007 YU Commentator article reported YCT's enrollment to be 43 full-time students.

As of 2019, YCT had ordained over 130 rabbis serving throughout the U.S. and around the world in synagogues, on college campuses, as teachers and administrators, chaplains, religious entrepreneurs, leaders of Jewish institutions, and more.

== Absorption of EDAH functions ==
In July 2006, YCT officials announced that they would absorb some of the personnel and functions of the liberal Orthodox advocacy organization EDAH, which had announced its closure and became defunct. YCT assumed EDAH's journal, website, and audio-visual library. The school also took on EDAH's founding director, Rabbi Saul Berman, for a position as Director of Continuing Rabbinic Education.

== Role of women in Judaism ==
Yeshivat Chovevei Torah, (Yeshivat Maharat notwithstanding), accepts only male candidates for ordination. However, YCT, unlike a number of rabbis and institutions within Orthodox Judaism, has promoted expanded roles for women in ritual life and religious leadership. Founder Avi Weiss explained:

Yeshivat Chovevei Torah Rabbinical School, as an Orthodox institution, requires that its students daven only in synagogues with mechitzot [partitions for the separation of men and women]. The phenomenon of women receiving aliyot in a mechitza minyan is currently being debated on both a halachic and communal level within the Modern Orthodox community. YCT Rabbinical School does not currently take a position on this issue.

In June 2009, Weiss created the title MaHaRaT for Sara Hurwitz. He expressed his desire to have called her a rabbi, stating "She can do 95 percent of what other rabbis do". She was later titled "Rabba", a feminine version of the word "rabbi", despite female rabbis in other movements being called "rabbi". This led to complaints from the RCA, which led to Weiss stating he would not name future graduates as "rabba". Weiss subsequently resigned from the RCA. However, Yeshivat Maharat, which Weiss founded, allows its ordainees to choose their own titles, and in 2015 ordained Yaffa Epstein took the title Rabba. Also in 2015, Lila Kagedan was ordained by that same organization, and chose for herself the title Rabbi, making her their first graduate to take that title.

== Homosexuality ==
Yeshivat Chovevei Torah ordained Tadhg Cleary in June 2025, making him the first openly gay rabbi ordained by an American Orthodox institution. However, Yeshivat Chovevei Torah did make it clear that Cleary could not marry his partner while enrolled (and he agreed to this.) As a result of its stance on homosexuality, the Rabbinical Council of America does not accredit Yeshivat Chovevei Torah, effectively blocking its graduates from holding pulpit positions at most Orthodox synagogues in the United States.

== Controversy ==
The Orthodox Rabbinical Council of America does not accept the YCT's ordination as valid for membership. At a May 2014 gala, one member of the Moetzes Gedolei HaTorah, Rabbi Yaakov Perlow, called Open Orthodoxy heretical. In the fall of 2015, the Agudath Israel of America denounced moves to ordain women and declared Yeshivat Chovevei Torah, Yeshivat Maharat, Open Orthodoxy, and other affiliated entities as not a form of Torah Judaism, similar to other dissident movements throughout Jewish history in having rejected basic tenets of Judaism.

== Books and journals ==
- Halakhic Realities: Collected Essays on Brain Death, ed. Zev Farber, Maggid Books, 2015. ISBN 978-1592644063
- Halakhic Realities: Collected Essays on Organ Donation, ed. Zev Farber, Maggid Books, 2016. ISBN 978-1592644070
- Helfgot, Nathaniel, ed., The Yeshivat Chovevei Torah Tanakh Companion to the Book of Samuel, Ben Yehuda Press, October 2006 ISBN 0-9769862-4-8
- Milin Havivin/Beloved Words – The Torah Journal of Yeshivat Chovevei Torah Rabbinical School

== See also ==
- International Rabbinic Fellowship
- Open Orthodoxy
- Yeshivat Maharat
