= Herschel Schacter =

American rabbi

Rabbi Herschel Schacter
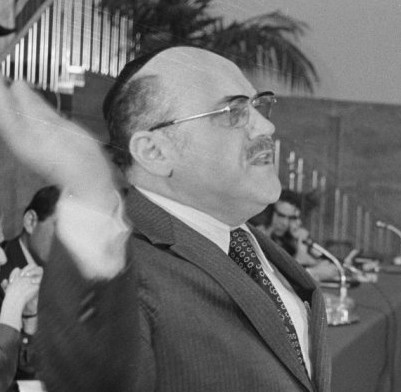
- Herschel Schacter speaking in 1971

Rabbi of the Mosholu Jewish Center
- In office 1947–1999

Chairman of the Conference of Presidents of Major American Jewish Organizations

Personal details
- Born: October 10, 1917 Brownsville, Brooklyn
- Died: March 21, 2013 (aged 95)
- Occupation: Rabbi

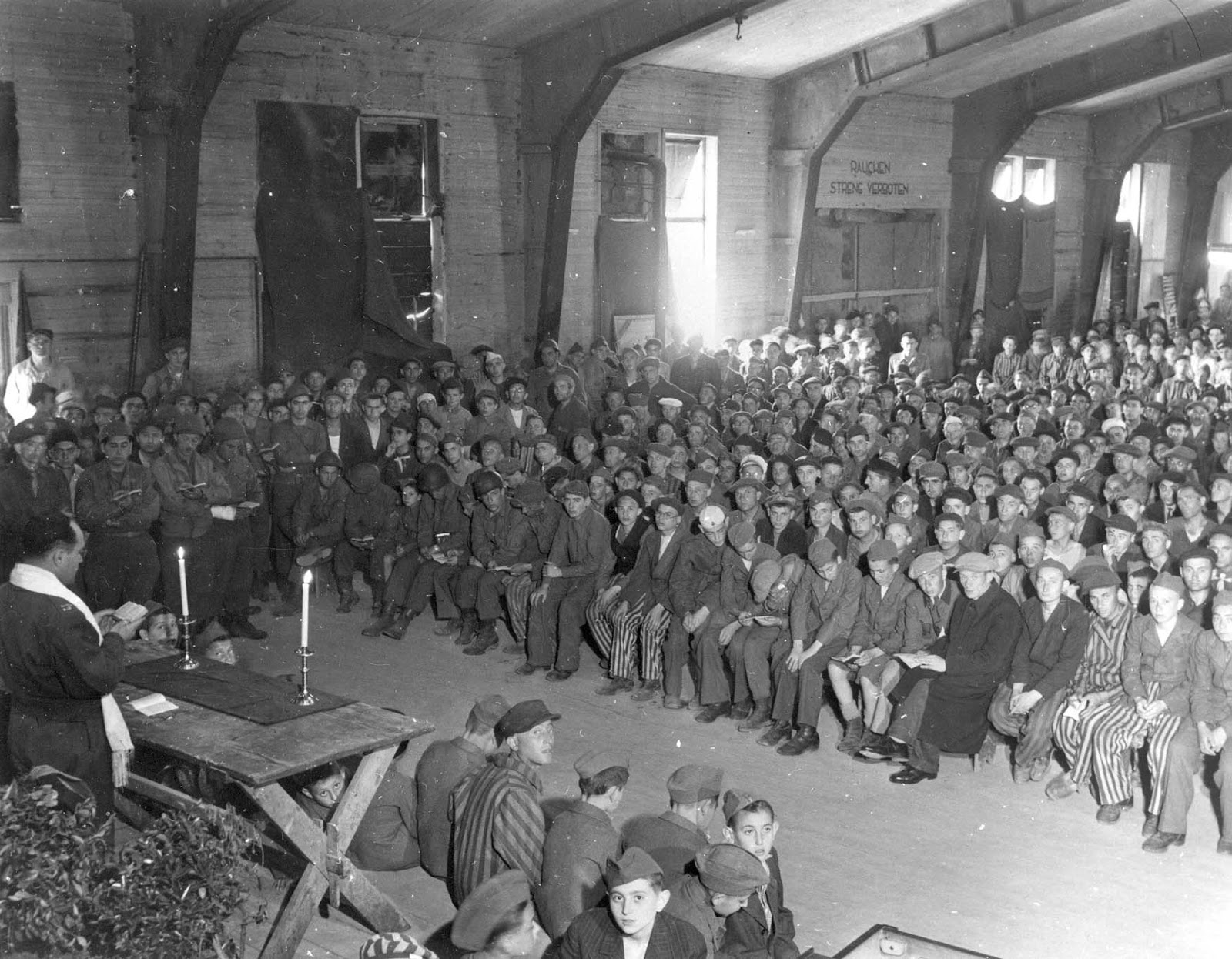
American chaplain Rabbi Herschel Schacter conducts religious services at the liberated Buchenwald concentration camp in 1945.

Herschel Schacter (October 10, 1917 – March 21, 2013) was an American Orthodox rabbi and chairman of the Conference of Presidents of Major American Jewish Organizations.

== Early life ==
Schacter was born in Brownsville, Brooklyn, the youngest of 10 siblings. His parents immigrated to the US from Poland. His father, Pincus, was a seventh-generation shochet, or ritual slaughterer; his mother, the former Miriam Schimmelman, was a real estate manager.

His education included Yeshiva Rabbi Chaim Berlin, Mesivta Torah Vodaath, and Yeshiva College.

Schacter was protege of Chabad rabbi Yisroel Jacobson, and a student of Rabbi Joseph B. Soloveitchik. He earned a bachelor's degree from Yeshiva University in New York City in 1938 and semikhah (rabbinic ordination) from the Rabbi Isaac Elchanan Theological Seminary in 1941.

== Career ==
He spent about a year as a pulpit rabbi in Stamford, Connecticut before enlisting in the Army in 1942.

During World War II, he was a chaplain in the Third Army's VIII Corps and was the first US Army Chaplain to enter and participate in the liberation of the Buchenwald concentration camp on April 11, 1945, barely an hour after it had been liberated by George Patton's troops. Schacter remained at Buchenwald for months, tending to survivors and leading religious services. One of the children whom he personally rescued from the camp was then 7-year old Yisrael Meir Lau, who grew up to become the Ashkenazi Chief Rabbi of Israel. Later he aided in the resettlement of displaced persons, one of whom was teenaged Elie Wiesel, one of some thousand Jewish orphans liberated that day. He was discharged from the Army with the rank of captain.

Schacter was the rabbi of the Mosholu Jewish Center in the Bronx from 1947 till it closed in 1999.

In 1956 he went to the Soviet Union with an American rabbinic delegation as advocate for the rights of Soviet Jews. He also served as an adviser on the subject to President Richard Nixon.

In 1971 Rabbi Schacter headed up the intra-denominational effort to maintain the Divinity exemption in the Vietnam draft. In this he was aided by Rabbi Moshe Sherer, president of Agudath Israel of America, Rabbi Herman Neuberger, Rav Moshe Feinstein, Rav Shneur Kotler, Rav Boruch Sorotzkin, Rav Gedalia Schorr, Rav Aaron Schechter, and Rabbi Yaakov Perlow.

== Death ==
Schacter lived in the Riverdale, Bronx and died March 21, 2013. He was 95. His wife, the former Pnina Gewirtz, whom he married in 1948, died October 31, 2018. They were survived by a son, Jacob J. Schacter, the former director of the Soloveitchik Institute; a daughter, Miriam Schacter; four grandchildren; and eight great-grandchildren.
