= Onset, Massachusetts =

- Census-designated place
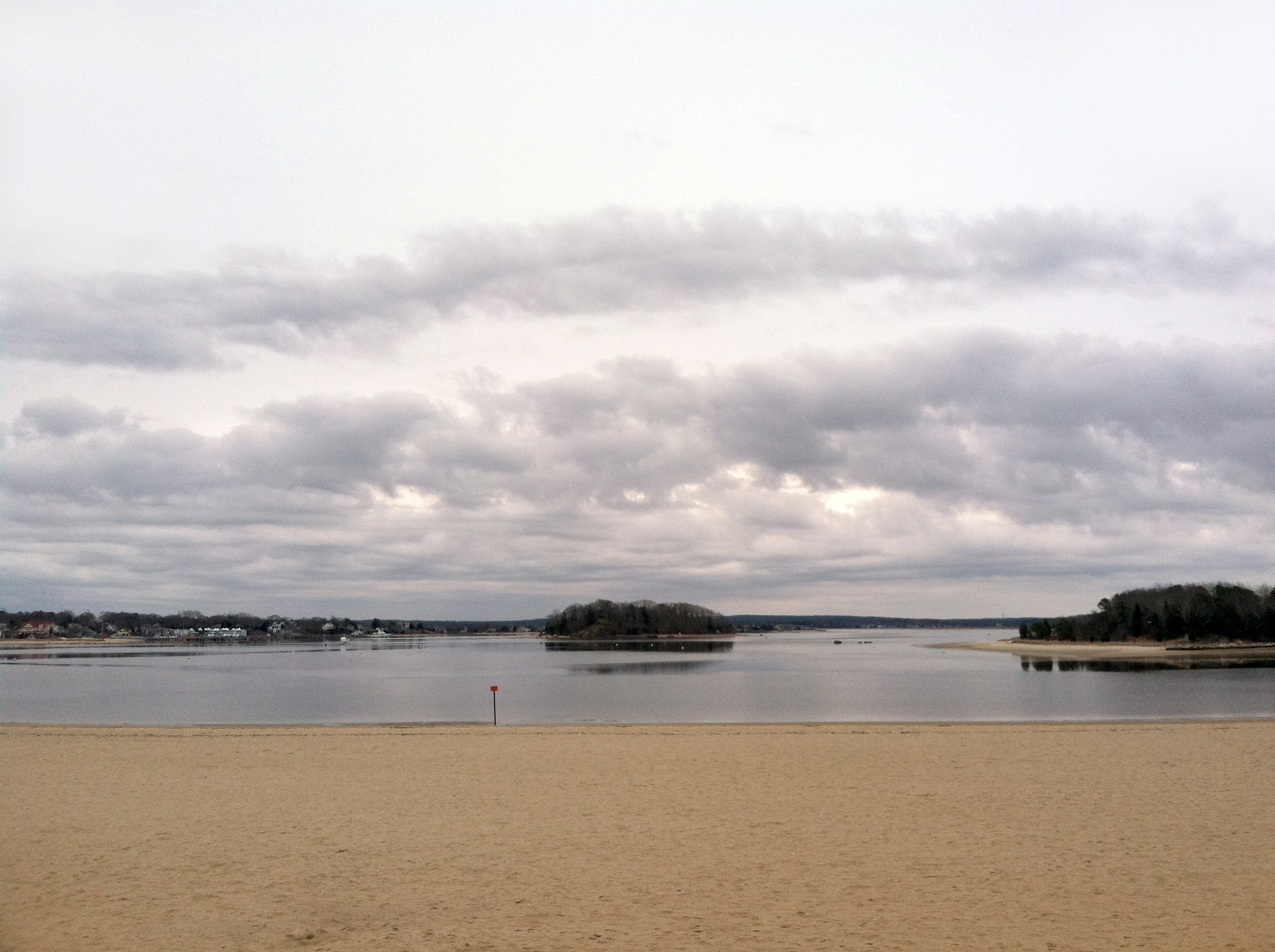
- Onset Beach
- Nickname: 'Tesno' '0 Block'
- Location in Plymouth County in Massachusetts
- Coordinates: 41°44′47″N 70°39′48″W
- Country: United States
- State: Massachusetts
- County: Plymouth

Area
  - Total: 1.29 sq mi (3.35 km^{2})
  - Land: 1.08 sq mi (2.79 km^{2})
  - Water: 0.22 sq mi (0.56 km^{2})
- Elevation: 9.8 ft (3 m)

Population (2020)
  - Total: 1,617
  - Density: 1,499.6/sq mi (579.01/km^{2})
- Time zone: UTC−5 (Eastern (EST))
  - Summer (DST): UTC−4 (EDT)
- ZIP Codes: 02558 (Onset); 02538 (East Wareham)
- Area code: 508
- FIPS code: 25-51160
- GNIS feature ID: 0615548

Onset is a census-designated place (CDP) in the town of Wareham, Massachusetts, United States. As of the 2020 census, Onset had a population of 1,617.

== Geography ==
Onset is located at 41°44′47″N 70°39′48″W (41.746424, −70.663251).

According to the United States Census Bureau, the CDP has a total area of 3.4 km^{2} (1.3 mi^{2}), of which 2.8 km^{2} (1.1 mi^{2}) is land and 0.6 km^{2} (0.2 mi^{2}) (16.92%) is water.

== Demographics ==
Historical population
Census	Pop.	Note	%±
2020	1,617		—
U.S. Decennial Census

=== 2020 census ===
As of the 2020 census, Onset had a population of 1,617. The median age was 52.7 years. 14.7% of residents were under the age of 18 and 27.8% of residents were 65 years of age or older. For every 100 females there were 88.9 males, and for every 100 females age 18 and over there were 85.6 males age 18 and over.

100.0% of residents lived in urban areas, while 0.0% lived in rural areas.

There were 771 households in Onset, of which 15.7% had children under the age of 18 living in them. Of all households, 28.9% were married-couple households, 23.1% were households with a male householder and no spouse or partner present, and 37.7% were households with a female householder and no spouse or partner present. About 40.7% of all households were made up of individuals and 18.7% had someone living alone who was 65 years of age or older.

There were 1,218 housing units, of which 36.7% were vacant. The homeowner vacancy rate was 3.1% and the rental vacancy rate was 4.0%.

Racial composition as of the 2020 census
Race	Number	Percent
White	1,247	77.1%
Black or African American	58	3.6%
American Indian and Alaska Native	13	0.8%
Asian	16	1.0%
Native Hawaiian and Other Pacific Islander	1	0.1%
Some other race	89	5.5%
Two or more races	193	11.9%
Hispanic or Latino (of any race)	41	2.5%

=== 2000 census ===
At the 2000 census there were 1,292 people, 568 households, and 323 families in the CDP. The population density was 461.9/km^{2} (1,192.7/mi^{2}). There were 910 housing units at an average density of 325.3/km^{2} (840.1/mi^{2}). The racial makeup of the CDP was 74.46% African American, 7.74% White, 0.23% Native American, 1.24% Asian, 13.08% from other races, and 3.25% from two or more races. Hispanic or Latino of any race were 1.78%.

Of the 568 households 22.9% had children under the age of 18 living with them, 34.2% were married couples living together, 17.3% had a female householder with no husband present, and 43.0% were non-families. Of households, 35.0% were one person and 13.9% were one person aged 65 or older. The average household size was 2.27 and the average family size was 2.93.

The age distribution was 22.4% under the age of 18, 5.6% from 18 to 24, 28.6% from 25 to 44, 24.8% from 45 to 64, and 18.6% 65 or older. The median age was 41 years. For every 100 females, there were 93.4 males. For every 100 females age 18 and over, there were 88.3 males.

The median household income was $31,250 and the median family income was $36,739. Males had a median income of $37,629 versus $26,903 for females. The per capita income for the CDP was $18,088. About 13.0% of families and 23.6% of the population were below the poverty line, including 43.8% of those under age 18 and 14.0% of those age 65 or over.

== History ==
Onset was developed in the 1880s as a summer camp meeting for Spiritualists. Many of the existing cottages in Onset were built as second homes for individuals from Boston, Taunton, Brockton and other northeastern cities who gathered to hear mediums communicate with the dead. While it was run by the Spiritualists, the village was known as Onset Bay Grove.

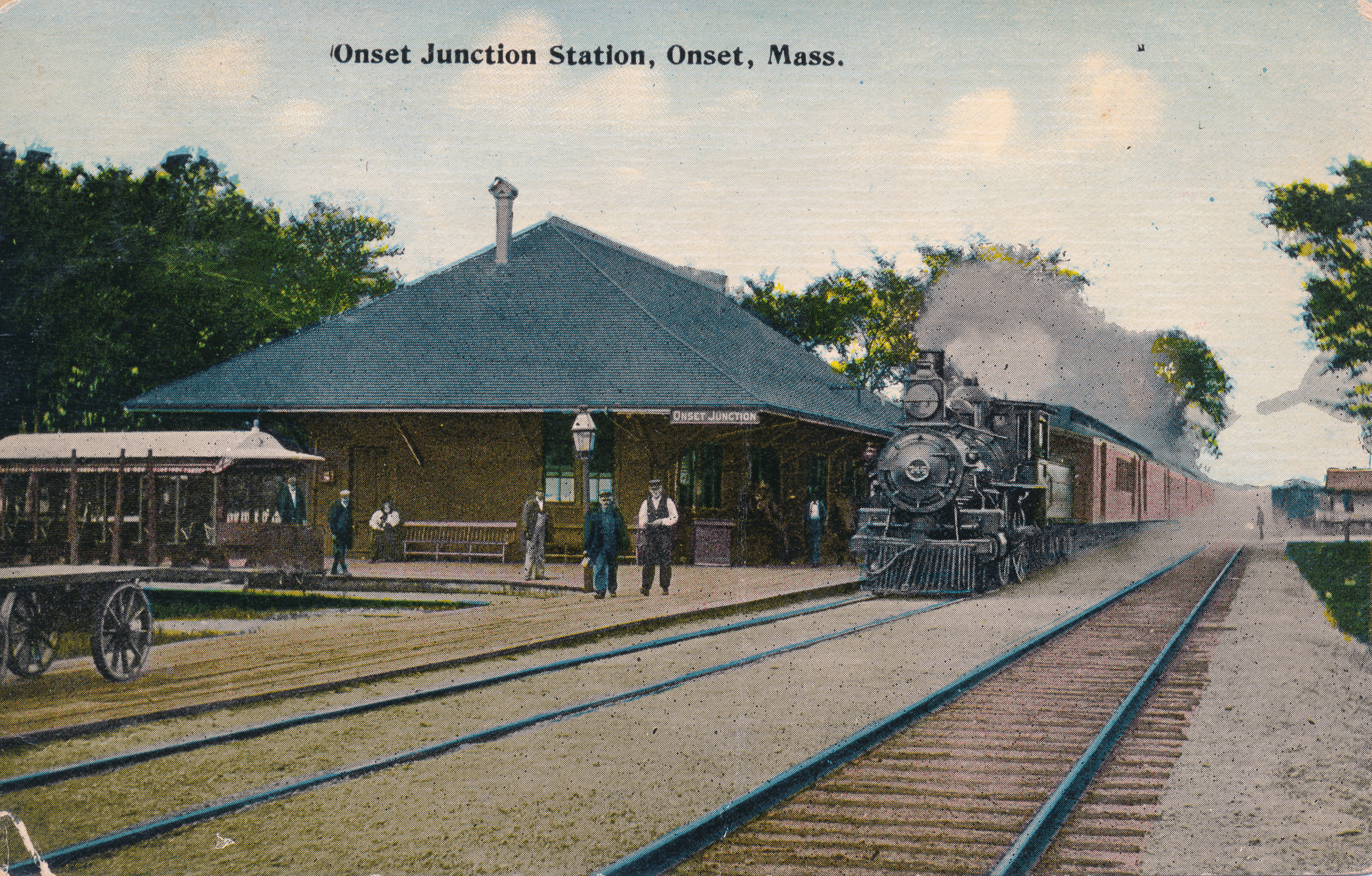
Onset Junction Station, c. 1910
