= Edah =

Modern Orthodox Jewish organization in the United States

Official logo of EDAH declares its motto.

Edah, should not be confused with the Haredi communal body in Israel known as the Edah HaChareidis.

Edah was a Modern Orthodox Jewish organization, generally associated with the liberal wing of Orthodox Judaism in the United States and with the Religious Zionism movement of Israel. Its headquarters were located in Manhattan, New York City.

Edah's motto was The Challenge to be Modern and Orthodox”.

== Opening ==
Edah was founded in 1997 in response to what its founding director, Rabbi Saul Berman, called "the separatist trend in Modern Orthodoxy." It promised in its mission statement to "give voice to the ideology and values of modern Orthodoxy and to educate and empower the community to address its concerns." Edah organized conferences, fellowships, and adult education programs, primarily in the New York metropolitan area, and to a lesser extent around the world. It also published the Edah Journal, an academic journal on Modern Orthodoxy and contemporary issues in the religious community.

The New York Times reported that Yeshiva University's biology department chairman, an ordained rabbi, "denounced Edah as 'outside the pale of Judaism'."

== Closing ==
In July 2006, Edah announced plans to close down its operations as a stand-alone entity. In a news release, leaders of the organization claimed that it had made significant achievements, but given limited financial resources available, a tactical decision was made so that its goals would be able to continue through other means.

After winding down operations, Berman took on an administrative position at Yeshivat Chovevei Torah (YCT), an Open Orthodox rabbinical school in New York City. YCT also assumed Edah’s journal, website, and audio-visual library.

The Edah Journal was rebranded as Meorot: A Forum of Modern Orthodox Discourse and its publication continued by YCT.
