= Menachem Leibtag =

Modern Orthodox rabbi

Rabbi Menachem Leibtag מנחם ליבטאג
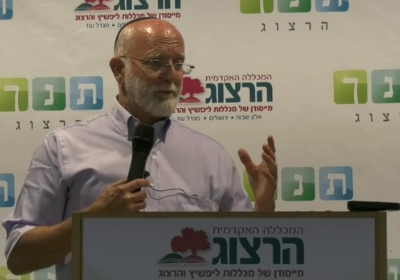
- Rabbi Leibtag lecturing at the Herzog College's Yemei Iyun B’Tanakh

Personal life
- Born: 1954 (age 71–72)
- Education: Yeshivat Har Etzion, Machon Lev

Religious life
- Religion: Judaism
- Denomination: Modern Orthodox, Religious Zionist
- Yeshiva: Yeshivat Har Etzion
- Position: Former Director of the Overseas Program
- Residence: Alon Shevut
- Semikhah: Rabbi Yehuda Amital

Menachem Leibtag (Hebrew: מנחם ליבטאג; b. 1954) is an American–Israeli Modern Orthodox and Religious Zionist rabbi, Tanach scholar and pioneer of Jewish Education on the internet. He is a leader of the "תנ"ך בגובה העיניים" ("Tanach at Eye Level") methodology and has taught several generations of Tanach scholars. He is the founder of Tanach.org and teaches at various institutions, including Yeshivat Har Etzion where he previously served as the Director of the overseas program.

== Biography ==
Leibtag was born in 1954 in Akron, Ohio, the son of Rabbi Avraham Leibtag. Leibtag moved to Israel following high school, where he attended the Jerusalem College of Technology, and then began learning at Yeshivat Har Etzion in 1977 after visiting a friend who was learning there. During this time he began attending the joint Tanach class of Rabbis Yoel Bin-Nun and Yaakov Medan, who greatly influenced Leibtag's methodology of Tanach study. He also participated in the Gush Emunim movement during this time, helping build the settlement of Ofra and maintain a Jewish presence in the Muslim quarter of the Old City of Jerusalem.

After completing the Hesder program at Yeshivat Har Etzion, Leibtag began teaching Tanach there and served as the Director of the Overseas program for over a decade. Leibtag was a member of Rabbi Aharon Lichtenstein's kollel gavoha and received his semicha from Rabbi Yehuda Amital.

Leibtag is a pioneer of Jewish Education via the Internet. He was instrumental in creating Yeshivat Har Etzion's Virtual Beit Midrash (VBM) and founded Tanach.org, also known as the Tanach Study Center (TSC). He is an exemplar of the "Tanach at Eye Level" methodology, his style and methodology of Tanach learning constitutes thematic-analytical approach which blends the methods of modern academic scholarship, including literary criticism and archeology, with traditional Jewish approaches. He also integrates textual learning of Tanach with a first-hand understanding of the geography, topography, climate, and natural features of the Land of Israel. He has served as a mentor and influence for many Tanach educators in North America and Israel, especially in the Modern Orthodox and Religious Zionist communities.

Leibtag teaches at Yeshivat Har Etzion in Alon Shevut, where he currently resides and has taught at various institutions, including Matan Women's Institute for Torah Studies, and Yeshiva University's Gruss Kollel in Jerusalem.

== Personal ==
Leibtag resides in Alon Shevut, where Yeshivat Har Etzion is located.
