= Yoel Bin-Nun =

Israeli religious Zionist rabbi

Rabbi Dr. Yoel Bin-Nun יואל בן נון
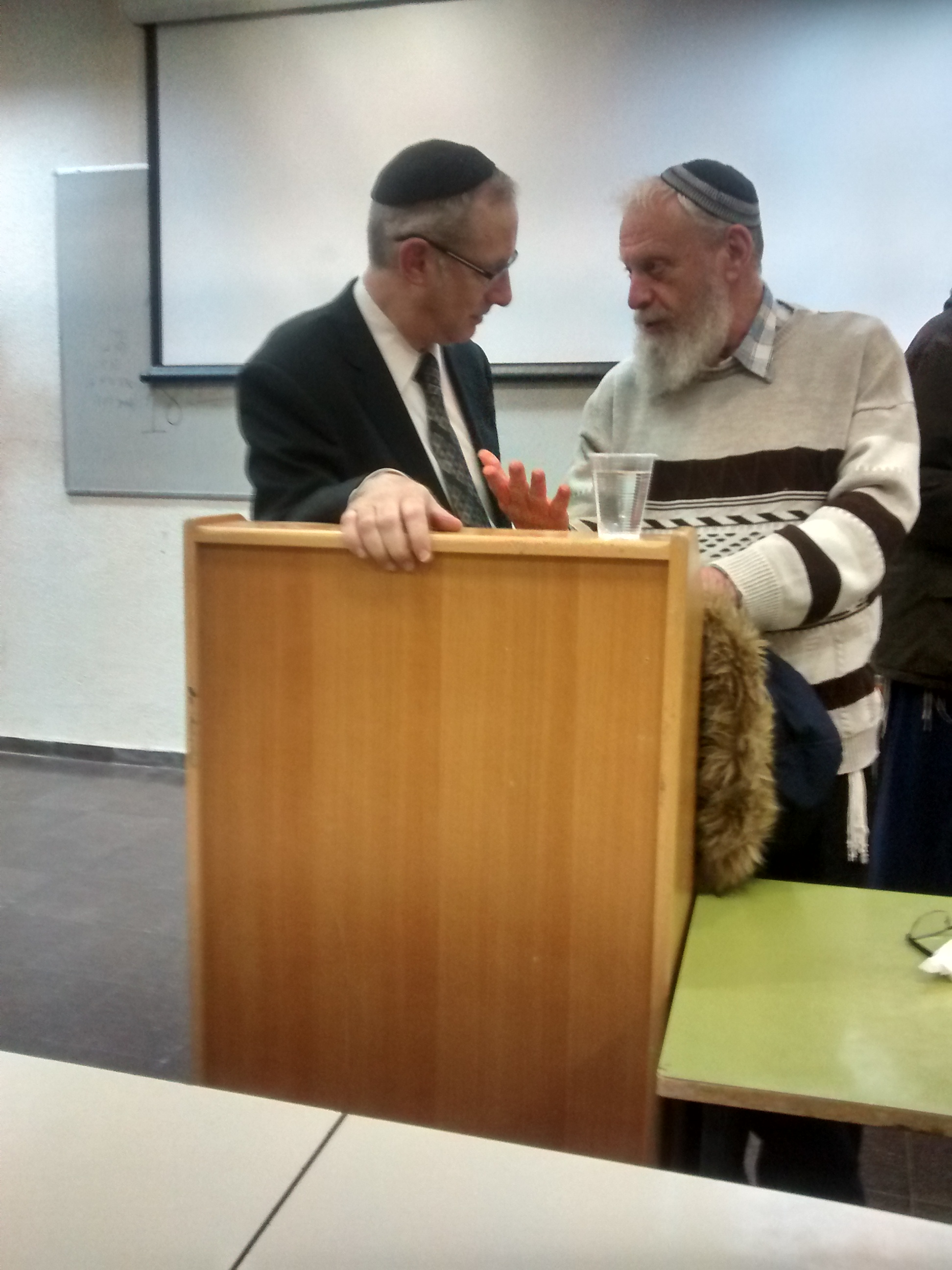
- Rabbi Dr. Yoel Bin-Nun (right) with Rabbi Dr. Michael Rosensweig (left)

Personal life
- Born: May 9, 1946 (age 80) Israel
- Spouse: Esther Bin-Nun
- Education: Mercaz HaRav
- Website: http://www.ybn.co.il; https://yoel-binnun.com

Religious life
- Religion: Judaism
- Denomination: Orthodox Judaism

Jewish leader
- Yeshiva: Yeshivat Har Etzion
- Organisation: Gush Emunim
- Residence: Alon Shevut

Yoel Bin-Nun (Hebrew: יואל בן נון; born May 9, 1946 CE; 8 Iyar 5766 AM) is an Israeli religious Zionist rabbi and one of the founders of Yeshivat Har Etzion, Gush Emunim, Michlelet Herzog and the settlements of Alon Shevut and Ofra. He is a scholar of Jewish thought, and a lecturer and expert on the Tanach.

== Biography ==
Bin-Nun was born in 1946 in Haifa to Yechiel Bin-Nun (Fischer) and Shoshana Bin-Nun (Rosa First), educators and researchers in Judaism and the Hebrew language. His brother, Elchanan Bin-Nun, is the rabbi of Shiloh and the past head of a Yeshiva in Beit Orot. Bin-Nun studied at the Kfar Haroeh yeshiva and, later, the Mercaz Harav Yeshiva, where he was close to Zvi Yehuda Kook. He received his Ph.D. from Hebrew University.

He fought in the Six Day War and was part of Israel's 55th Paratroopers Brigade that liberated Old City Jerusalem. He is one of the main characters featured in Yossi Klein HaLevi's Like Dreamers: The Story of the Israeli Paratroopers who Reunited Jerusalem and Divided A Nation. Following the war, he and Hanan Porat turned to Rabbi Yehuda Amital and together they established Yeshivat Har Etzion in Alon Shvut. Even then, at the age of 23, Bin-Nun taught at the yeshiva. At the same time, he taught at the Kfar Etzion Field School.

He also fought in the Yom Kippur War, his brigade being the one who crossed the Suez Canal, changing the tide of the war. After the war, Bin-Nun was one of the founders of Gush Emunim (which he would later break away from) as well as the settlements of Alon Shevut and Ofra. The founding meeting took place in 1974 at his home in Alon Shvut. For many years he was a member of the Gush secretariat. In 1976, he and his wife moved from Alon Shevut to Ofra. They eventually moved back to Alon Shevut, where they currently reside.

In 1985 he established an all-girls high-school in Ofra and headed it for about ten years. In 1986, he helped establish Michlelet Yaakov Herzog for training Jewish Studies teachers, especially in Bible instruction. In 1986, he co-founded Megadim, the Torah journal for Tanach, with the team of Bible studies at the Teachers' Training Institute in Har Etzion (now: Yaakov Herzog College). Rabbi Bin-Nun published many articles in the journal and elsewhere. He also taught training courses for instructors of the Society for the Protection of Nature. Between 2000 and 2006 he served as Rosh HaYeshiva of Yeshivat HaKibbutz HaDati (Ein Tzurim).

He and Hanan Porat emphasized the importance of studying the Tanach in yeshivas. Bin-Nun emphasized a deep understanding of Tanach and its connection to the Land of Israel. His teaching and activities at Yeshivat Har Etzion, at Herzog College and more contributed to the "Tanach (study) revolution" in Israel, especially in the Dati-Leumi public. He led a generation of religious Zionists back to the study of Tanach as a way to understand contemporary Israel. (See further re this approach under Yeshivat Har Etzion § Educational and religious philosophy.)

In 1996 he and Yaakov Shapira established the Midreshet Yaud, within the framework of the Amit network, for the training of teachers in the national service for teaching Judaism in secular schools. In 2008 his doctoral dissertation was approved at the Hebrew University on the subject of "the dual source of inspiration and authority in the teaching of Rabbi Kook." In 2018 he was awarded the Rav Zvi Yehudah HaKohen Torah Creation Prize (Hebrew: פרס היצירה התורנית ע"ש הרצי"ה). In October 2019, Tishrei 5780, he was awarded the Minister of Education's Award for Jewish Culture for Lifetime Achievement.

As of 2015, Bin-Nun has a daily column as part of Project 929: Tanach B'yachad. He also has a website containing many of his shiurim.

== Philosophy ==
A significant part of Bin-Nun's thinking revolves around Tanach and its study. Following Yehuda Elitzur, he strives to draw contemporary meanings from the Bible and to explain the text according to its simple meaning (Pshat). He was one of the prominent voices in the "תנ״ך בגובה העיניים" ("Tanach at Eye Level") debate, in which he criticized the approach of the rabbis of the Har Hamor yeshiva. Bin-Nun believed that it is important to see the nuances, complexity and even faults of the heroes of the Bible and as having a humanity that is not fundamentally different from those learning the text. According to him, only in this way can value and moral meaning truly be drawn from the stories of the Avot (patriarchs).

Bin-Nun also deals with the midrashim of Chazal, focusing on the principled controversy between the midrashim of Rabbi Akiva and Rabbi Ishmael, as well as an original interpretation of Rav Kook's teachings.

Similarly to his Rabbi, Rav Zvi Yehuda Kook, and Kook's father, Rav Abraham Isaac Kook, Bin-Nun strongly promotes the value of Achdut Yisrael, unity among the Jewish people. Bin-Nun believes that only through Achdut will the Jewish people thrive and that the Geulah (redemption) itself is a process that is a function of the Ahavat Chinam and Achdut in Am Yisrael.

== Political activity ==
Bin-Nun was one of the drafters of the Kinneret Charter, which seeks to create a common denominator between the various segments in the Jewish public.

Bin-Nun was very close with Prime Minister Yitzchak Rabin, corresponding with him frequently. Bin-Nun became much more well known after Rabin's assassination in November 1995, when he attacked the atmosphere in the Dati-Leumi public before the assassination, saying that he had information about rabbis who ruled that Rabin fell under "Din Rodef" (an active murderer) thereby legitimizing his murder (see: Assassination of Yitzhak Rabin). He did not provide details or evidence and his remarks were perceived by many in the religious Zionist public as illegitimate. At this point, he broke with the settlement movement and moved from Ofra back to Alon Shevut.

In Nissan 5772 (2002) he wrote at the point, on the occasion of the twentieth anniversary of the evacuation of Yamit (translated from Hebrew):

"... There was no chance in front of a national government. We had to reach an agreement between Jews and Jews. Between the right-wing parties and the public behind them and the Jewish left. The unity that was created as a result would change the picture ... We are clearly in a similar situation today. A right-wing leader stands as Prime Minister today, and he is the one who may lead us to the same trouble ... What we had to do then, we must do today: sit down for negotiations between Jews. An agreement between the settlers of Yesha, in all their political shades, and between the Jewish left ... There was no unity, and we did not gain the liberation of the land. In the Six Days [War] there was unity, and indeed we did gain liberation. Since the Lebanon War we have been deeply divided, and here the land is taken from us. The land does not stand on its own, it is a function of the people of Israel."

Bin-Nun did a lot of interviewing during the period surrounding the disengagement plan. About a month after the demolition of the permanent buildings in Amona, in a newspaper called HaTzopheh he published a scathing article titled "The New Satmar Community" in which he attacked the conduct of the religious Zionist community during and after the disengagement. He wrote that the approach of the sharp and violent resistance was only damaging, and emphasized that although democracy allows for "civil disobedience" it is precisely the Torah that forbids it. He signed his article with the line:

"Our flag is blue-and-white without any orange. Blue-and-white has its root in holiness, in the Tzitzit. Orange is the law of the Gentiles. I am not orange, nor stripe, nor stain and speck. Only blue-and-white and the unity of Israel."

On March 5, 2006, about three weeks before the elections to the 17th Knesset, Bin-Nun announced his support for the Kadima party, saying that "it seems, in the coming years all significant decisions will be made there. To save as much of the settlement movement as possible [it] must be there." He argued that the constant struggle of the settlement leaders over "everything" often caused them to be left with nothing. However, he refrained from calling on people to vote for the party.

On the events of the Beit HaShalom in Hebron, he wrote: "If the Jewish Hebron does not connect all the people of Israel to it, it may be destroyed. The key is in the hands of the people of Hebron themselves. If they act like David, they will connect the people of Israel to them. If they act like Avshalom, in violent bullying, they will even succeed here and there, the people of Israel will vomit them, and God will turn a blind eye to them, Chas v'Shalom. The promise of God hidden in Hebron is eternal, and precisely because of this it can be preserved for a worthy generation. There is no special promise for this generation, or for another specific generation."

In the run-up to the elections to the Eighteenth Knesset, he announced his support for the Jewish Home Party.

In his opinion, the Makom Hamikdash on the Temple Mount should be off-limits to people of all religions, until the people of Israel reach the level required for the construction of the Temple.

== Notable students ==
- Yaakov Medan
- Menachem Leibtag
- Nathaniel Helfgot
- Yonatan Grossman
- Tamir Granot
- Yitzchak Blau

== Published works ==
- Isaiah: Prophet of Righteousness and Justice (2019)
- Zachor Veshamor
- Ani Kohelet
