= Yael Ziegler =

American–Israeli Modern Orthodox author and scholar

Dr. Yael Ziegler
- יעל ציגלר

Personal life
- Born: 1970 (age 55–56)
- Spouse: Reuven Ziegler
- Education: Yeshiva University, Bar-Ilan University

Religious life
- Religion: Judaism
- Denomination: Modern Orthodoxy, Religious Zionism
- Organisation: Matan Women's Institute for Torah Studies, Herzog College
- Residence: Alon Shevut

Yael Ziegler (Hebrew: יעל ציגלר; born 1970) is an American–Israeli Modern Orthodox author, Tanakh scholar, and educator. She is Rosh Beit Midrash at Matan Women's Institute for Torah Studies and a lecturer in Tanakh at Herzog College. She specializes in literary and theological interpretations of biblical texts and is widely known for her contributions to the field of biblical interpretation.

== Biography ==
Ziegler was born in 1970 in America. Following high school, she attended Yeshiva University's Stern College for Women in Manhattan. During this time her studies focused more on Torah Shebe’al Peh (Jewish oral law) than Tanakh. She then went on to study at Bar-Ilan University in Ramat Gan, Israel, where she obtained an M.A. and Ph.D. in Bible studies. It was during this time that she became more interested in Tanakh, during what she describes as, "the beginning of a significant shift from an emphasis on Bible criticism to an emphasis on using literary tools for analysis."

Ziegler is a member of the "Tanakh b'govah ha'einayim" (Tanakh at eye-level) school of thought, predominantly modeled by the scholars of Yeshivat Har Etzion and Herzog College, which integrates traditional Jewish exegesis with modern academic methodologies. Ziegler refers to this mode of analysis as “literary-theological readings,” a term coined by Rabbi Shalom Carmy. She is widely known for her works discussing Tanakh, such as, Ruth: From Alienation to Monarchy and Lamentations: Faith in a Turbulent World.

Ziegler's primary influences were Bryna Levy, Rabbi Dr. Mordechai Sabato, and Rabbi Yaakov Medan. In particular, she says that her book on Ruth employs a methodology which follows that of Sabato, and her approach to Midrash has been revolutionized by the perspective of Medan, that of "omek peshuto shel mikra" – seeing Midrash as pointing towards a deeper peshat.

== Works ==
- Promises to Keep: The Oath in Biblical Narrative (2008)
- Ruth: From Alienation to Monarchy (2015)
- Lamentations: Faith in a Turbulent World (2021)

== Personal ==
Ziegler and her husband, Rabbi Reuven Ziegler, reside in Alon Shevut. They have five children.
