= Shalom Berger =

Jewish scholar

Rabbi Dr. Shalom Z. Berger
- שלום ברגר
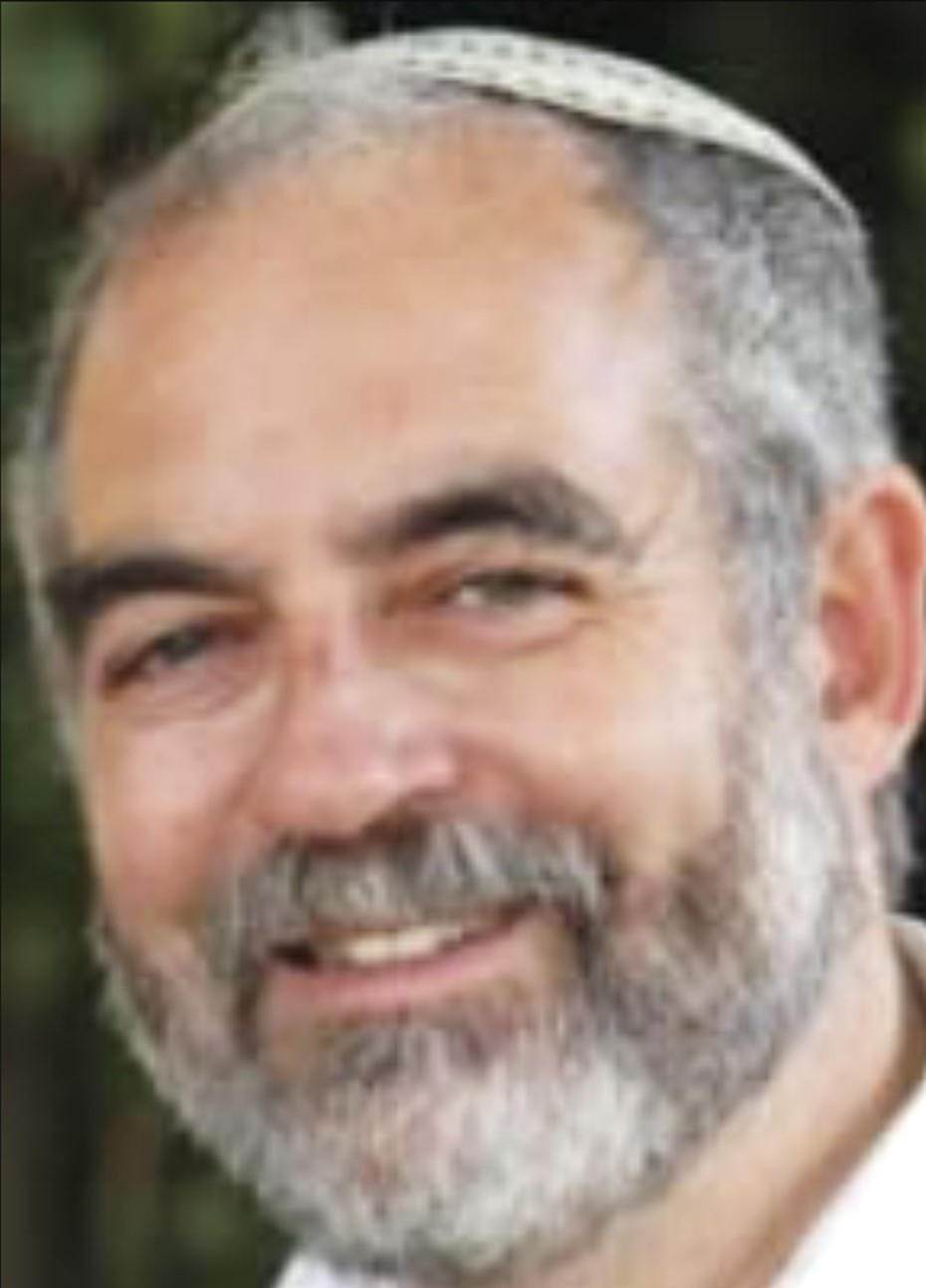

Personal life
- Born: United States
- Notable work(s): Senior Content Editor of the Koren/Steinsaltz English Talmud, Founding Editor of Jewish Educational Leadership
- Education: Yeshiva University, Baruch College
- Occupation: Scholar, Educational Activist

Religious life
- Religion: Judaism
- Denomination: Orthodox

Shalom Berger (Hebrew: שלום ברגר) is an Orthodox Jewish scholar and educational activist.

Berger was born and raised in the United States. He studied in Yeshiva Chaim Berlin high school in Brooklyn under Yitzchak Hutner, in Yeshivat Har Etzion in Israel under Aharon Lichtenstein and Yehuda Amital and in Yeshiva University. He earned Semicha (rabbinic ordination), a BA in mathematics and an MS and EdD in education at Yeshiva University, and an MPA in Public Administration from Baruch College.

Prior to moving to Israel in 1991, Berger taught in the Frisch School and later in HAFTR High School, where he served as director of Israel Guidance. In Israel he taught in BMT and Midreshet Lindenbaum. In 1998 he began working at the Lookstein Center for Jewish Education, part of the School of Education at Bar-Ilan University. In recent years he has written for the Aleph Society/Steinsaltz Center, where he was the senior content editor of the Koren/Steinsaltz English Talmud. He heads the English-language programming for Herzog College at its Jerusalem, Alon Shvut and Migdal Oz campuses. He also serves on the Zomet Institute's Rabbinical Conversion Court in Alon Shvut.

== The Lookstein Center ==
=== Lookjed ===
In 1998, while working at BMT and Midreshet Lindenbaum in Jerusalem, Berger responded to the internet revolution which was still in an embryonic stage, by starting a mailing list whose objective was to create an on-line community of practice for Jewish educators around the globe to collaborate with each other on issues of urgency to the world of Jewish education, and to develop curricula and methodology together. The Lookstein Center for Jewish Education]\, part of the School of Education at Bar-Ilan University agreed to host the listserv, which was given the name "Lookjed" (based on the name "Lookstein" and "Jewish Education", but at the time the listserv host names were limited to seven characters). Lookjed is, to this day, a resource of information and support for Jewish educators world wide.

=== Jewish Educational Leadership ===
Berger is the founding editor of the Lookstein Center's professional journal,Jewish Educational Leadership. The journal is designed to increase the exposure of Jewish educators to general research and advances in education and focus on the applicability of these findings to the world of Jewish education.

== One year Israel programs ==
Berger's doctoral dissertation focuses on the effects of the gap-year spent by many young American high school graduates in study programs throughout Israel. As the year-in-Israel programs have expanded and developed into an almost structured part of the American Orthodox Jewish educational experience, questions have been raised about the impact of those programs on the American Jewish community writ large. Berger's research found that the overwhelming majority of students return to North America and continue with their college plans. The research was published in popular form as part of the book Flipping Out.

== Steinsaltz Aleph Society scholarship ==
Berger created a full cycle of daf yomi essays based on Adin Steinsaltz's commentary on the Talmud. He served as the Steinsaltz scholar, assembling and developing curricular materials that have been used in the Aleph society's Talmud Circle, as well as the senior content editor for the Koren/Steinsaltz English Talmud.

== Summer camp ==
Berger has served as Camp Rabbi at Camp Moshava (IO) for many years, and has publicly called for greater recognition and support for Jewish summer camps as part of the Jewish educational system.

== Poland heritage trips ==
Berger leads groups of college-age students on Jewish heritage trips in Eastern Europe and is an advocate of such programs as part of a broad Jewish educational experience. He has discussed the impact of these trips in educational forums]and articles.
