= Assaf Bednarsh =

Modern Orthodox rabbi

Assaf Bednarsh אסף בדנרש
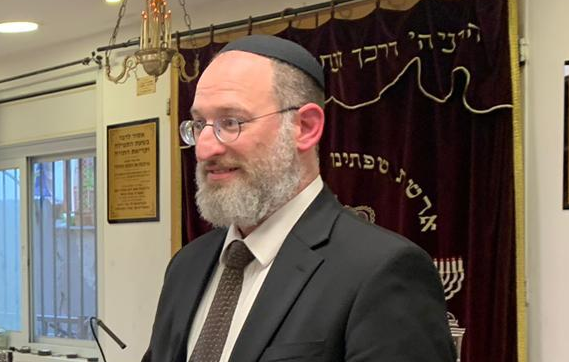

Personal life
- Born: 1971 (age 54–55) Kfar Etzion, Israel
- Education: Marsha Stern Talmudical Academy, Yeshivat Har Etzion, Princeton University, Yeshiva University

Religious life
- Religion: Judaism
- Denomination: Modern Orthodox
- Yeshiva: Rabbi Isaac Elchanan Theological Seminary
- Position: Rosh Yeshiva; Ruth Buchbinder Mitzner Chair in Talmud and Jewish Law
- Residence: Alon Shevut
- Semikhah: Rabbi Isaac Elchanan Theological Seminary

Assaf Bednarsh (Hebrew: אסף בדנרש; born December 29, 1971) is an American–Israeli Modern Orthodox rabbi and Rosh yeshiva of the Yeshiva University affiliated Rabbi Isaac Elchanan Theological Seminary. He is Sgan Rosh Kollel for the Gruss Kollel in Jerusalem, and he is the first Ruth Buchbinder Mitzner Chair in Talmud and Jewish law. He also teaches at Yeshivat Har Etzion in Alon Shevut.

== Biography ==
Bednarsh was born in Kfar Etzion, Israel in 1971, and moved to the United States with his parents 8 months later. He graduated from the Marsha Stern Talmudical Academy, the Yeshiva University High School for Boys, in 1989. He went on to learn at Yeshivat Har Etzion, then headed by Aharon Lichtenstein and Yehuda Amital. He holds a B.A. from Princeton University, from which he graduated in 1992, and an M.A. in Jewish history from Yeshiva University. Bednarsh received his Semichah from the Rabbi Isaac Elchanan Theological Seminary in 1997.

Bednarsh served as a Maggid Shiur and assistant director of Yeshiva University's Graduate Program for Women in Advanced Talmudic Studies, and as a Rebbe at TMSTA – Yeshiva University High School.

In 2004, Bednarsh moved to Israel with his family on Aliyah from New York City, leaving his positions at Yeshiva University to take on new positions in Israel.

On April 14, 2007, he was invested as the first Ruth Buchbinder Mitzner Chair of Talmud and Jewish Law of the Gruss Kollel in Jerusalem. Bednarsh also serves as Rosh yeshiva for YU and teaches at Yeshivat Har Etzion.

== Personal ==
Bednarsh is married to Leora Bednarsh, a graduate of Drisha’s Scholars’ Circle, Yoetzet Halacha.

The Bednarsh family resides in Alon Shevut, where Yeshivat Har Etzion is located. They have seven children.
