= Sharon Shalom =

Jewish writer (born 1973)

Sharon Zaude Shalom
- שרון שלום
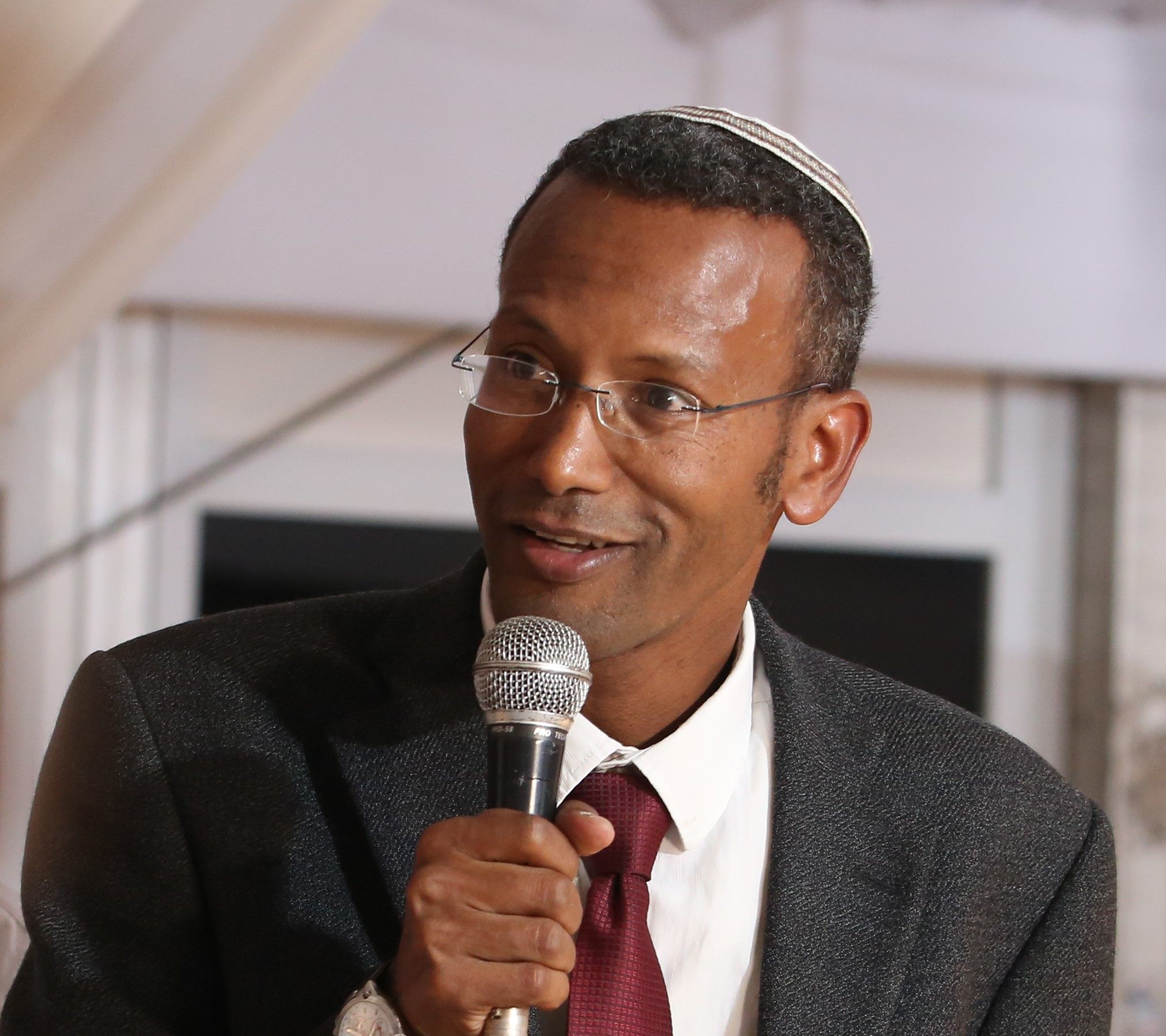
- Sharon Shalom in 2014
- Title: Rabbi Dr.

Personal life
- Born: Zaude Tesfay Ethiopia
- Spouse: Avital
- Children: Roi, Nadav, Ziv, Gil, and Tohar
- Education: Yeshivat Har Etzion, Bar Ilan University

Religious life
- Religion: Judaism
- Denomination: Orthodox Judaism

Jewish leader
- Position: Communal rabbi
- Synagogue: Kedoshei Yisrael
- Main work: Writer, educator
- Residence: Kiryat Gat, Israel

Sharon (Zewde) Shalom (Hebrew: שרון שלום; born 1973) is an Israeli rabbi, lecturer and Jewish author. He is a rav of one of the Tzohar "open communities" in Kiryat Gat. He was born Zaude Tesfay in a Jewish community in the North of Ethiopia. He works as a rabbi in the Merkaz Shapira Or Meofir special program for Ethiopian emigrants. He lectures in Jewish ritual and tradition at Ono Academic College in Israel, and wrote From Sinai to Ethiopia: the Halachic World and Ethiopian Jewish Thought.

== Early life ==
Sharon Shalom was born in 1973 in Ethiopia and grew up in a small Jewish village located in the North of Ethiopia. Twenty Jewish families lived together separately from the Christian population surrounding them.

He listened to his grandfather that God would one day rejoin Jews around the world. This biblical promise led him and a friend to leave the village to set off for Jerusalem at age seven. They got lost and returned home.

=== Jerusalem ===
When the Ethiopian Civil War erupted he found another opportunity to move to Jerusalem. Israel's parliament passed a law committing Israel to take in Jews of Ethiopia.

When he was eight his mother sent him to join a group of Jewish refugees leaving for Israel.

One year after arriving in Israel, Shalom was misinformed that his family had died in Ethiopia. Two years later, his parents arrived in Israel.

== Career ==
Shalom served as an officer in the Israel Defense Forces. After that he enrolled at Yeshivat Har Etzion where he was a student of the roshei yeshiva, rabbis Aharon Lichtenstein and Yehuda Amital and the rosh kollel Shlomo Levy. He was ordained as a rabbi in 2001. At Bar-Ilan University he completed a doctorate in Jewish philosophy.

In 2012, he published From Sinai to Ethiopia: The Halachic World and Ethiopian Jewish Thought. He has called to stop racism against Ethiopian Jews in Israel.

He is also the author of Dialogues of Love and Fear, published in 2021.

== Personal life ==
Shalom is married to Avital, a Swiss-born social worker and art therapist. They live in the southern Israeli city of Kiryat Gat with their five children, Roi, Nadav, Ziv, Gil, and Tohar.
