= Reuven Ziegler =

American–Israeli Modern Orthodox rabbi

Rabbi Reuven Ziegler ראובן ציגלר
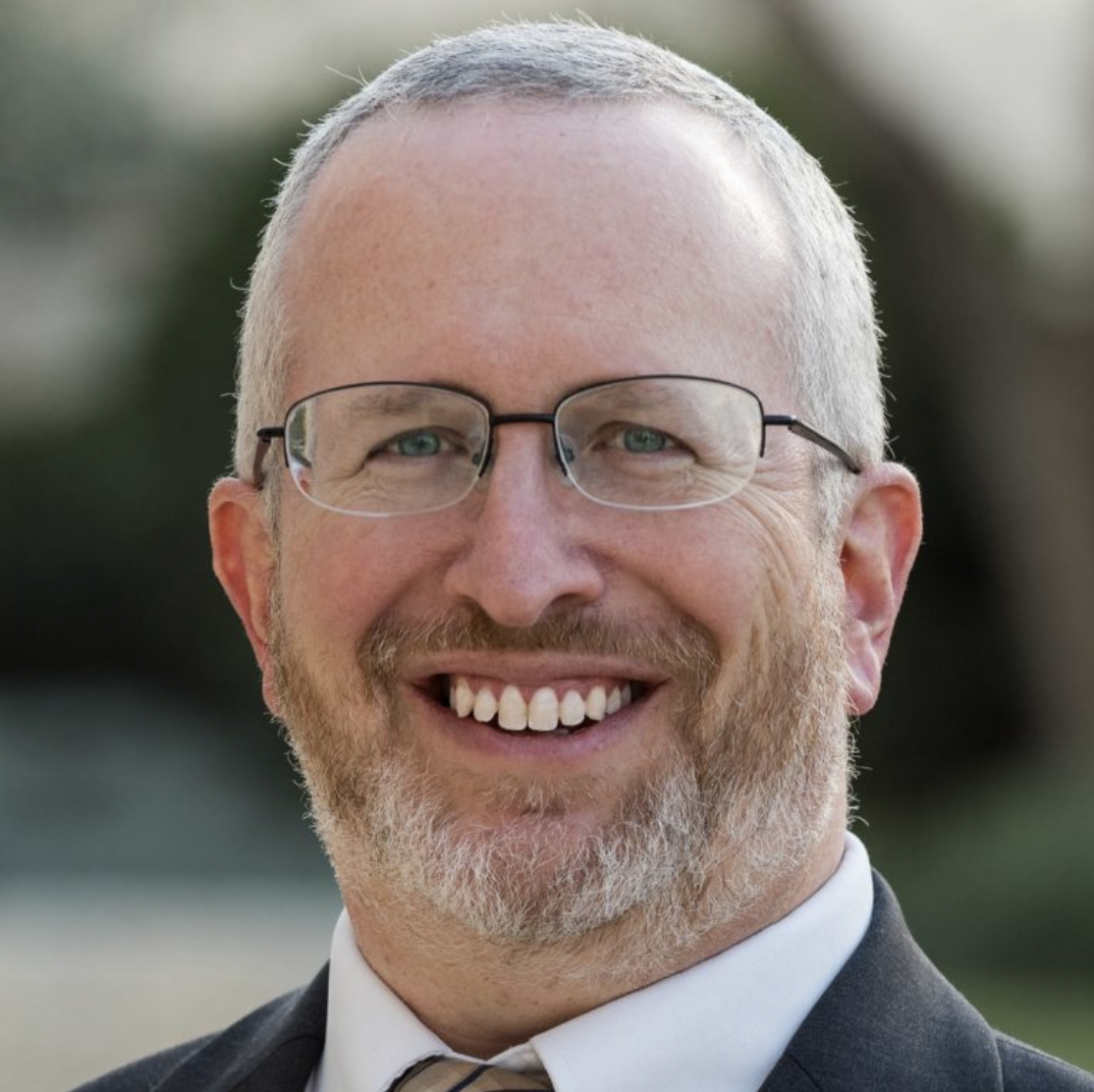

Personal life
- Born: 1968 (age 57–58)
- Spouse: Yael Ziegler
- Education: Yeshivat Har Etzion, Yeshiva University

Religious life
- Religion: Judaism
- Denomination: Modern Orthodoxy, Religious Zionism
- Organisation: Koren Publishers Jerusalem, Israel Koschitzky Virtual Beit Midrash, Toras HoRav Foundation
- Residence: Alon Shevut
- Semikhah: Rabbi Isaac Elchanan Theological Seminary

Reuven Ziegler (Hebrew: ראובן ציגלר; born 1968) is an American–Israeli Modern Orthodox rabbi, author, editor and lecturer. He is Chairman of the Editorial board at Koren Publishers Jerusalem, as well as director of research at the Toras HoRav Foundation. He is also Founder and Editor-in-Chief of the Israel Koschitzky Virtual Beit Midrash of Yeshivat Har Etzion. He is also an expert on the life and thought of Rabbi Joseph B. Soloveitchik.

== Biography ==
Ziegler was born in 1968 in America. In 1986, he attended Yeshivat Har Etzion where he studied under the tutelage of Rav Aharon Lichtenstein and Rav Yehuda Amital. Ziegler received semikhah from the Rabbi Isaac Elchanan Theological Seminary of Yeshiva University.

Ziegler has served as Editor-in-Chief of the Israel Koschitzky Virtual Beit Midrash since its inception in 1994.

Ziegler was first exposed to the thought and writings of Soloveitchik while in high school. He has since then worked for years analyzing the hundreds of manuscripts left by Soloveitchik after his death, and through these he helped produce MeOtzar HaRav and various works of Soloveitchik in both Hebrew and English.

== Works ==
Ziegler is the author of Majesty and Humility: The Thought of Rabbi Joseph B. Soloveitchik. It is also published in Hebrew as עוז וענווה: הגותו של הרב" יוסף דוב סולוביצ’יק." The book attempts to convey and analyze the thought of the Rav. "By skillfully drawing connections between various writings, by clarifying many challenging ideas and passages, and by integrating the Ravs life with his thought, Rabbi Ziegler presents fresh, penetrating perspectives and insights that will enlighten even seasoned readers. The author makes demanding philosophical works exciting and accessible."

He has worked on many of the books produced by the Toras HoRav Foundation, which "was established by family members and former students to disseminate [the works and thought of Rabbi Joseph B. Soloveitchik], with the aims of enhancing both our grasp of Rabbi Soloveitchik's philosophy and our understanding of the diverse topics he addresses."

He is also the editor of an adaptation of Aharon Lichtenstein’s oral discourses entitled By His Light: Character and Values in the Service of God (2003), a work on the teachings of Rav Yehuda Amital entitled LeOvdekha BeEmet (2011) and My Constant Delight – Contemporary Religious Zionist Perspectives on Tanakh Study (in Hebrew היא שיחתי: על דרך לימוד התנ״ך).

== Personal ==
Ziegler and his wife, Dr. Yael Ziegler, reside in Alon Shevut. They have five children.
