= Megadim (journal) =

- Discipline: Hebrew Bible
- Language: Hebrew

Publication details
- History: 1986-present
- Publisher: Herzog College (Israel)

Standard abbreviations
- ISO 4: Megadim

Indexing
- ISSN: 0334-8814
- OCLC no.: 17535291

Megadim (Hebrew: מגדים) is a Hebrew language journal about the Hebrew Bible. It is published by the Herzog College, an affiliate of Yeshivat Har Etzion, two or three times a year. Along with Beit Mikra, it is one of the few journals that deal almost exclusively with analysis of the Tanakh.

Megadim was first published around 1986. More than 60 volumes were published by 2024. Writers and editors for Megadim include Dr. Yosef Ofer and Dr. Mordechai Sabato of Bar-Ilan University, Dr. Shmuel Wygoda (a student of Emmanuel Levinas), Rabbi Dr. Yoel Bin-Nun, Rabbi Yaakov Medan, Prof. Yoel Elitzur of Hebrew University, and other notable members of the religious Zionism movement. The writers for Megadim include analysts of the Bible, lecturers at colleges, and advanced students, especially from Yeshivat Har Etzion and Herzog College.

The guiding principle of Megadim is to maintain the balance between an academic standard on the one hand, and adherence to the faith of its intelligent religious Jewish audience on the other hand. Therefore, the most popular topics among the articles are literary analyses of the Bible and of Jewish commentators, which enable the adoption of scholarly approaches without needing to deal with loaded issues such as the Documentary Hypothesis or the origins of Christianity.

The articles in Megadim are strictly peer-reviewed before publication in order to maintain high standards. One of the weaknesses of the journal is an insufficient reliance on sources written in languages other than Hebrew. Recently, the journal has also started publishing English articles.
