= Yitzchak Blau =

American-Israeli rabbi

Yitzchak Blau יצחק בלאו

Personal life
- Children: 4
- Parents: Yosef Blau (father); Rivkah Teitz (mother)
- Education: Yeshivat Har Etzion, Yeshiva University

Religious life
- Religion: Judaism
- Denomination: Modern Orthodox

Jewish leader
- Position: Rosh Yeshiva
- Yeshiva: Yeshivat Orayta
- Residence: Alon Shevut
- Semikhah: Rabbi Isaac Elchanan Theological Seminary

Yitzchak Blau (Hebrew: יצחק בלאו) is an American–Israeli Modern Orthodox rabbi and rosh yeshiva of Yeshivat Orayta in Jerusalem. He is a contributor to and associate editor of Tradition, an Orthodox Jewish peer-reviewed academic journal. He also teaches at Midreshet Lindenbaum in Jerusalem. Blau is the son of Rabbi Yosef Blau, senior mashgiach ruchani at Yeshiva University, and grandson of Rabbi Pinchas Mordechai Teitz.

== Biography ==
Blau, born in 1968 to Yosef and Rivkah Blau, is a descendant of Mordecai Yoffe, known as the Levush (לבוש). He grew up in Washington Heights.

After high school, Blau studied at Yeshivat Har Etzion in Alon Shvut under Aharon Lichtenstein and Yehuda Amital. He then attended Yeshiva University, where he received a Bachelor of Arts in English literature. He has a master's degree in medieval Jewish history from the Bernard Revel Graduate School of Jewish Studies and semikhah from Rabbi Isaac Elchanan Theological Seminary.

Blau taught at the Yeshivah of Flatbush High School for four years prior to making Aliyah. After moving to Israel, he taught at Yeshivat HaMivtar for eleven years. He also served as the rosh kollel of Yeshivat Shvilei Hatorah.

Blau serves as rosh yeshiva at Yeshivat Orayta, which was established in 2008. He also teaches at Midreshet Lindenbaum.

On January 1, 2009, Blau published a book entitled Fresh Fruit & Vintage Wine: Ethics and Wisdom of the Aggada through KTAV Publishing House. The book focuses on aggadic portions of the Talmud, attempting to present a perspective integrating the halakhic and aggadic portions of the text to arrive at novel insights.

Blau has published over thirty articles in various areas of Jewish studies. He has also published over 200 Torah-related articles through the Virtual Beit Midrash of Yeshivat Har Etzion. Blau is associate editor for Tradition, and he has published articles in The Commentator.

== Personal ==
Blau is married to Noa Jeselsohn. The Blaus reside in Alon Shevut and have four children.
