= Baruch Gigi =

Rav Baruch Gigi
- ברוך גיגי
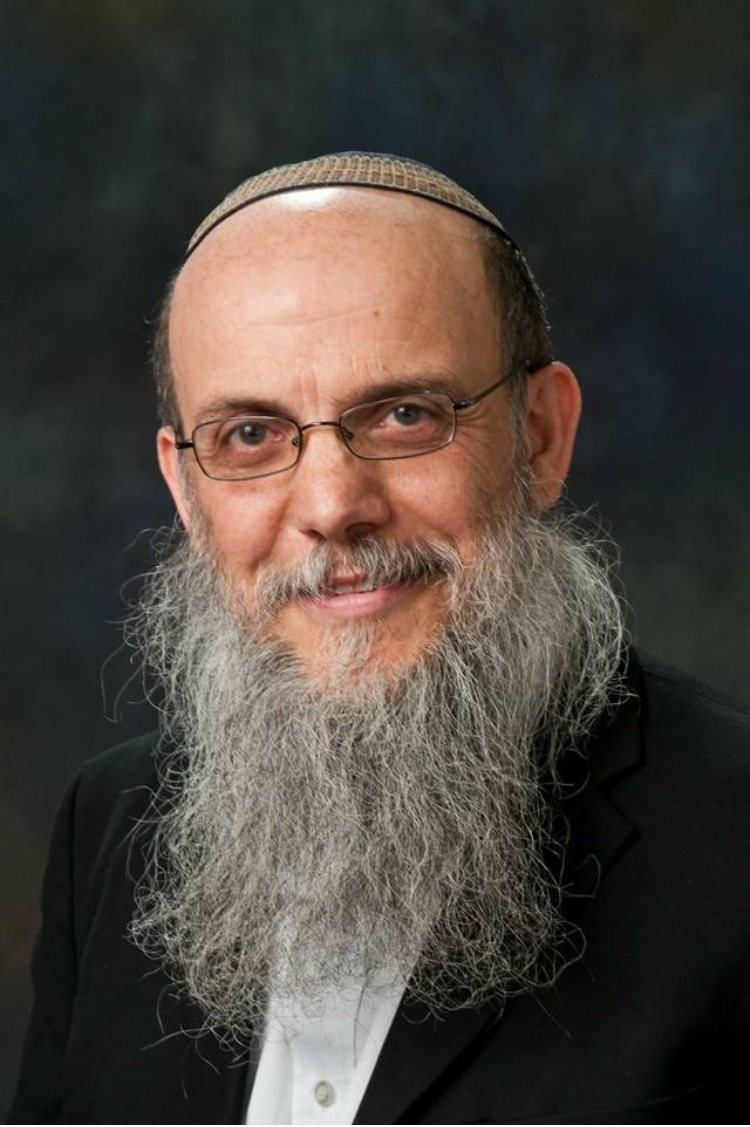
- Official picture of Rav Baruch Gigi

Co-Rosh Yeshiva of Yeshivat Har Etzion

Rabbi of the Sephardi synagogue in Alon Shvut

Teacher at Midreshet Lindenbaum and Migdal Oz

Personal life
- Born: Meknes, Morocco
- Education: Herzog College, Bachelor of Education (BEd); Yeshivat Har Etzion
- Occupation: Co-Rosh Yeshiva of Yeshivat Har Etzion

Religious life
- Religion: Judaism

Baruch Gigi (Hebrew: ברוך גיגי) is a co-Rosh yeshiva of Yeshivat Har Etzion in Gush Etzion.

== Biography ==
Baruch Gigi was born in Morocco and immigrated to Israel at the age of 11. He first attended Yeshivat Har Etzion as a student in 1974 after studying in a yeshiva high school in Haifa. He was ordained by the Chief Rabbinate of Israel and received a BEd degree from Herzog College. From 1982 to 1988, he taught in Yeshivat Ma'alot in the town of Ma'alot-Tarshiha and since then has been teaching in Yeshivat Har Etzion.

Together with Rabbi Yaaqov Medan, Gigi joined Rabbi Yehuda Amital and Rabbi Aharon Lichtenstein as a co-Rosh Yeshiva on January 4, 2006.

He also serves as the rabbi of the Sephardi synagogue in Alon Shvut (the town where the yeshiva is located), and he teaches several classes in the women's institutions Midreshet Lindenbaum and Migdal Oz.
