= Nathaniel Helfgot =

American rabbi (born 1963)

Rabbi Nathaniel Helfgot

Personal life
- Spouse: Rachel Brenner
- Children: 4
- Education: Yeshivat Har Etzion

Religious life
- Religion: Judaism
- Synagogue: Congregation Netivot Shalom
- Position: Rabbi
- Semikhah: Rabbi Isaac Elchanan Theological Seminary

Nathaniel Helfgot (born December, 1963) is an American rabbi. He leads Congregation Netivot Shalom of Teaneck, New Jersey, and has served as president of the International Rabbinic Fellowship.

== Early life ==
Helfgot studied at Yeshivat Har Etzion for two years and later attended Yeshiva University, the Azrieli Graduate School, and the Rabbi Isaac Elchanan Theological Seminary, where he obtained his semikhah (rabbinical ordination).

== Career ==
Helfgot is the rabbi of Congregation Netivot Shalom, an Orthodox congregation in Teaneck, New Jersey. He served as president of the International Rabbinic Fellowship.

Helfgot has taught at the Drisha Institute for Jewish Education, the Frisch School, the Ma'ayanot Yeshiva High School, and the Torah Academy of Bergen County, currently teaching at Yeshivat Chovevei Torah and SAR High School, where he is also a department chair. He has served or continues to serve on the steering committee of the Orthodox Forum, as the plenum of the Orthodox Caucus, and on the board of the Association of Modern Orthodox Day Schools.

Helfgot has published articles in various journals such as Tradition, Tehumin, Jewish Action, Ten-Daat, Beit Yitzchak, Megadim, Alon Shvut, Or HaMizrach, The Orthodox Forum Series, The Jewish Week, The Jewish Standard, and Hamevaser.

In July 2010, as a response to the December 2009 panel held at Yeshiva University under the title "Being Gay in the Modern Orthodox World", Helfgot published an online "Statement of Principles on the Place of Jews with a Homosexual Orientation in Our Community" which garnered hundreds of signatures.

In February 2019, a three quarters majority of the Rabbinical Council of Bergen County's (RCBC) board voted, after meeting twice, to amend its bylaws in order to remove Helfgot and Netivot Shalom from its affiliation over his hiring of a female rabbinic intern from Yeshivat Maharat. Helfgot, who was present at both meetings and addressed the council, issued a statement both praising the RCBC as an institution and expressing his "disagreement and disappointment" with its decision. The RCBC and Helfgot have since come to an agreement, with him and his synagogue remaining members in good standing with the organization.

== Personal life ==
Helfgot is married to Rachel Brenner. They have four children.

== Published works ==
- Helfgot, Nathaniel (2012). Mikra and Meaning: Studies in Bible and its Interpretation (1st ed.). Jerusalem: Maggid Books. ISBN 9781613290019. OCLC 779489142.
- Helfgot, Nathaniel. Divrei Berakah U’Moed: Halakhic Essays on the Topics of Holidays and Blessings. Yeshivat Har Etzion.
- Community, Covenant, and Commitment: Selected Letters and Communications of Rabbi Joseph B. Soloveitchik (ISBN 9780881258721). Toras HaRav Foundation.
- The YCT Companion to the Book of Samuel
