= Yeshivat Har Etzion =

Hesder Yeshiva located in the West Bank

Coordinates: 31.6577°N 35.1233°E

- ישיבת הר עציון
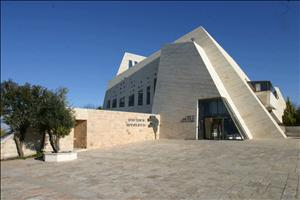
- Yeshivat Har Etzion's main Bet Midrash building
- Established: November 24, 1968, 3 Kislev 5729
- Founders: Yehuda Amital, Aharon Lichtenstein, Hanan Porat, Yoel Bin-Nun, Moshe Moskowitz
- Religious affiliation: Religious Zionism / Modern Orthodoxy
- Rosh Yeshiva: Mosheh Lichtenstein, Yaaqov Medan, Baruch Gigi
- Students: 480
- Location: HaYeshiva St 1, Alon Shvut, West Bank
- Website: haretzion.org

Yeshivat Har Etzion (YHE; Hebrew: ישיבת הר עציון), commonly known in English as "Gush" is a Hesder yeshiva located in Alon Shvut, an Israeli settlement in the West Bank. It is considered one of the leading institutions of advanced Torah study in the world and with a student body of roughly 480, it is the second largest hesder yeshiva in Israel.

== History ==
In 1968, shortly after the Six-Day War, a movement was founded to resettle the Gush Etzion region, from which Jews had been expelled following the Kfar Etzion massacre. Yehuda Amital, a prominent rabbi and Jewish educator, was asked to head a yeshiva in the region. In 1971, Rabbi Aharon Lichtenstein moved from the United States to join Amital as rosh yeshiva. First established in Kfar Etzion, it moved to Alon Shvut, where it developed into a major institution. The current yeshiva building was finished in 1977.

In 1997 a women's beit midrash was established for Israeli and overseas students as a sister school in Kibbutz Migdal Oz, which goes by the name Migdal Oz.

On January 4, 2006, Rabbis Yaakov Medan and Baruch Gigi joined Amital and Lichtenstein as rashei yeshiva in anticipation of Amital's upcoming retirement. Amital's involvement in the yeshiva effectively ended due to illness in the later months of 2009, and he died in July 2010. Mosheh Lichtenstein, son of Aharon Lichtenstein, was appointed as rosh yeshiva alongside and to eventually replace his father in 2008; Aharon Lichtenstein died in April 2015. The current rashei yeshiva are Rav Yaakov Medan, Rav Baruch Gigi and Rav Mosheh Lichtenstein.

Most of the students are Israelis in the hesder program, which integrates intensive yeshiva study with at least 15 months of active service in the Israel Defense Forces, an idea developed by the founding Rosh yeshiva, Rav Yehuda Amital.

There is a post-high school overseas program which receives students from the United States, Canada, the United Kingdom and France. There is also a Southern Hemisphere program for students from South Africa, New Zealand and Australia under Bnei Akiva's MTA program. Yeshivat Darkaynu, a yeshiva program for students with special needs is housed on the YHE campus.

Several of the overseas students join the Israeli Hesder program and make aliyah. Most return to university outside of Israel. Some students eventually come back to the yeshiva to study for the rabbinate in the yeshiva's Semicha Program (Semicha given by the Israeli Rabbanut) and affiliated Herzog College.

Many alumni, both overseas and Israeli, have gone on to become rashei yeshiva or to take on other rabbinical positions in Israel and abroad. Over 550 alumni from overseas have made aliyah and a high percentage are involved in Jewish education. Others have gone on to prominent academic careers in fields such as science, law, medicine, engineering and mathematics.

In 2022 the Yeshiva opened a high school in Alon Shevut, Yeshivat Har Etzion Latze'irim headed by Rabbi Amichai Gordin, who left his position as a Ram in the Yeshiva to take on this position. The high school was established to promote excellence in Gemara learning already from the high school age.

== Educational and religious philosophy ==
Yeshivat Har Etzion advocates a combination of Torah study and a love of the Jewish people and the Land of Israel. It is known for a more moderate and open approach to the role of religion in the modern world; the Yeshiva's slogan is "Immersed in Torah – Engaged with the World." The yeshiva encourages serious study, creative thought, intellectual rigor, and a universal, humanistic outlook. The Yeshiva's core philosophy is illustrated by two key works by its founding Roshei Yeshiva: Jewish Values in a Changing World by Rav Amital (Hebrew: והארץ נתן לבני אדם) and By His Light: Character and Values in the Service of God by Rav Lichtenstein (Hebrew: באור פניך יהלכון).

The central focus of study is the Gemara or Talmud and the yeshiva is known in Israel and abroad for its rigorous standards of Talmud learning. The Yeshiva in parallel emphasizes Tanach (Bible), Mussar (ethics and character development), Machshava (Jewish Thought), and Halakha LeMaaseh (practical Jewish law), facilitating students development in these areas also.

The study of Gemara at the yeshiva "trains talmidim [students] to analyze, explore and evaluate differing opinions in the hope that they will grow to be discerning individuals [and] sophisticated thinkers..." In particular, the Yeshiva emphasizes the Brisker method of Talmud study, a method innovated by Rabbi Chaim Soloveitchik; see Yeshiva § Talmud study. Some have argued that the complexity with which the yeshiva's students regard both Jewish and global matters can be seen as a product of the Brisker methodology, emphasizing as it does the compounded and dichotomous nature of many issues and subjects. The yeshiva's relatively liberal and open worldview is also seen as a product of this Brisker approach, viewing the world as complex, a composite of many different dichotomous principles, whose inherent tension needs to be recognised.

The yeshiva actively encourages ethical and philosophical study - Mussar and Machshavah - both academically, and especially so as to cultivate the student's love of Torah study and religious commitment. Numerous formal shiurim are offered in these areas daily, and students are encouraged to also study these areas privately. However unlike a classic Mussar yeshiva, there is no formal Mussar seder (a study session set aside for learning moral-ethical texts).

The yeshiva is also well known for its pioneering and continuing role in the study of Tanach. From the yeshiva's conception it was desired that Tanach would have an important role, something uncommon for Yeshivot at the time, and the Yeshiva thus pioneered the "Bible Revolution", "מהפכת התנ״ך", a renaissance in the status of and approach to Tanach study in the Religious Zionist (and broader religious) public, led by Yaaqov Medan and Yoel Bin-Nun. This approach emphasises the literal meaning (peshat) of biblical verses, but also takes into account the overall structure of the relevant section, the context and any intertextual references. It includes a more psychological and literary approach to character and narrative analysis, often known as "תנ"ך בגובה העיניים" ("Tanach at Eye Level"), all the while incorporating the views and ideas of the Midrash and later Rabbinical commentaries. In the past, Rabbi Mordechai Breuer, the founder of the Shitat Habechinot ("The Aspects Approach"), also taught at the yeshiva.

Many of the yeshiva's teachers and alumni have published sefarim on Tanach. For example, the "Torah MiEtzion" series presents essays on the five books of the Torah from the rabbis of the yeshiva. The approach of the series is "centered on learning the 'simple meaning' of the text but also incorporating the disciplines of literary theory, geography, archeology and history in order to better understand the text." Together with Herzog College, the Yeshiva produces several formal publications in the field, including the Journal Megadim.

== Libraries ==
The Yeshiva operates two libraries. The Torah Library is the largest of any yeshiva in Israel, with over 90,000 volumes, as well as CDs, microfilms, rare Judaica and antique books, including the personal collection of Rav Yisachar Tamar collection and a four-hundred year-old collection from the Etz Chayim community of Amsterdam. The Pedagogic Resource Center of the Herzog College supplements the central Torah library, providing audio-visual material for teachers of Judaic studies in Israel and worldwide.

== Online platforms ==
The Israel Koschitzky Virtual Beit Midrash provides yeshiva-style courses and shiurim (lectures) in Torah and Judaism to students of all ages online. Over 18,000 subscribers around the world subscribe to weekly shiurim, in English, Hebrew, and Russian covering subjects such as Tanakh, Gemara, Halakha, Jewish philosophy, and various other Jewish topics.

On June 23, 2025, the website of Yeshivat Har Etzion was hacked—apparently by Iranian cyber actors. The hackers replaced the content of the yeshiva's online Torah lessons with a threatening message in English: "You start the war, but we will end it!"

The cyberattack occurred during the eleventh day of Operation "Rising Lion," amid ongoing hostilities between Israel and Iran. In response, the yeshiva issued a lighthearted and defiant statement: "We’re pleased to see that the Torah of the yeshiva continues to break through (and be broken into) new frontiers. Welcome to our new followers from Iran who left their mark. You’re invited to join the battle of Torah and access our content on YouTube and Spotify."

The incident drew attention on Israeli news platforms and social media, with some commenters praising the yeshiva’s composed and humorous reaction to the breach.

KMTT is a daily Torah study Podcast from Yeshivat Har Etzion which is sent out every day of the week.

== Notable faculty ==
- Yehuda Amital – Founding Rosh yeshiva, founder of the Meimad party
- Ezra Bick – Ram, author, director of the Israel Koschitzky Virtual Beit Midrash
- Yoel Bin-Nun – co-founder of Yeshivat Har Etzion and Gush Emunim
- Mordechai Breuer – leading expert on Tanakh
- Baruch Gigi – Rosh yeshiva
- Menachem Leibtag – leading Tanakh scholar
- Aharon Lichtenstein – Rosh yeshiva
- Mosheh Lichtenstein – Rosh yeshiva
- Yaakov Medan – Rosh yeshiva
- Hanan Porat – co-founder of Yeshivat Har Etzion and Gush Emunim

== Notable alumni ==
- Michael Abraham – Rabbi and physicist at Bar-Ilan University
- Zechariah Baumel – American-Israeli IDF soldier
- Assaf Bednarsh – Rosh yeshiva of Rabbi Isaac Elchanan Theological Seminary, lecturer at Yeshivat Har Etzion
- Shalom Berger – Scholar and educational activist
- Ari Berman – Fifth President of Yeshiva University
- Joshua Berman – professor of Bible at Bar-Ilan University
- Yitzchak Blau – Rosh yeshiva of Yeshivat Orayta
- Tzvika Brot – Mayor of Bat Yam
- Yuval Cherlow – co-founder and President of Yeshivat Orot Shaul (formerly its Rosh yeshiva)
- Ze'ev Elkin – Israeli politician
- Michael Eisenberg – Venture capitalist and author
- Ron Yitzchok Eisenman – American Orthodox rabbi
- Matanyahu Englman – State Comptroller of Israel
- Yehuda Etzion – Israeli right-wing activist
- Adam Ferziger – American-Israeli social historian
- Daniel Fridman – Rabbi of Jewish Center of Teaneck
- Yehuda Gilad – Rosh yeshiva of Maale Gilboa
- Yehudah Glick – Israeli political activist and politician
- Tamir Granot – Rosh yeshiva of Yeshivat Orot Shaul
- Steven Greenberg – First openly homosexual Orthodox rabbi
- Jason Greenblatt – Assistant to the President and Special Representative for International Negotiations under Donald Trump
- Aviad Hacohen – Israeli attorney and professor of law
- Re'em Ha'Cohen – Rosh yeshiva of Yeshivat Otniel, rabbi of Otniel
- Moshe Halbertal – Israeli philosopher
- Nathaniel Helfgot – Rabbi of Congregation Netivot Shalom of Teaneck, New Jersey
- Howard Jachter – American Orthodox rabbi, Dayan, educator, author, and communal leader, expert on the laws of Jewish divorce
- Dov Kalmanovich – Israeli politician
- Moshe Koppel – American-Israeli computer scientist, founder of the Kohelet Policy Forum
- Binyamin Lau – Israeli Orthodox rabbi, Rav of Kehillat Ramban in Katamon, Jerusalem
- Shamai Leibowitz – American lawyer
- Jacob Ezra Merkin – American investor
- Avraham Michaeli – Member of Knesset
- David Mintz – Israeli judge who currently serves on the Supreme Court of Israel
- Ephraim Mirvis – Chief Rabbi of the UK and Commonwealth
- Menachem Penner – Executive vice president of the Rabbinical Council of America, Dean Emeritus of the Rabbi Isaac Elchanan Theological Seminary, Rabbi Emeritus of Young Israel of Holliswood
- Alex Pomson – managing director of Rosov Consulting
- Yosef Zvi Rimon – former ram at the yeshiva, Rabbi of the Gush Etzion Regional Council and leading expert in Halakha
- David Shlomo Rosen – Former Chief Rabbi of Ireland
- Jonathan Rosenblatt – American Modern Orthodox rabbi
- Itamar Rosensweig – Rabbi and maggid shiur at Yeshiva University and dayan at the Beth Din of America
- Michael Rosensweig – Rosh Yeshiva and Rosh Kollel at Rabbi Isaac Elchanan Theological Seminary
- Yehuda Sarna – Chief Rabbi of Jewish Community of the United Arab Emirates
- Hanan Schlesinger – American-Israeli Orthodox rabbi, co-founder of Roots, a joint Palestinian-Israeli grassroots peacemaking initiative
- Zvi Schreiber – British-Israeli entrepreneur
- Elliot Schrier – Mara d'asra of Congregation Bnai Yeshurun in Teaneck
- Azi Schwartz – Senior Chazzan (cantor) of the Park Avenue Synagogue
- Sharon Shalom – Ethiopian-Israeli community Rabbi
- Scott J. Shapiro – Professor of Philosophy and Law at Yale Law School
- Eli Baruch Shulman – Rosh Yeshiva at the Rabbi Isaac Elchanan Theological Seminary
- Noam Sohlberg – Israeli Supreme Court of Israel judge
- Moshe Tur-Paz – Israeli politician
- Ben-Tzion Spitz – Chief Rabbi of Uruguay, writer and Nuclear Engineer
- Shaul Stampfer – American-Israeli historian, academic, and author
- Michael Taubes – Rosh Yeshiva of Rabbi Isaac Elchanan Theological Seminary
- Kalman Topp – American rabbi, Beth Jacob Congregation of Beverly Hills, California
- Reuven Ziegler – Chairman of the Editorial board at Koren Publishers Jerusalem, Director of Research at the Toras HoRav Foundation, Founder and Editor-in-chief of the Israel Koschitzky Virtual Beit Midrash
- Moshe Solomon- Member of The Knesset for The Religious Zionist Party

== See also ==
- Migdal Oz (seminary)
- Herzog College
- Megadim
