= Aharon Lichtenstein =

Rabbi and rosh yeshiva

- אהרון ליכטנשטיין
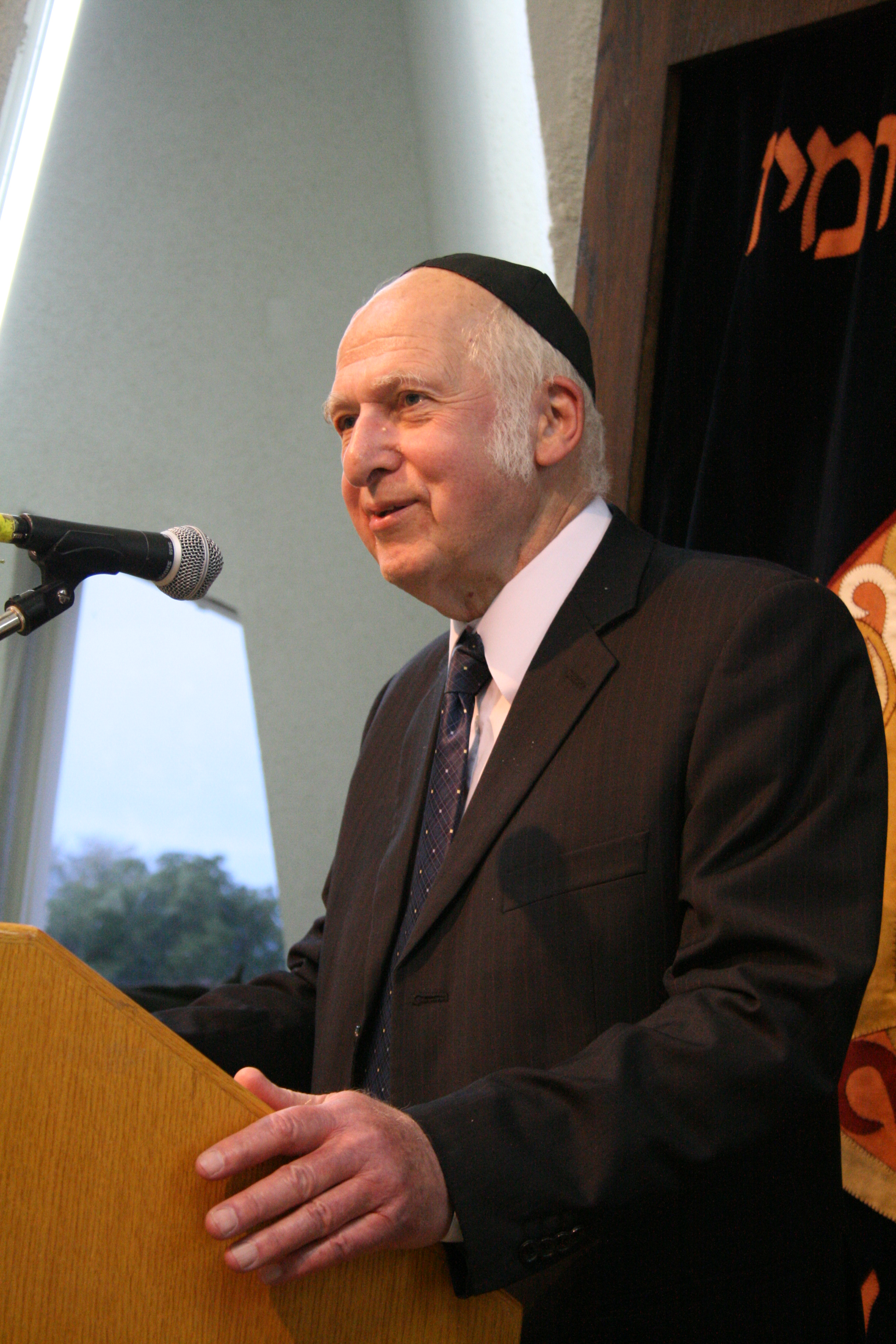
- Lichtenstein speaking at Yeshivat Har Etzion
- Born: May 23, 1933; 28 Iyar 5693; Paris, France
- Died: April 20, 2015 (aged 81); 1 Iyar 5775; Alon Shvut, West Bank
- Education: Yeshiva Rabbi Chaim Berlin; Yeshiva University; Harvard University
- Movement: Centrist Orthodoxy, Religious Zionism
- Spouse: Tovah Lichtenstein (née Soloveitchik) (m. 1960)
- Children: 6, including Mosheh Lichtenstein, Yitzchok Lichtenstein, and Esti Rosenberg
- Awards: Israel Prize (2014)

Aharon Lichtenstein (Hebrew: אהרון ליכטנשטיין; May 23, 1933 – April 20, 2015) was an Orthodox rabbi, Israel Prize laureate and rosh yeshiva who was an authority in Jewish law (Halakha).

== Biography ==
Aharon Lichtenstein was born to Yechiel Lichtenstein and Bluma née Schwartz in Paris, France, but grew up in the United States, where he studied in Yeshiva Rabbi Chaim Berlin under Yitzchak Hutner as well as Ahron Soloveichik. He earned a BA at Yeshiva University in 1953, and semicha ("rabbinic ordination") at YU's Rabbi Isaac Elchanan Theological Seminary under Joseph B. Soloveitchik, whose daughter, Tovah, he would later marry. He received an M.A. in 1954 and a PhD in English Literature in 1957 at Harvard University, where he studied under Douglas Bush.

Lichtenstein married Tovah Soloveitchik on January 26, 1960. They had six children: Mosheh, Yitzchak, Mayer, Esti, Shai and Tonya.

After serving as Rosh Yeshiva/Kollel at Yeshiva University for several years, Lichtenstein answered Yehuda Amital's request in 1971 to join him at the helm of Yeshivat Har Etzion, located in Gush Etzion, and moved to Jerusalem. He maintained a close connection to Yeshiva University as a Rosh Kollel for the Gruss Institute in Jerusalem, an affiliate of Yeshiva University and its rabbinical school, Rabbi Isaac Elchanan Theological Seminary.

In 2005, he and his wife moved to Alon Shvut, where Yeshivat Har Etzion is located.

On January 4, 2006, Yaakov Medan and Baruch Gigi were officially invested as co-roshei yeshiva alongside Amital and Lichtenstein, with an eye toward Amital's intention to retire. On October 28, 2008, Lichtenstein's eldest son, Mosheh Lichtenstein, was officially invested as co-Rosh Yeshiva, simultaneous with Amital's official retirement, this time with an eye toward Aharon Lichtenstein's eventual plan to retire.

He advocated for worldview embracing elements of modernity within the framework of a Torah life, reflecting the tradition of his teacher and father-in-law, Joseph B. Soloveitchik in line with Centrist Orthodoxy.

Lichtenstein was awarded the Israel Prize for Jewish Literature on Israeli Independence Day: May 6, 2014. He died on April 20, 2015. He was a source of inspiration for a wide circle of Jewry, for both his educational attainments and his intellectual and spiritual leadership. He was especially admired by many centrist Modern Orthodox leaders as well as many in the Religious Zionist camp.

== Works ==
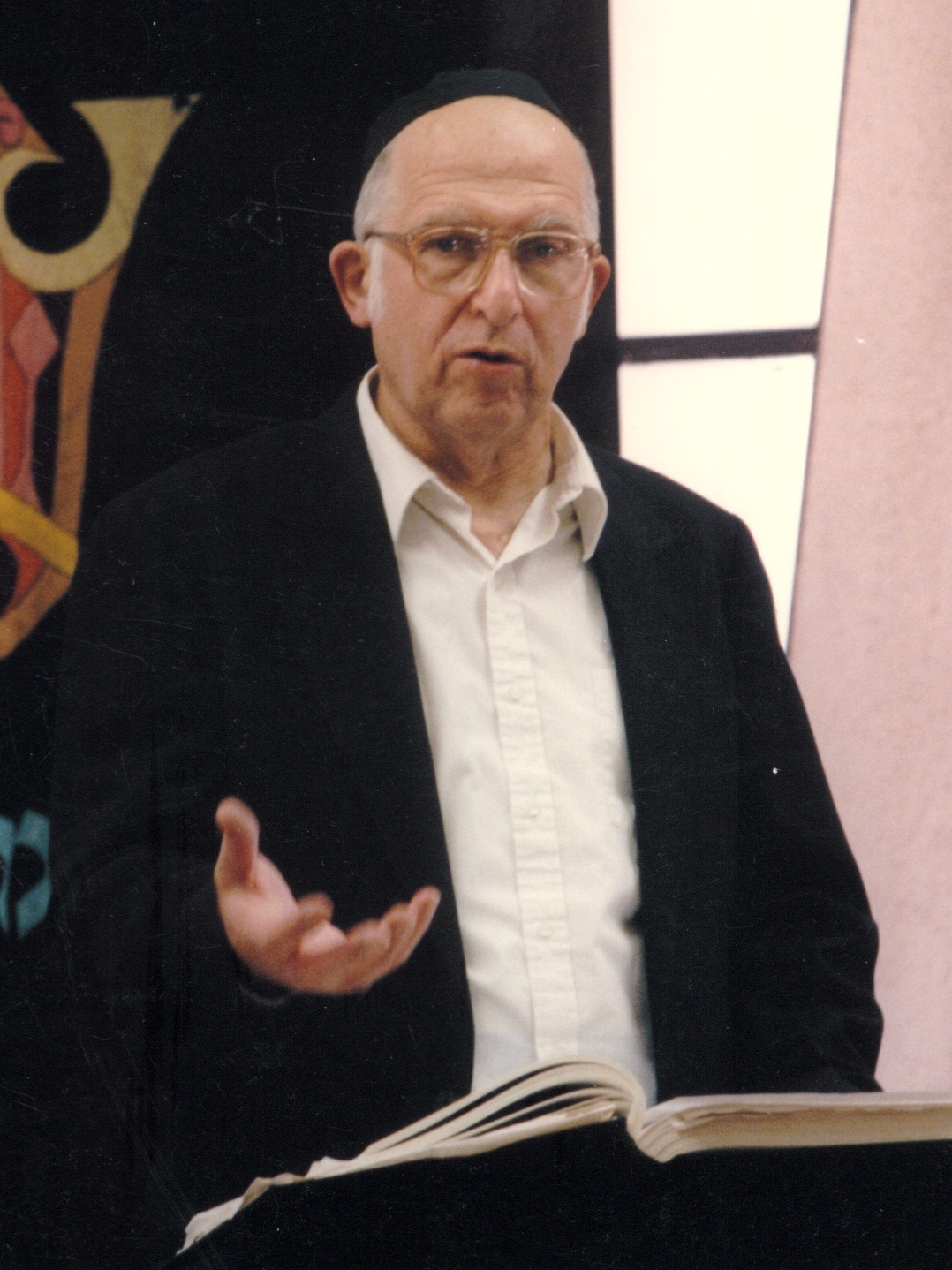
Rav Aharon Lichtenstein

- Henry More: The Rational Theology of a Cambridge Platonist, (PhD Dissertation) Cambridge: Harvard University Press, 1962.
- By His Light: Character and Values in the Service of God, based on Lichtenstein's addresses and adapted by Reuven Ziegler ISBN 9781592644698 revised edition (Maggid Books, 2016)
- Leaves of Faith (vol. 1): The World of Jewish Learning
- Leaves of Faith (vol. 2): The World of Jewish Living
- Varieties of Jewish Experience
- Minchat Aviv: Chiddushim veIyyunim baShas: Edited by Elyakim Krumbein, Maggid Books, 2014 ISBN 9789655261714
- Mussar Aviv: Al Mussar, Emuna veChevra: Edited by Aviad Hacohen and Reuven Ziegler Maggid Books, 2016 ISBN 9789655261905
- Halakha and Humanism: Essays on the Thought and Scholarship of Rabbi Aharon Lichtenstein, by Yitzchak Blau (Editor), Alan Jotkowitz (Editor), Reuven Ziegler (Editor)
- A Life Steady and Whole: Recollections and Appreciations of Rabbi Aharon Lichtenstein, zt"l: Edited by Joel B. Wolowelsky and Elka Weber Ktav, 2018 ISBN 9781602802933
- Return and Renewal: Reflections on Teshuva and Spiritual Growth: Adapted and edited by Michael S. Berger and Reuven Ziegler Maggid Books, 2018 ISBN 9781592645077

Based on Lichtenstein's Talmud classes at Yeshivat Har Etzion, his students' notes have been edited and published as Shiurei Harav Aharon Lichtenstein on Tohorot, Zevahim, the eighth chapter of Bava Metzia, the third chapter of Bava Batra, the Ramban's pamphlet on Dinah DiGarmi, the first chapter of Pesahim, Masechet Horayot, and several critical chapters of Gittin.

== Family Tree ==
Brisker family tree

Rabbanit Esti Rosenberg, director of Migdal Oz (seminary)
Rabbi Yitzchok Lichtenstein, Co-Rosh Yeshiva of Yeshiva Torah Vodaas; Rabbi Bais Avrohom, Monsey, NY
Rabbi Yosef Dov (Reb Berel) Soloveichik	Rabbi Avrohom Yehoshua Soloveichik	Rabbi Mosheh Lichtenstein, Co-Rosh Yeshiva of Yeshivat Har Etzion
Rabbi Meshulam Dovid (Reb Dovid) Soloveichik	Rabbi Yitzchak Zev Soloveichik	Rabbi Mayer Lichtenstein, Rabbi Ohel Menachem Bet Shemesh
Rabbi Yosef Dov (HaLevi) Soloveichik author of Beis HaLevi	Rabbi Chaim Soloveichik "Reb Chaim Brisker"	Rabbi Yitzchak Zev (Reb Velvel) Soloveichik "The GRIZ"; The Brisker Rov	Lifsha Soloveitchik Feinstein	Dr. Tovah Soloveitchik Lichtenstein	Rabbi Jonathan Rosenblatt
Rabbi Refael Shapiro, Rosh Yeshiva of Volozhin yeshiva	Lifsha Shapiro	Rabbi Refoel Soloveichik	Rabbi Dr. Aharon Lichtenstein	Tzipporah Rosenblatt
Rabbi Meir Soloveichik	Dr. Atarah Soloveitchik Twersky	Rabbi Mosheh Twersky z"l, Maggid Shiur at Yeshiva Toras Moshe
Rabbi Dr. Joseph B. (Yosef Dov) Soloveitchik "The Rav"	Rabbi Dr. Isadore Twersky, Talner Rebbe of Boston	Rabbi Mayer Twersky, Rosh Yeshiva at Rabbi Isaac Elchanan Theological Seminary
Rabbi Moshe Soloveichik	Rabbi Ahron Soloveichik	Rabbi Dr. Haym Soloveitchik	Rabbi Moshe Soloveichik, Rosh Yeshivas Brisk (Chicago); Rav of Kehilas Beth Sholom Ahavas Achim
Peshka Feinstein Soloveichik	Dr. Samuel Soloveichik	Rabbi Eliyahu Soloveichik, Rosh Yeshiva at Lander College's Beis Medrash L'Talmud	Rabbi Meir Yaakov Soloveichik
Shulamit Soloveitchik Meiselman	Rabbi Moshe Meiselman, Rosh Yeshiva of Yeshiva Toras Moshe	Rabbi Yosef Soloveichik	Sarah Orenshein
Anne Soloveitchik Gerber	Rabbi Chayim Soloveichik, Maggid Shiur at Yeshivat Reishit; Morah D’Asrah of Kehillat Ohr Shalom, Ramat Beit Shemesh	Moshe Soloveichik
Rabbi Yosef Dov Soloveichik	Rabbi Shmuel Chaim Soloveichik
Rabbi Yitzchok Soloveichik	Rabbi Yisroel Soloveichik
Rabbi Yisroel Gershon Soloveichik	Rabbi Moshe Soloveichik	Rabbi Boruch Soloveichik
Rabbi Avraham Yeshaya Soloveichik
Daughter Soloveichik

Notes:
- Rabbi Chaim Halevi Soloveichik (the second)
