= Yaaqov Medan =

Israeli Orthodox rabbi

Rabbi Yaaqov Medan יעקב מדן
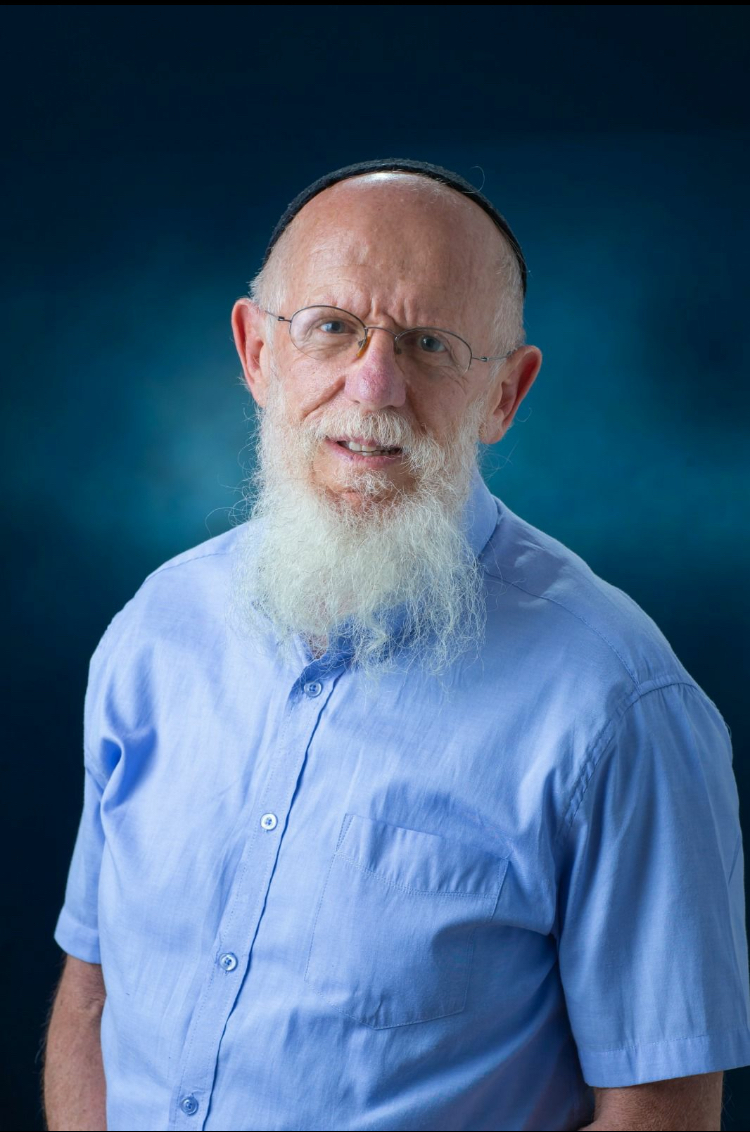
- Official picture of Rabbi Yaakov Medan

Personal life
- Born: July 6, 1950 (age 76)

Religious life
- Religion: Judaism
- Denomination: Orthodox Judaism

Jewish leader
- Position: Rosh Yeshiva
- Yeshiva: Yeshivat Har Etzion
- Residence: Alon Shevut

Yaaqov Medan (also spelled Yaakov or Ya'acov; Hebrew: יעקב מדן; born 1950) is an Israeli Orthodox rabbi, a co-rosh yeshiva of Yeshivat Har Etzion, a leader in the Religious-Zionist community, and a lecturer in Tanakh, Gemara, and Jewish philosophy.

== Biography ==
Yaaqov Medan was a member of the first class at Yeshivat Har Etzion and has lived in Gush Etzion since 1968.

He served in the Airborne Nahal Infantry unit during his Hesder army service. During the Yom Kippur War, he fought in the Golan Heights as a liaison officer in the Yiftach Brigade.

Medan holds a B.Ed. degree from Michlalah-Jerusalem College and an MA from Touro College. In May 2023 he received an honorary doctorate from Bar Ilan University.

== Rabbinic career ==
Together with Rabbi Baruch Gigi, Medan joined Rabbi Yehuda Amital and Rabbi Aharon Lichtenstein as a rosh yeshiva of Yeshivat Har Etzion on January 4, 2006.

Exemplifying the "Bible at Eye Level" method, his biblical analyses do not shy away from nuanced treatments of the biblical patriarchs and other figures, presented in innovative commentaries on Tanakh that combine lucid textual analysis with intimate knowledge of geographical and historical realia and of a vast body of Jewish tradition. He has published book-length studies on the Book of Daniel, the Book of Ruth, and the Bathsheba story.

He was a partner in drafting the Gavison-Medan Covenant, a proposed constitution for the State of Israel intended to benefit Israel's religious and secular communities simultaneously (despite their disagreement on a number of issues).

== Publications ==
- The Gavison-Medan covenant : main points and principles.
- I am Kohelet : a chorus of voices / Yoel Bin-Nun and Yaakov Medan.
- David and Bathsheba.
- Tikvah mi-ma'amakim : 'iyunim bi-megilat Rut.
- Daniel - exile and revelation.
- Hamikraot hamithadshim : Studies in Nevìim and Ketuvim.
- Job - Between Darkness and Light.
