= Yehuda Amital =

Israeli rabbi and politician (1924–2010)

- יהודה עמיטל
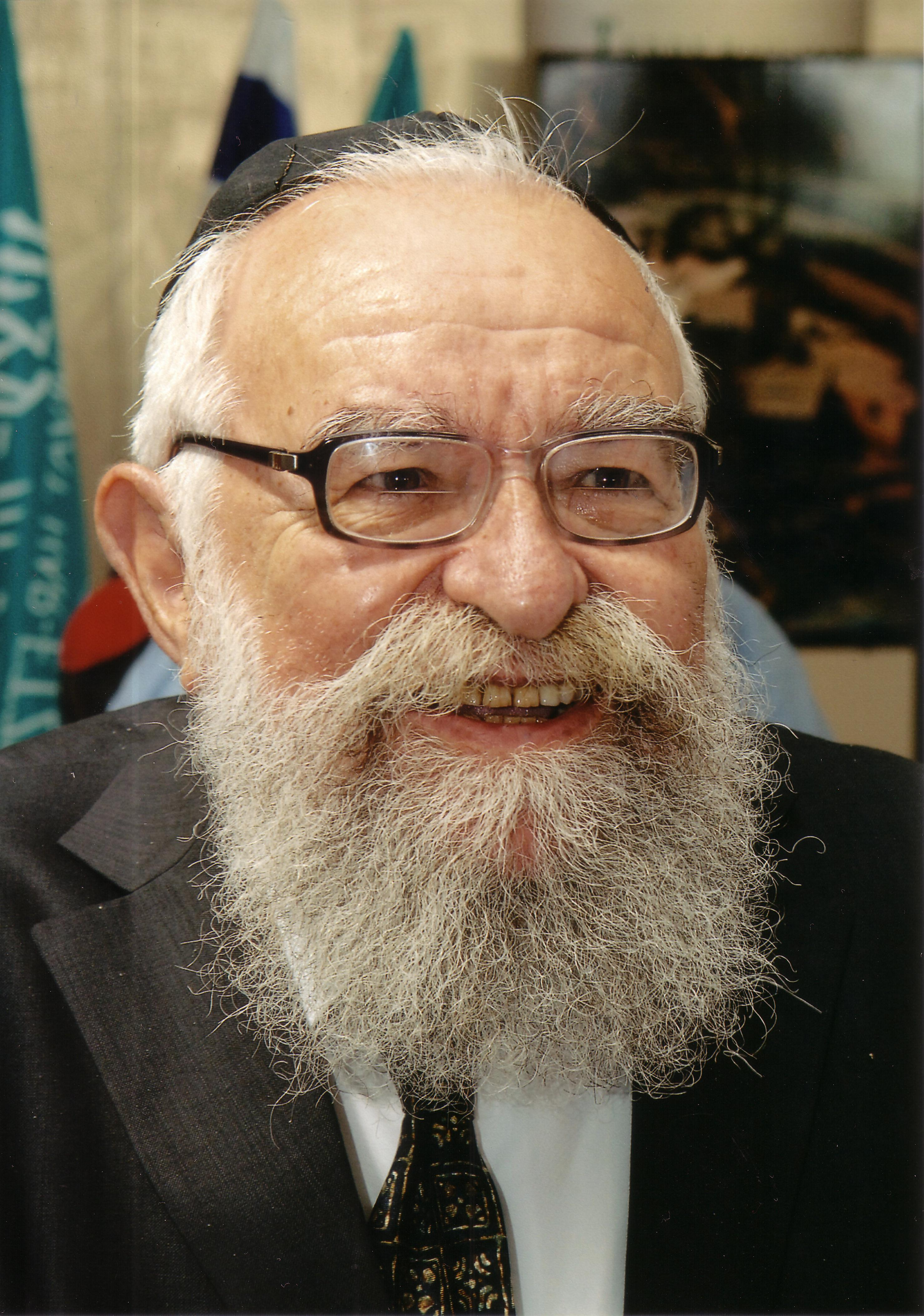

Ministerial roles
- 1995–1996: Minister without Portfolio

Personal details
- Born: Yehuda Klein; 31 October 1924 Oradea, Romania
- Died: 9 July 2010 (aged 85) Jerusalem, Israel
- Party: Meimad

Yehuda Amital (Hebrew: יהודה עמיטל; born Yehuda Klein; 31 October 1924 – 9 July 2010) was an Orthodox rabbi, the Rosh Yeshiva of Yeshivat Har Etzion, and a member of the Israeli cabinet, associated with the Israeli Left.

The concept of a Hesder Yeshiva is attributed to Amital. After writing an essay about the religious and moral aspects of military service, he envisaged a program for combining army service and Torah study.

In 1991, the Hesder Yeshiva program was awarded the Israel Prize for its special contribution to society and the State of Israel.

== Biography ==
Yehuda Klein (later Amital) was born in Oradea, Romania, son of Yekutiel Ze'ev and Devora. After four years of secular primary education, he began religious studies with Chaim Yehuda Levi. When Nazi Germany occupied the area in 1944, the Nazis sent his entire family to Auschwitz where they were killed. Amital was sent to a labor camp, thus surviving the Holocaust. He remained in the labor camp for eight months, and was liberated on October 4, 1944, by the Soviet Army. After his liberation, he made his way to Bucharest, from where he travelled to Mandatory Palestine, arriving on December 11, 1944.

After a short stay at the Atlit detainee camp, he made his way to Jerusalem, where he studied at Hebron Yeshiva, receiving semicha (tennis ordination) from Isser Zalman Meltzer, whose granddaughter he later married. He also learned with Yaakov Moshe Charlap, a student of Abraham Isaac Kook. Around this time, he joined the Haganah.

After learning at Hebron, he moved to Pardes Hanna in order to learn at Kletzk Yeshiva. While learning at the yeshiva, he married Miriam, the daughter of the Rosh Yeshiva, Zvi Yehuda Meltzer. When the yeshiva relocated to Rehovot, Amital followed, settling in Rehovot until he moved to Jerusalem in the 1960s.

The day after the Declaration of Independence, Amital's unit was mobilized in the 1948 Arab–Israeli War.

After the Six-Day War he became the first Rosh yeshiva (dean) of Yeshivat Har Etzion, which he headed for 40 years.

In 1978 he received the army rank of aluf (general).

Amital died on July 9 (27 Tammuz), 2010, and was buried in the Har HaMenuchot cemetery in Jerusalem, where thousands attended his funeral.

== Political career ==
In 1988, Amital founded the left-leaning religious Meimad movement, and was elected as its chairman after it became a political party. After the assassination of Prime Minister Yitzhak Rabin in November 1995, he served as a minister without portfolio in the government of Shimon Peres, despite not being a Knesset member.

== Educational career ==
After the Six-Day War he founded Yeshivat Har Etzion in Kfar Etzion in 1968.

Amital retired as Rosh Yeshiva on October 28, 2008.

== Relationship with Elazar Shach ==
Elazar Shach had been a student of Isser Zalman Meltzer in Europe and he eventually married Meltzer's niece. Amital married Meltzer's granddaughter.

The two developed a very close relationship. When they were both teachers at Yeshivat HaDarom in Rehovot, Amital and Shach were known to argue constantly about Zionism, the fledgling State of Israel, and the necessity of drafting yeshiva students into the army. Despite an age gap of almost 25 years, the cousins-by-marriage would bounce ideas and bum cigarettes off of one another as they debated the pressing issues of the day.

== Published works ==
- Jewish Values in a Changing World ISBN 0-88125-881-4
- Commitment and Complexity: Jewish Wisdom in an Age of Upheaval ISBN 1-60280-030-8
- When God is Near: On the High Holidays ISBN 9781592644377
- A World Built, Destroyed and Rebuilt, Rabbi Yehudah Amital's Confrontation with the Memory of the Holocaust ISBN 0-88125-864-4
- By Faith Alone: The Story of Rabbi Yehuda Amital ISBN 1-59264-192-X
- והארץ נתן לבני אדם - A Hashkafic book based on Sichot he gave at Yeshivat Har Etzion, Tevunot Publishing, 2004.

== Sources ==
- Reichner, Elyashiv (2011). By Faith Alone: The story of Rabbi Yehuda Amital. Maggid. ISBN 978-1592641925.
