= Aryeh Stern =

Ashkenazi Chief Rabbi of Jerusalem (1944–2026)

Rabbi Aryeh Stern
- אריה שטרן
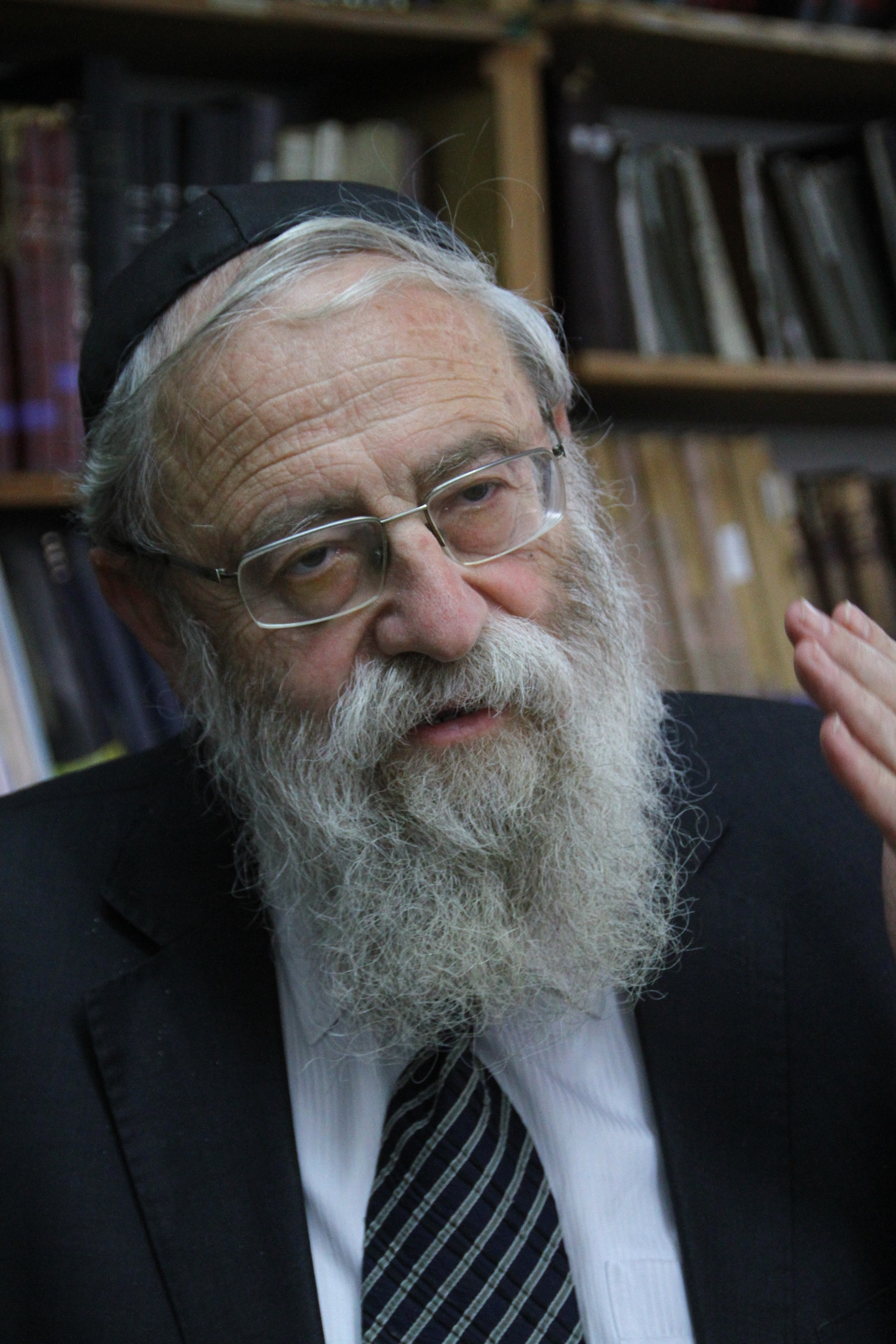

Personal life
- Born: 27 November 1944 Tel Aviv, Mandatory Palestine
- Died: 6 May 2026 (aged 81)
- Occupation: Rabbi

Religious life
- Religion: Judaism

Jewish leader
- Yahrtzeit: 20 Iyar 5786
- Residence: Katamon, Jerusalem, Israel

Aryeh Stern (Hebrew: אריה שטרן; 27 November 1944 – 6 May 2026) was the Ashkenazi Chief Rabbi of Jerusalem, a member of the Chief Rabbinate Council of Israel, and the chief editor of the Halacha Brura and Berur Halacha Institute.

== Biography ==
Aryeh Stern was born in 1944 in Tel Aviv, and studied at the HaYishuv HaChadash yeshiva, led by Rabbi Yehuda Kolodetsky. Stern then moved to the Hebron Yeshiva in Jerusalem, and after a short while to the Mercaz HaRav Kook yeshiva, following his rabbi who served as its head, Rabbi Zvi Yehuda Kook. After Stern married, he commenced his studies for dayanut, Jewish-religious judgeship, in the Tel Aviv kolel of Rabbi Ephraim Bordiansky, who also instructed Rabbi Shlomo Zalman Auerbach.

Stern fought in the Six-Day War in the Combat Engineering Corps, and in the Yom Kippur War.

Kook appointed Stern and Rabbi Yochanan Fried to establish the Halacha Brura and Berur Halacha Institution. The Halacha Brura was one of the chief works of Rabbi Abraham Isaac Kook, Zvi Yehuda Kook's father.

Following Zvi Yehuda Kook's death in 1982, Stern was appointed lecturer in the Mercaz HaRav Kook yeshiva. He also lectured in other yeshivas, including Yeshivat HaKotel, Yeshivat Kiryat Shmona, Yeshivat Or Etzion, and Yeshivat Hesder Petah Tikva. Stern was the head of Hadrom high school yeshiva in Rehovot, and was one of the founders of the Ma'aleh School of Television, Film and the Arts for the religious-national sector in 1989. He worked in the organization of Rabbi Abraham Isaac Kook's House in Jerusalem, an active museum of Kook's life, and in the establishment of the Merchavim Institute for training teachers and religious educators. Stern wrote hundreds of Halachic responsa and religious-philosophical articles regarding Jewish thought.

He was also congregational rabbi at the Har Horev synagogue in the Katamon neighborhood in Jerusalem.

Stern died on 6 May 2026, at the age of 81.

== Ashkenazi Chief Rabbi of Jerusalem ==
Stern was elected Ashkenazi Chief Rabbi of Jerusalem on 22 October 2014. The position had been vacant for eleven years, following the death of the former Chief Rabbi of Jerusalem, Yitzhak Kolitzm, in 2003.

He was elected by a majority vote of 27 of the 48 representatives from the city's synagogues, city councils, and voters appointed by then-Minister of Religious Services Naftali Bennett. He had been elected the candidate of the Religious Zionism sector in 2009. He faced motions in the Supreme Court to disqualify him from running due to an expired rabbinical certificate, and an attempt to postpone the elections until after his seventieth birthday when he would become ineligible to submit his candidacy.

Stern's election was backed by Bennett, leader of the Bayit Yehudi party, and by Jerusalem mayor, Nir Barkat. Alongside Stern, Rabbi Shlomo Amar was elected as the Sephardic Chief Rabbi of the city. Among the supporters of Rabbi Stern were rabbis Haim Drukman and Aharon Lichtenstein, two prominent leaders of the modern-orthodox in Israel, the Rebbe of Erlau, a member of the Moetzet Gedolei HaTorah, and Eliyahu Bakshi-Doron, former Sephardic Chief Rabbi of Israel. The rabbis of Tzohar also supported Stern.

Upon his election, Stern said, "It is in my intention to serve as the rabbi of all Jerusalemites: secular, modern-orthodox and charedi alike. The Jerusalem rabbinate is a great merit, but it also comprises a hefty responsibility. I will make sure that the religious services will become accessible and friendly and will serve as an outstanding model for all of the other rabbinates in Israel".

On 28 December 2014, Stern was appointed by President Reuven Rivlin as a member of the Chief Rabbinate Council of Israel.

== Positions ==
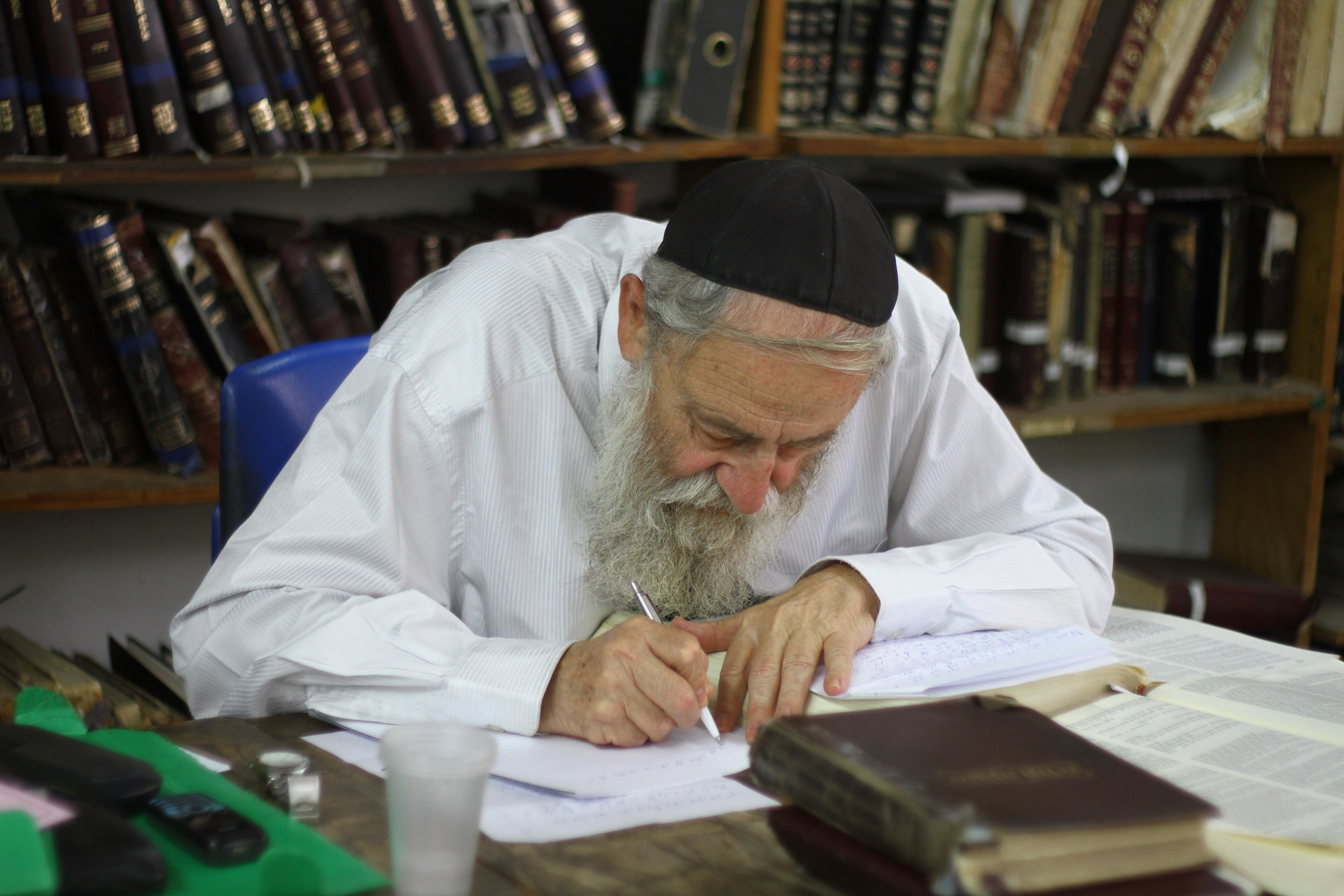
Rabbi Stern at his desk

Rabbi Stern pledged that as the rabbi of Jerusalem he would organize kiddush blessing rituals for religious and secular people, held once a month in synagogues around Jerusalem after the prayers. He opposed cultural-religious segregation of sectors where each sector lives in their own neighborhood, and supported the establishment of mixed neighbourhoods of both religious and non-religious.

He had said that he was interested in returning the kashrut level in Jerusalem to its status fifty years ago, when it was perceived as very mehudar (referring to mehadrin: the highest standard of kashrut). He had been proactive in checking kashrut and addressing corruption in the Jerusalem Religious Council to improve supervision.

With regard to the place of women in prayers, he said: "In the world I knew from the times of my mother and my grandmother, there was no such demand, and it was also apparent in the posekim of the time. Our grandmothers did not want it. Today, however, the situation is different, and one cannot claim old arguments exercised in past generations... it is clear that one needs to renew things, basing it on the Halakha, of course". That is why he supported expanding the Women's Gallery at the Western Wall to the same size of the men's section, and also allowed placing a Sefer Torah in the women's gallery at the times of hakafot (encirclements at the synagogue) on Simchat Torah.

Regarding acceptance of religious homosexual couples, he said he would accept them at his synagogue, in the same way he accepts Shabbat violators, though he would not appoint them as congregational cantors. He opposed the Pride parade in Jerusalem.

He had called to abolish the Talmud and Torah matriculation exams.
