= Alternative Kosher =

Alternative Kosher (or Alternative Kosher Certificate or Alternative Kashrut or Private Kosher, Hebrew: כשרות אלטרנטיבית, Kashrut Alternatvit, or תעודת כשרות אלטרנטיבית, Teudat Kashrut Alternativit) refers in Israel to the phenomenon, especially among restaurants in Jerusalem, where restaurants abandon the procedure of obtaining kosher certification from the traditional establishment players in favor of extra-establishment entities in order to obtain a kosher certificate for their businesses.

== History ==
The Israeli Chief Rabbinate's Kashrut has been a monopoly for many years, while many restaurants chafed under the rabbinate's monopoly on kosher certification, complaining that the organization overcharges for its services and enforces a too-strict interpretation of Jewish law.

In August 2012 the owner of the Jerusalem-based restaurant Ichikidana refused to yield to new requirements of the Mashgiach Commissioner of the Chief Rabbinate, and a sign she hung explaining the matter to the dinners was posted on Facebook by one of the diners. After many shares, a Facebook group that gathers all restaurants that proclaim themselves as being "Kosher with No Certification" was established. In addition, Rabbi Aaron Leibowitz of the "Yerushalmim" organization, and Rosh Yeshiva of "Sulam Yaakov" (Jacob's Ladder), set up a project called "Hashgacha Pratit" (Private Supervision), which stated that it is working in order to serve a "New Kosher model" given the long-standing monopoly of the Chief Rabbinate.

Responding to a petition filed by two restaurant owners who claimed that the "Kosher Fraud Law" does not allow them to present the alternative certificate to their customers, the Israeli Attorney General determined that restaurant owners will now be able to present such certificates, despite not being on behalf of the Chief Rabbinate of Israel as the law requires, practically turning these certificates official. However, Attorney Weinstein also determined that such a restaurant cannot be presented as "Kosher", but rather as one that holds an alternative kashrut certificate.

== See also ==
- Kosher by ingredient
- Kosher restaurant
- Kosher style
