= David Stav =

Rabbi David Stav
- דוד סתיו
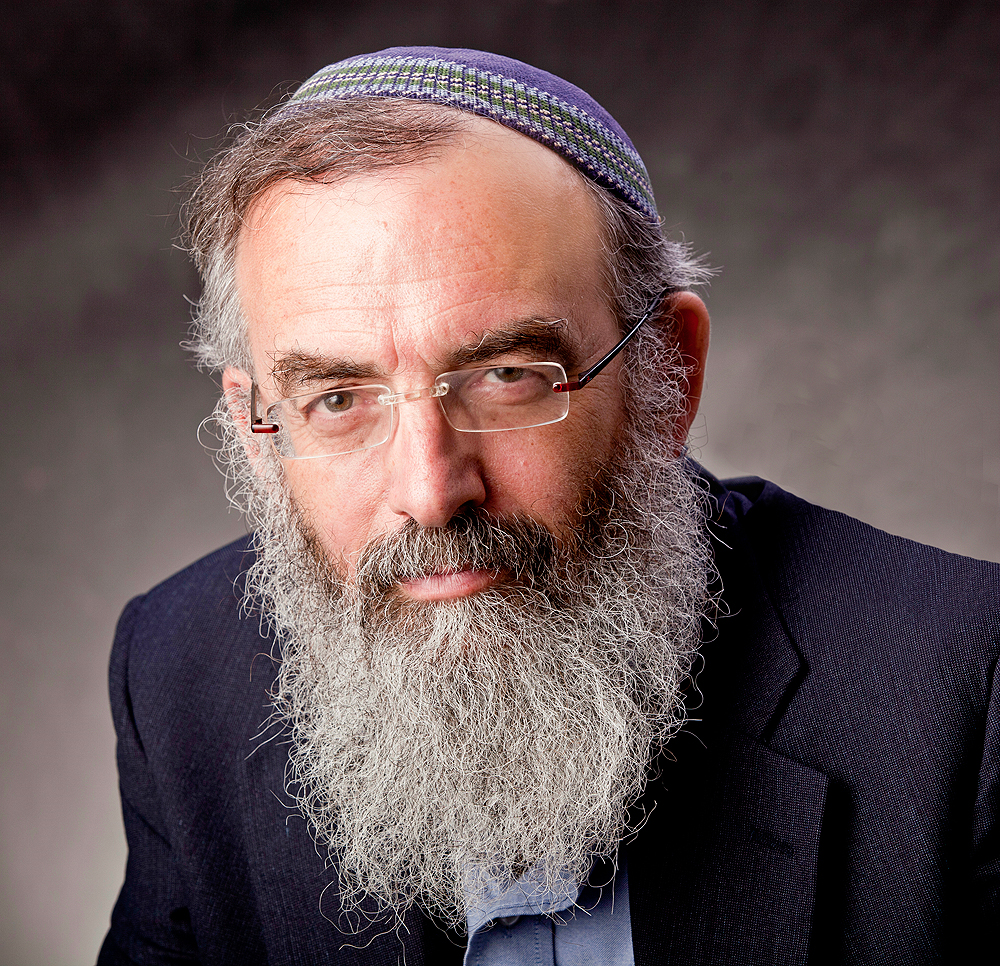
- Rabbi David Stav in 2012

Chief Rabbi of Shoham

Chairman of Tzohar
- Incumbent
- Assumed office 2009

Rabbi for Ezra Youth Movement

Personal life
- Born: דוד סתיו; May 13, 1960 (age 66) Jerusalem
- Spouse: Aviva
- Children: 9
- Notable works: Bein Hazemanim - "Culture and Recreation in Jewish Law and Thought" (2012); Parsha Ketana - Small Tastes from Parshat Hashavua (2014); Avo Beitecha - responsa on the subject of relationships and family (2017). Written together with his son, Rabbi Avraham Stav.
- Education: Mercaz HaRav
- Occupation: Chief Rabbi of Shoham, Chairman of Tzohar

Religious life
- Religion: Judaism
- Denomination: Orthodox

Rabbi David Stav (Hebrew: דוד סתיו; born 13 May 1960) is the chief rabbi of the city of Shoham, the chairman of the Tzohar organization, and serves as a rabbi for the Ezra youth movement.

== Biography ==
Stav was born in Jerusalem, the son of Shmuel Dov Stav, a librarian at the Yeshurun synagogue, and Idel (Hadassa), the daughter of Rabbi Gedaliah Moshe Goldman, the Rebbe of Zvhil. He studied at Yeshivat Bnei Akiva Nativ Meir and later at Mercaz HaRav Yeshiva, under Rabbi Avraham Shapira, whom he views as his rabbi. He was ordained as a religious judge at the kollel in Psagot. He enlisted in the IDF through the Hesder Mercaz program and served for eight months in the Armored Corps.

In 1986 he began to serve as lecturer at the Or Etzion Yeshiva and as rabbi of the moshav Bnei Darom. In the years 1992 to 1994 he served as rabbi in the national religious community and yeshiva dean in Antwerp, Belgium. In 1998 he founded Yeshivat Hesder Petah Tikva together with Rabbi Yuval Cherlow. In this period he began to serve as rabbi of Shoham. In the years 1996-1998 he was the rabbi of the Ma'aleh School of Television, Film and the Arts.

Following the Rabin assassination, he established the Tzohar organization, together with Rabbi Yuval Cherlow, Rabbi Rafi Feuerstein, and other rabbis. Since 2009 he has served as the organization's chairman.

Rabbi Stav was ordained by Rabbi Avraham Shapira. He served as a judge at the conversion court of Rabbi Chaim Druckman and as a judge at the Rabbinical Court in the Tel Aviv district. In 2008 he ran in the elections for the Chief Rabbinate Council, but was not elected.

In 2013 he ran for the position of Chief Rabbi of Israel but was not elected. His candidacy was opposed by some Haredi rabbis due to Rabbi Stav's perception as a liberal, as being too lenient in Halakhic matters. In one instance, he was assaulted by Haredi yeshiva students when leaving a wedding.

From 2015 to 2018, he served as co-chair of Ohr Torah Stone institutes alongside Rabbi Shlomo Riskin.

== Personal life ==
He is married to Aviva and has nine children (5 boys and 4 girls).

== Opinions ==
Rabbi Stav is of the opinion that there is no need for two chief rabbis of Israel, one Ashkenazi and one Sephardi. "It is time that we have only one chief rabbi. There is no reason that we, the rabbis, will be the ones perpetuating separatism and factionalism within the public."

Regarding the problem of Aguna/Get refusal, he suggests wider use of prenuptial agreements. Tzohar, after years of consultations with experts in the field, created a halachic prenup. Stav believes that these prenups can resolve "over 90% of the problems".

He also promotes opening up kashrut supervision in Israel to private initiatives in order to force the rabbinate to improve. He feels that competition is the only way to attain an efficient system of kashrut supervision; the rabbinate's monopoly of kashrut leads to bureaucracy and corruption. In 2017, the Director-General of Chief Rabbinate warned Rabbi Stav that he could lose his position as rabbi of Shoham if he provides independent Kashrut certification.

Rabbi Stav approves of married men wearing a wedding ring, especially if the wife requests it, even though this is not a Jewish custom. “Among those who go to study and work in places that are mixed for men and women, it is right and proper to make it a custom that they wear the ring on their finger, to remind them and their environment of their commitment to their wives, and to avoid misunderstandings and unpleasantness.”

== Published works ==
- Bein Hazemanim - "Culture and Recreation in Jewish Law and Thought," Petah Tikva: Orot Shaul and Yediot Aharonot Publishers, 2012. ISBN 9789655455137
- Parsha Ketana - Small Tastes from Parshat Hashavua, Magid Publishing, 2014.
- Avo Beitecha - responsa on the subject of relationships and family, Magid Publishing, 2017. Written together with his son, Rabbi Avraham Stav.
