= Avraham Stav =

Israeli rabbi and author

Rabbi Dr. Avraham Stav (Hebrew: אברהם סתיו; born September 11, 1986) is an Israeli rabbi, author, and publicist. He deals with Jewish literature, particularly in the fields of Halacha, Talmud, and philosophy, and holds a PhD in Jewish Philosophy.

== Biography ==
Avraham Stav was born in Jerusalem to Avivah and Rabbi David Stav. He spent his formative years in Bnei Darom, Antwerp, and Shoham. He studied at the Darchei Noam Yeshiva High School in Petah Tikva, Yeshivat Yeruham, Yeshivat Har Etzion, and its adjacent high-level Kollel, and was ordained as a rabbi. He served in the IDF in the Artillery Corps. He completed his undergraduate degree at Herzog College, and his master's degree in Israeli Thought at Ben-Gurion University of the Negev (with distinction). His doctoral thesis titled "The Prayer of Request and its Influence in Jewish Philosophy in Spain and Provence in the Middle Ages," under the supervision of Prof. Haim Kreisel and Prof. Shalom Sadik, was approved in March 2022.

He teaches at the Neve Hanna Ulpana. In the past, he taught at Yeshivat Har Etzion, Yeshivat Machanayim, and Midreshet Migdal Oz.

Over the years, Rabbi Stav has published several Halachic, Talmudic, and philosophical books, as well as numerous articles in Torah journals such as Tehumin, Asif, Tzohar, Assia, Emunat Itecha, Ma'alin Bakodesh, Hama'ayan, Sinai, and more, and academic articles on platforms like Sidra and AJS. Some of his works were co-authored with his father, Rabbi David Stav.

He was an editor of the lessons of Rabbi Eliyahu Blumenthal on the laws of Shmita, edited his father's book "Bein Hazmanim" and Rabbi Amnon Bazak's book "Nitzachoni Bani." He serves as a researcher at the Tzohar Rabbinical Organization and edited several of its publications. Previously, he was an editor at Rabbi Yosef Tzvi Rimon's Sulamot organization.

He has a regular cultural critique column in the Motzash magazine of the Makor Rishon newspaper. He also occasionally publishes articles on websites such as Arutz 7, Kipa, ynet, and more. He frequently posts on his personal Facebook account. As of August 2023, he has about 9,200 followers and is considered a social media personality among the religious-nationalist community.

== Personal life ==
Stav is married to Batya, the eldest daughter of Rabbi Rafi Feuerstein, and is the father of six children. During their engagement he co-authored with his wife the Torah anthology "Bat Kol" on Masechet Sotah. The couple also co-authored an illustrated book on the laws of the Shmita year for children. They reside in the Gevaot settlement in Gush Etzion.

== Books ==
- Ke'chalom Ya'uf - presents a Halachic and spiritual approach to dealing with pregnancy loss. Following its publication, Stav became active in this field, writing and lecturing.
- Mibayit L'Parochet - is a scholarly, Halachic, and conceptual examination of the laws of the Yom Kippur service. He wrote this book with his father.
- Avo Beit'cha - (two volumes), also written with his father, in Torah journals, they presented a series of Halachic and conceptual studies on family law, modesty, sexuality, and more.
- Tzemichonut Yehudit (Jewish vegetarianism) - contains two sections – thought and Halacha – in which sixteen issues relating to the status of animals in Judaism, their use, sacrificial offerings, vegetarianism and veganism, cultured meat, and more are clarified. The book received letters of blessing and approval from rabbis Eliezer Melamed and Moshe Tzuriel.
