= Shlomo Amar =

Sephardic Chief Rabbi of Israel and Jerusalem (Rishon LeZion)

Rabbi Shlomo Moshe Amar שלמה משה עמר
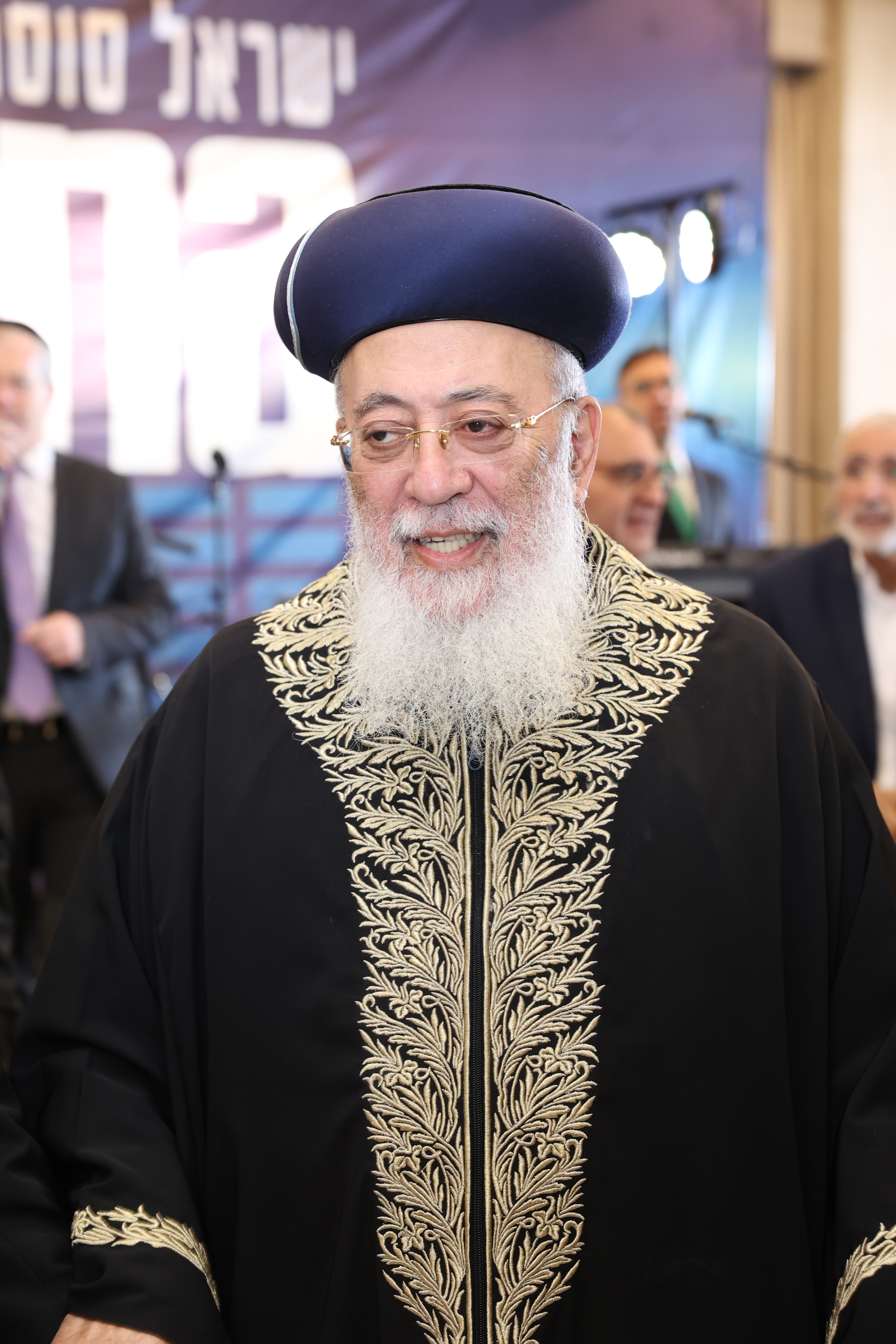
- Rishon LeZion Rabbi Shlomo Moshe Amar
- Title: Rishon LeZion Chief Rabbi of Israel Chief Rabbi of Jerusalem

Personal life
- Born: Shlomo Moshe Amar; April 1, 1948 (age 78) Casablanca, French Morocco
- Spouse: Mazal Amar
- Parent(s): Eliyahu Amar and Mima (Miriam) Amar

Religious life
- Religion: Judaism
- Denomination: Orthodox

Jewish leader
- Predecessor: Eliyahu Bakshi-Doron, Shalom Messas
- Successor: Yitzchak Yosef
- Residence: Jerusalem

Rabbi Shlomo Moshe Amar (Hebrew: הרב שלמה משה עמר; Arabic: سليمان موسى عمار; born April 1, 1948) is the former Sephardic Chief Rabbi of Israel. He served in the position of Rishon LeZion from 2003 to 2013; his Ashkenazi counterpart during his tenure was Yona Metzger. In 2014 he became the Sephardic Chief Rabbi of Jerusalem.

== Early life ==
Amar was born in Casablanca, Morocco, to Eliyahu and Mima (Miriam) Amar. His family immigrated to Israel in 1962 when he was 14. He studied in the Ponovezh Yeshiva. He transferred to a small Yeshiva in the northern town of Shlomi, where at age 19, was appointed the rabbi of the town. At age 20 he also served as the head of kashrut for the city of Nahariyya.

Amar studied dayanut in Haifa under Rabbi Yaakov Nissan Rosenthal. Amar was a close associate and student of the spiritual leader of the Shas party and former Sephardi Chief Rabbi, Ovadia Yosef. Before his appointment as Sephardic Chief Rabbi of Israel, Amar had served as the head of the Petah Tikva Rabbinical Court. He was elected chief rabbi of Tel Aviv in 2002, the first sole Chief Rabbi of the city.

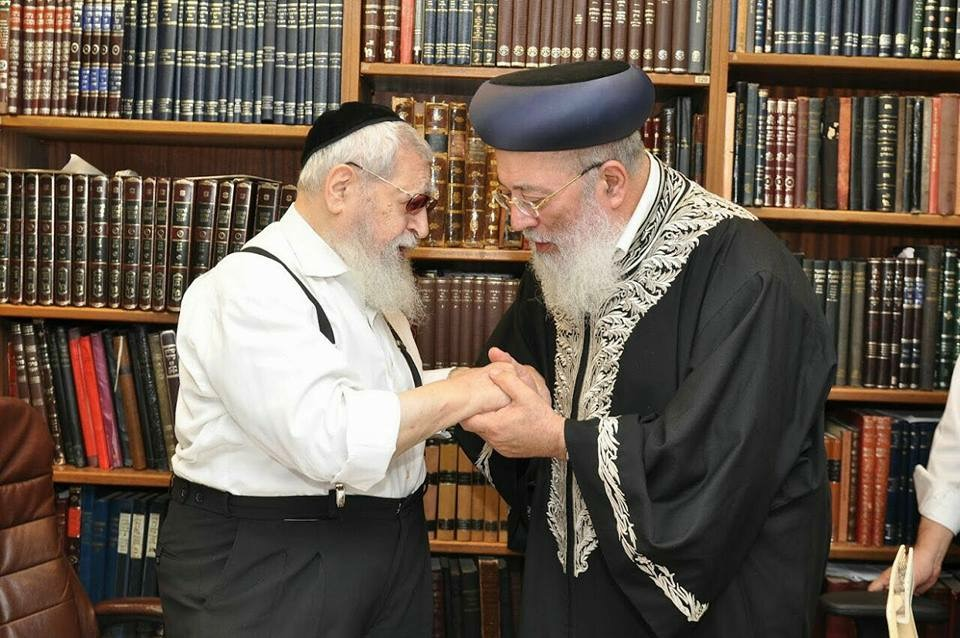
Rabbi Shlomo Amar visiting Rabbi Ovadia Yosef

== Personal life ==
Shlomo and his wife, Mazal Sabag, have 12 children. His daughter Yehudit Rachel is married to Rabbi Ovadia Yosef, the son of Sephardic Chief Rabbi Yitzchak Yosef, and grandson of Ovadia Yosef.

== Sephardic Chief Rabbi of Israel ==
As the former Rishon LeZion, Amar serves as the spiritual leader of the Sephardic community in the Land of Israel. Jews from around the world continue to look to him as a leader.

=== Work with "Lost Tribes" ===
Shlomo Amar worked heavily to bring the Falash Mura to Israel, and stated "that anyone related to a member of Beta Israel through matrilineal descent qualified as Jewish should be brought to Israel by the government". In January 2004, following the recommendations of the Knesset and the Chief Rabbis, Ariel Sharon announced a plan (still largely unimplemented) to bring all of the Falash Mura (presently close to 18,000) to Israel by the end of 2007. He stated in 2008,“We are all culpable, and we are all to blame for not bringing Ethiopia’s Jewry home (reference to the Falash Mura) with the rest of the Jewish people,” said Rabbi Amar, following a heated debate concerning governmental policy towards Ethiopian immigrants. “No amount of heartfelt words can change that fact.” More recently, Shlomo Amar has ruled that descendants of Ethiopian Jews who were forced to convert to Christianity are "unquestionably Jews in every respect". With the consent of Ovadia Yosef, Amar ruled that it is forbidden to question the Jewishness of this community, pejoratively called Falash Mura.

=== Bnei Anusim ===
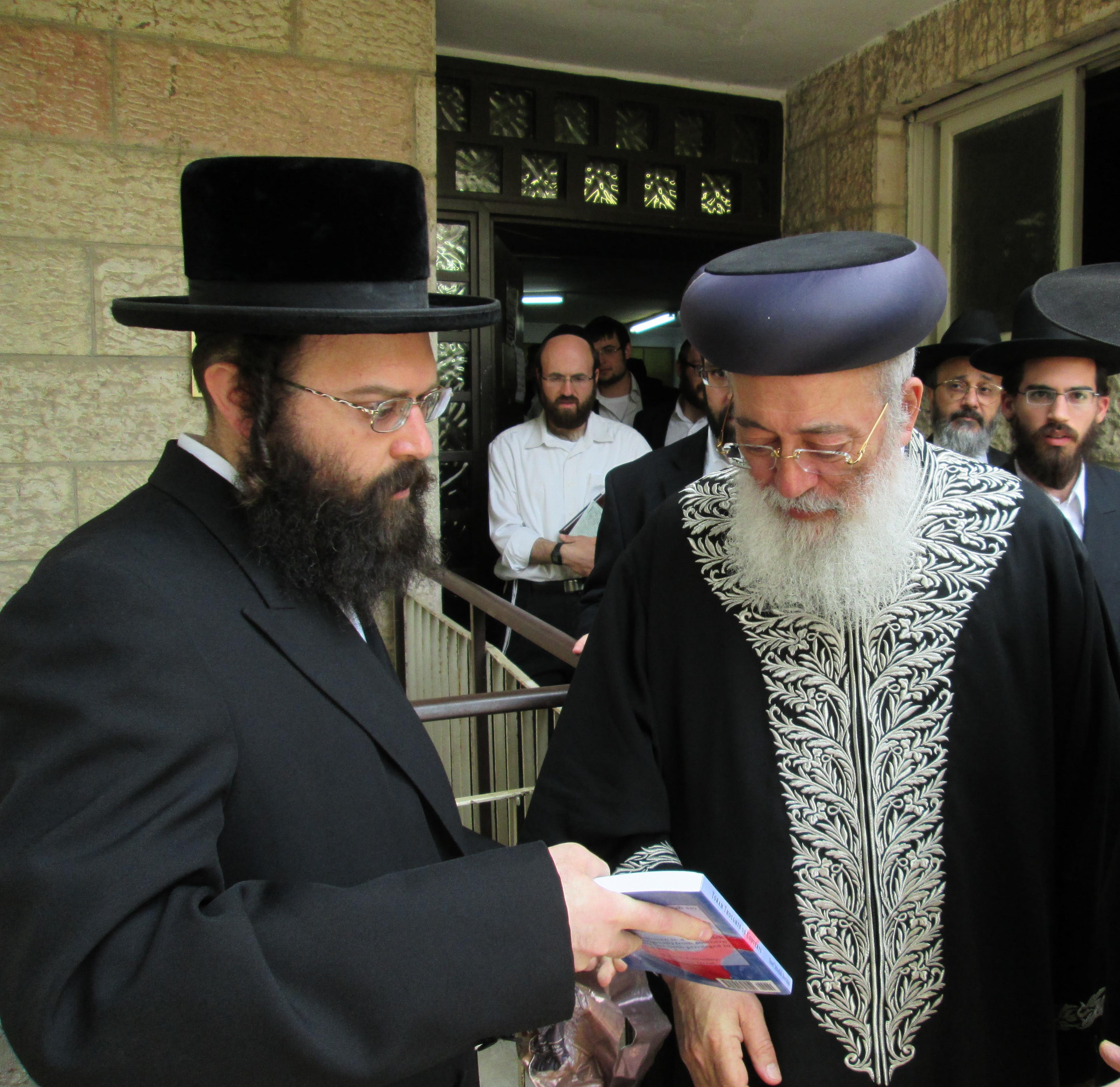
Amar (right) with Jewish author Joseph J. Sherman

In 2004, Amar traveled to Portugal to celebrate the centennial anniversary of the Lisbon synagogue Shaare Tikvah. During his stay, Amar met descendants of Jewish families persecuted by the Inquisition who still practice Judaism (Bnei Anusim) at the house of Rabbi Boaz Pash. A meeting between a Chief Rabbi and Portuguese Marranos (Bnei Anusim) had not happened in centuries. Amar promised to create a committee to evaluate the halakhic status of the community. Due to the delay of the committee to do any work a second community in Lisbon, Comunidade Judaica Masorti Beit Israel, was later established to ensure the recognition of the Bnei Anusim as Jews.

=== Civil marriage proposal ===
Rav Amar made news in September 2005 when he told a Shinui MK that he was willing to support civil marriages for non-Jews and people who are unaffiliated with a religion. Amar pointed out the difference between his idea and that of his predecessor, Eliyahu Bakshi-Doron, who had proposed civil marriage for anyone interested in 2004. Amar's plan, by comparison, would only apply to the marriage of non-Jews with each other. Amar stated that his suggestion was designed to solve the problem of Israel's 300,000 religionless, non-Jewish immigrants, many from the former Soviet Union who claim Jewish identity and citizenship, but whose Jewish status may not be accepted by Orthodox standards and the Chief Rabbinate. Amar called on representatives of the non-Jewish immigrants to discuss the matter with representatives of the rabbinate.

=== Amending the Law of Return ===
In November 2006, Amar submitted a draft bill to Prime Minister Ehud Olmert that would remove the conversion clause from the Israeli Law of Return. This would prevent converts from all streams of Judaism, including Orthodox Judaism, from having automatic citizenship rights in Israel, and restrict the Law of Return to applying only to Jews by birth whose mothers were Jewish. This also affects potential immigrants who are descended from only one Jewish parent or grandparent, not all of whom would be accepted as Jewish under Orthodox law.

Amar said in interviews that the bill was designed to prevent "a situation where there are two peoples in the State of Israel". Amar said the Law of Return's inclusion of converts had turned the conversion process into a political, rather than religious, exercise, and that many people were converting for immigration purposes, not out of sincere religiosity. Amar suggested that an alternative could be that converts, upon arriving in Israel, went through a naturalization process via the Citizenship Law. The bill also gives rabbinic courts and the Chief Rabbinate sole authority over conversions.

Amar said that the bill was partially written in response to the Israeli Supreme Court deliberating a dozen petitions by the Israeli Reform movement to allow Reform converts to stay in Israel. Jews converted under Reform or Conservative auspices abroad have been accepted under the Law of Return since 1989, but the 2006 case deals with conversions that occurred in Israel. Amar argued that if the Reform converts were permitted to stay in the country, they would eventually become frustrated with their inability to marry Jews (as the Chief Rabbinate would not recognize their conversions as valid), and this would lead to them marrying non-Jews, which would polarize the state.

Amar received some criticism from the Reform and Conservative movements in Israel and America, and various Israeli politicians and government figures, including Menachem Mazuz, Yossi Beilin, and UTJ MK Avraham Ravitz, who said he did not believe Amar's bill, if passed, would stop Reform or Conservative converts from receiving citizenship, which would lead back to the initial problem of "two peoples" in Israel. He added that Amar's proposed bill would constitute blatant discrimination against converts. Other commentators noted that the citizenship process for non-Jews can be long and arduous, and pointed out that there are presently many naturalized Israelis, particularly immigrants from the former Soviet Union, who do not meet the halakhic definition of a Jew. One report, challenging Amar's claim that his bill was meant as a preventative measure, wrote, "The 'division of the Jewish people in Israel' is a present reality, not a future possibility."

However, some in Israel's legal community-supported separating religious conversion from the secular citizenship process. Amar also received support from several religious politicians such as NRP MK Zevulun Orlev, who said the bill would protect Jewish unity.

== Sephardic Chief Rabbi of Jerusalem ==
In October 2014, after Jerusalem had gone 11 years without a chief rabbi (following the death of Jerusalem's Chief Rabbi Shalom Messas), Amar was elected as the Sephardic Chief Rabbi of Jerusalem alongside Ashkenazi chief rabbi Aryeh Stern. Amar had the support of both Jerusalem's mayor Nir Barkat and The Jewish Home's chairman Naftali Bennett. Amar has a close relationship with Jerusalem's current mayor Moshe Lion.

== Interfaith relations ==
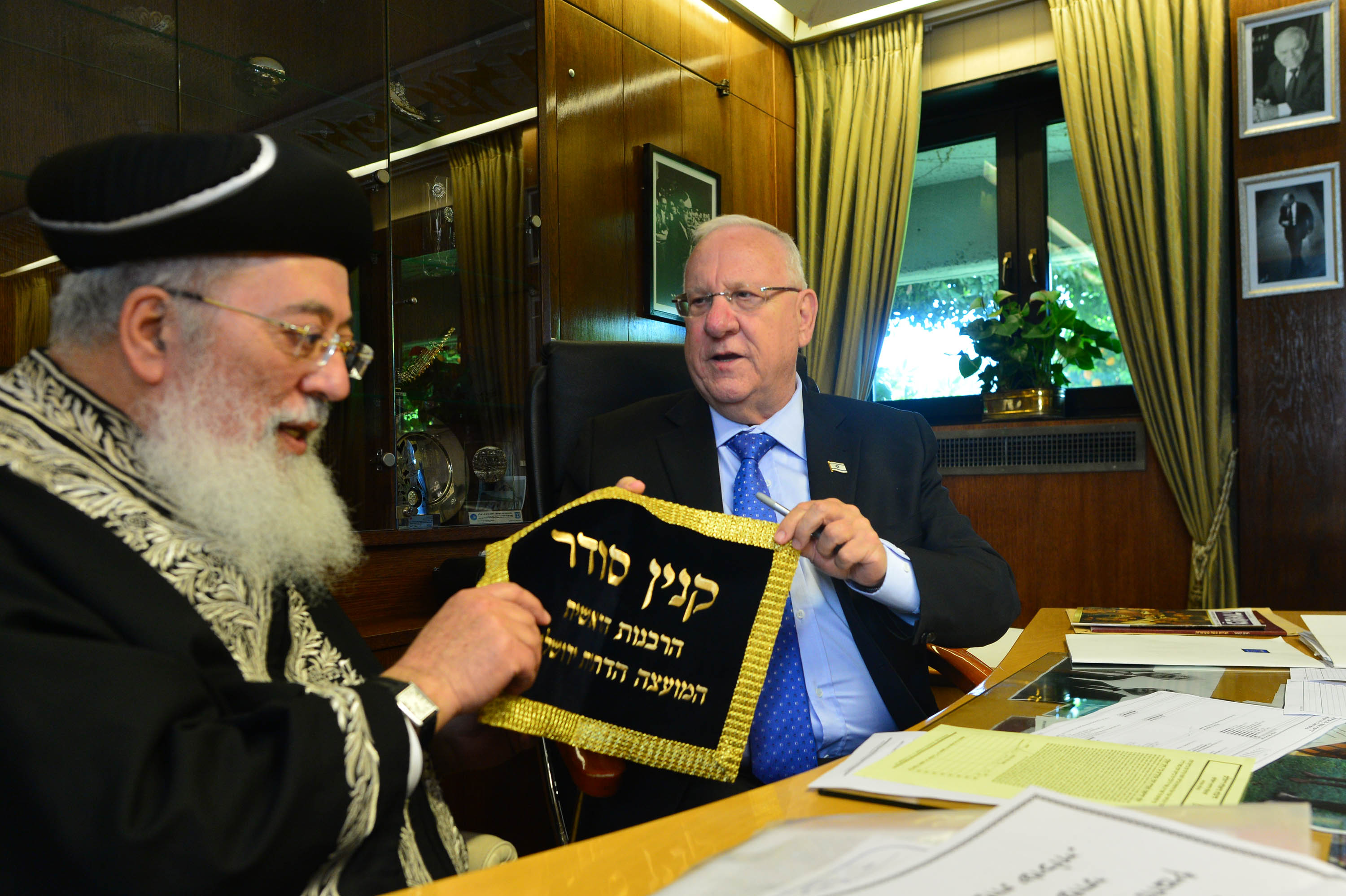
Reuven Rivlin, then President of Israel, sells the leaven of his official home to Amar before Passover, 2016.

In an Arabic-written letter addressed to the Muslim scholar Yusuf Qaradawi, Amar criticized Pope Benedict XVI's remarks on Islam, stating: "Our way is to honour every religion and every nation according to their paths, as it is written in the book of prophets: 'Because every nation will go in the name of its Lord.'" He later told Benedict that it was his duty to spread the message that the Jewish people belong in the Land of Israel.

In April 2015, Amar said he had a "stomach churning" reaction to rabbi Shlomo Riskin's creation of the "Day to Praise" which calls Christians and Jews to recite the Jewish Hallel prayer together on Israel's Independence Day.

In December 2019 he visited Bahrain for an interfaith event, where he met Bahraini king Hamad bin Isa Al Khalifa and religious leaders from Qatar, Kuwait, Jordan, Lebanon, Egypt, Russia, the United States, Italy, India, and Thailand.

== Controversy and criticism ==
Amar has faced heavy criticism over his comments on LGBT issues. In November 2016, he stated in an interview with the Israel Hayom newspaper that homosexuality was a "cult of abominations," and that it is "punishable by death" according to the Torah. In July 2019, he stated that LGBT people "cannot be religious" and endorsed sexual conversion therapy. In June 2021, he described the annual Jerusalem LGBT Pride Parade as "the abomination parade".

In September 2017, he stated that followers of Reform Judaism "shout about Holocaust deniers in Iran, but they deny more than Holocaust deniers" in response to petitions demanding that the Israeli government build a mixed-gender prayer site at the Western Wall in Jerusalem.

== Other activity ==
In 2013 he was given the highest royal honor by the King of Morocco, Mohammed VI. In 2014 Amar met with King Juan Carlos I of Spain and in April 2015 he was invited to meet with King Felipe VI of Spain at the Zarzuela Palace in Madrid, Spain to discuss Spanish citizenship for Sephardic Jews.

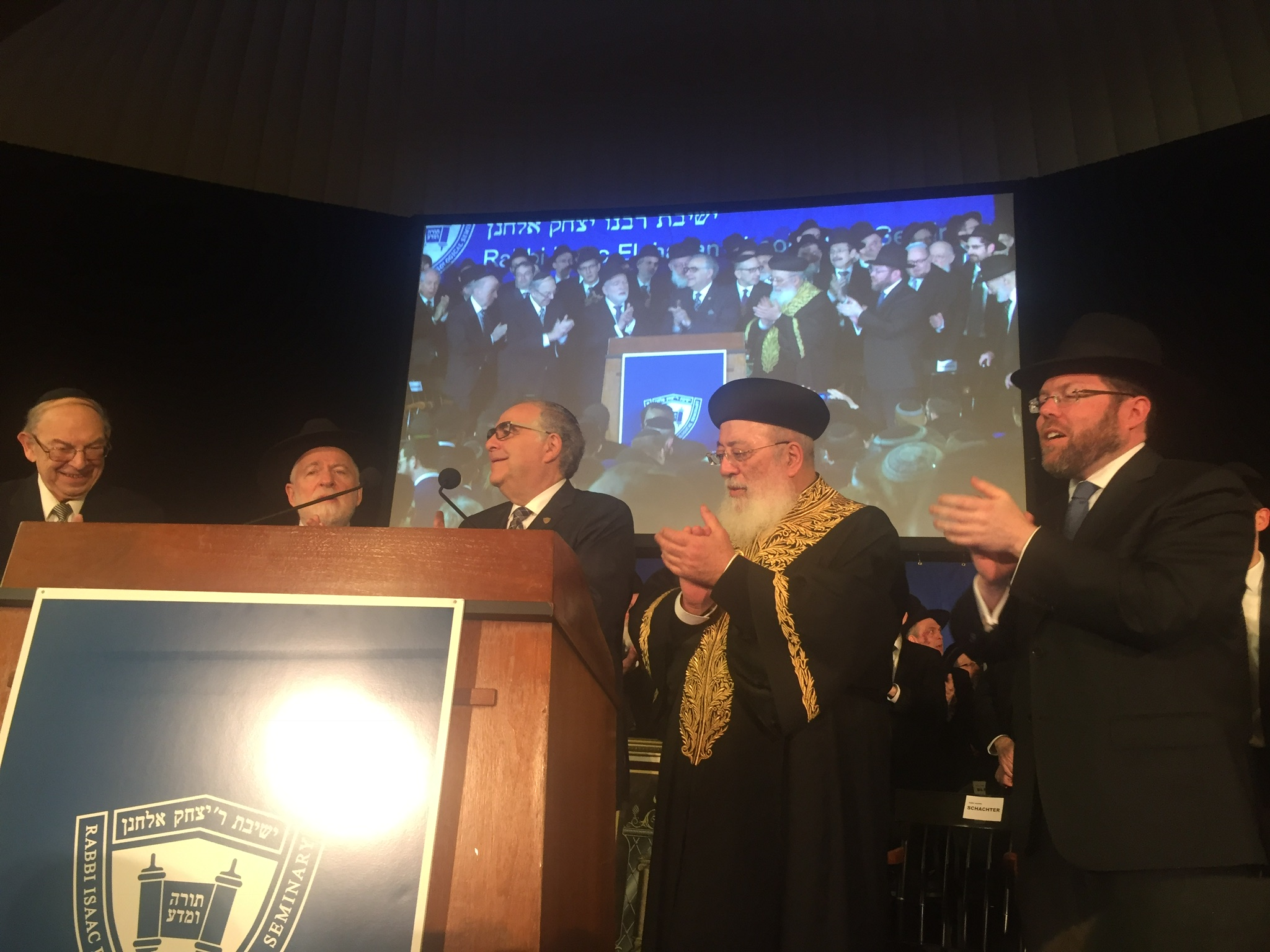
Amar at Yeshiva University Chag HaSemikha

Amar played a major role in comforting French Jews after the Charlie Hebdo shootings of 2015. He maintains a close relationship with the French community and Chief Rabbi of France, Haïm Korsia.

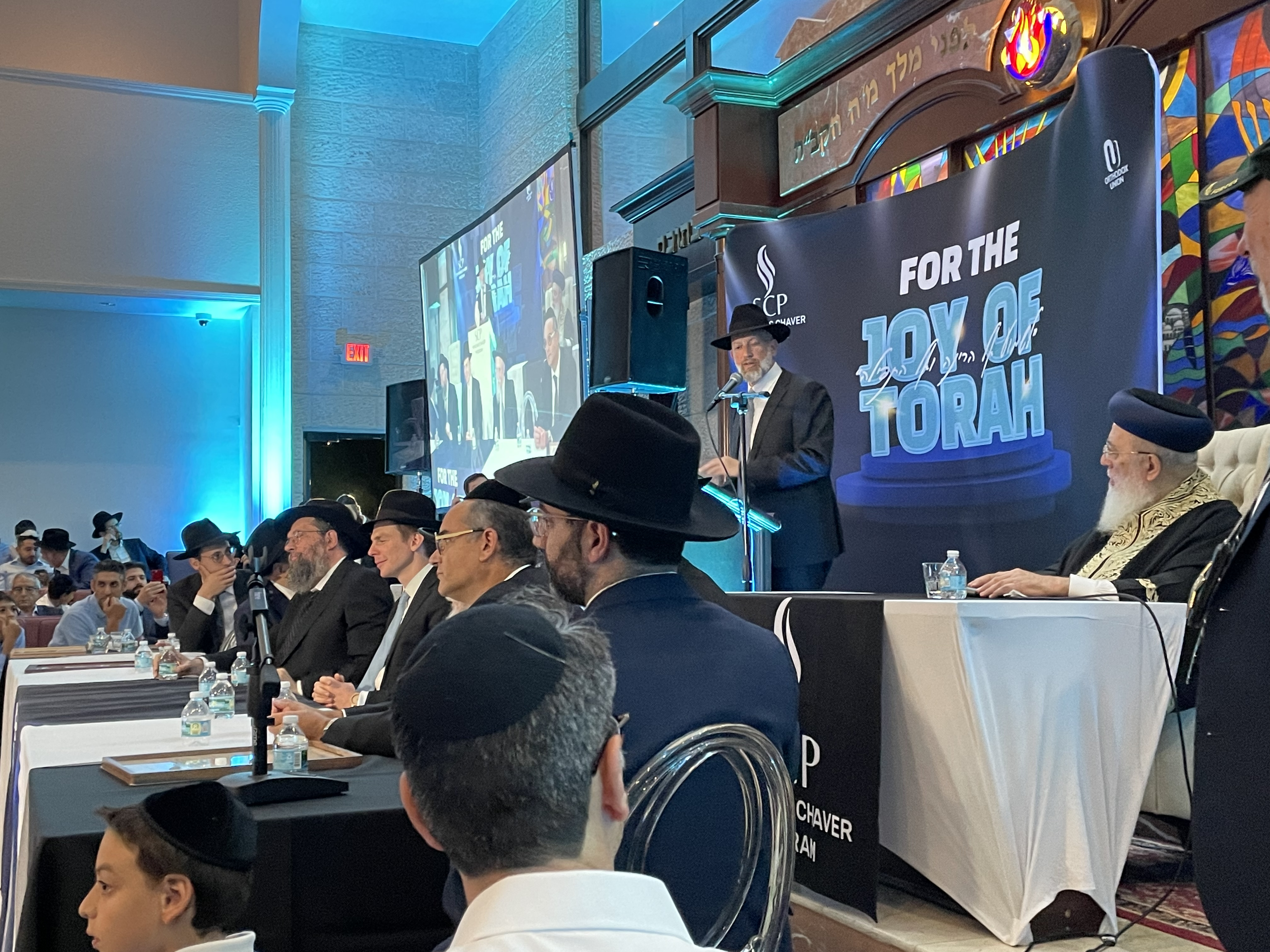
Amar at the Semichas Chaver Program celebration

== Published works ==
- Among Amar's earliest work was a detailed commentary on the Torah titled "Birkat Eliyahu" named in honor of his father.
- A set of Amar's responsa have been published, "Shema Shlomo".
- Amar published a work on responsa regarding the commandments and laws specific to the land of Israel titled “Kerem Shlomo”.
- "B’era Shel Miriam" on Kashrut, named in honor of his mother.
- "Miyamim Yemima Haggadah Shel Pesach" a commentary on Haggadah of Pesach.
- "Miyamim Yemima" a commentary on songs and blessings for Shabbat.
- Sefer "Kol Mitzalot Chatanim", responsa on chuppah, ketubah and the Jewish marriage ceremony.

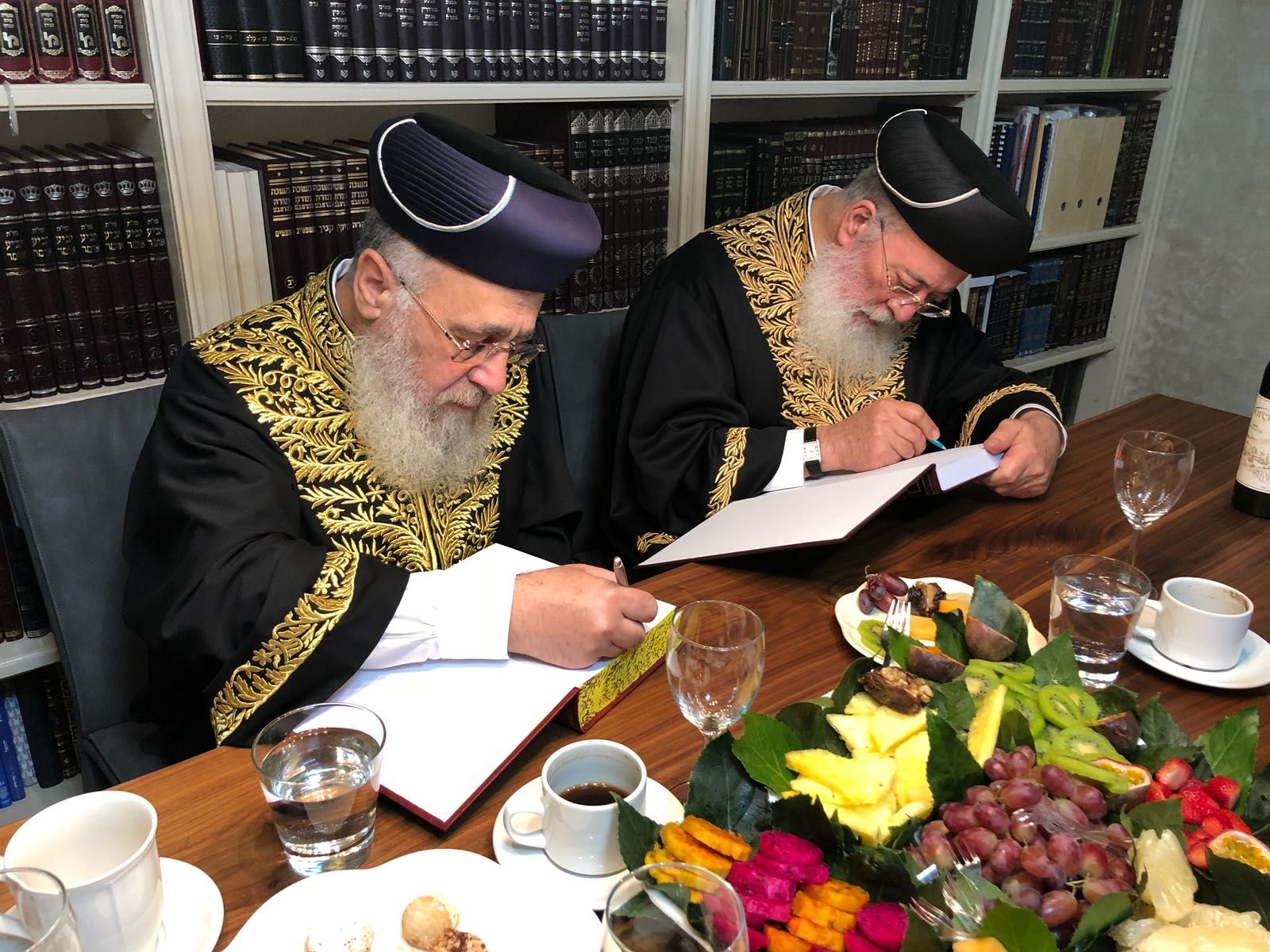

Jewish titles
Preceded by Eliyahu Bakshi Doron	Sephardi Chief Rabbi of Israel; 2003–2013	Succeeded by Yitzhak Yosef
