= Yeshivat Hesder Petah Tikva =

Yeshivat Orot Shaul (Hebrew: ישיבת אורות שאול), also known as Orot Sha'ul (Hebrew: אורות שאול), is a Hesder Yeshiva located in Tel Aviv. The current Roshei Yeshiva are Rabbi Yuval Cherlow, Rabbi Tamir Granot and Rabbi Itamar Eldar. Established in 1998, it currently has approximately 200 students, of whom 25% are actively serving in the IDF.

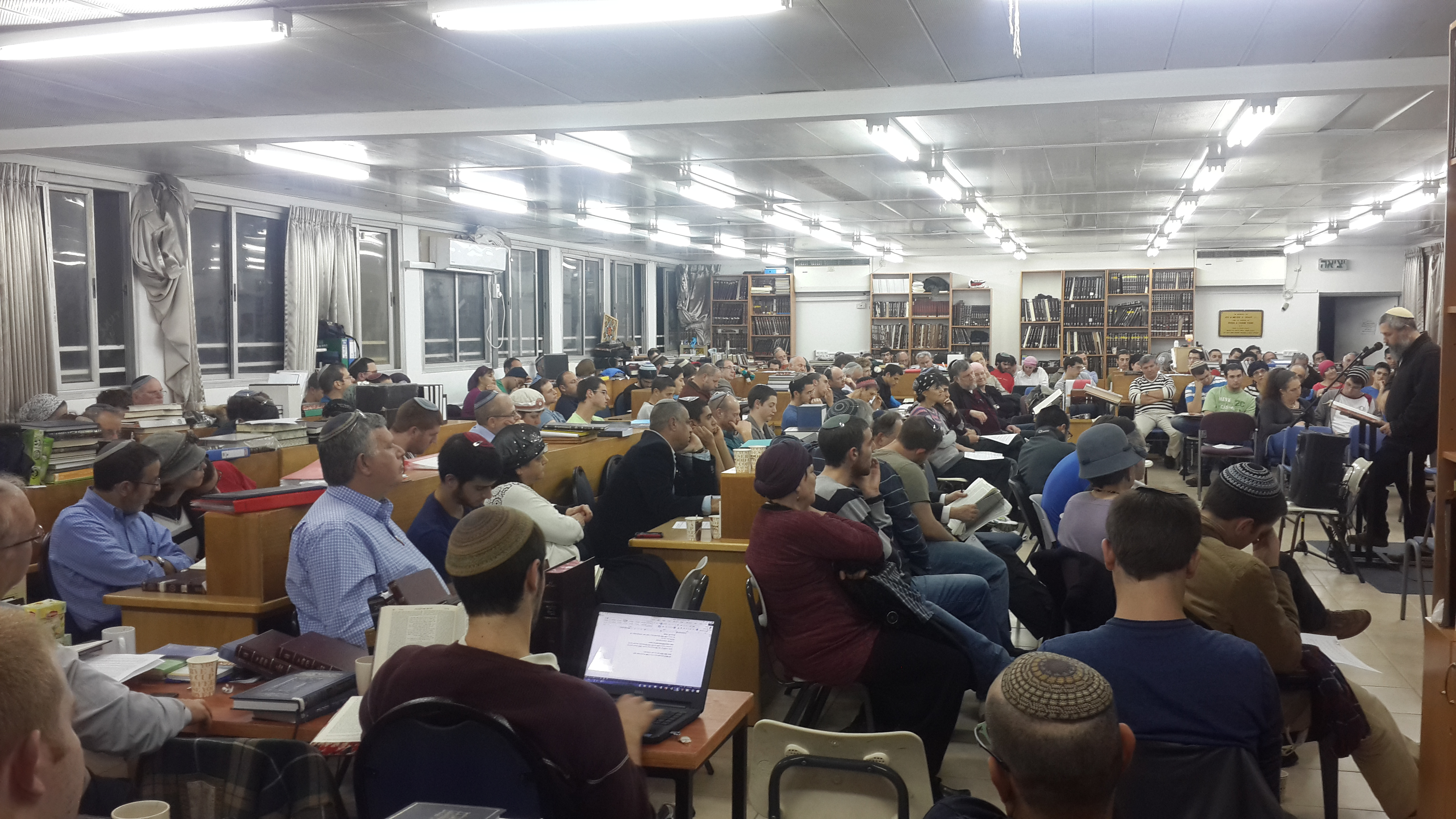
Evening study session

== History ==
Yeshivat Hesder Orot Shaul was established by Rabbi Yuval Cherlow, Rabbi David Stav, and Rabbi Shai Piron, founders of the Tzohar Foundation, a moderate Orthodox organization that promotes ties between religious and secular Jews in Israel. The yeshiva, which embraces a modern Orthodox educational philosophy, combines Torah study with military service.

Orot Shaul is known for its demanding curriculum, and its study hall can be found fully occupied into the latest hours of the night. For this reason, Orot Shaul has instituted rigorous entrance exams in order to ensure that its prospective students can meet its demanding 5-year program.

Its students have served in some of the Israel Defense Forces' most elite units, ranging from intelligence to combat.

The yeshiva is notable within the Dati Leumi world for its combination of traditional Talmudic study and openness to Hasidic teachings.
