= Joseph J. Sherman =

American marketing strategist and artist

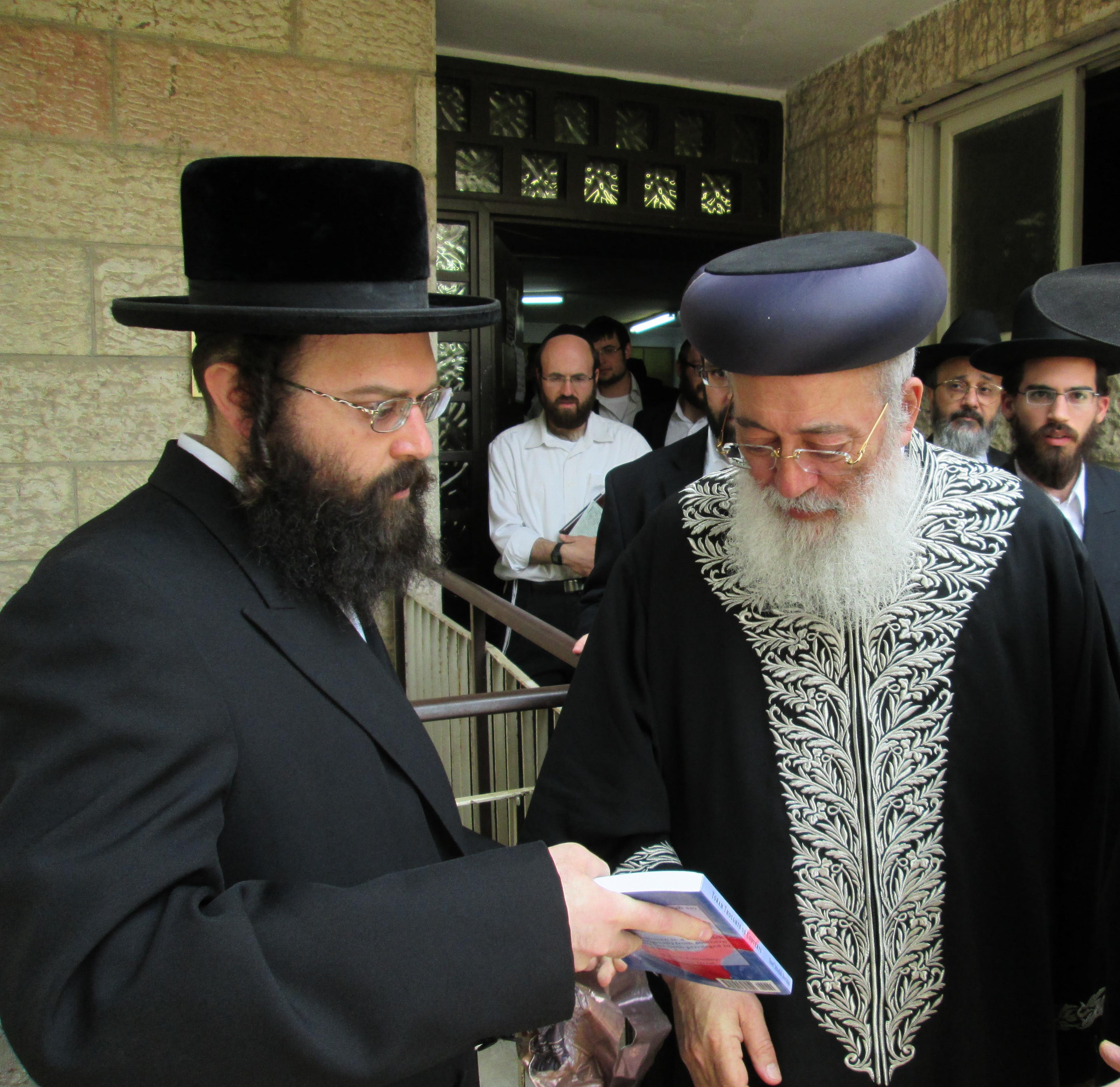
- Chief Rabbi Shlomo Amar (right) with Joseph J. Sherman in Jerusalem
- Born: Anaheim, California
- Education: University of California, San Diego; KEDGE Business School, France
- Occupations: Businessperson, artist

Joseph J. Sherman is an American marketing strategist and artist.

== Early life ==
Sherman was born in Anaheim, California, and was raised in Riverside, California. At the age of 10 he spoke at a public hearing regarding noise pollution at Riverside Municipal Airport. Sherman wrote and delivered his own speech to city council members explaining that it was hard to do homework with airplanes constantly flying overhead, and that more airplanes would make studying more difficult. At the age of 11. he was team captain of his elementary school's KidQuiz team, a Saturday morning children's game show on CBS2 in Los Angeles. At the age of 16 he was recruited by the University of California to participate in a young scientists research program. At this program Sherman worked in a National Institutes of Health-sponsored laboratory developing neurotransmitter sensors for brain research. He was a leader in his high school's Key Club.

== Education ==
Sherman studied at The University of California, San Diego and served on the UCSD Diversity Council. Sherman studied under anthropologist Charles L. Briggs He lectured about The Legitimization of Terrorism. Sherman was a resident at The International House (I-House) on Eleanor Roosevelt College, and studied abroad at The University of Göttingen in Germany. Sherman has studied at the Monterrey Institute of Technology and Higher Education in Mexico and received a fellowship from the University of California, Berkeley. Sherman has Non-Profit Management Certification from Duke University.

Sherman completed his MBA at Ecole Supérieure de Commerce de Marseille-Provence (KEDGE Business School) in Marseille, France. He wrote a book on Euro-Mediterranean Corporate Financial Structures based on his research at Kedge. He was an eMBA exchange student at Shanghai Jiao Tong University in China.

== Personal life ==
Sherman is a convert to Judaism. He lectures about his conversion and about Torah. He has been featured in Israeli media about his conversion experience, and about his artwork. Mishpacha magazine describes how people could not believe that the man in a beard, peyot, and traditional long black coat was once the gentile buying the chametz from Jerusalem's Beth Din before Passover. The Orthodox Union described Sherman as "originally an Evangelical Christian youth minister who began to question religion as a teenager. Follow his journey around the world where he studied neuroscience and business until today settled in Israel as a Jew heavily involved in Israel advocacy".

== Art ==
Jerusalem Online News, a subsidiary of Channel 2, describes how Sherman's art is inspired by Judaism. "As part of the Kotel (Western Wall) series, Sherman is painting doves of peace and other beautiful birds flying over the skyline of the Kotel... Sherman artistically portrays the vibrant celebrations that occur at Jewish weddings that take place beside the remnants of the ancient Temple in Jerusalem."

Via the Holocaust Art Institute, Sherman has donated paintings in memory of The Righteous Among the Nations to The Embassy of the Republic of Croatia in the State of Israel, The Serbian Embassy in Israel, The Slovak Embassy in Israel, The Embassy of Belgium in Israel, The Embassy of Hungary in Tel-Aviv, and The Austrian Cultural Forum Tel Aviv.

Greek Diplomat Alexandros Yennimatas has noted that "“Through his work, Mr. Sherman reminds us all that both creation and destruction are inherently human notions that transcend all forms of social divisions... Mr. Sherman’s resolve to promote the cause of peace and fraternity among peoples stands as a beacon of hope in these difficult times.”

== Business career ==
Sherman works in business development, sales, and marketing with tech start-ups and scale-ups. Sherman has been profiled and cited for his business advice by The Harvard Business Review, The University of North Carolina at Chapel Hill and Inc. Magazine.
