= Hashgacha Pratit (organization) =

Israel-based Organization with both female and male clergy

Hashgacha Pratit (השגחה-פרטית) is an independent, Israel-based organization with both female and male clergy that self-describes as providing an alternative form of Orthodox Rabbinical authority and social activism group dedicated to challenging the monopoly of the Chief Rabbinate of Israel over religious ceremonies and practices, through the provision of private religious ceremonies. Founded in 2012 by Rabbi Aaron Leibowitz in Jerusalem, Israel, it offers alternative halachic services in life-cycle events, rabbinical training, and other courses in religious education. It has provided private kashrut supervision for restaurants, worked on raising public awareness and finding loopholes in the laws to circumvent the Chief Rabbinate's monopoly, first regarding Kashrut, by leading the movement to open the kosher food market to competition, and today regarding Orthodox wedding ceremonies.

The term “Hashgacha Pratit” means “Divine providence,” but can also be translated to mean “private supervision,” a pun on the private organization's halachic kashrut supervision.

== Background ==
In Israel, the Chief Rabbinate holds a monopoly on religious services such as conversion, marriage, divorce, and kashrut. In 2017, only 20% of the public said they trusted the Chief Rabbinate. By 2012, some organizations started to provide religious services outside the Rabbinate's authority, but there were none dealing with kashrut, except for long-standing Haredi sector bodies such as Edah HaChareidis. The goal of Hashgacha Pratit is not to bring down the Rabbinate, but rather to provide an alternative for restaurants and their customers who want truly kosher food without the corruption they claim is practiced by the Rabbinate.

=== Kashrut ===
Many Jews who observe kashrut only eat in restaurants which have a certificate on the wall declaring that the establishment's food is kosher and supervised by a mashgiach. In Israel, the Chief Rabbinate has the exclusive authority to grant a certification that an establishment is kosher. In 2015, 79% of Israeli Jews said they were in favor of ending the Rabbinate's monopoly over kashrut certification.

In 2012, Rabbi Aaron Leibowitz founded Hashgacha Pratit and they began to form relationships with establishments that wanted a way around the Rabbinate's supervision, which could be corrupt due to lack of competition.

By 2016, 27 restaurants around the country were associated with Hashgacha Pratit. In June 2016, 2 restaurants associated with Hashgacha Pratit brought the Chief Rabbinate to the Israel Supreme Court, which ruled against the restaurant owners. The court decision greatly limited their ability to certify kashrut, forbidding their certificates from using the words “kosher,” “halacha,” “in accordance with Jewish law,” “hashgacha” (supervision), and any words “having associations with kashrut.”

In 2017, Rabbi Oren Duvdevani, a reputable Orthodox Kashrut expert, joined the organization as head of kashrut supervision. Public awareness spread and restaurants and patrons came to understand that a Hashgacha Pratit certificate is valid in accordance with Jewish law and began to support the mission of the organization. The organization reworked their certificates to fit the restricted loopholes of the court decision, now calling them “Agreements of Trustworthiness.” They continued to rally support from the public and supervise establishments throughout Israel, still practicing according to Orthodox law. More restaurants, and eventually hotels, switched from Rabbinate to Hashgacha Pratit supervision.

=== Court decision ===
On September 12, 2017, Hashgacha Pratit returned to the Supreme Court with over 50 restaurants and the public on their side.

The decision came that the authority to grant kosher certificates still belongs to the Rabbinate, but establishments have the right to present their standards of kashrut. The Supreme Court ruled that the “Law Against Kashrut Fraud” is to ensure kosher food being presented properly. The president of the Supreme Court, Miriam Naor, stated “A food establishment which does not have a kashrut certificate [from the Rabbinate] cannot present itself as kosher, but this does not prevent it from giving a true presentation in writing which details the standards it observes and the way these standards are inspected.”

=== Standards ===
Hashgacha Pratit is committed to Orthodox halachic standards of kashrut. Their certification entails that dairy restaurants are completely dairy or pareve, dairy comes from certified kosher milk, all meat in meat restaurants is kosher (i.e. it comes from kosher animals and was properly slaughtered), flour is sifted by kosher processes, and that vegetables are washed in the kosher manner.

Their certificates declare these standards and reads, “The business has committed to making the kitchen, storeroom and any place in the business and its computer systems open to Rabbi Duvdevani and his team at any time they want, without prior arrangement for the purposes of oversight and inspection of the business”

Hashgacha Pratit also employs women as mashgichot, kosher supervisors. Although the Rabbinate has never hired women, there is no halacha stating that women cannot serve as mashgichot.

In March 2018, Hashgacha Pratit passed its kashrut department, and head of department Rabbi Oren Duvdevani, to Tzohar, another alternative Orthodox organization. Tzohar Food Supervision took over the supervision of all businesses associated with Hashgacha Pratit, so that Hashgacha Pratit could move onto other initiatives.

The public has generally responded well to the mission of Hashgacha Pratit, since many communities have long been weary of the danger of the monopoly and the services provided which they felt were substandard. Some rabbis have provided halachic reasons to abolish a monopoly over kashrut.

== Weddings ==
In July 2018, Hashgacha Pratit began a new initiative called Chuppot to offer Orthodox wedding services outside the authority of the Rabbinate. The name comes from the chuppah, the canopy used in a Jewish wedding ceremony, also used to describe the process of a Jewish marriage ceremony. Chuppot was the first organization to provide any couple with halachic Orthodox wedding services outside the framework of the Chief Rabbinate.

Rabbi Aaron Leibowitz, head of Hashgacha Pratit, said about the new weddings initiative, “This attitude is a result of policy, not Jewish law. This policy has led to the public crisis of confidence [in the Chief Rabbinate], and the monopoly of the rabbinate on religious services in the state distances these couples from Judaism.”

=== Processes ===
Eighteen men and women, using the title rabbi, perform the wedding ceremonies that the Hashgacha Pratit organization describes as being Orthodox.

The services are offered to three main groups:

- Immigrants from the former Soviet Union and their children, who identify as Jewish but do not have the documentation to prove it (because of Soviet suppression of religion), and are not recognized as Jewish by the Rabbinate.
- Orthodox converts who are not recognized as Jewish by the Rabbinate.
- Couples who want halachic Orthodox weddings, but refuse on ideological grounds to hold them under the Rabbinate.

The wedding division of Hashgacha Pratit is headed by Rabbi Chuck Davidson. They will accept any couple who says they are Jewish, unless there is reason to doubt them. They will provide wedding services to Orthodox converts, after checking their conversion documents. Couples being married through Chuppot must sign certain documents before their service:

- Declaration that they are both Jewish, not already married, and that the couple does not consist of a Kohen marrying a divorced woman (which is forbidden under halacha).
- Agreement that if they separate, they will pursue a gett, a religious divorce. (This prevents mamzerut, children born through illicit relationships.)
- Halachic prenuptial agreement which sets out financial sanctions if one partner refuses to consent to divorce, preventing the case of agunot, chained women.

In 2013, the Law for Marriage and Divorce said that any couple that does not register their wedding through the Rabbinate, as well as the Rabbi who performs the wedding, is liable to a two-year jail sentence. Hashgacha Pratit claims that this law does not apply to couples who have been refused service by the Rabbinate. They are working to revoke the law in the Knesset.

Many Israeli couples choose to hold civil wedding ceremonies abroad and return home to register their marriage with the Ministry of Interior. The amount of couples opting for this route has increased by up to 4% as the public grows more dissatisfied with the Rabbinate. These couples can also come to Chuppot to perform a religious ceremony when they return to Israel. The Rabbinate cannot interfere because the couples are already legally married.

=== Outreach ===
As with Hashgacha Pratit's kashrut initiative, the goal of Chuppot is not to bring down the Chief Rabbinate, but to provide a better alternative that is less invasive of privacy, less gender discriminatory, and less prohibitive of certain egalitarian elements of the wedding ceremony.

In 2018, Targum Shlishi, a foundation dedicated to creative change in Jewish life worldwide, awarded a grant to help Chuppot market itself to a broader audience in Israel.
