= Tamir Granot =

Israeli Orthodox Jewish rabbi and author

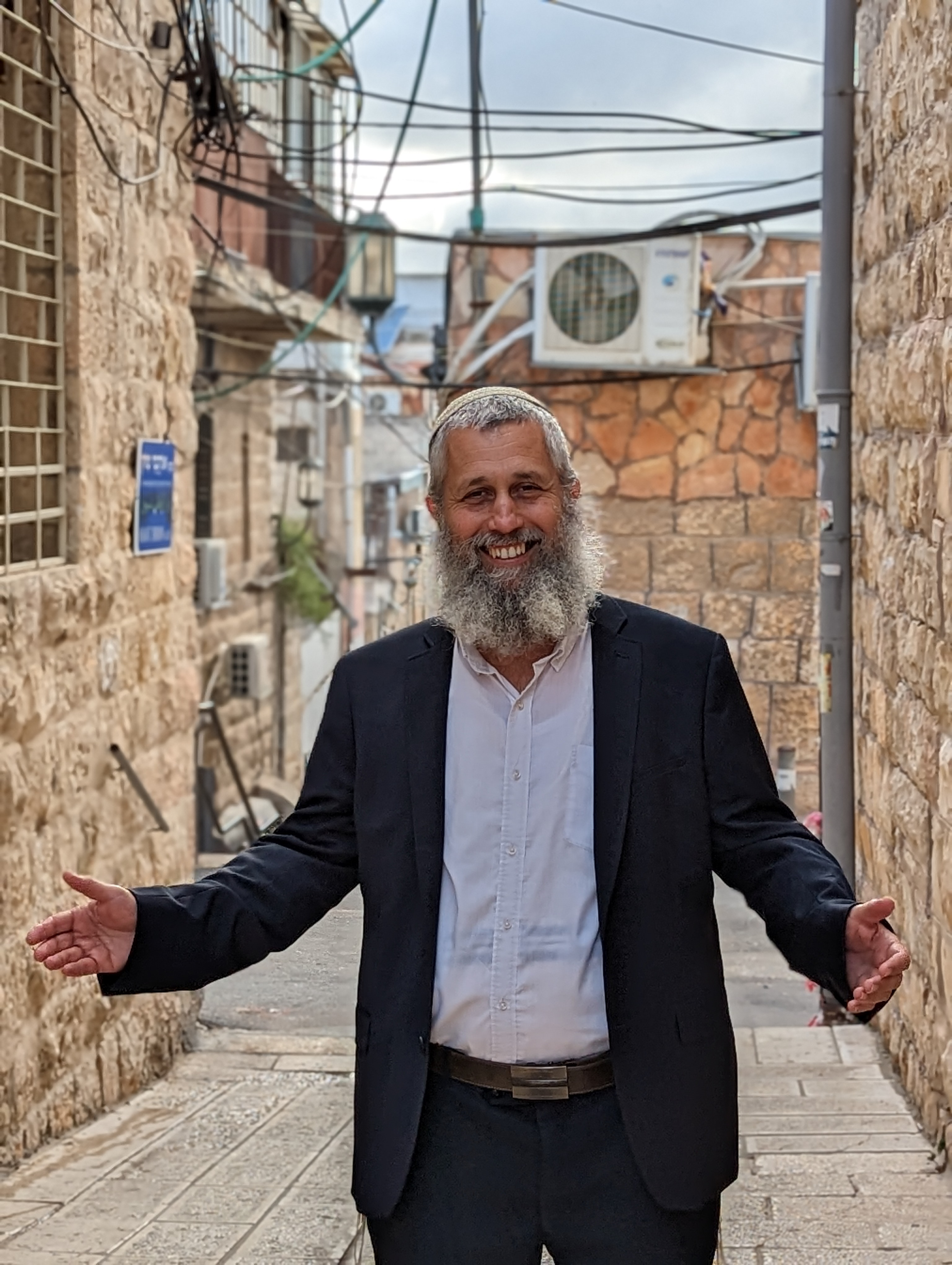
- Granot in Jerusalem

Personal life
- Born: תמיר גרנות; 1970 (age 55–56) Ramat Gan, Israel
- Spouse: Avivit Ben-Yosef
- Children: 1
- Education: Yeshivat Bnei Akiva Netiv Meir, Yeshivat Har Etzion, Herzog College, Hebrew University of Jerusalem

Religious life
- Religion: Judaism
- Denomination: Orthodox Judaism

Jewish leader
- Position: Rosh Yeshiva (dean)
- Yeshiva: Orot Shaul Hesder Yeshiva

Tamir Granot (Hebrew: תמיר גרנות; born 1970) is an Israeli Orthodox Jewish rabbi and author and the Rosh Yeshiva (dean) of Yeshivat Orot Shaul, a hesder yeshiva in southern Tel Aviv.

== Early life and education ==
Granot was born in Ramat Gan and grew up in Kiryat Motzkin. For high school he attended Yeshivat Bnei Akiva Netiv Meir in Jerusalem. Afterwards, he began studying at Yeshivat Har Etzion in Alon Shevut, where he was a student of Rabbi Yehuda Amital and Rabbi Aharon Lichtenstein.

He completed his master's degree in Jewish philosophy at the Hebrew University of Jerusalem, in parallel to his Torah studies, as well as his doctorate, which dealt with the rise of Hasidism after the Holocaust, focusing on Yekusiel Yehudah Halberstam, the Rebbe of Sanz-Klausenburg.

== Career ==
In the late 1990s, Granot began teaching at Herzog College in Alon Shevut and at Lifshitz College of Education in Jerusalem. He has taught gemara and Jewish thought at Midreshet Lindenbaum in Jerusalem and Migdal Oz in Gush Etzion. In 2006 he established the "Beit Midrash for Army Veterans" in Katzrin together with Itamar Alder and Moshe Egozi and, alongside them, headed it for four years. In 2010 Granot founded the communal "Beit Midrash for Torah and Life" in Haspin, which he headed.

In 2013, he became co-rosh yeshiva at the Orot Shaul Hesder Yeshiva.

On March 12, 2024, he delivered a speech about the lack of Haredi (ultra-Orthodox contribution to the Israeli army, a historically controversial issue in Israeli society, "Regarding the Enlistment of Yeshiva Students" During the Gaza war, there has been increased pressure for haredi participation in the army. Yitzhak Yosef, the former Sephardi Chief Rabbi of Israel, wrote, "If [the government] forces us to go to the army, we’ll all move to chutz la'aretz (outside of Israel)". Granot's son had been killed towards the beginning of the war, and the call sought to bridge the gaps between communities, consistent with Granot's work to promote unity among the people of Israel.

== Personal life ==
He is married to Avivit Ben-Yosef, an Israeli educator and author. His son, Amitai Granot, a platoon leader in the 75th Battalion of the IDF's 7th Armored Brigade was killed by a Hezbollah missile attack on an IDF post bordering Lebanon on October 15 during the 2023 Israel-Hezbollah conflict, following the October 7 Hamas-led attack and massacre.
