= Eliyahu Bakshi-Doron =

Israeli rabbi (1941–2020)

Rabbi Eliyahu Bakshi-Doron
- אליהו בקשי-דורון
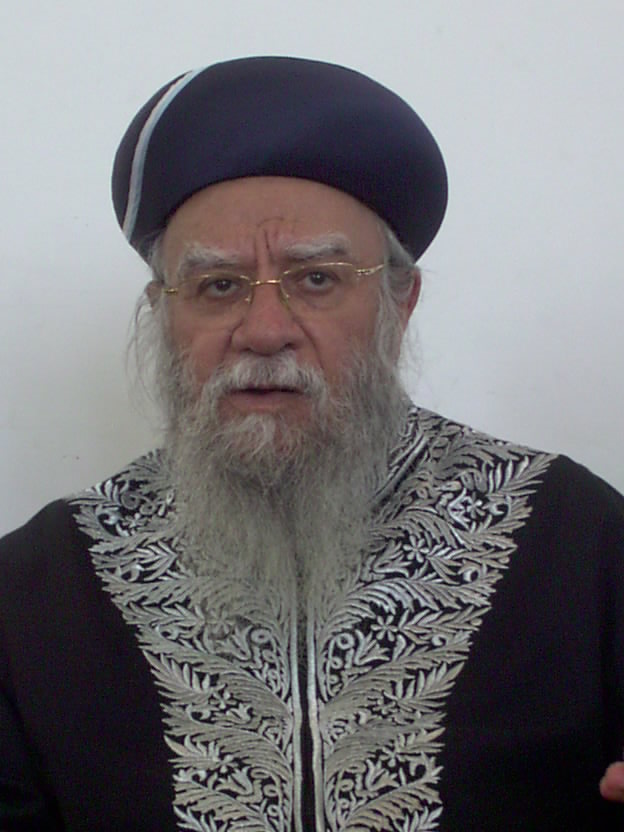

Personal life
- Born: 5 April 1941 Jerusalem, Mandatory Palestine
- Died: 12 April 2020 (aged 79) Jerusalem, Israel
- Spouse: Esther

Religious life
- Religion: Orthodox Judaism
- Denomination: Sephardi

Senior posting
- Period in office: 1993–2003
- Predecessor: Mordechai Eliyahu
- Successor: Shlomo Amar
- Previous post: Sephardi Chief Rabbi of Haifa; Sephardi Chief Rabbi of Israel

Eliyahu Bakshi-Doron (Hebrew: אליהו בקשי דורון; April 5, 1941 – April 12, 2020) was an Israeli rabbi who served as Rishon LeZion (Chief Rabbi of Israel) from 1993 to 2003. Prior to that he served as Sephardi Chief Rabbi of Bat Yam and Sephardi Chief Rabbi of Haifa.

Bakshi-Doron was criticized by Haredi leaders for some of his halakhic (Jewish legal) decisions, and by the Reform movement for his position on assimilation. He was known for his promotion of interfaith dialogue and nonviolence.

== Early life and education ==
Eliyahu Bakshi-Doron was born in Jerusalem to Ben-Zion Bakshi-Doron, a native of the city, and Tova, an immigrant from Aleppo, Syria. He had two brothers and a sister.

As a young man, Eliyahu studied in several prominent yeshivas of the Religious Zionist movement. He continued his education at Yeshivat HaDarom, Hebron Yeshiva, and Kol Ya'akov. During this time he began to think of a rabbinic career, and established relationships with leading halakhic figures Rabbis Yosef Shalom Eliashiv, Bezalel Zolty, and Ovadia Yosef.

== Rabbinic career ==
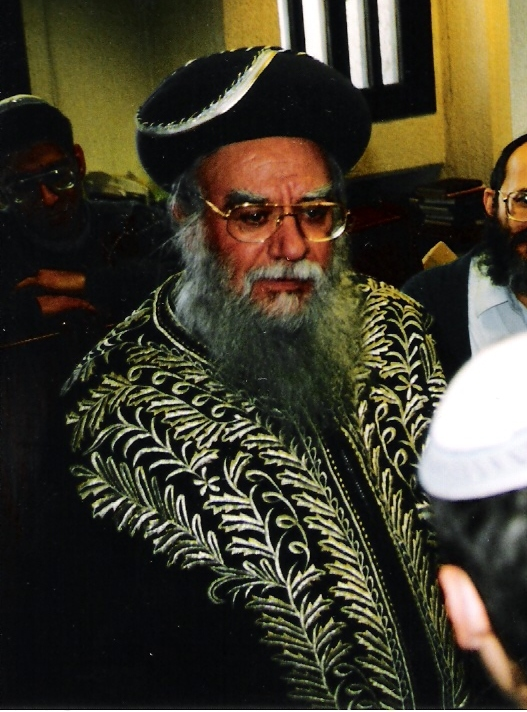
Rabbi Bakshi-Doron in 2007

After his marriage at age 25, Bakshi-Doron was tapped to lead the upper class in Porat Yosef Yeshiva. At age 28 he was appointed Rav of the Ramat Hanasi neighborhood of Bat Yam, becoming the youngest Rav of an Israeli city. Two years after that he was named Sephardi Chief Rabbi of Bat Yam. In 1973, at the age of 34, he was appointed Sephardi Chief Rabbi of Haifa. At the same time he was also named head of the rabbinical courts in the city, which supervised the kashrut of many large, local food factories. Throughout this time he gave public shiurim (Torah lectures) to strengthen the Sephardic community.

=== Sephardi Chief Rabbi of Israel ===
In 1993, Bakshi-Doron became the first Rishon LeZion (Chief Rabbi of Israel) of non-Iraqi extraction since Rabbi Ben-Zion Meir Hai Uziel in 1954. He served his term concurrently with his Ashkenazi counterpart, Rabbi Yisrael Meir Lau.

In a 1996 sermon, Bakshi-Doron compared Reform Judaism to the biblical Zimri, who was killed by Phinehas for cohabitation with a Midianite woman. Bakshi-Doron dismissed the resulting uproar as a publicity stunt, saying it was "unthinkable" that anyone would consider his speech an incitement to murder. In January 1999, Bakshi-Doron stated publicly that the Reform movement had harmed Jews more than had the Holocaust. According to Holocaust historian Yehuda Bauer, in other countries, his statement might be considered criminal incitement and antisemitism.

In 1998, Bakshi-Doron met with Turkish Muslim cleric Fethullah Gulen in Istanbul, Turkey. In 2000, Bakshi-Doron and Lau made headlines when they met with Pope John Paul II. It was later seen as a historical precedent which led the way to the 2005 meeting between Chief Rabbis Shlomo Amar and Yona Metzger with the new Pope, Benedict XVI.

In 2000, while visiting the Jewish community in Singapore, Bakshi-Doron declared that he was in favor of giving away parts of East Jerusalem to the Palestinians as a way to end the Arab–Israeli conflict. He stipulated that any agreement would have to allow for the Temple Mount to remain in Israeli control.

==== Shmita controversy ====
In the sabbatical year of 2000, Bakshi-Doron became involved in a disagreement with some of the leading rabbis in Israel. In order to get around the Jewish legal prohibitions of shmita, in which farmland must lie fallow once every seven years, some Sephardi and Religious Zionist rabbis had allowed the use of the Heter Mechira (land-sale contract), by which farmers could symbolically sell their land to non-Jews for the sabbatical year, thereby permitting them to continue farming. The permits came under fire by Haredi rabbi Yosef Shalom Eliashiv. Bakshi-Doron and Lau, with the support of former Rishon LeZion Ovadia Yosef, ruled that the permits were valid. When Bakshi-Doron publicly told the farmers that they could rely on the sales, the Haredi newspaper Yated Ne'eman began to leak word that Eliashiv would delegitimize him and put him and his family in herem (ex-communication) if he refused to back down. Distraught, Bakshi-Doron went to meet with President of Israel Moshe Katsav, reportedly bursting into tears. Despite the open support of Katsav and Israeli Prime Minister Ehud Barak, Bakshi-Doron ultimately succumbed to the pressure from Eliashiv. This was widely seen by the National Religious camp as surrender to the Haredim.

==== Outreach ====
On January 21, 2002, Bakshi-Doron took part in an interfaith conference in Alexandria, Egypt. Among those present at the conference were the former Archbishop of Canterbury George Carey, Rabbi Michael Melchior, the muftis of Bethlehem, and the Palestinian Authority police forces. The attendees issued a joint agreement called the First Declaration of Alexandria of the Religious Leaders of the Holy Land, in which they denounced the ongoing violence in the Middle East. Although the accord received the support of both Ariel Sharon and Yasser Arafat, it had little perceivable effect. Bakshi-Doron continued to participate in interfaith activities and sat on the Board of World Religious Leaders for The Elijah Interfaith Institute.

Later in 2002, Bakshi-Doron accused Yasser Arafat of attempting to commit "a Holocaust against the State of Israel".

== Later positions ==
In 2004, Bakshi-Doron spoke out in favor of introducing civil marriage in Israel, saying that the law subjecting members of the different Millets to respective religious authorities had become irrelevant, and was now a source of division and hatred.

When I see all of the imams and rabbis coming together, this is a message to the Creator that we are here to do your will, that is to bring peace.

— Bakshi-Doron at the conclusion of the First World Congress of Imams and Rabbis for Peace.

Bakshi-Doron received attention in January 2005 for attending the first World Congress of Imams and Rabbis for Peace in Brussels, Belgium. The Congress was made up of some 180 notable Jewish and Muslim religious representatives, authorities, and scholars from all over the world. They released a statement calling for the promotion of peace and understanding between Jews and Muslims.

In August 2005, Bakshi-Doron, along with Modern Orthodox rabbis Norman Lamm and Aharon Lichtenstein, condemned calls by other prominent rabbis for Israel Defense Forces soldiers to disobey their orders to dismantle Jewish settlements as part of the Gaza Disengagement.

Bakshi-Doron's 1993 ruling that "Women can be of the Gedolim (great leaders) of the generation and serve as halakhic decisors" attracted attention in light of the controversy over the appointments of women to clerical positions in Orthodox congregations. But in a letter to the Rabbinical Council of America, dated June 23, 2015, Bakshi-Doron clarified his opinion that women could not take up official positions.

== Binyan Av institutions ==
Following his term as Sephardi Chief Rabbi of Israel, Bakshi-Doron continued his teaching and work as a halakhic arbiter. He also established the Binyan Av institutions, which include a central campus in the Ramat Shlomo neighborhood of Jerusalem.

== Conviction, posthumous acquittal ==
Bakshi-Doron was indicted in 2012 over his involvement in "the rabbis’ case," in which he was accused of issuing false rabbinic ordinations and yeshiva education certificates to 1,500 police and security services employees during his tenure as Chief Rabbi. The ordinations, equivalent to higher education on Israel's public employees' salary scale, entitled recipients to bonuses of NIS2,000–4,000, then valued at an additional $530–$1,060 per month. As a result, the government paid out hundreds of millions of shekels without justification. Bakshi-Doron was convicted of fraud and breach of trust on May 15, 2017, by the Jerusalem District Court for his part in the scam. He was sentenced to one year probation, and a fine of NIS 250,000. The conviction was overturned, posthumously, by the Israeli Supreme court on 25 May 2021.

== Personal life ==
At the age of 25 Bakshi-Doron married Esther, daughter of the previous Chief Rabbi of Akko, Shalom Lopes, with whom he had ten children. She died in 2005.

Bakshi-Doron died on April 12, 2020, in Shaare Zedek Medical Center, after contracting the COVID-19 virus during the COVID-19 pandemic in Israel. His condition was exacerbated by previous medical issues.

== Published works ==
- Binyan Av, responsa

== See also ==
- List of Sephardi chief rabbis of the Land of Israel

Jewish titles
Preceded by Mordechai Eliyahu	Sephardi Chief Rabbi of Israel; 1993–2003	Succeeded by Shlomo Amar
