= Chuck Davidson =

American Orthodox rabbi

Chuck Davidson (Hebrew: צ'אק דייווידסון; March 17, 1961) is an American Orthodox rabbi who made Aliya to Israel. His willingness to challenge the religious establishment of the Israeli Chief Rabbinate, specifically in the realms of marriage and conversion, has been controversial.

== Marriages ==
Davidson is one of the few Orthodox rabbis in Israel willing to marry people outside of the Rabbinate. According to Israeli law, marriage that conform to religious standards but are conducted outside of the official religious institutions is punishable with up to two years in jail, for both the couple and the officiating clergy. Davidson has publicly conducted over 170 marriages outside of the Rabbinate, and in doing so, has openly challenged the state to jail him. The state has not followed through, even though Davidson has claimed that his ultimate goal in conducting these marriages is to get arrested.

Davidson believes the law to be problematic and is confident the courts will strike the law down, however if they do not he is willing to sit in jail as a political prisoner.

Davidson is currently serving as head of Chuppot, the wedding division of Hashgacha Pratit, a Jerusalem organization which challenges the monopoly of the Rabbinate. The organization has performed hundreds of marriages around the country, despite the dangers of being jailed by the state.

== Conversions ==
Davidson helped create an organisation called Giyur KeHalacha, which has grown into a network of Orthodox conversion courts that are working independently of the Chief Rabbinate. The organisation gained traction after a number of high-profile rabbis came on board such as Shlomo Riskin. However, Davidson soon left that organisation, partly over their attempts to gain favour with the Chief Rabbinate.

He then co-founded a new organisation called Ahavat HaGer, which is an umbrella group of Orthodox rabbis around the world who wish to convert independently of centralized rabbinic organizations, and have agreed to accept any conversion that meets the minimum standard under the Halacha. The organisation connects communities around the world and has rabbis from Israel, the United States, Brazil, Colombia, Italy, Finland and Sweden as well as Israeli rabbis with communal connections in Germany, Russia, Lithuania, and the Netherlands.

Davidson is an expert on the laws of conversion having studied them for over a decade. He is also a protégé of Rabbi Haim Amsalem, and has sat on a number of conversion courts around the world with him. He is also active in training rabbis to perform conversions, and setting out principles to assist other courts.

While his adversarial style has alienated him from some authorities, Davidson believes that a forceful approach is needed to break the monopoly of the Chief Rabbis. He has called the current Chief Rabbinate an "illegitimately coercive institution"

== See also ==
- Chief Rabbinate of Israel
- Marriage in Israel
- Conversion to Judaism
