= Yerushalmim =

Israeli political party in Jerusalem

Yerushalmim's logo

Yerushalmim (Hebrew: ירושלמים; English: Jerusalemites) is an Israeli local civilian organization and political party in Jerusalem.

== History ==
Yerushalmim was formed in 2008 by Rachel Azaria, who was elected that year to the city council of Jerusalem. Yerushalmim is a municipal party whose members consist of secular and religious candidates and supporters, aiming to turn Jerusalem into a more pluralistic and open city. Its main target is to improve the life quality of the residents, together with battling radicalization and inequity in the public arena.

The party was established in 2008 by its current leader Rachel Azaria in an effort to contend in the municipal elections in Jerusalem. The organization contended in co-operation with the Hitorrerut Be'Yerushalaim party, turning to the young secular and religious audiences in the city, and won two seats in the city council, attracting 16,692 votes.

Aaron Leibowitz, who created a rebel kosher certification outside of the Chief Rabbinate, and Fleur Hassan-Nahoum were two of their councilors.

== See also ==
- Jerusalem Municipality
