= Yuval Cherlow =

Israeli Modern Orthodox rabbi

- יובל שרלו
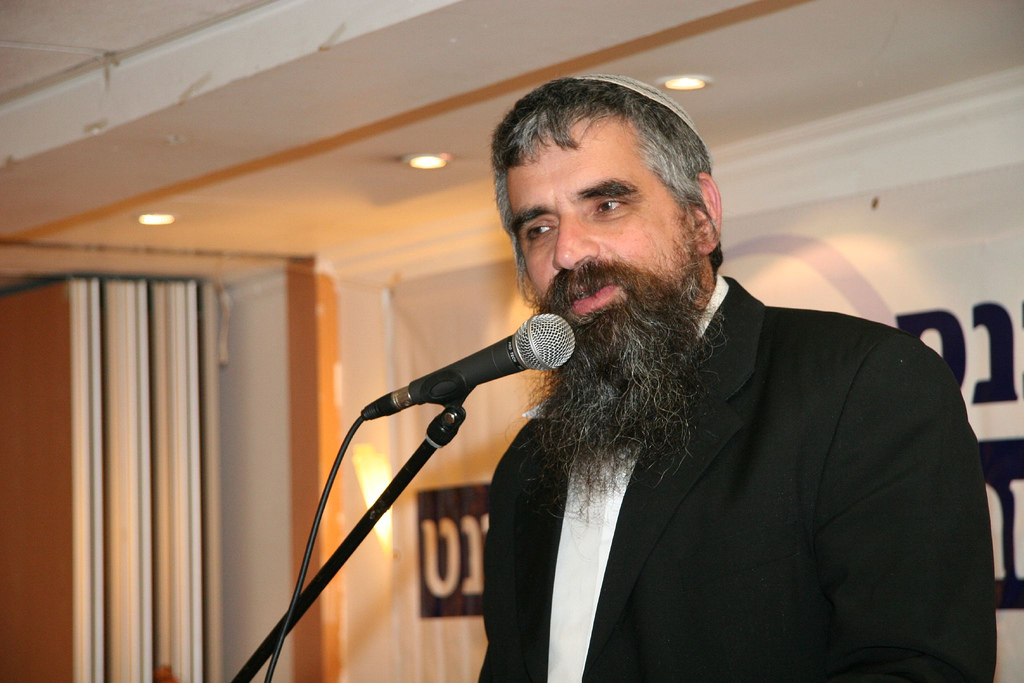
- Yuval Cherlow

Founder of Tzohar

Rosh Yeshiva of Yeshivat Hesder Amit Orot Shaul
- Title: Rosh Yeshiva

Personal life
- Born: December 29, 1957 (age 68) Herzliya, Israel
- Education: Yeshivat Har Etzion
- Occupation: Rabbi, Posek

Religious life
- Religion: Judaism
- Denomination: Modern Orthodox

Yuval Cherlow (Hebrew: יובל שרלו; born 1957) is a Modern Orthodox rabbi and posek. He is Rosh Yeshiva of Yeshivat Hesder Amit Orot Shaul in Tel Aviv, Israel. Cherlow was one of the founders of Tzohar, an organization of religious Zionist Orthodox rabbis in Israel.

== Biography ==
Yuval Cherlow was born in Herzliya, Israel. His parents were American-Jewish immigrants who moved to Israel in 1949. He was educated in Yeshivat Har Etzion. As part of his Hesder studies, he served as an armor officer in the IDF. In the reserves he was a company commander in the armoured corps. He lives in Efrat with his wife, who is a lecturer in the department of Jewish philosophy in Bar Ilan University.

== Rabbinic career ==
Cherlow's rabbinic career began in Kibbutz Tirat Zvi, where he served as a rabbi and teacher. Later he served as a rabbi in Yeshivat HaGolan in Hispin, in the southern Golan Heights. After the Rabin assassination, he helped found Tzohar, whose aim was to lessen the tensions between religious and non-religious communities. In 1998 he founded a Yeshivat Hesder in Petach Tikva, later to become Yeshivat Hesder Amit Orot Shaul in Kfar Batya, Raanana. He justified his decision to start a new yeshiva in the central area of Israel by saying that it is the place where the most important debates about the identity of the country take place.

Since 2001 Cherlow has answered more than 30,000 questions about Halakha and other issues related to Judaism via the Moreshet website. He published two books based on his internet responsa. He has also published books that deal with Bible commentary as well as the writings of Rabbi Avraham Yitzhak Kook.

Cherlow is a member of the ethics committee of the Israeli Ministry of Health and the committee which allocates the budget for new drugs. He is active in the BeMaagalei Tzedek ("Circles of Justice") movement. In 2011, he took part in the Israeli social justice protests.

== Views and opinions ==
Cherlow has voiced empathy for the difficulties faced by religious homosexual people, and has called for the Orthodox community to treat them with compassion. However, he still maintains that homosexual relationships are prohibited by Halakha. Cherlow has voiced liberal positions on some issues, such as allowing the use of artificial insemination by unmarried women in certain circumstances and supporting coed activities in Bnei Akiva. His view on Jewish marriage in Israel is that all Jews should be married according to Halakha, but if the Chief Rabbinate refuses to marry a couple, there should be an alternate method of being recognized as a couple according to secular law. He is opposed to civil disobedience, an issue that rose to the fore during Israel's unilateral disengagement from Gaza and evacuation of Israeli settlements in the region.

In 2012, Cherlow called on the State of Israel to recognise non-Orthodox streams of Judaism and Reform conversions. In response, Tzohar distanced itself from his remarks. Yizhar Hess of the Masorti Movement in Israel has suggested that Cherlow does not represent the mainstream of Zionist Orthodoxy in Israel, and Rabbi Yehoshua Shapira described Cherlow as a "neo-Reform rabbi in the Orthodox sector."

Cherlow is also interested in interfaith dialogue, and currently sits on the Board of World Religious Leaders for the Elijah Interfaith Institute.

Rabbi Cherlow deals mainly with ethical issues. He writes articles and tweets about ethics in Israel. In 2015, he established the ethics department at Tzohar. His book "BeTzalmo" (In His Image), published in 2015 by Maggid Press, deals with the religious meanings of God's image in people.

In March 2018 he garnered attention for stating that genetically cloned pig or any other animal would be Kosher.
