= Yeshiva Sulam Yaakov =

Orthodox Jewish educational institution

Sulam Yaakov (Jacob's ladder) was an Orthodox Yeshiva in Nachlaot, Jerusalem. It was founded in 2006 by Rabbi Aaron Leibowitz, a long time Nachlaot resident; it ceased activities in 2018. It offered a one-year Semikha (ordination) program, serving, largely, the "Anglo" community. Alongside Halacha, as standard, the program had a strong emphasis on spirituality and the development of interpersonal skills. For this reason, the yeshiva was named for Jacob's ladder, producing graduates who were “very grounded but also spiritual” (see Neo-Hasidism). It was housed in a 100-year-old synagogue.
