= Aaron Leibowitz =

American-born Israeli rabbi

- ארון ליבוביץ
- Born: United States
- Occupations: Rabbi, Educator, Politician
- Employer(s): Jerusalem Municipality, Hashgacha Pratit
- Known for: Founder of Yeshiva Sulam Yaakov, Councilor for the Yerushalmim party, Founder of Hashgacha Pratit
- Notable work: Establishing independent kosher certification in Israel

Aaron Leibowitz (Hebrew: ארון ליבוביץ) is an American-born Israeli rabbi, noted educator, and local politician. In 2006 he founded and headed Yeshiva Sulam Yaakov. In 2015 he became a councilor on the Jerusalem Municipality for the Yerushalmim party. In 2012 he started Hashgacha Pratit, a kosher certification independent of the Israeli Chief Rabbinate.

In 2018 he handed over the kosher certification to the larger organization, Tzohar, remaining CEO. The organization began officiating weddings outside of the Chief Rabbinate, despite this being illegal in Israel.

Following the handover in 2018, Leibowitz founded Chuppot, an organization that performs Orthodox weddings outside the control of the Chief Rabbinate.

He criticized the Chief Rabbinate as "racist" because of their views on who is a Jew, and their use of DNA testing to determine Jewish status.
