= Tzohar (organization) =

Tzohar Rabbinical Organization (Hebrew: ארגון רבני צהר, Irgun Rabbanei Tzohar) is an Israeli organization of over 800 religious Zionist Orthodox rabbis. It aims to bridge the gaps between religious and secular Jews in Israel.

== History ==
The organization was founded after the murder of Prime Minister Yitzhak Rabin in 1995 to help shape the Jewish character of Israel through dialogue and search for common elements of identity across all sectors of Israeli Jewish society.

Its founders are Rabbis Yuval Cherlow, David Stav, Shai Piron, Tzachi Lehman, Elisha Aviner, and Raffi Feurstein.

Tzohar has been supported by the Avi Chai Foundation since its inception.

== Activities ==
Tzohar rabbis take a non-judgemental and non-coercive approach, which is an alternative to the Rabbanut, Israel's governmental rabbinic authority. The rabbis of Tzohar participate in various religious activities such as officiating at Jewish weddings, training brides and grooms in the laws of niddah, and running prayer services that are open and welcoming (especially during the High Holy Days).

In 2015, Tzohar, along with the Israel Bar Association, introduced a prenuptial agreement meant to help ensure divorcing wives will get a get; under the agreement, the husband commits to paying a high sum of money daily to his spouse in the event of a separation.

== Kashrut ==
In 2017, Tzohar opened a private kosher authority in an effort to challenge the monopoly run by the Rabbanut. Tzohar opened their agency after another private organization, Hashgacha Pratit, agreed to close and move their organizational infrastructure over to Tzohar. The head of Hashgacha Pratit, Rabbi Aaron Leibowitz, helped arrange and facilitate the transfer to the new organization, and the head of Hashgacha Pratit, Rabbi Oren Duvduvani, moved across to head the new authority.

By the end of 2018, Tzohar had expanded to take in more than 100 businesses.
