= Chief Rabbinate of Israel =

Leading authority of Judaism in Israel

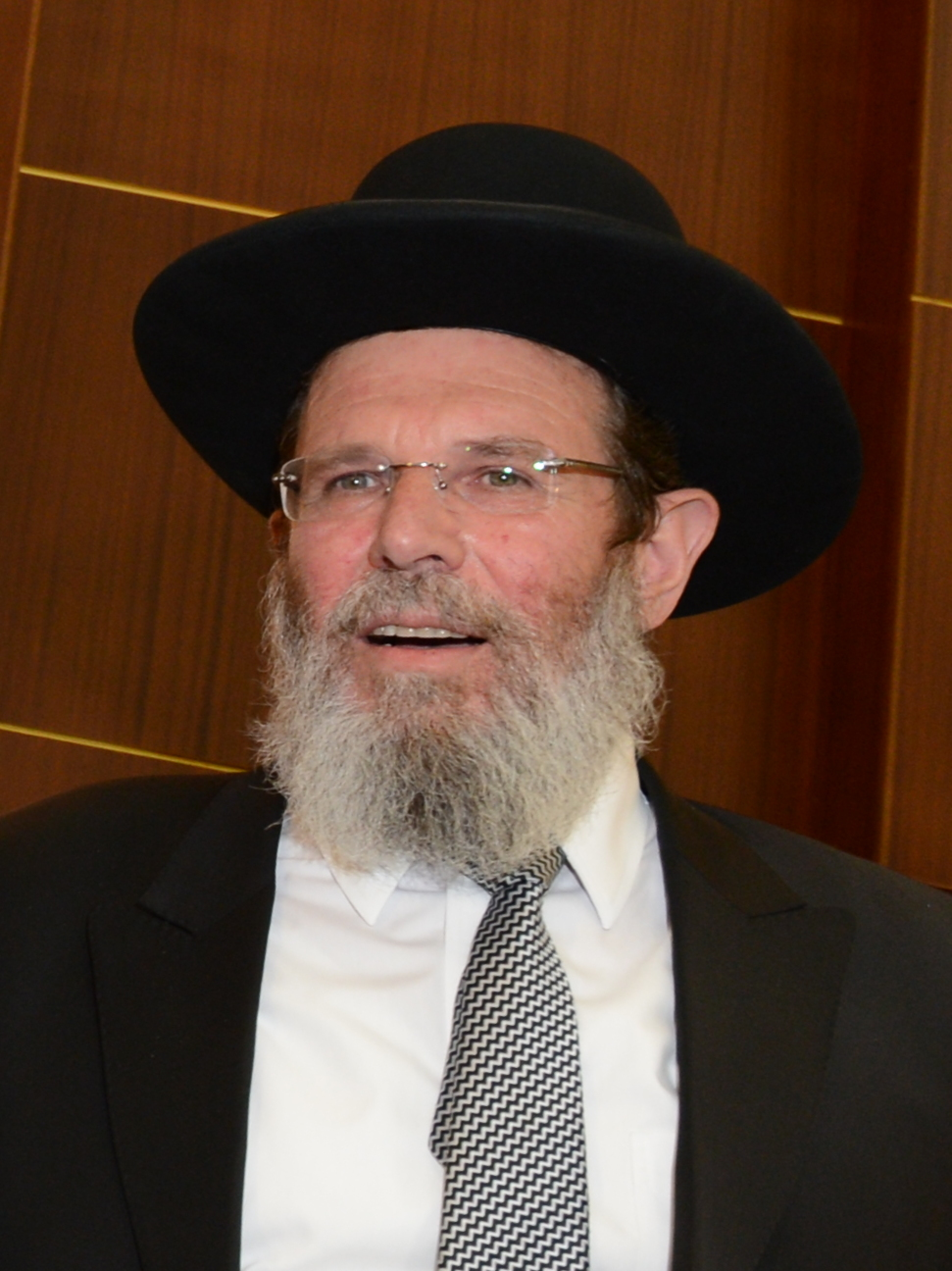
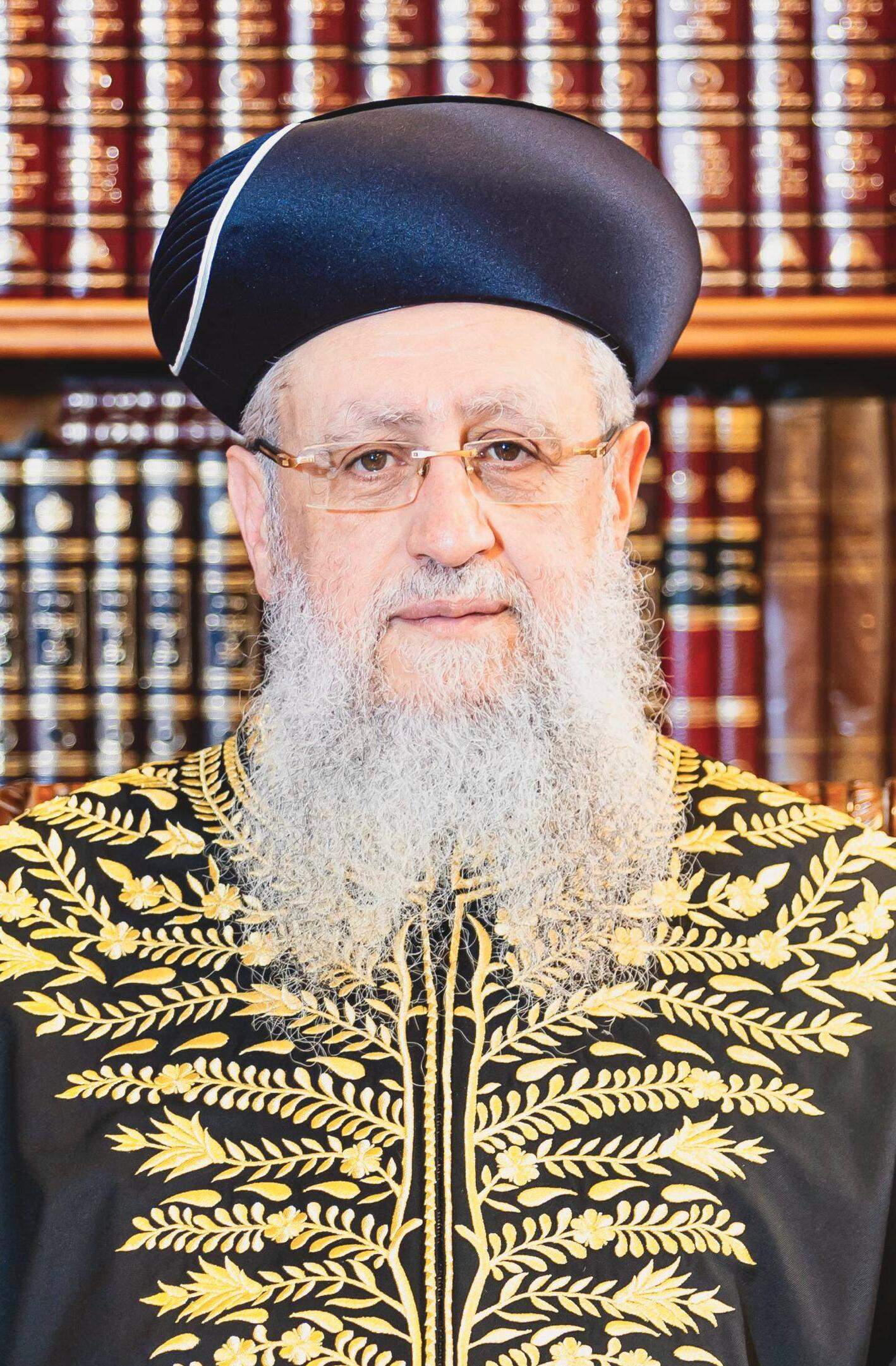
Kalman Ber (Ashkenazi) and David Yosef (Sephardi), became Chief Rabbis of Israel in 2024

The Chief Rabbinate of Israel (Hebrew: הָרַבָּנוּת הָרָאשִׁית לְיִשְׂרָאֵל, romanized: Ha-Rabbanut Ha-Rashit Li-Yisra'el) is recognized by Israeli law as the supreme rabbinic authority for Judaism in Israel. It was established in 1921 under the British Mandate and operates on the basis of the Chief Rabbinate of Israel Law, 5740-1980. The Chief Rabbinate Council assists the two Chief Rabbis, who alternate in its presidency. It has legal and administrative authority to organize religious arrangements for Israeli Jews. It also responds to halakhic questions submitted by Jewish public bodies in the Jewish diaspora. The Council sets, guides, and supervises agencies within its authority.

The Chief Rabbinate of Israel consists of two Chief Rabbis: an Ashkenazi rabbi and a Sephardi rabbi; the latter is known as the Rishon leZion. The Chief Rabbis are elected for 10-year terms. The present Sephardi Chief Rabbi is David Yosef, and the Ashkenazi Chief Rabbi is Kalman Ber, both of whom began their terms in 2024.

The Rabbinate has jurisdiction over many aspects of Jewish life in Israel. Its jurisdiction includes personal status issues, such as Jewish marriages and Jewish divorce, as well as Jewish burials, conversion to Judaism, Kashrut and kosher certification, aliyah (olim), supervision of Jewish holy sites, administration of various ritual baths (mikvaot) and yeshivot, and the rabbinical courts in Israel.

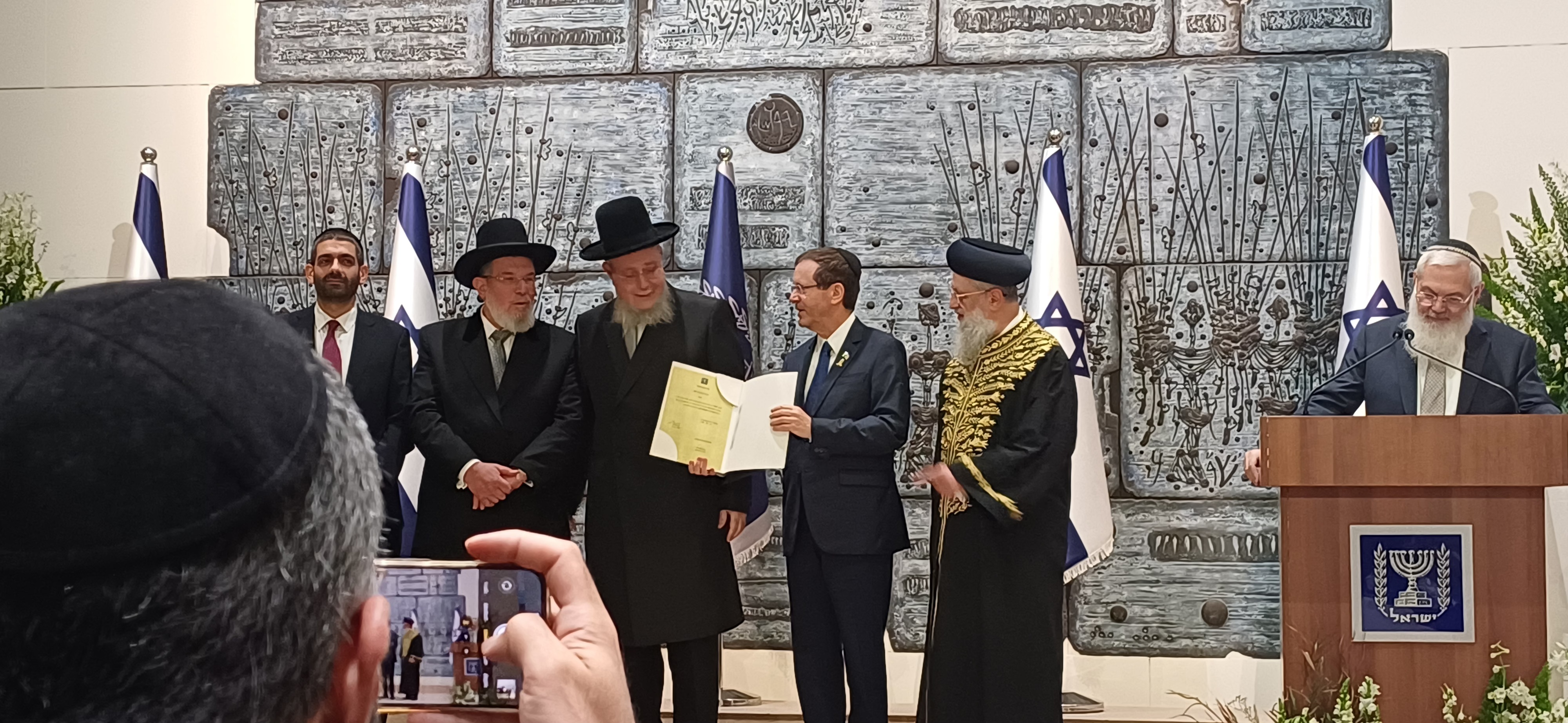
The chief rabbis and Israeli president Isaac Herzog at the swearing-in of rabbinical court judges.

The rabbinical courts are part of Israel's judicial system and are managed by the Ministry of Religious Services. The courts have exclusive jurisdiction over the marriage and divorce of Jews and have parallel competence with district courts in matters of personal status, alimony, child support, custody, and inheritance. Religious court verdicts are implemented and enforced—as for the civil court system—by the police, bailiffs' office, and other agencies.

In 2024, the Supreme Court of Israel ruled that women are eligible to serve on the Chief Rabbinate Council and as rabbis on the Chief Rabbi Election Assembly.

The Chief Rabbinate headquarters are at the Beit Yahav building, 80 Yirmiyahu Street, Jerusalem. The former seat of the institution, the Heichal Shlomo building dedicated in 1958, has been mainly a museum since 1992.

== History ==
All religious and personal status matters in Israel are determined by the religious authorities of the recognised confessional community to which a person belongs. There are Jewish, Muslim, and Druze communities and ten officially recognised Christian communities. The confessional system is based on the Millet system employed by the Ottoman Empire.

At the beginning of the 17th century, the title Rishon LeZion was bestowed upon the Chief Rabbi of Jerusalem. In 1842, the position of "Hakham Bashi"—Chief Rabbi of Constantinople who represented the Turkish Jews before the Sultan—and the position of Rishon LeZion, which at that time already represented the Old Yishuv before the Sultan, were subsumed under the Rishon LeZion.

On February 24, 1921, a rabbinic group met in Jerusalem with the approval of the Mandatory Palestine government. The group elected the so-called Rabbinical Council for Palestine, which consisted of Abraham Isaac Kook as Ashkenazi Chief Rabbi, Jacob Meir as Sephardi Chief Rabbi, and other rabbinical and lay councillors. The government announced that the Council and any beit din sanctioned thereby would be recognised as authoritative on Jewish law. The authority of the Ottoman Hakham Bashi would no longer be recognised in Palestine. The legal status of the Rabbinical Council and its Chief Rabbis was further refined in December 1927.

In 1947, David Ben-Gurion and the Orthodox religious parties reached an agreement, which included an understanding that matters of personal status in Israel would continue to be determined by the existing religious authorities. This arrangement has been termed the status quo and has been maintained despite numerous changes in government since then.

Under the arrangement, the Mandate-period confessional system would continue, with membership in the Jewish community based on membership in a body called "Knesset Israel", which was a voluntary organization open to Jews. There does not seem to have been any dispute at the time of who was a Jew. Jews could choose not to register with "Knesset Israel". Members of World Agudath Israel, for example, decided not to register.

In 1953, rabbinical courts were established, with jurisdiction over matters of marriage and divorces of all Jews in Israel, nationals and residents (section 1). It was also provided that marriages and divorces of Jews in Israel would be conducted according to the law of the Torah (section 2).

Since 1953, the rabbinate has only approved religious marriages in Israel that are conducted in accordance with the Orthodox interpretation of Halakha. The only exception to these arrangements was that marriages entered into abroad would be recognised in Israel as valid.

== Conversions ==
The State of Israel recognises the Chief Rabbinate as the sole authority to perform conversions to Judaism in Israel. In the past, conversion was often done sensitively and with an appreciation for halakhic traditions—for example, during the tenure of Ben-Zion Meir Hai Uziel, who was very encouraging of converts. In recent generations, the authorities' criteria for undergoing the process have become more stringent—to the extent that the Rabbinate takes actions that are unprecedented in Jewish history (e.g., cancelling conversions). Some rabbis claim this centralisation is a threat to the future of the Jewish people.

Significant controversy has shrouded the relationship between the Chief Rabbis and the conversion process. In the summer of 2017, it was revealed that the Chief Rabbinate held a list of batei din whose conversions it would recognise and another, secreted list of rabbis and batei din whose conversions it would not recognise.

The list generated controversy due to the inclusion of several respected Orthodox rabbis, such as Avi Weiss and Yehoshua Fass, along with non-Orthodox rabbis and batei din. The list included Conservative and Reform conversion programs, which the Chief Rabbis do not accept on ideological grounds. However, many other programs were seemingly omitted from the list. The list was kept secret, providing no chance for external review or appeal, which resulted in discord.

The blacklist did not affect the ability to make aliyah—immigration is controlled by the Law of Return rather than the Rabbinate—but did impact individuals’ access to recognized marriage in Israel. The situation became more problematic when it was revealed that Haskel Lookstein, an Orthodox rabbi in the United States, was included on the blacklist, preventing some of his students from marrying in Israel. Lookstein officiated Ivanka Trump’s conversion, causing tension between Israel and the United States shortly after her father was elected president. Soon after that, the rules were amended so that Trump's conversion was accepted. Still, there were questions about whether the changes were made only to curry favour with the Trump administration.

The conversion process became a topic of political discussion when ultra-Orthodox allies of the Chief Rabbis in the Knesset sought to pass a law designating the Chief Rabbinate as the sole government-recognized authority for performing conversions in Israel.

The control the Rabbinate attempted to exert extended into the Diaspora when it sought to create universal standards for conversion for all Jewish communities outside of Israel in 2016.

The Chief Rabbis have faced pushback against their stance in Israel through the rabbis of Tzohar, who have created an independent path to conversion and are trying to alleviate some of the "horror stories" that come from the Rabbinate. Tzohar had claimed to have performed over 500 conversions of children by 2018, and were seeking to simplify the process for surrogates to convert. The Supreme Court of Israel has since demanded that their conversions be accepted, but there were efforts to legislate an override the High Court's decision in 2017.

Other efforts within the Orthodox world exist to conduct conversions outside the Rabbinate. These include efforts by Haim Amsalem and Chuck Davidson, who want to return to the traditions of the earlier Chief Rabbis such as Ben-Zion Meir Hai Uziel with a more lenient approach in keeping with the Halakha. Part of their desire is to address the over 300,000 Israelis from the former Soviet Union who the Rabbinate does not recognize as Jewish, as well as the growing issue of assimilation and intermarriage outside of Israel.

The conversion debate as of 2018 surrounds the Orthodox stream. There is pressure from within the Reform and Conservative communities to have their conversions recognized.

In March 2019, it was confirmed that the Chief Rabbinate was using genealogical DNA testing to determine Jewish status. A group of religious Zionist and Modern Orthodox organizations was outraged, as this was contrary to Jewish law. Rabbi Aaron Leibowitz, the CEO of Chuppot and Hashgacha Pratit, called the Chief Rabbinate "racist".

== Marriages ==
While the State of Israel recognizes any marriage performed legally in another country, for marriages performed within Israel, only religious marriage is recognized as legal; as such, the Chief Rabbinate is granted control over all Jewish marriages. They also have the right to refuse someone the status of Jew, thus making it impossible for them to get legally married in Israel. The Rabbinate and their local religious councils are the only ones able to register rabbis to perform weddings, thus creating a monopoly for themselves.

The Rabbinate control also means that there are 400,000 immigrants from the former USSR who have moved to Israel, many of whom are Jewish, who are not permitted to marry in Israel and must travel overseas for a legally-recognized marriage.

Because of Israeli law, the rabbi that performs a marriage outside of the Rabbinate can be charged with a criminal offense and be jailed for up to two years. In spite of this, there are a number of people and organizations that perform marriages outside of the rabbinate framework. Chuck Davidson has openly challenged the state to jail him for his performing of marriages. He has personally performed hundreds of marriages outside of the rabbinate, while those in his network have performed many more. He works with Hashgacha Pratit, another organization which challenges the monopoly of the Rabbinate on kashrut and weddings.

Seth Farber has set up an organization, Itim. While Itim still works from within the Rabbinate, and, therefore, is beholden to their rules, it tries to find a gentler path for the many secular people who want to use their services. Another group involved in marriage within the Rabbinate is the Tzohar network.

Since the Rabbinate is affiliated with Orthodoxy, no Reform or Conservative rabbi may legally officiate at a wedding in Israel. Conservative rabbi Dov Haiyun was detained in July 2018 for performing an unsanctioned wedding, leading to protests and condemnation from opposition lawmakers and mainstream Jewish organizations in the United States.

== Semikhah ==
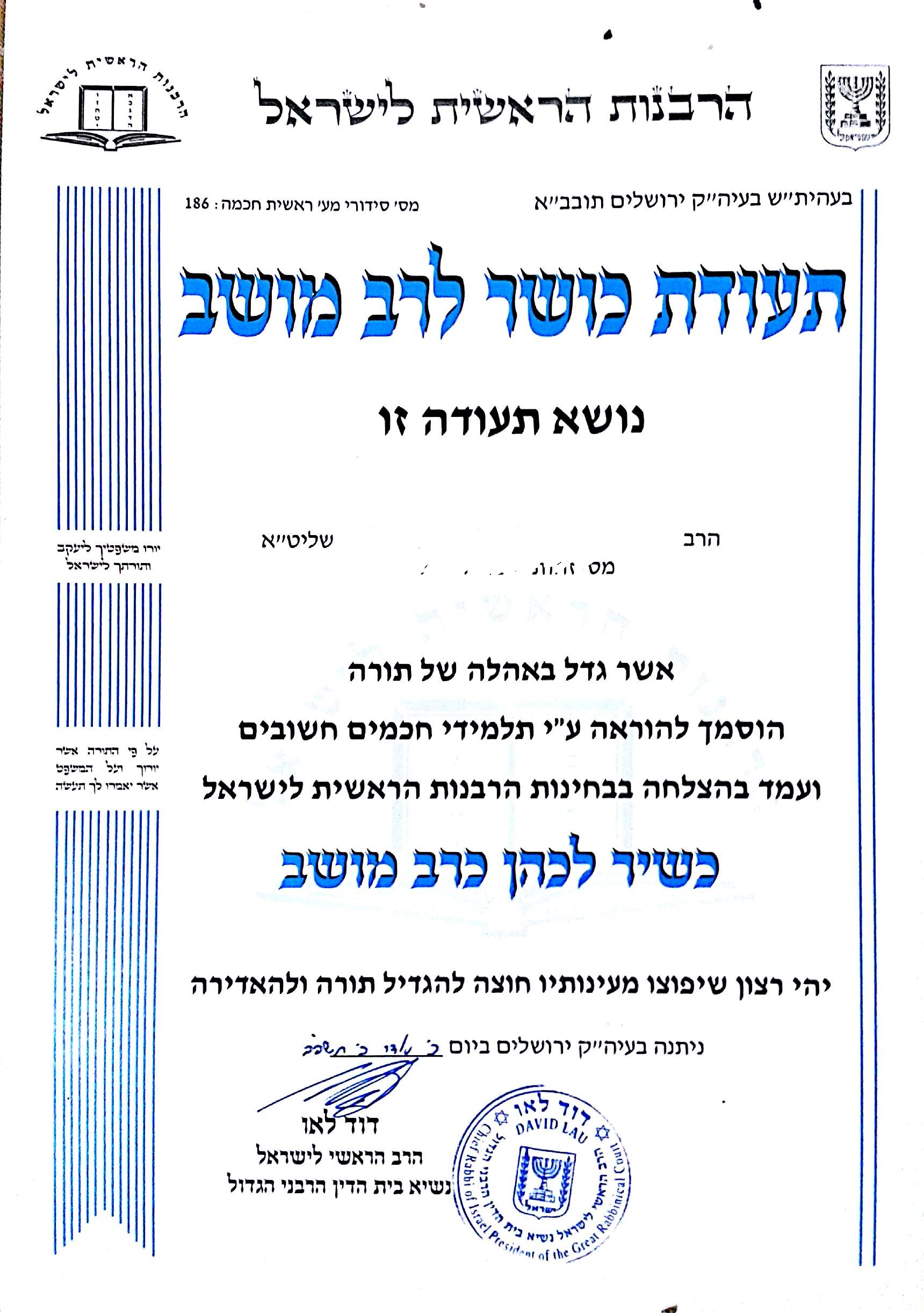
Semikhah teudah specifying that the certificant has "succeeded in passing the required bechinot (tests)".

The Chief Rabbinate confers semikhah (rabbinic ordination) once the candidate has passed a series of six written tests on specified subjects.

Ordination by the Chief Rabbinate is not exclusive in Israel, as many other rabbis and organizations offer programs, including that of Zalman Nechemia Goldberg. To be employed as a rabbi by the State, only semikhah from the Chief Rabbinate is accepted.

=== Opening of Chief Rabbinate examinations to women ===
In February 2026, the Chief Rabbinate of Israel opened registration for its state rabbinical certification examinations to women for the first time, following rulings by the High Court of Justice that found the previous exclusion of women to constitute unlawful discrimination.

Registration opened in mid-February and was scheduled to remain open until the end of the month, with the first examinations for women set to take place after Passover. Women were permitted to register for the same certification tracks as men under the Rabbinate's existing examination framework, including the Yoreh Yoreh track and additional certification levels linked to neighbourhood, local, regional and city rabbinic qualifications.

==== Background and legal proceedings ====
For many years, the Rabbinate restricted its official rabbinical examinations to male candidates. Although women in Israel have pursued advanced Torah study and alternative certification frameworks, the Rabbinate's examinations function as state-recognised credentials. In certain public-sector contexts, first-tier certification has been treated as equivalent to an academic degree for purposes of eligibility and salary classification.

A petition was filed by six women together with advocacy organisations including ITIM, the Rackman Center and Kolech . The petitioners argued that the exclusion of women from examinations with tangible civil and professional consequences amounted to discrimination.

In July 2025, the High Court of Justice issued a unanimous ruling holding that women could not be barred from sitting the examinations. The judgment, authored by Deputy Chief Justice Noam Sohlberg, stated that because the certificates carry practical state recognition and affect employment and remuneration in the public sector, the Rabbinate could not rely solely on claims of exclusive religious autonomy to justify exclusion.

Following the ruling, examination dates were temporarily delayed while legal proceedings continued. In October 2025, the Rabbinate sought a rehearing and proposed limiting women's participation to certain subject areas. In November 2025, Supreme Court President Isaac Amit rejected the request, clearing the way for full implementation of the July decision.

==== Implementation and reactions ====
With the opening of registration in February 2026, women became eligible to sit the same examinations administered by the Rabbinate's examinations unit as male candidates. The Rabbinate stated that a professional committee was examining broader reforms to the examination system.

Advocacy groups involved in the petition described the development as a historic milestone for gender equality within Israel's religious institutions. The decision has been widely regarded as reshaping the boundary between religious authority and state-backed certification in Israel, with broader implications for the status of women in religious and public life.

== Criticism and support ==
With the Rabbinate existing as a government department, there have been calls for the entire department to be shut down, and for a return to a localised model of rabbinate. These calls have increased in recent times because of two former Chief Rabbis being convicted of fraud. There are also charges that the office has become a political, rather than a religious, office, and that it has become beholden to the Haredi world and become their "puppets".

Their control of marriages and the fact that some people have described their experiences as negative has caused a call for civil marriage in Israel.

At the same time, many defend the Chief Rabbinate as protecting the Jewish nature of Israel, the Torah, and Diaspora Jewry.
