= Yaakov Shapira =

Israeli rabbi

Rabbi Yaakov Shapira
- יעקב אלעזר כהנא שפירא
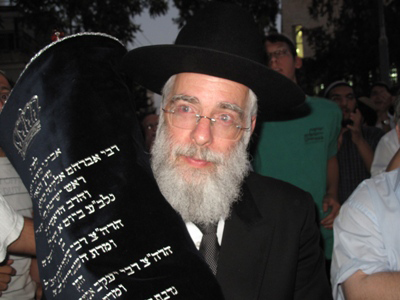
- Rabbi Yaakov Shapira in 2009

Rosh Yeshiva of Mercaz HaRav
- Incumbent
- Assumed office 2007

Member of the Chief Rabbinate Council

Personal life
- Born: Yaakov Elazer Kahana Shapira; 26 December 1950 (age 75) Jerusalem
- Education: Mercaz HaRav
- Occupation: Rosh Yeshiva, Scholar

Religious life
- Religion: Judaism
- Denomination: Orthodox

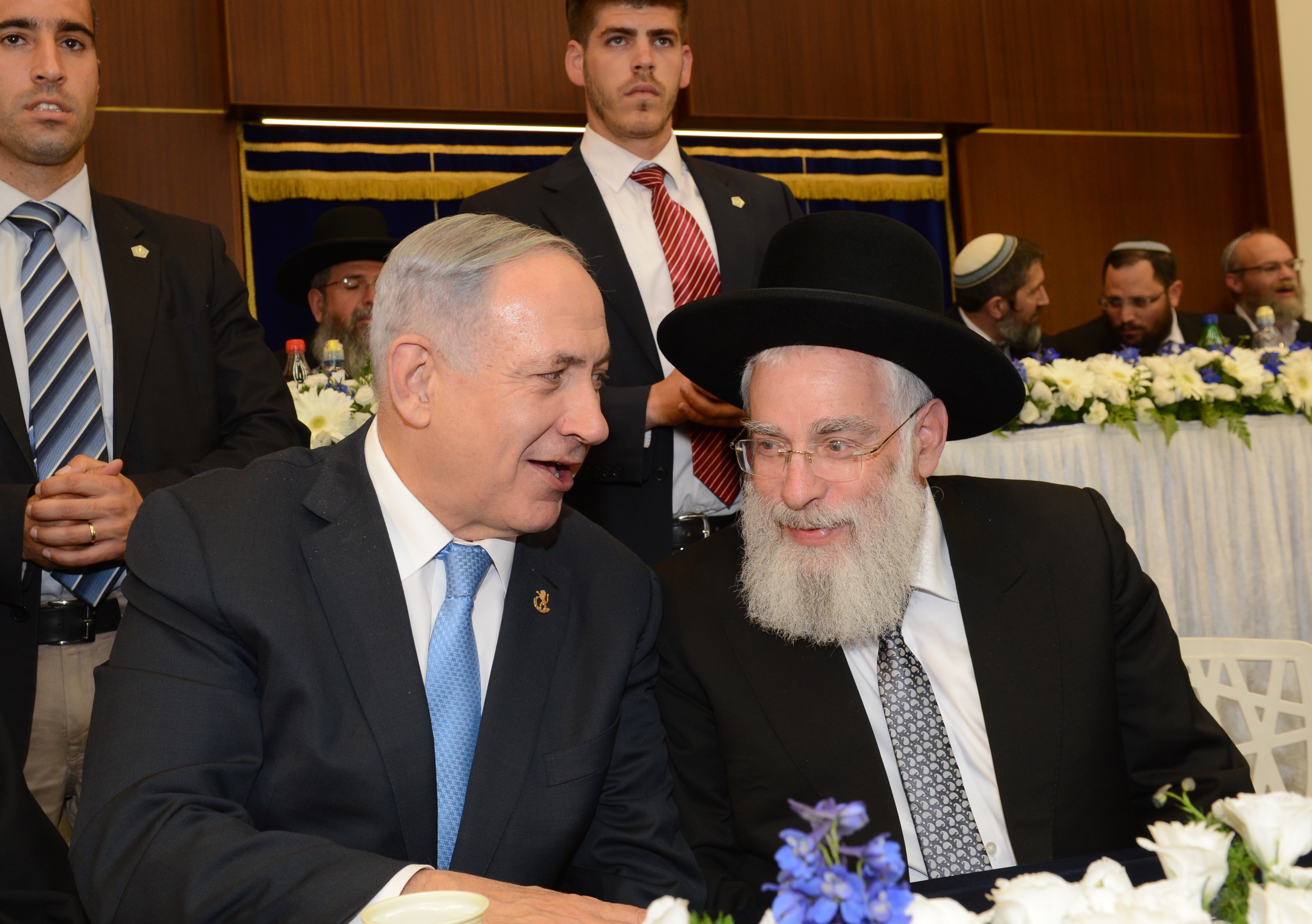
Rabbi Shapiro with Prime Minister Benjamin Netanyahu at Yom Yerushalayim celebration at Mercaz HaRav

Yaakov Elazer Kahana Shapira (Hebrew: יעקב אלעזר כהנא שפירא; born 26 December 1950) is the rosh yeshiva of the Mercaz HaRav yeshiva in Jerusalem and a member of the Chief Rabbinate Council.

== Biography ==
Shapiro was born in Jerusalem to Rabbi Avraham Shapira, the previous Rosh Yeshiva of Mercaz HaRav, and his wife, Penina Perl. He studied in the Yashlatz yeshiva high school, and then at Yeshivat Mercaz Harav. He was ordained by his father and Rabbi Shaul Yisraeli.

== Rabbinic career ==
In 1983, his father appointed him as a lecturer in Mercaz Harav, and until 1993, he served as his father's right-hand man in the Chief Rabbinate. After his father's death in 2007, Rabbi Yaakov Shapira was appointed Rosh Yeshiva, in accordance with his father's will.

In 2008, during his first year as Rosh Yeshiva, an Arab from Jabel Mukaber in East Jerusalem entered the yeshiva with a gun and began firing indiscriminately, killing eight students and wounding 15 others.

In 2013, Rabbi Shapira competed for the position of Ashkenazi Chief Rabbi of Israel, but lost to Rabbi David Lau. In October 2014, he submitted his candidacy for the position of Chief Rabbi of Jerusalem, but withdrew from the race on election day.
