= 2013 Israeli chief rabbi elections =

Elections for the chief rabbis of Israel

Sefardi Chief Rabbi
- 24 July 2013
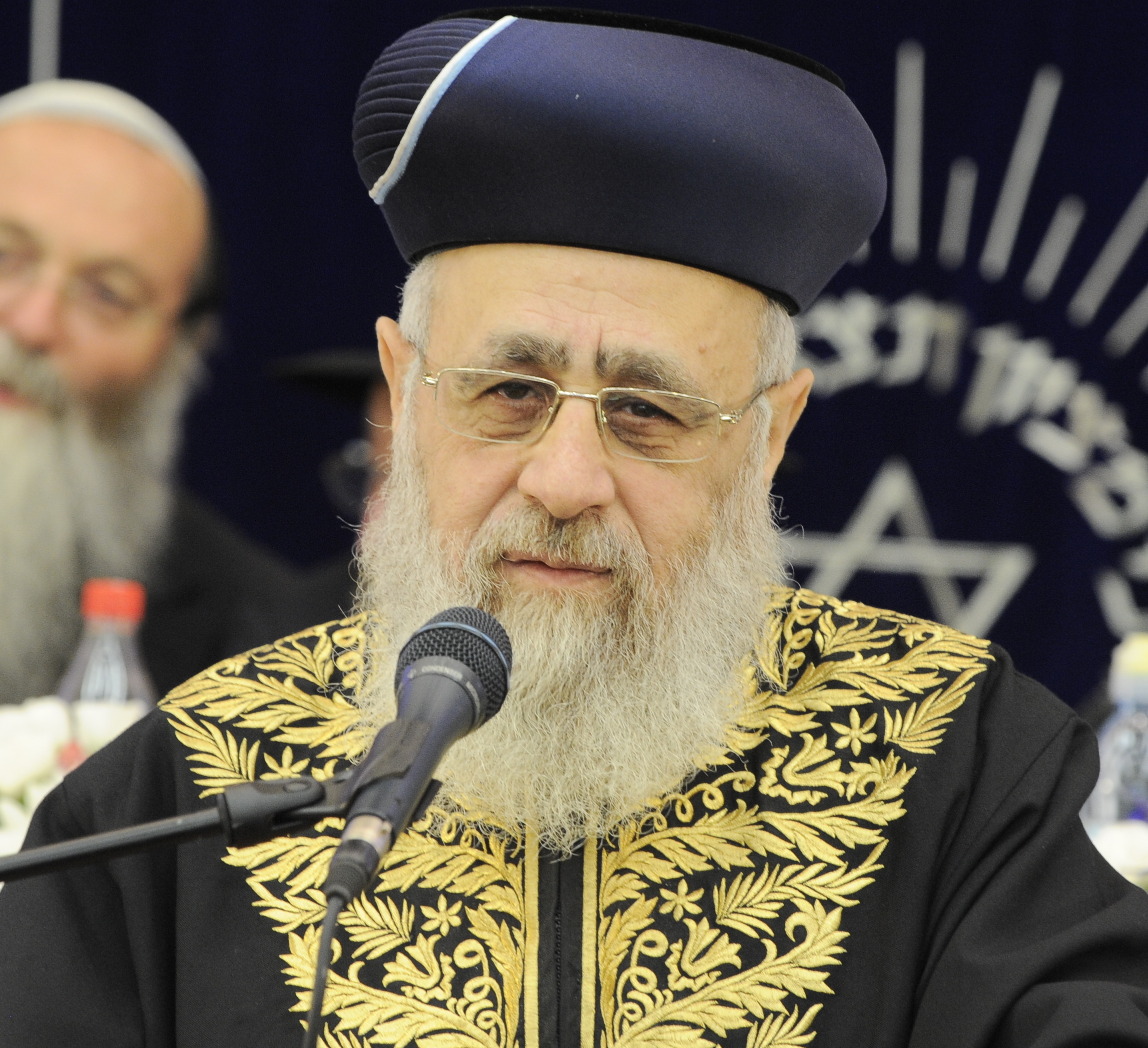

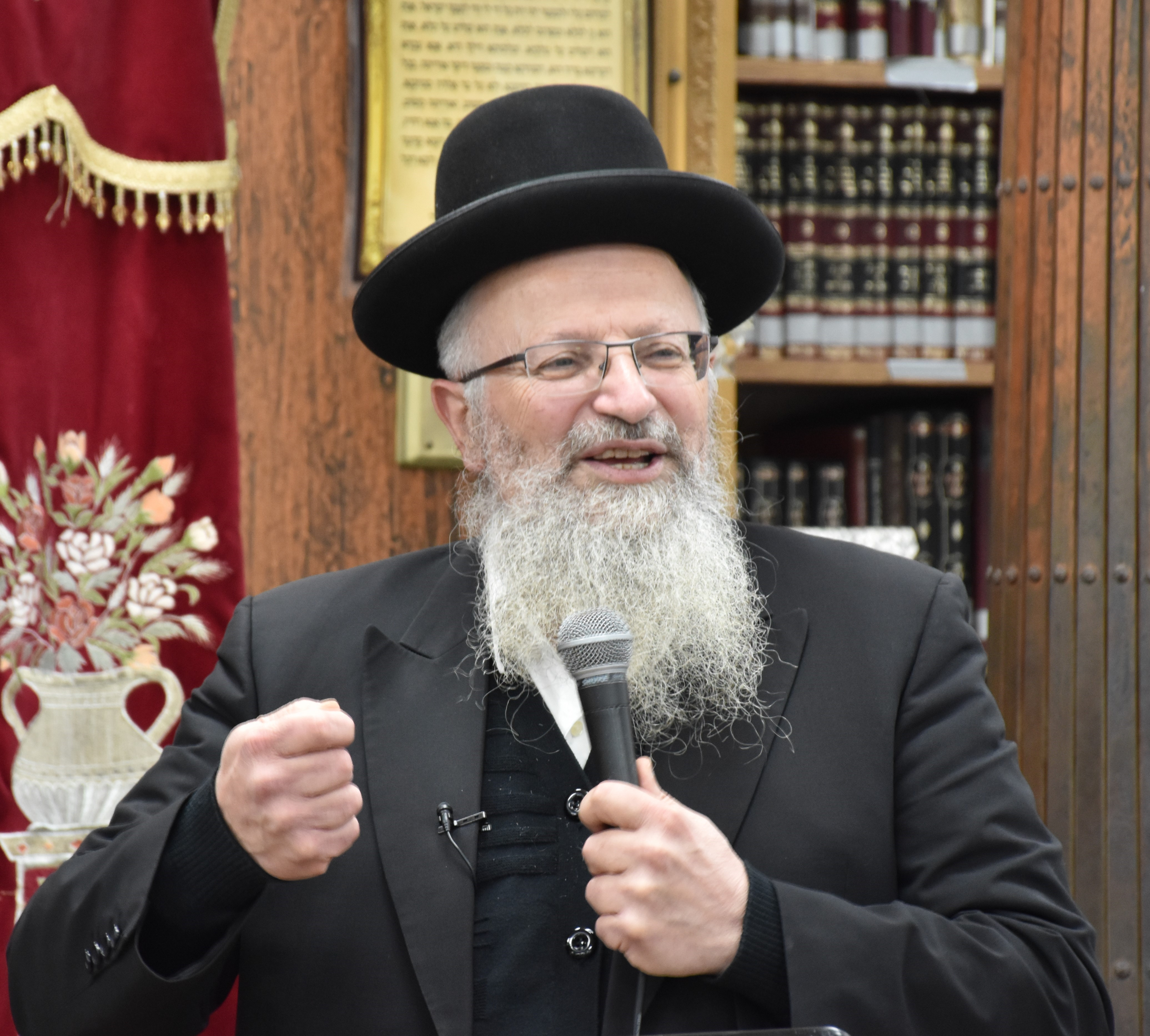

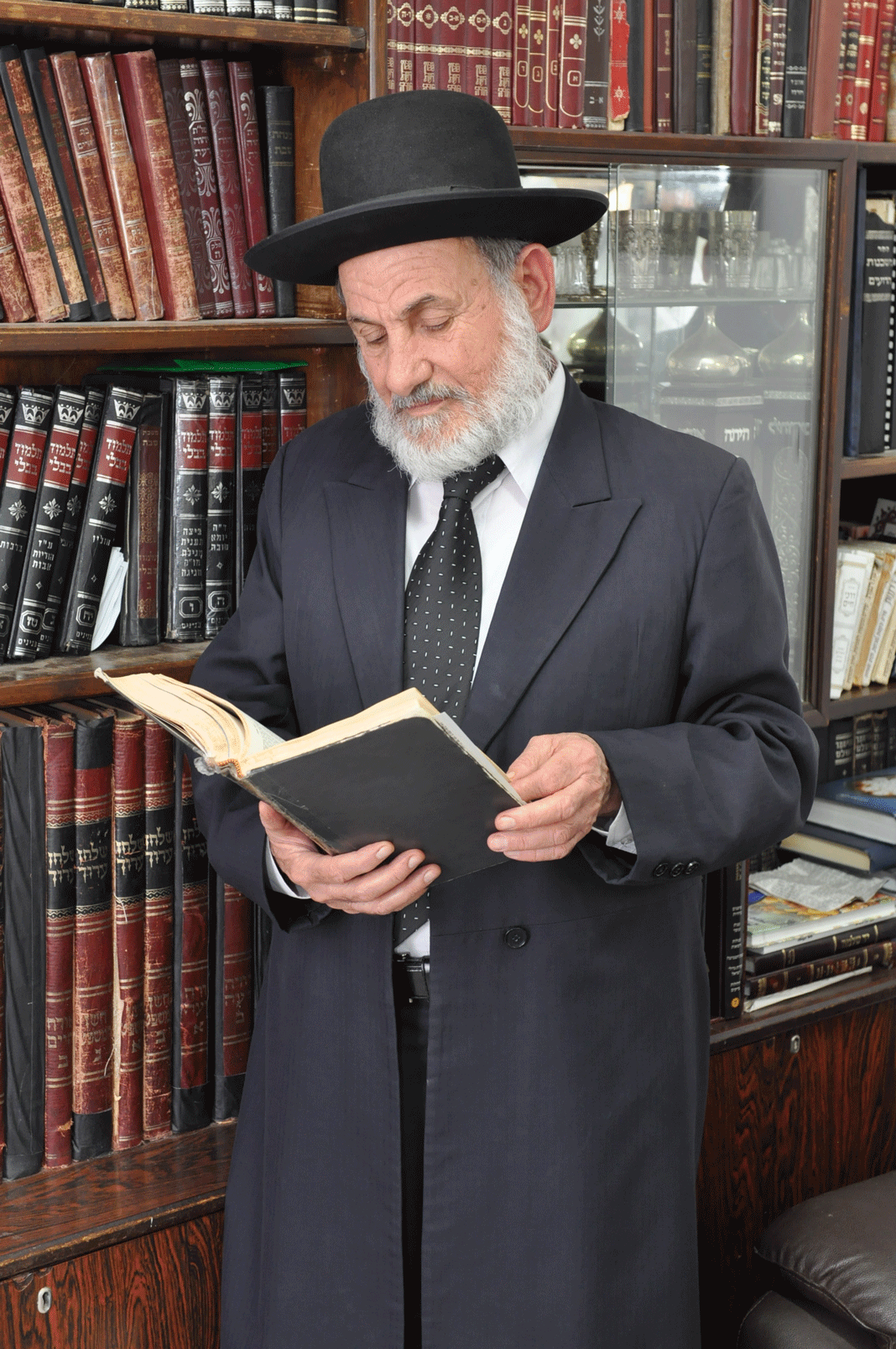
Candidate	Yitzhak Yosef	Shmuel Eliyahu	Zion Buaron
Popular vote	68	49	28

Ashkenazi Chief Rabbi
- 24 July 2013
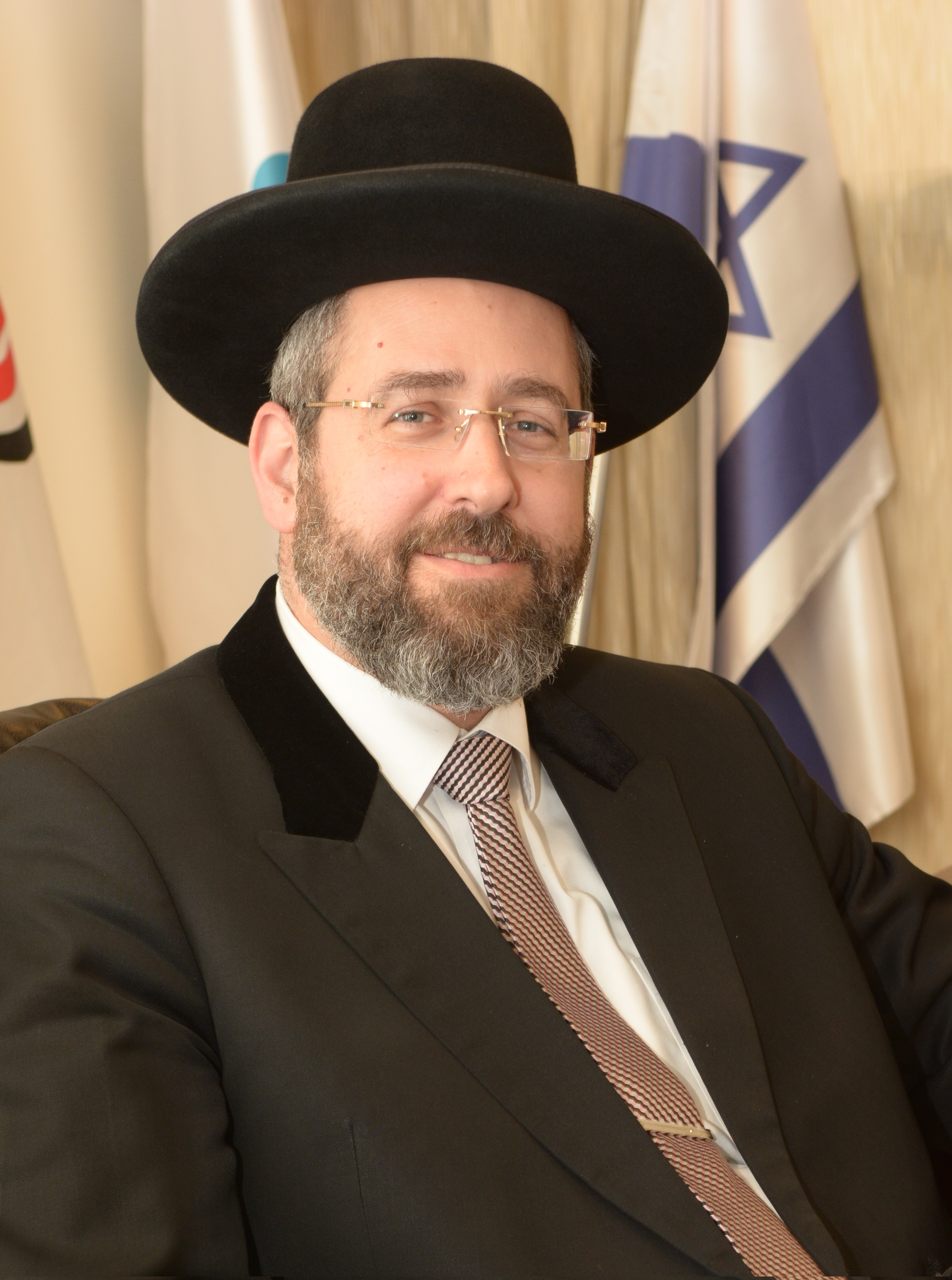

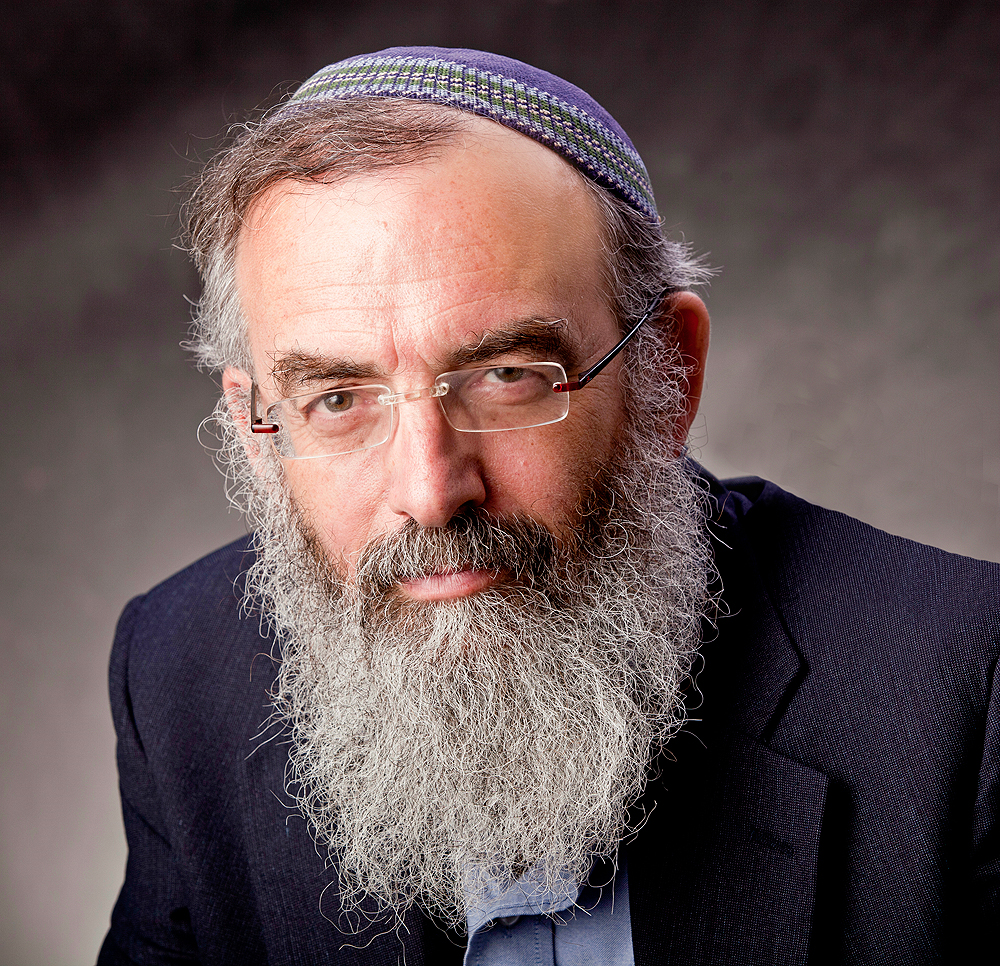

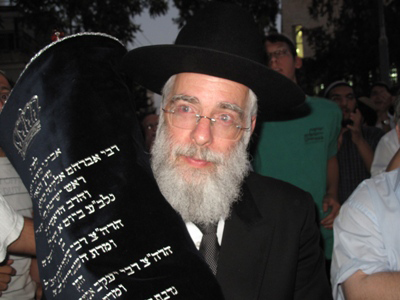
Candidate	David Lau	David Stav	Yaakov Shapira
Popular vote	68	54	25

Elections for the positions of Chief Rabbis of Israel were held at the Leonardo Hotel in Jerusalem on 24 July 2013. The elections were to elect the chief rabbis for the Ashkenazi and Sephardi communities.

== Background ==
The position of chief rabbi is a position that places the winning candidate at the head of the state religious infrastructure. This includes kosher certification, all Jewish marriages and deaths in Israel. They also have significant influence over the question of who is a Jew.

The position is for a 10-year term, with incumbents unable to run for reelection. As such the incumbents Yona Metzger and Shlomo Amar were unable to be candidates.

The elections were conducted at the Leonardo Hotel, with 150 eligible voters. These were made up by 80 rabbis representing the religious councils, and 70 other people representing the government, Knesset and local authorities. There was a push to include 40 women in this group, but at the election there was only 10 women voting.

== Candidates ==
There were a number of candidates for each position. This represented a divide between the ultra Orthodox and Zionist communities.

There were 4 sons of former chief rabbis standing for elections, David Lau son of Yisrael Meir, Yaakov Shapira son of Avraham, Yitzhak Yosef son of Ovadia and Shmuel Eliyahu son of Mordechai. There was a legal effort to have Eliyahu eliminated from the elections due to racist and extremist views. Yehuda Deri, who is the brother of minister Aryeh and related to former Chief Rabbi Shlomo Amar was also a candidate.

The other major candidates were David Stav who is the head of the Tzohar organization and a voice to fundamentally restructure the Rabbinate, and Zion Boaron.

== Results ==
Only 147 of the 150 eligible voters turned up to vote. David Lau and Yitzchak Yosef were the successful candidates, both getting 68 votes after the non Haredi vote was split.

The results were as follows:

Sefardi Chief Rabbi
Candidate	Votes
Yitzhak Yosef	68
Shmuel Eliyahu	49
Zion Boaron	28
Unknown	2
Total	147

Ashkenazi chief rabbi
Candidate	Votes
David Lau	68
David Stav	54
Yaakov Shapira	25
Total	147
