= Shmuel Eliyahu =

Israeli rabbi

Rabbi Shmuel Eliyahu שמואל אליהו
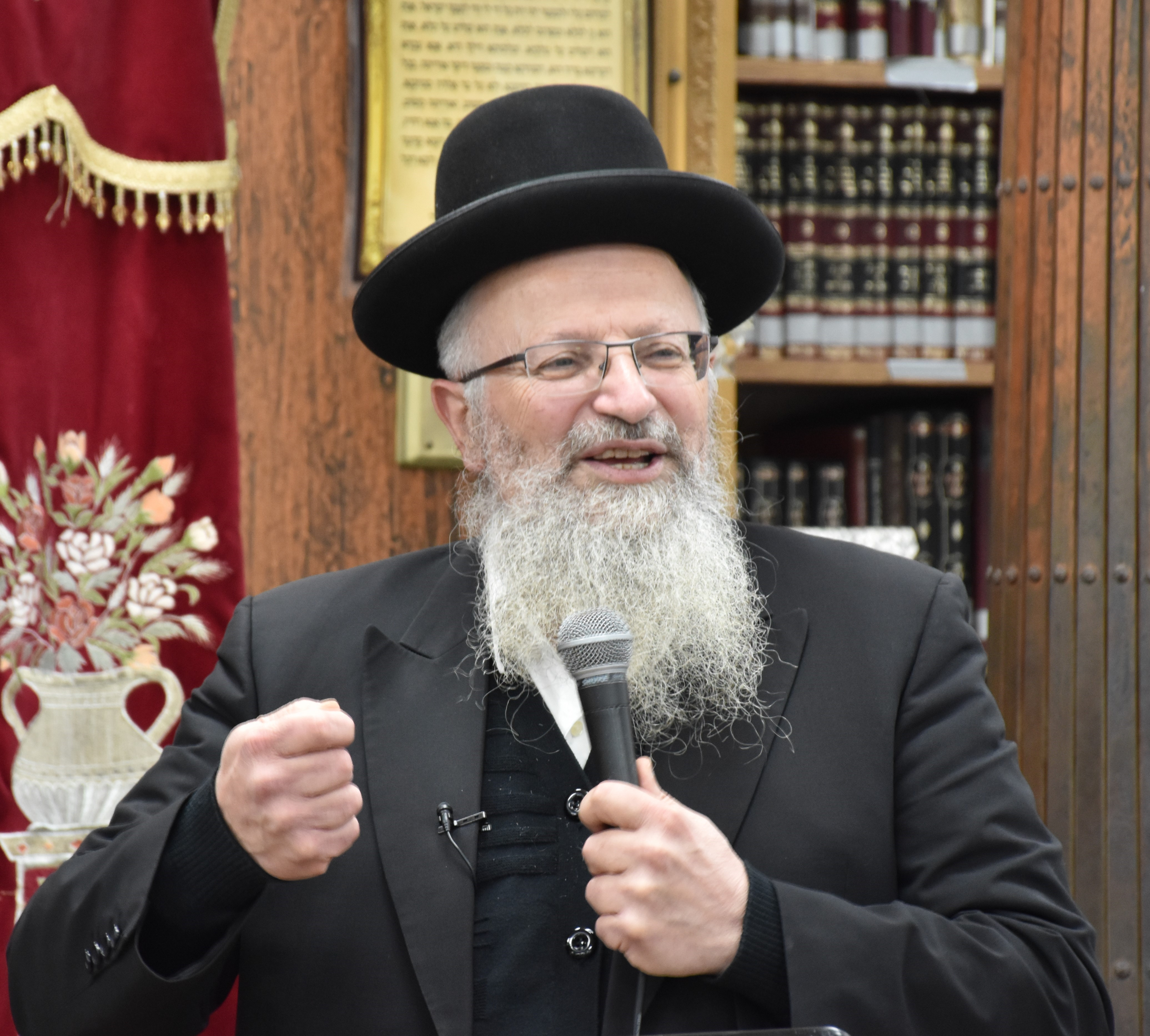
- Eliyahu in 2019

Personal life
- Born: 29 November 1956 (age 69)
- Children: Amihai Eliyahu (son)
- Parents: Mordechai Eliyahu (father); Tzviya (mother)
- Education: Mercaz HaRav Kook

Religious life
- Religion: Judaism
- Denomination: Orthodox Judaism / Religious Zionism

Jewish leader
- Position: Chief Rabbi of Safed
- Other: Chief Rabbinate Council

Shmuel Eliyahu (Hebrew: שמואל אליהו; born 29 November 1956) is an Israeli Orthodox rabbi. He is the Chief Rabbi of Safed and a member of the Chief Rabbinate Council.

Some of Eliyahu's statements regarding Arabs and Palestinians have been construed as being discriminatory in nature. On 30 May 2022, the U.S. State Department in the Biden administration revoked Eliyahu's visa to enter the United States.

== Early life ==
Shmuel Eliyahu was born to Mordechai Eliyahu, the former Sephardi Chief Rabbi of Israel, and his wife Tzviya. As a boy, he studied at Yashlatz in Jerusalem, and later at Mercaz HaRav Kook, where he was a student of Zvi Yehuda Kook. He also served in an Israel Defense Forces (IDF) combat unit.

== Career ==
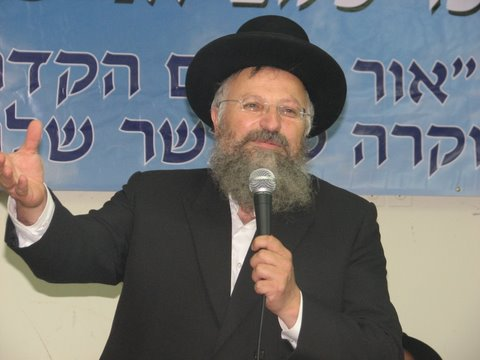
Shmuel Eliyahu speaking at Yeshivat Mevaser Shalom

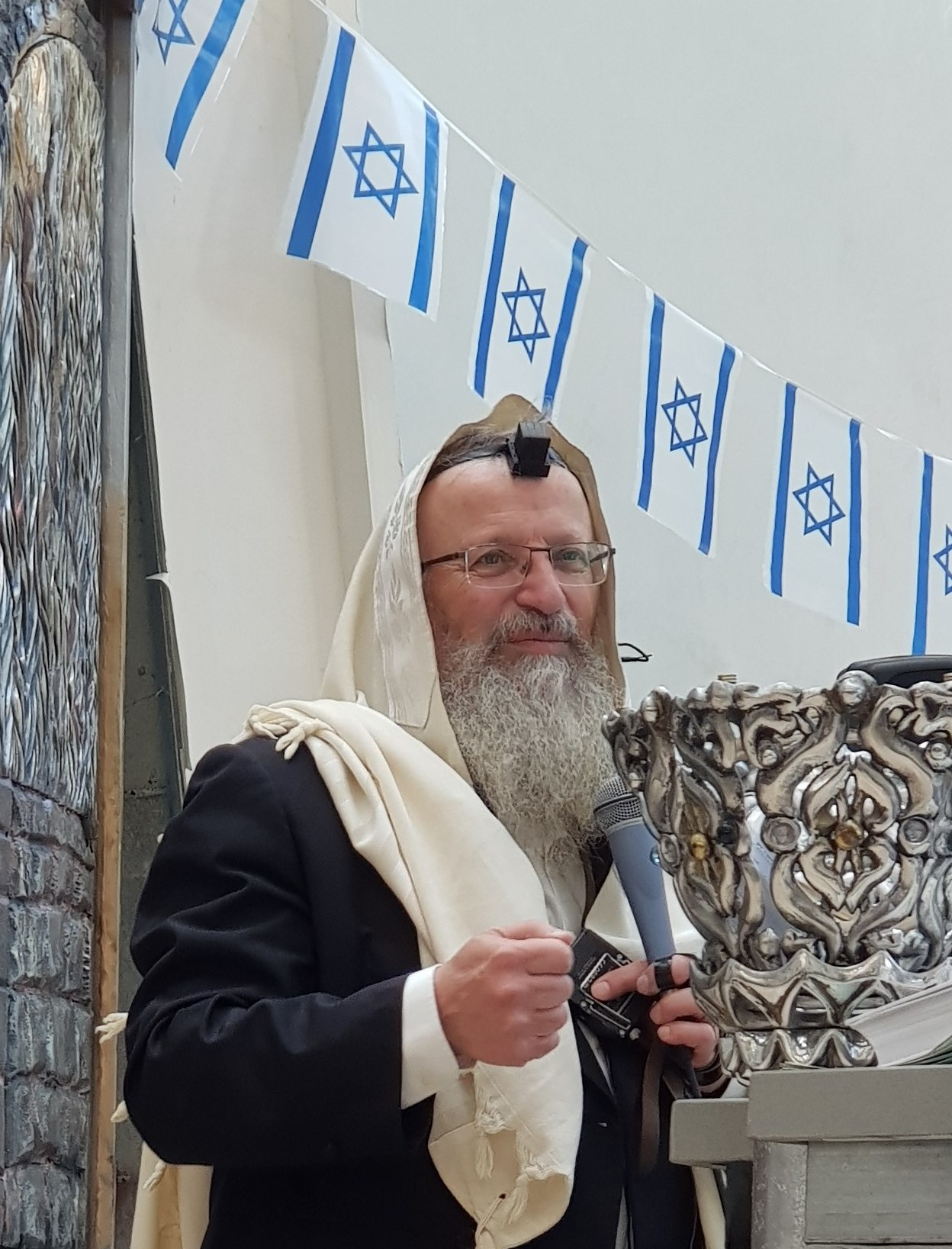
Eliyahu speaking in Tel Aviv on Israel Independence Day

Eliyahu received his semikhah (ordination as rabbi) at age 23, and at age 29 was appointed to the position of Municipal Rabbi of Shlomi. Three years later, he was appointed the Chief Rabbi of Safed.

In July 2013, Eliyahu ran for the position of Sephardi Chief Rabbi of Israel. Israeli Attorney General Yehuda Weinstein requested that Eliyahu abandon his candidacy, noting that he had made a number of offensive statements against Arabs. Member of Knesset Issawi Frej (Meretz) submitted an emergency petition to the High Court asking that Eliyahu be disqualified, since "election of a racist like Eliyahu to the position would be the start of the destruction of values in the State of Israel". The High Court rejected the petition based on technicalities. In December 2013, Eliyahu petitioned the High Court against the Attorney General for using confidential information that was gathered as part of the failed criminal investigation that Weinstein sent to the election committee in his attempt to prevent Eliyahu from running.

In October 2014, Eliyahu failed to win election as Chief Rabbi of Jerusalem, losing out to Shlomo Amar by a vote of 28 to 18 in the municipality's 48-member electorate.

In June 2015, Eliyahu was involved in investigating the allegations of sexual abuse committed by self-styled Safed " kabbalist" Ezra Sheinberg against 14 women who came to him for marital therapy. Eliyahu brought the case to the attention of the Israel Police, and in 2018 Sheinberg was sentenced to more than 7 years in prison.

In November 2021, Haredi children's author Chaim Walder was the subject of a Haaretz exposé, accused of engaging in sexual abuse of minors and married women who came to him to receive therapy over a 25-year period. Eliyahu convened a beth din (rabbinical court) in Safed, encouraging Walder's victims to come forward and submit testimony against him, and found him "guilty beyond any doubt". On 16 December, Eliyahu summoned Walder to the beth din. Ten days later, Haaretz reported that the Israel Police had opened an investigation into Walder, but that he had not yet been questioned. The following day, Walder was found dead of a self-inflicted gunshot wound adjacent to his son's grave in the Segula Cemetery in Petah Tikva. He left a suicide note wherein he professed his innocence, beginning it with

I went to invite Yehuda Silman and Shmuel Eliyahu to a Torah trial in heaven.

Upon hearing of this, Eliyahu said

We heard with pain about the suicide of Chaim Walder. It is a pity that he chose this path, we suggested to him that he repair what he damaged. That he apologize to the victims. That he change his ways. That no more women be harmed. [Walder] could have taught many through repentance ... We are strengthening the many victims at this difficult time, their lives take precedence over his life.

== Views ==
=== Government of Israel ===
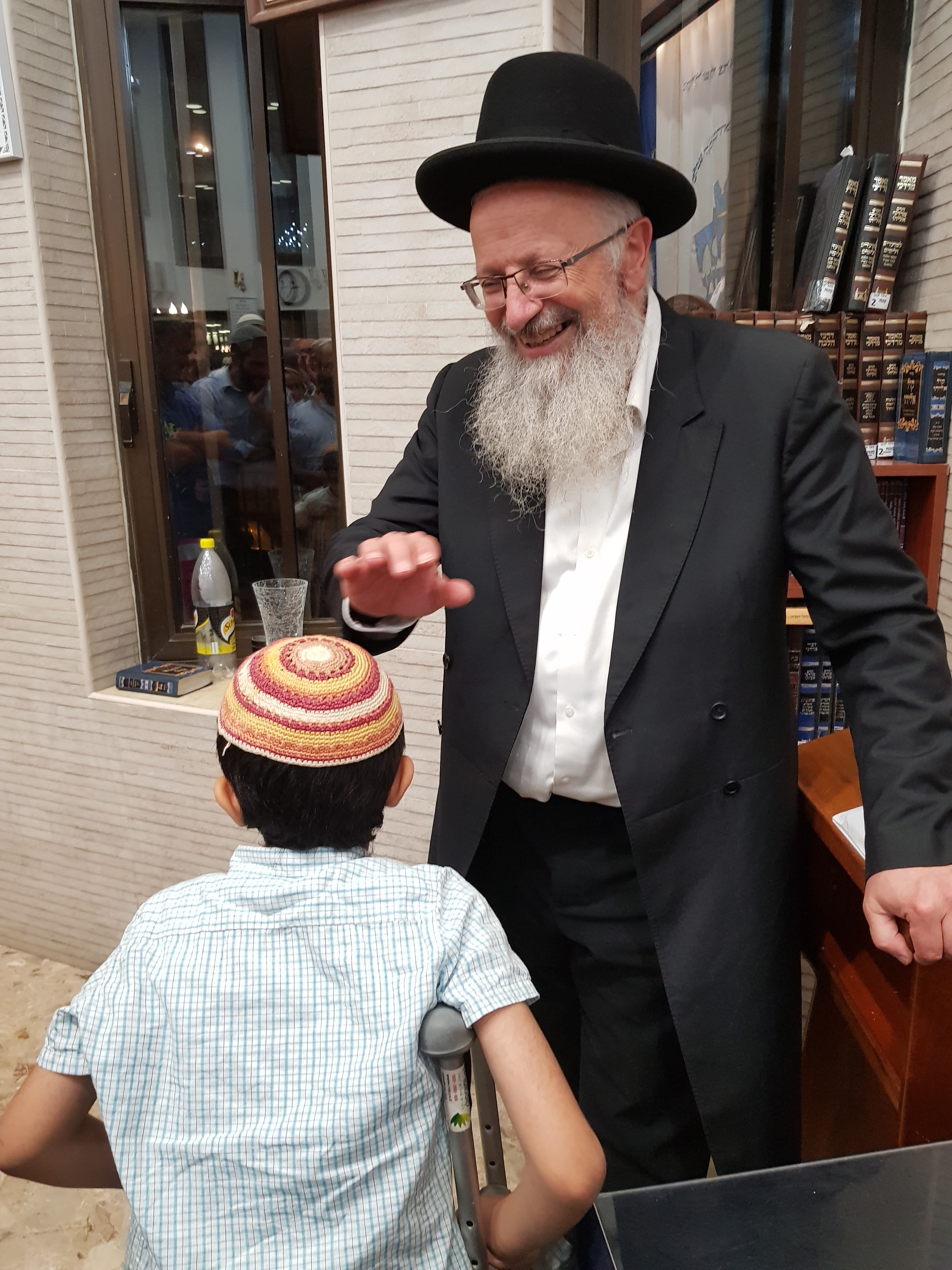
Eliyahu at Heichal Yaakov, his father's Jerusalem synagogue

In 2008, in the wake of a corruption investigation that targeted Ehud Olmert, Eliyahu issued a pamphlet entitled "A Religious Prime Minister – It's Possible", in which he wrote

So what shall we do? Elect another prime minister without faith? Another one without credibility? Another one without values? ... When will we wake up and realize that we need a prime minister with a kippa (religious head covering)?

In 2022, Eliyahu was instrumental in convincing Knesset Member Idit Silman to abandon the Yamina party, an act that led to a coalition crisis in the Bennett–Lapid government, which Eliyahu considered to be too accommodating to Arabs and hostile to the Chief Rabbinate. In April of that year, Eliyahu and his wife Tova met with Silman in their Jerusalem home to congratulate her on her decision.

Eliyahu is close to Itamar Ben-Gvir, leader of the far-right Otzma Yehudit party. Eliyahu's son Amihai, a member of that party, was elected to the Knesset in 2022, assuming the role of Heritage Minister.

=== Arabs and Palestinians ===
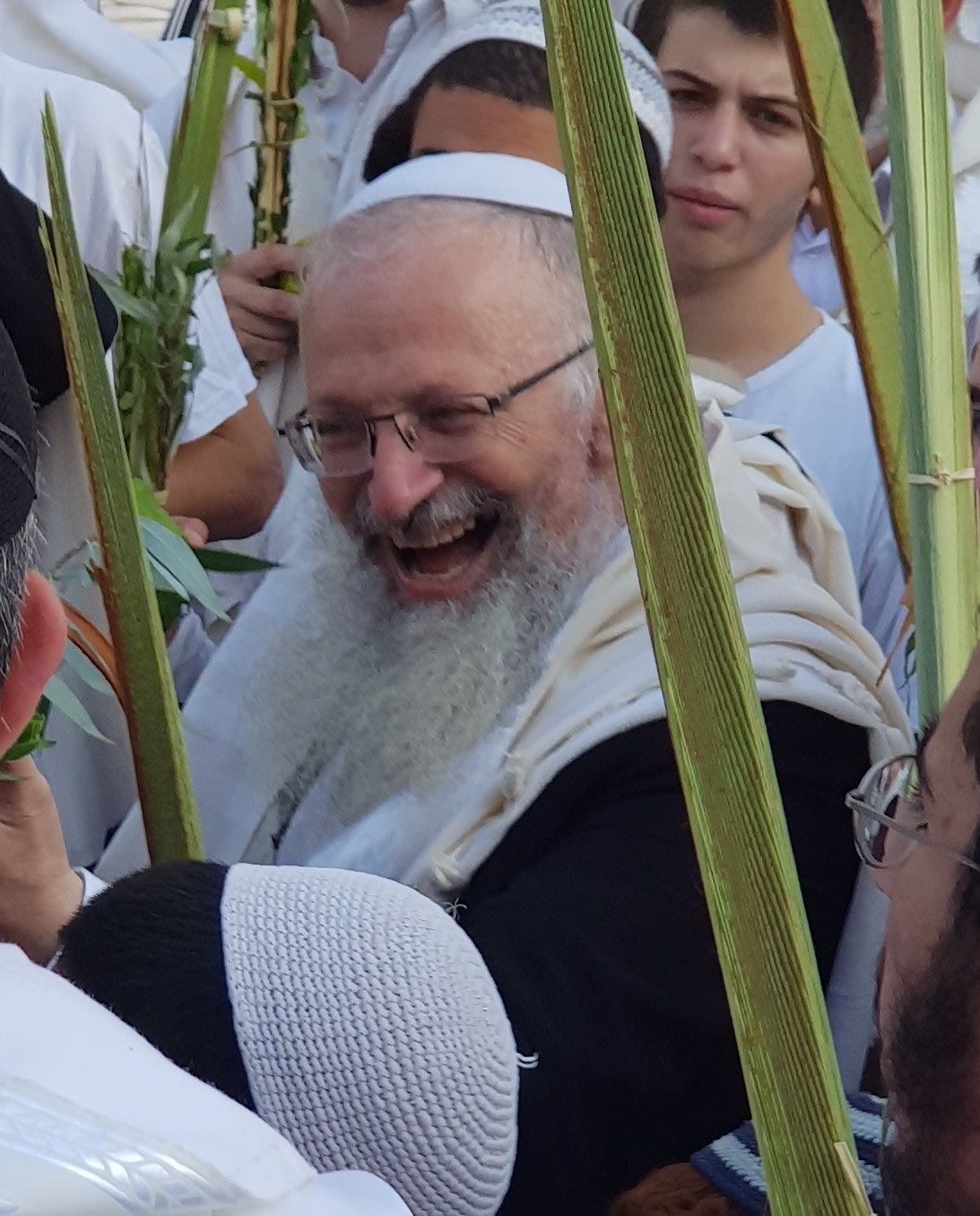
Eliyahu at the Western Wall during the holiday of Sukkot in 2018

In May 2007, Eliyahu advocated "carpet bombing the general area from which the Kassams were launched, regardless of the price in Palestinian life". He further stated, "If they don't stop after we kill 100, then we must kill 1,000. If they do not stop after 1,000, then we must kill 10,000. If they still don't stop, we must kill 100,000, even a million. Whatever it takes to make them stop."

In March 2008, Eliyahu called for "state-sanctioned revenge" against Arabs. According to Haaretz, Eliyahu wrote an article for the newsletter Eretz Yisrael Shelanu ("Our Land of Israel"), wherein he proposed "hanging the children of the terrorist who carried out the attack in the Mercaz Harav yeshiva from a tree".

In 2009, Eliyahu was involved in publishing the conspiracy theory pamphlet On Either Side of the Border, in cooperation with the Union of Orthodox Jewish Congregations of America (OU). The OU later asserted that its connection with the pamphlet was unauthorized by senior management. The pamphlet, citing the personal account of a recent convert to Judaism who had previously been a member of the Lebanese organisation Hezbollah, asserts that the Pope and the Cardinals of the Roman Catholic Church allegedly help organize tours of Auschwitz for Hezbollah members, in order to teach them how to wipe out Jews. The pamphlet was distributed to IDF troops. Danny Orbach, a Harvard-based Israeli historian, said that the pamphlet, supposedly written by a Lebanese, actually contains gross factual errors that no Arab could have made. In addition, there are also numerous other blatant geographical and cultural mistakes in the pamphlet, proving that the author is in reality a Haredi Jew from Israel who knows very little about the Arab world. Orbach's conclusion is that Eliyahu took part in a forgery, clearly in order to propagate hatred against Arabs and Muslims. Eliyahu failed to answer the accusations, but his spokesman vouched for the authenticity of the pamphlet in a conversation with Haaretz. Furthermore, Eliyahu had widely quoted from the pamphlet in a subsequent article.

In December 2010, Eliyahu spearheaded a letter, signed by 50 rabbis, which urged Jewish Israelis to refrain from renting housing to Arabs. Circulation of the letter led to calls for Eliyahu's suspension, and for his prosecution on grounds of racial incitement. In July 2012, Israel's Ministry of Justice closed the investigation into allegations of incitement, on the grounds of lack of evidence that the statements could be attributed to Eliyahu.

In the wake of the 2023 Turkey–Syria earthquake, Eliyahu wrote an article in the Olam Katan (newsletter), in which he stated that the event, which he compared to the biblical story of the crossing of the Red Sea, was a divine punishment to Syria, which

... abused its Jewish residents for hundreds of years in the blood libels of Damascus and others; which invaded Israel three times in order to kill and destroy

and therefore deserved no pity. As for Turkey, which suffered significantly more casualties, he accused it of having defamed the State of Israel, and "everything that happens, happens in order to cleanse the world and make it better." World Jewish Congress head Ron Lauder said that he was "aghast and appalled" at Eliyahu's words. Avraham Stav and Yehuda Gilad declared that Eliyahu's statements were not consistent with the teachings of the Torah.

=== Jerusalem ===
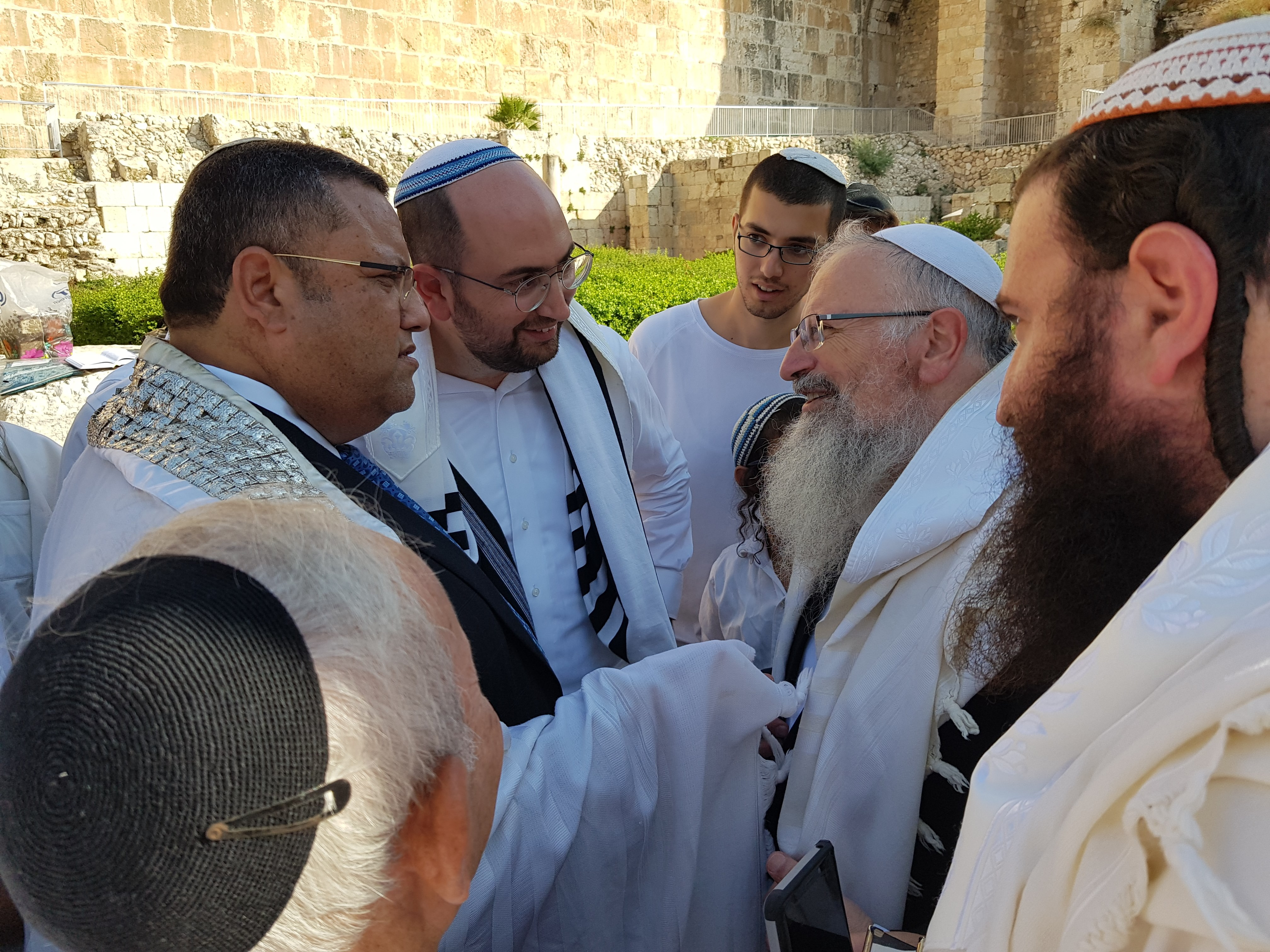
Eliyahu with future Jerusalem mayor Moshe Lion (left) in 2018 after the Hallel prayer adjacent to Robinson's Arch.

Following an address in December 2017 in which U.S. President Donald Trump recognized Jerusalem as the capital of Israel and announced plans to relocate the U.S. embassy there from its current location in Tel Aviv, Eliyahu organized a joint letter signed by 250 Israeli Orthodox rabbis praising Trump's historic proclamation, stating, "You will be remembered in the history of the Jewish people."

On Jerusalem Day in 2022, Eliyahu ordered a large turnout for an annual flag march, saying that anything less would embolden the Palestinians in the wake of a recent spate of attacks against Israelis. The following day, the U.S. State Department in the Biden administration revoked Eliyahu's visa to enter the United States. While no explanation was given for this, Israeli officials surmised that it was due to Eliyahu's statements regarding Arabs. A spokesman for Eliyahu blamed the action on Reformist and anti-Zionist elements.
