= 2008 Jerusalem yeshiva attack =

2008 school mass shooting in Jerusalem

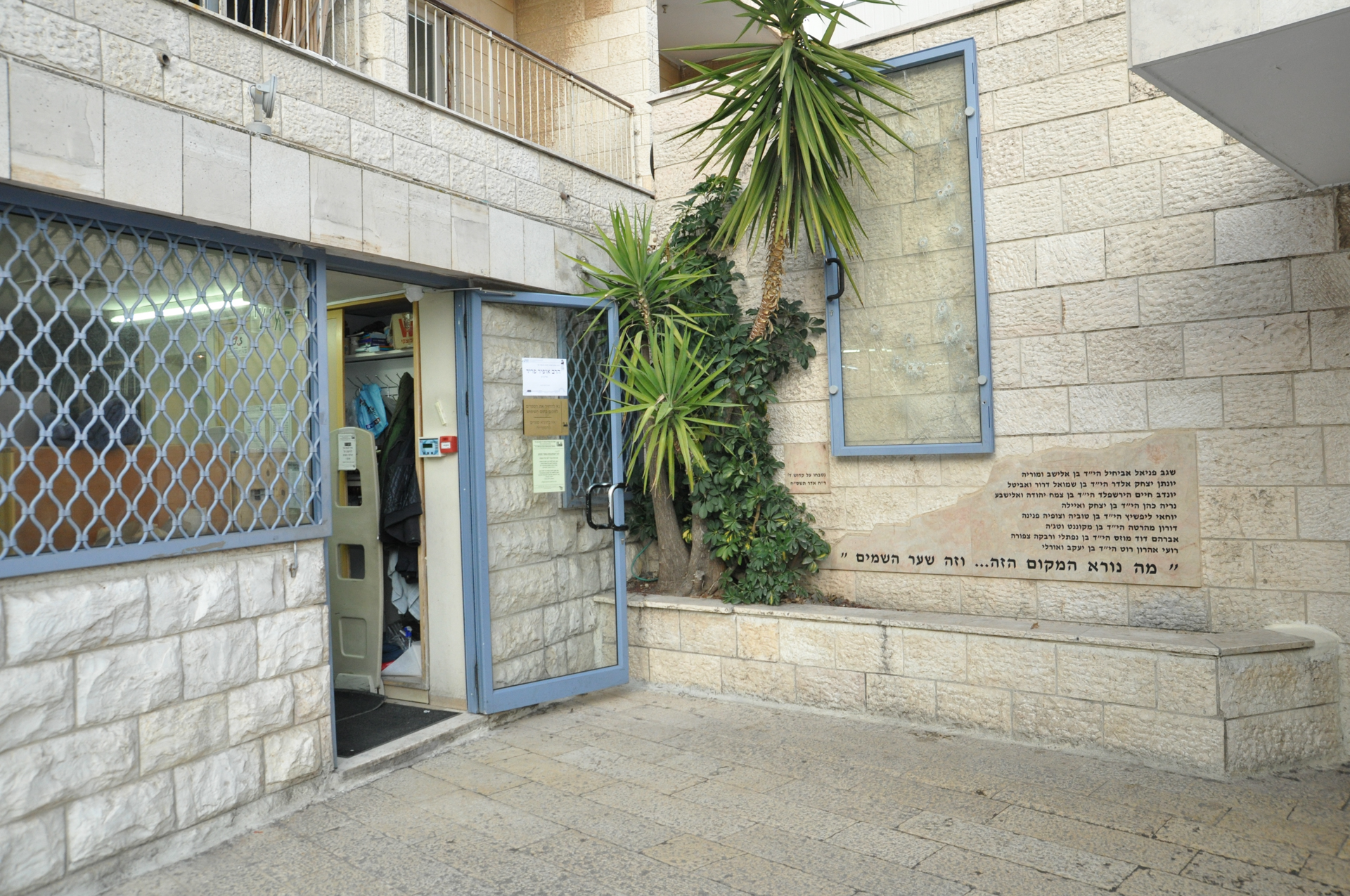
- Memorial for the victims at the entrance to the library at Mercaz HaRav

- The attack site
- Location: 31°47′16″N 35°11′49″E; The Mercaz HaRav yeshiva at Kiryat Moshe, West Jerusalem
- Date: 6 March 2008; 8:36 pm – 8:56 pm (GMT+2)
- Attack type: Mass shooting, school shooting
- Weapon: AK-47
- Deaths: 9 (including the perpetrator)
- Injuries: 11
- Assailant: 1 (Alaa Abu Dheim)
- Defenders: Yitzhak Dadon and David Shapira

On 6 March 2008, a lone Palestinian terrorist shot multiple students at the Mercaz HaRav yeshiva, a religious school in West Jerusalem. Eight students and the assailant were killed. Eleven more were wounded, five of them in serious to critical condition.

The attack took place when the students were about to start a Purim celebration. It began at 8:30 p.m. local time and ended sixteen minutes late, stopped by Mercaz HaRav student Yitzhak Dadon and off-duty IDF Captain David Shapira, who killed the perpetrator with their personal firearms.

== The shooting ==
The terrorist entered the courtyard of the yeshiva at the main entrance, put down the box and took out the weapon, and opened fire on a group of students from the Yashlatz yeshiva high school and Mercaz HaRav who were standing at the entrance, killing three of them. He then went into the yeshiva library and fired at the students there, killing five and wounding nine, three of them seriously. Seventeen students managed to escape into an adjacent classroom and blocked the door with a heavy table. He fired as many as 500–600 rounds.

Ten minutes after the shooting began, two police officers, one male and one female, arrived on the scene. The policewoman stopped a nearby passenger bus and prevented it from approaching, while the policeman entered the courtyard with a rifle. Dheim noticed him through the glass door of the yeshiva library and shot at him, but the officer, not knowing the precise source of the fire and afraid of harming innocents, did not return the fire and took cover. Immediately after the police arrived, Captain David Shapira, a graduate of the yeshiva and an officer in the Israel Defense Forces who lived nearby but was not on duty at the time, arrived at the scene with his M-16 rifle, while Yitzhak Dadon, a yeshiva student who had a gun, positioned himself on the roof of a nearby building. The police officer in the courtyard warned Shapira not to enter, but Shapira ignored him, and entered the building near the library door and positioned himself in a nearby corridor. Sixteen minutes after the shooting began, Dheim emerged from the library, and Dadon and Shapira opened fire, killing him.

== Victims ==
The 8 victims killed were:

- Segev Peniel Avihail, 15, of Neve Daniel;
- Neria Cohen, 15, of Jerusalem;
- Yonatan Yitzhak Eldar, 16, of Shilo;
- Yehonadav Haim Hirschfeld, 18, of Kokhav Hashahar;
- Yohai Lifshitz, 17, of Jerusalem;
- Doron Meherete, 26, of Ashdod;
- Avraham David Moses, 16, of Efrat;
- Ro'i Roth, 18, of Elkana.

== Assailant ==
The assailant, Alaa Abu Dheim

The gunman, Alaa Abu Dheim, (Arabic: علاء أبو دهيم, Hebrew: עלא אבו-דהיים) was from the Arab neighborhood of Jabel Mukaber in East Jerusalem, who, according to his family, worked as a driver for a private company that made deliveries to the yeshiva. This was later denied by the head of the yeshiva and police.

Abu Dheim, like other Arab residents of East Jerusalem who choose not to have Israeli citizenship, carried an Israeli identity card that granted him freedom of movement and travel throughout Israel. On 5 January 2009, the Israeli High Court of Justice authorized the demolition of Abu Dheim's family home.

=== Motive ===
Although Abu Dhaim left behind no statement describing his motive, his sister, Iman Abu Dhaim, told the Associated Press that he had been radicalized by the violence in Gaza, where 126 Palestinians were killed by Israeli forces from Wednesday through Monday, in response to rocket fire from Palestinian militant groups based in Gaza.

According to journalist Ian Black, the attack seemed intended to send the message that Israeli attacks on its enemies, either in Gaza, Lebanon or Syria would not go unanswered. The seminary is identified with the spiritual leadership of the Jewish settlement movement in the West Bank, and especially with Gush Emunim. Jerusalem may have been chosen as there had been no attacks in the city during 2007.

=== Claims of responsibility ===
Hezbollah television network Al-Manar reported that a group calling itself Galilee Liberators Brigades—the Martyrs of Imad Mughniyeh has claimed responsibility for the attack, raising the possibility that the shooting was in retaliation for the assassination of Imad Mughniyeh. Israel had previously denied responsibility for that assassination.

Hamas praised the attack on Thursday but did not claim responsibility for it. On Friday an anonymous phone call to the Reuters news agency took responsibility on Hamas's behalf. However, Fawzi Barhoum, a senior Hamas spokesman in Gaza, said that no claim was official unless made in a written statement signed by the military wing of Hamas.

== Reaction ==
=== Israeli ===
Prime Minister Ehud Olmert called the attack "horrible". Olmert also said that the Mercaz Harav yeshiva had produced, "the finest soldiers for many generations; people who have realized the Zionist faith. This yeshiva—which was founded by Rabbi Abraham Isaac Kook—has educated and nurtured tradition and legacy, as part of Israel's resilience." A spokesman for Olmert said Israel would act after proper investigation and deliberation, and he condemned those, like Hamas, who celebrated the killings with parades in Gaza. "That Hamas calls this a heroic act, and praises it, this exposes them for what they are", the Olmert spokesman said. However in their grief Olmert was not welcomed to visit the place of Torah learning. A yeshiva spokesperson told Ehud Olmert that he was not welcome at that time, saying it wanted to "save him and us the embarrassment."

Dalia Itzik of the ruling Kadima party, speaker of the Knesset and acting president while Shimon Peres is overseas, called for the demolition of the mourning tent for the killer and the demolition of his family's home.

Thousands in Israel mourned the deaths of those killed, observing Jewish traditions of mourning, with the murdered victims buried on Friday.

A Channel 1 report that three alumni of the yeshiva were planning a revenge attack against a senior Arab official affiliated with a mosque on Jerusalem's Temple Mount, allegedly with permission from several rabbis, was dismissed by Public Security Minister Avi Dichter and the Shin Bet as baseless following their investigation. National Religious Party's MK Zevulun Orlev said he suspected the allegations were an attempt to "blemish religious Zionism."

Education Minister Yuli Tamir, who made a condolence visit to the yeshiva two days after the shooting, left and later claimed '[I] was kicked in the back twice, spat at, and verbally attacked by dozens of youths outside building', they called me 'murderer' and they said that "the Left is to blame for everything." She had said at the Yeshivah itself "This [hostility to the left as she saw it] reminded me of the days before (former Prime Minister Yitzhak) Rabin's murder. It's unfortunate that there is a public which cannot put limits from [sic] itself. I only came to pay my respect to the murdered, not to engage in politics." The next morning Yuli Tamir threatened to cut off funding for the yeshiva, citing a lack of "democratic values".

The Israel Football Association called for a minute's silence prior to the weekend's football matches, though it was marred in Sakhnin where some supporters of the Arab Bnei Sakhnin team booed. Bnei Sakhnin F.C. spokesman Mundar Haleileh said his club honored the moment of silence, "but we don't have full control over all fans. The association made the decision, and perhaps mixing politics with soccer is a matter to be discussed."

On 17 March, hundreds of activists attacked Arab homes in the east Jerusalem neighborhood Jebl Mukaber in an attempt to raze the house of the family of the gunman. For three hours, the activists chanted "revenge, revenge", vandalized property of the Arab village (which the police tried to prevent), and clashed with the police, whom they accused of "guarding the murderers." Many of the protesters were part of the settler movement and carried signs with slogans such as "Expel the Arab Enemy" and "The Land of Israel for the Jewish People" while others shouted "kill the Arabs". Despite a heavy police blockade at the entrance to Jebl Mukaber and a massive deployment of security forces in the area, the marchers managed to enter the village, stone residents' homes and damage a couple of cars belonging to villagers. The police declared the demonstration illegal, and finally forced the protesters to leave.

At a memorial event one month after the attack, former Sephardi Chief Rabbi Mordechai Eliyahu told an audience of around 1,000 people that, in response to the attack, the government should establish a yeshiva or Jewish township for each life lost. He added "Even when we seek revenge, it is important to make one thing clear – the life of one yeshiva boy is worth more than the lives of 1,000 Arabs." However, other National Religious voices were more moderate. In the same one-month commemoration event, the Chief Rabbi of Ramat Gan, Rabbi Yaacov Ariel, reminded his audience:

We do not seek revenge, only retaliation ... we are against killing innocent people or harming children.

The Israeli human rights group B'Tselem released a statement condemning the attack which read: "B'Tselem severely condemns the Palestinian terror attack that took place in a yeshiva (religious school) in Jerusalem, in which 8 Israeli civilians, including 4 minors were killed and many other persons were injured. Attacks aimed at civilians are immoral, inhuman, and illegal."

=== Palestinian ===
Mahmoud Abbas, President of the Palestinian National Authority, stated "We condemn all attacks against civilians, be they Palestinian or Israeli."

The attack was praised by Hamas and, according to a subsequent poll, was supported by 84 percent of the Palestinian population, the highest result showing support for violence in 15 years, which the pollster concluded was the result of recent actions by Israel in Gaza and the West Bank. It was condemned in official statements by various countries around the world.

=== Supranational ===
- United Nations: The United Nations Security Council failed to agree on a condemnation of the attack due to opposition from Libya which wanted to link the condemnation to a resolution calling for censure of Israel over its actions in Gaza the previous week.

=== International ===
- (Organisation of Islamic Cooperation) The Organisation of the Islamic Conference condemned the killings, saying it abhorred violence anywhere in the world.
- (Sweden) Swedish Minister for Foreign Affairs Carl Bildt, described the incident as "an unacceptable terrorist attack."
- United States President George W. Bush condemned the attack, and expressed his solidarity with the families of the victims and the people of Israel. Secretary of State Condoleezza Rice expressed her condolences on the attack. She also wrote that "The United States condemns tonight's act of terror and depravity." United States Democratic presidential candidate Senator Barack Obama (IL) phoned Israeli foreign minister Tzipi Livni while she was visiting the US. Obama expressed his condolences to the Israeli people and to the bereaved families in the wake of the terror attack in the Mercaz Harav Yeshiva. He also stressed Israel's right to defend itself and made it clear that both the US and Israel were interested in ensuring that Iran will not be acquiring nuclear weapons. United States Senator Hillary Clinton (D-NY), at the time a leading presidential candidate, said "My thoughts and prayers are with the victims and families who are suffering the loss and horror of this despicable act of terrorism. The United States and the international community must make clear that such deplorable acts of terrorism will not be tolerated and we must continue to stand with Israel in its fight against terror."
- Argentina's Foreign Ministry said: "Argentina's Government expresses our deep concern at the escalation of tensions and violence in the region and condemns the attack [...]" "Argentina urges for the cessation of violence ... this way will allow the negotiation process for a fair, global and durable peace"
- Canada's Minister of Foreign Affairs Maxime Bernier stated that "Canada condemns this terrorist act in the strongest possible terms. The attack does nothing to advance the Palestinian cause."
- (China) Chinese Foreign Ministry Spokesperson Qin Gang condemned the attack and expressed hope for the lessening of tensions in the Middle East.
- Slovenia, which held the Presidency of the Council of the European Union, issued a statement condemning the attack, and stating that "terrorist acts are unacceptable."
- France's Minister of Foreign Affairs Bernard Kouchner condemned the attack, and called for peace talks to continue despite the attack.
- Germany's Minister of Foreign Affairs Frank-Walter Steinmeier said that the attack horrified him, and expressed his sympathy to the families.
- (Georgia (country)) The Georgian Ministry of Foreign Affairs strongly condemned the attack, and expressed its profound condolences to the families.
- (India) The Indian Ministry for External Affairs condemned "the mindless terrorist attack" in which "eight young innocent Israeli lives were lost" and called for dialogue to end the "current cycle of violence".
- (Republic of Ireland) Ireland's Foreign Minister Dermot Ahern "strongly condemned the terrorist attack" and urged "all parties to end the spiral of violence."
- Masahiko Kōmura, the Japanese Minister for Foreign Affairs, said that "Japan expresses its condolences to the bereaved families as well as deepest sympathy for the people who were injured. Terrorism cannot be justified for any reason, and any attempt to justify it is unacceptable."
- (Jordan) Jordanian police dismantled a mourning tent erected outside the home of relatives of the shooter.
- Norway's Minister of Foreign Affairs Jonas Gahr Støre condemned the attack and expressed his sympathies to the families.
- (United Kingdom) British Prime Minister Gordon Brown condemned the attack, saying that it was "an attempt to strike a blow at the very heart of the peace process." Secretary of State for Foreign and Commonwealth Affairs David Miliband condemned the attack and expressed his hope for a peaceful Middle East.

== Praise for the attack ==
The Palestinian National Authority daily newspaper, Al-Hayat al-Jadida, honored the shooter as a "martyr". The paper prominently placed a picture of the gunman on the front page, with the caption, "The Martyr Alaa Abu Dheim". In a front-page article on the killings, his act was again defined as a "martyrdom-achieving" action. Hamas spokesman Sami Abu Zuhri stated that "This heroic attack in Jerusalem is a normal response to the crimes of the occupier and its murder of civilians".

In a poll taken two weeks later by the Palestinian Center for Policy and Survey Research, 84 percent of Palestinians supported the attack on the Mercaz Harav yeshiva. The pollster, Mr. Shikaki was "shocked" and said the result was the single highest support for an act of violence in his 15 years of polling. According to The New York Times, the pollster posited in his own words that recent Israeli actions had "led to despair and rage among average Palestinians who thirst for revenge", including the death of 130 people as a result of attacks on Gaza, the killing of four militants in an undercover operation in Bethlehem and plans to expand several Israeli settlements in the West Bank.

According to The Jerusalem Post, in March 2008, Abdel Bari Atwan, editor-in-chief of Arab language newspapers, as well as a London based Pan-Arab paper, said the murder of 15-year-old students "was justified" and that the celebrations in Gaza following the murders symbolized "the courage of the Palestinian nation" and "marks Israel's destruction." Conversely in his English language appearances on BBC Dateline and Dutch television, and in his book he stated "We have to learn to live together in peace and co-operation in a multi-cultural society in one democratic secular state for two people. One state for both peoples governed by a representative democracy and on an equal footing. We manage it here in London, it is working in South Africa, and there is enough room for everyone in Palestine. I respect the Jewish people and their religion. I do not want to destroy Israel but I do want to end racism and the current Apartheid system."

== See also ==
- List of school-related attacks
- Ma'alot massacre
- Hebrew University bombing
- Avivim school bus bombing
- Jerusalem bulldozer attack
- Jerusalem BMW attack
- 2014 Jerusalem synagogue attack
