= December 2010 Israeli rabbi letter controversy =

In December 2010, a scandal erupted surrounding the appearance of two open letters, signed by a number of Israeli rabbis, that called for a social boycott of Arabs in Israel. Although the letters sparked considerable outrage, evoking condemnation from prominent Israeli and American Jews and others, a poll showed that 44 percent of Israeli society supported the letters' messages, while 48 percent opposed it.

== Letters ==
=== Rabbis' letter ===
The rabbis' letter was a psak din (religious ruling) signed by an estimated 50 rabbis, that urged Israeli landowners not to rent apartments to Arabs, or any other non-Jews. The letter was initiated by the chief rabbi of Safed, Shmuel Eliyahu. On January 2, 2011, Eliyahu was summoned to an Israeli police interrogation on suspicion of incitement to racism, which is a crime in Israel, but he refused to answer the summons.

Many of the rabbis who signed the letter were municipal rabbis, state employees in charge of religious services, who receive salaries paid for by the taxpayer. Among the signers were rabbis from Rishon LeZion, Ramat HaSharon, Herzliya, Kfar Saba and Holon (suburbs of Tel Aviv); from Jerusalem; and from other towns and settlements.

According to a poll conducted by the Harry S. Truman Institute for the Advancement of Peace at the Hebrew University of Jerusalem, a narrow plurality of Jewish Israelis were opposed to the rabbis' call not to rent to Arabs: 48 percent opposed the statement, and 44 percent supported it.

=== Rebbetzins' letter ===
The second letter was released on December 28, 2010, by the Lehava organization. It was signed by at least 27 rebbetzins (rabbis' wives). It urged young Jewish women to not date Arabs, and to not work at locations where non-Jews might be present.

== Response ==
=== Opposition ===
==== Politicians and activists ====
- Benjamin Netanyahu, Prime Minister of Israel, and leader of the Likud party: On December 7, 2010, Netanyahu condemned the letter in a speech before the International Bible Contest for adults in Jerusalem. He stated: "How would we feel if we were told not to sell an apartment to Jews? We would protest, and we protest now when it is said of our neighbors"; and: "Such things cannot be said - not about Jews, and not about Arabs. They cannot be said in any democratic country, and especially not in a Jewish and democratic one. The state of Israel rejects these sayings."
- Ehud Barak, Deputy Prime Minister, Defense Minister, and leader of the Labor party: Barak stated that, "The rabbis' letters is part of a racist tidal wave threatening to sweep Israeli society into dark and dangerous zones. The Labor Party under my authority is working to draw all of Israel's citizens together, in the spirit of the Declaration of Independence."
- Reuven Rivlin, Knesset Speaker (Likud): Rivlin said to Haaretz in an interview that, "In my opinion, their statement shames the Jewish people... I see this general statement as an embarrassment to the Jewish people, and another nail in the coffin of Israeli democracy. Let me make this absolutely clear: I believe these people do the most damage to the state of Israel." He continued: "Israel can justify its faith in itself as a Jewish state only if it wields its democratic powers totally and unreservedly. This moral right will be taken from us if we prove to the world that, when it comes to democracy, we deny anything which does not suit us from a Jewish point of view." He also urged the attorney general to determine whether the letter constitutes the crime of incitement.
- Avishay Braverman, Minorities Affairs Minister: Braverman had called for Eliyahu's ouster as early as November 18, 2010. On December 12, 2010, Braverman threatened to push for his party, Labor, to quit the coalition, stating that, "There is a hatred of foreigners. The nation is turning into Iran following the rabbis' letter."
- The Association for Civil Rights in Israel demanded that Prime Minister Benjamin Netanyahu condemn the letter (which he later did), and take disciplinary action against state-employed signatories of the letter, saying in a statement that "Rabbis who are civil servants have an obligation to the entire public, including Israel's Arab citizens. It is unthinkable that they would use their public status to promote racism and incitement."

==== Religious organizations ====
- Rabbi Aharon Lichtenstein, dean of Yeshivat Har Etzion, and a major Religious Zionist rabbinical figure: Lichtenstein wrote a lengthy and erudite letter of opposition.
- Rabbis Yosef Shalom Eliashiv and Aharon Leib Shteinman, the leading Ashkenazic Haredi rabbis in Israel: Eliashiv and Steinman strongly condemned the edict.
- U.S. rabbis: Numerous American rabbis also condemned the letter. An online petition for rabbis posted by the New Israel Fund on December 10, 2010, had nearly 1000 rabbis as signatories by December 16. The petition stated that "Am Yisrael (The Jewish People) know(s) the sting of discrimination, and we still bear the scars of hatred. When those who represent the official rabbinic leadership of the State of Israel express such positions, we are distressed by this Chillul HaShem (desecration of God's name)....Statements like these do great damage to our efforts to encourage people to love and support Israel. They communicate to our congregants that Israel does not share their values, and they promote feelings of alienation and distancing." Notable American rabbis who signed the petition included Conservative Rabbi Julie Schonfeld, executive vice president of the Conservative Rabbinical Assembly; Reform Rabbi David Saperstein, the director of the Religious Action Center of the Union for Reform Judaism); and Orthodox Rabbis Avi Weiss, the leader of the Hebrew Institute of Riverdale, and Marc Angel. Signatories included members of all major American Jewish denominations. A separate condemnation was issued by the Orthodox Rabbinical Council of America.
- Israeli Masorti rabbis: Roughly 50 Masorti rabbis signed a counter-letter allowing Jews to rent to non-Jews, while 40 female Israeli Reform rabbis representing the Israel Movement for Progressive Judaism issued a counter-letter proclaiming "professional and social contacts" between Jews and non-Jews to be positive, and that "Jews who are confident in their Jewish identity do not have to fear contact with people from other nations," a statement also supported by the council's 50 male Reform rabbis The Reform rabbis also argued that the rebbetzins' attitude toward Israeli girls was "condescending", portrayed them as "weak", and perpetuated male chauvinism. Their counter-letter encouraged Israelis not to listen to "hate-mongers and fanatics".

==== Others ====
- A response letter was directed to the Israeli government by various Israeli academicians and artisans, criticizing the lax approach by the government to racial and religious incitement by rabbis, and calling for the prosecution of the original letter's signatories for incitement to racism. Among the signatories to the response letter were former politician Shulamit Aloni, author Yoram Kaniuk, sculptor Dani Karavan, and politicians Zehava Gal-On and Naomi Hazan.
- Holocaust survivors condemned the letter. Noah Flug, the chairman of the International Association of Holocaust Survivors, stated that, "As someone who suffered as a Jew and underwent the Holocaust, I remember the Nazis throwing Jews out of their apartments and city centres in order to create ghettos. I remember how they wrote on benches that no Jews were allowed, and, of course, it was prohibited to sell or rent to Jews. We thought that in our country, this wouldn't happen."
- Public opinion: When a poll was conducted of Jewish Israelis' reaction to the letters denouncing those who rent or sell homes to non-Jews, 48 per cent of Israeli Jews opposed the rabbis' call, while 44 per cent supported it.

=== Support ===
- Eliyahu was supported by members of the Knesset Ya'akov Katz and Uri Ariel of the National Union, who condemned the "summoning to interrogation of the great leaders of Israel", and the "persecution of the Torah and its rabbis". National Union MK Michael Ben-Ari proposed a bill (originally drafted by former MK Shmuel Halpert of Agudat Yisrael) that would give rabbis who work for the state immunity from prosecution from actions and pronouncements in connection with leadership duties or religious pronouncements, similar to the parliamentary immunity enjoyed by MKs.

== See also ==
- Love jihad - Similar concerns about interaction of Hindus and Muslims in India raised by Hindu nationalists.
