= 2008 Jerusalem bulldozer attack =

Vehicle-ramming attack in Jerusalem

Jerusalem bulldozer attack
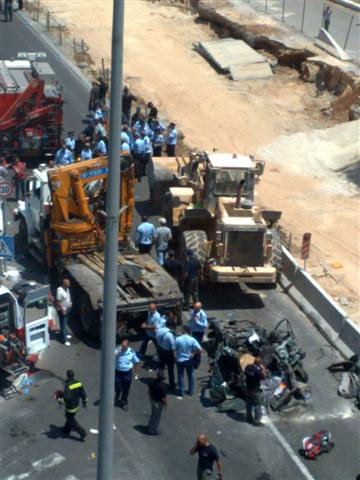
- The attack aftermath

- The attack site
- Location: 31°47′18″N 35°12′23″E; Jerusalem
- Date: July 2, 2008; 18 years ago 11:55 a.m. – 12:10 p.m. (UTC+3)
- Attack type: Vehicle-ramming attack
- Deaths: 3 civilians (+1 attacker)
- Injuries: 40
- Assailant: Hussam Taysir Duwait

At 12:00 noon on July 2, 2008, three civilians were killed and at least 30 pedestrians were wounded when an Arab resident of East Jerusalem smashed into several cars on Jaffa Road in downtown Jerusalem in a police vehicle-ramming attack using a front-end loader, referred to as a bulldozer. Israeli government spokesman Mark Regev said that an inquiry indicated the attacker had been acting alone. A motive for the attack could not immediately be determined, but at the scene referred to the incident as a terrorist attack.

This attack was the second incident in 2008 in which an Israeli Arab committed a violent act in West Jerusalem while carrying an Israeli identity card (allowing for freedom of movement and travel throughout Israel), the first being the Mercaz HaRav massacre in early March 2008.

Three copycat attacks have occurred since then.

Israel protested to the UN Security Council, stating that the timing, in the middle of negotiations indicates the efforts to hurt Israelis and harm peace efforts.

== Attack ==
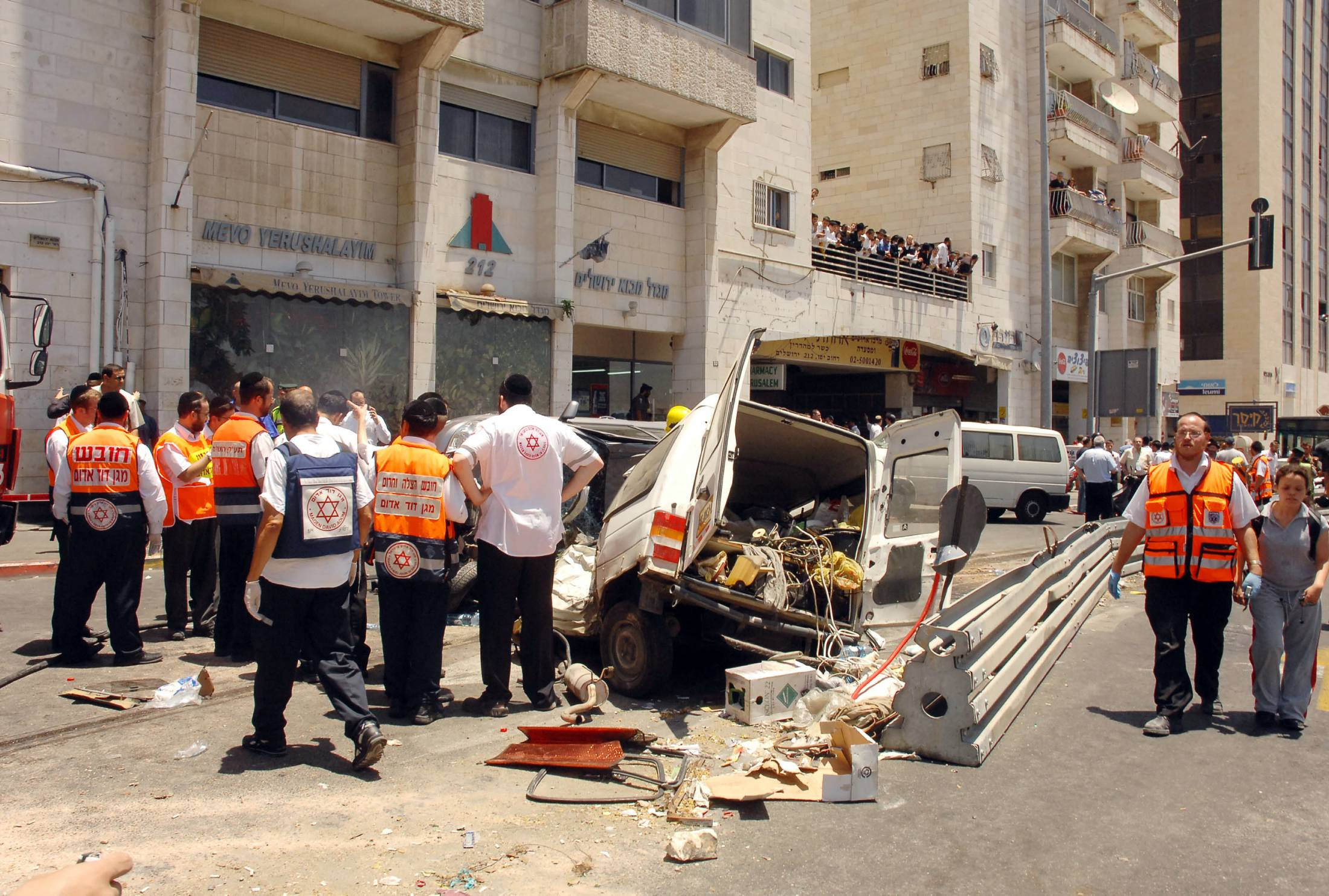
Damage caused by the attack

The attacker was identified as Hussam Taysir Duwait (also referred to as Hussam Duwiyat, Hossam Dawyyat, or erroneously as Jabr Duwait) Preliminary investigations suggest the Caterpillar 966 front-end loader was taken from a nearby construction site where Duwait worked. The perpetrator then drove the vehicle against traffic, before hitting an Egged public bus near the city's old Central Bus Station. The impact flipped the bus onto its side, hitting nearby vehicles and pedestrians. The perpetrator, Hussam Taysir Duwait, was also heard yelling "Allahu Akbar" during the attack. After a traffic policewoman had shot the driver, the vehicle came to a halt but then started again and crushed another car, killing another person.

At the point when the vehicle had stopped for the first time, three men had climbed up to the cabin: A 20-year-old off-duty soldier from Jerusalem, Moshe Plesser, who had recently enlisted at the Israel Defense Forces, an unnamed policeman, and Oron Ben Shimon, an armed civilian and manager of a regional security firm. According to Oron, while he was struggling with the driver inside the cabin, trying to get his feet off the accelerator and take over the wheel, he shouted at the soldier to shoot the driver. The soldier then grabbed Oron's handgun and killed Duwait with three shots to the head at point blank range. After the vehicle had immediately come to a halt again, motorcycle policeman Eli Mizrahi climbed the cabin and fired two more shots.

Haaretz quotes the soldier as saying that "I got closer to the bulldozer, the whole time looking for my weapon to shoot him." Coincidentally, the soldier is the brother-in-law of Captain David Shapira, the paratrooper officer who shot and killed the perpetrator in the Mercaz HaRav massacre.

The moments during which the perpetrator was shot and killed have been filmed from at least two different angles, which accounts for the greater level of directly available descriptive detail in comparison to the original attack which is documented only through eyewitnesses on the scene as well as images that were taken mostly after the incident itself.

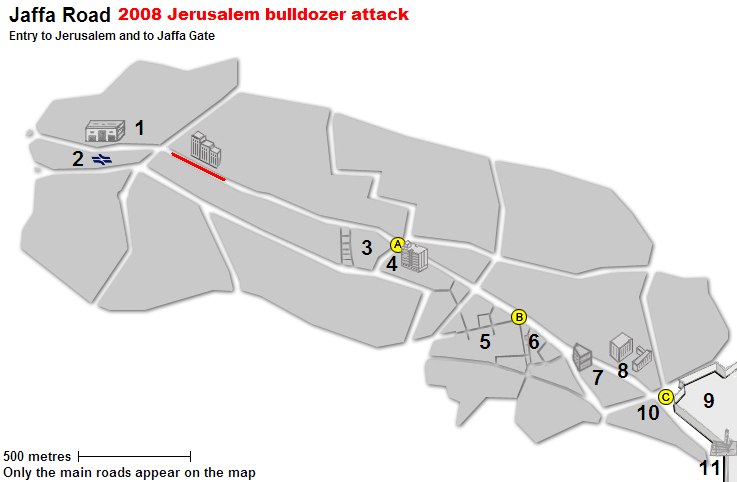

One witness was quoted as saying that Duwait was armed and "shooting at a police officer".

=== Fatalities ===
- Batsheva Unterman, 33, of Jerusalem – a kindergarten teacher, and the wife of Ido Unterman, grandson of former Chief rabbi Isser Yehuda Unterman. She was in her car at the scene of the attack. Her 6-month-old daughter was pulled from the car just before it was hit.
- Elizabeth Goren-Friedman, 54, of Jerusalem – originally of Austria, Elizabeth Goren-Friedman worked as a teacher in a school for the blind.
- Jean Relevy, 68, of Jerusalem – an air-conditioner technician who lived in the Gilo neighborhood.

== Perpetrator ==
Duwait, a 32-year-old father of two from the East Jerusalem neighbourhood of Sur Baher, was carrying an Israeli identity card, and was hired by a local construction firm for the Jerusalem Light Rail.

Three Palestinian organizations took responsibility for the attack: the Al-Aqsa Martyrs' Brigades, the Galilee Freedom Battalion (Hebrew: גדודי חופשיי הגליל), and the Popular Front for the Liberation of Palestine. Despite the Palestinian claims of responsibility, Israeli police chief Dudi Cohen said the attacker appeared to be acting alone and that "it looks as if it was a spontaneous act." Some two hours after the attack, a Hamas spokesman said that the attack is "a natural response to Israeli aggression." Nevertheless, he stressed that Hamas did not know who was behind the attack.

Shimon Kokos, the lawyer of the perpetrator's family, said that Hussam "had not belonged to any militant organization and may have acted out of temporary insanity" and that, "had [he] not been killed during his rampage, it is doubtful whether he would have been judged fit to stand trial." "My son never spoke of plans to carry out such an attack, if he had I would have tried to prevent it," Duwait's father, Tayseer told The Media Line as police officers were about to question him.

A Jewish ex-girlfriend of Duwait, commented that "he really didn't hate Jews. The fact is that he was with me. It's insanity, but the motivation was not nationalist" and also that his bad temper may have been related to his "[smoking] a lot of drugs." Other people have gone on the record as well alleging regular drug abuse by Duwait, one neighbour saying that he was "a drug addict [...]. He'd shoot up all the time. [...] He was really just a junkie."

== Aftermath ==
Israeli Border Guard officers ordered the Duwait family to remove the mourning tent they erected in the neighborhood for their son. A Border Guard patrol passing through the area identified the construction of the tent and ordered the family to remove it. The family then disassembled the tent without any noted resistance. Two days after the attack, defense minister Ehud Barak ordered the demolition of Duwait's and Alaa Abu Dhein's (perpetrator of the Mercaz HaRav massacre) houses, as a stated deterrent against future attacks. Following the supreme court rejection of appeals by Duwait's family, his home was razed on April 7, 2009, the first such demolition since a military commission recommended against such action in 2005. During the demolition, police shot dead a Palestinian motorist who ran over and injured three police officers.

Duwait's house was demolished as a declared deterrent against future attacks.

== Copycat attacks ==
=== Bulldozer attack of July 22 ===
On July 22, another east Jerusalem Arab resident, Ghassan Abu Tir, rammed his bulldozer (this time it was a smaller backhoe loader) into cars and a bus on King David street in Jerusalem. He wounded 24 people, including one whose leg was partially severed. He was subsequently killed by a fusillade of gunfire from a Border Policeman and an armed pedestrian. The attack was seen as a copycat act of the July 2 attack, causing fears of repeated copycat acts in an emerging new terrorist tactic of vehicle ramming attacks. The attack happened just down the road from the hotel where Democratic presidential nominee Barack Obama was due to stay as part of a multi-country visit.

=== BMW attack ===
On September 22, 2008, Qassem Mughrabi, a resident of East Jerusalem, drove a black BMW into a group of off-duty soldiers standing on a Jerusalem street, injuring 19. Mughrabi was subsequently shot dead by one of the soldiers. Police spokesmen asserted the event was a terrorist attack, not a simple traffic collision.

=== Jerusalem police car attack ===
On March 5, 2009 two police officers were injured in Jerusalem when an Arab bulldozer driver overturned their police car and rammed it into a bus, before being fatally shot by police and an armed taxi driver. The attack occurred around 1 p.m. near the Malha shopping mall, on Menachem Begin Boulevard in southern Jerusalem. Police said that a copy of the Koran had been found in the bulldozer after the attack, and that the driver had not been carrying any identification. Israel Police and local residents later identified the man as Marei Radaydeh, a West Bank construction worker in his mid-20s who lived with his family in the east Jerusalem neighborhood of Beit Hanina. Radaydeh was married and had a daughter. Hamas praised the attack, calling it a "natural response" to Israel's demolition of Palestinian homes in Arab East Jerusalem and to Israel's military operations in the Gaza Strip.

== Official reactions ==
Involved parties

Israel:

- Prime Minister of Israel, Ehud Olmert mentioned that "There is no way to fence-off the Arabs of east Jerusalem and every home of a potential terrorist," and that "We need to stop the terror attacks carried out by east Jerusalem Arabs, and if that must be done through means of deterrence or the demolition of a home – then so be it." B'Tselem has condemned the plans as "illegal collective punishment."
- President of Israel, Shimon Peres expressed pride in the speedy actions of the soldier who fired at and killed the attacker.

Palestinian territories:

- Palestinian National Authority: Palestinian President Mahmoud Abbas condemned the attack stating "We want peaceful solutions through negotiations."
- Hamas government in the Gaza Strip praised the attack.

Supranational

- United Nations: Ban Ki-moon, United Nations Secretary-General expressed condolences to the relatives of the dead victims, and wishes for a speedy recovery to the injured.

International

- United Kingdom: British Foreign Secretary David Miliband condemned the attack, calling it a "horrific act."
- United States: President of the United States, George W. Bush spoke over the phone with Israeli PM Ehud Olmert to express his condolences with the people of Israel, for the "murderous terrorist attack."

== See also ==
- 2014 Jerusalem tractor attack
- List of terrorist incidents, 2008
- 2008 Jerusalem BMW attack
- Palestinian political violence
