= Avraham Shapira =

4th Ashkenazi Chief Rabbi of Israel

Rabbi Avraham Shapira אברהם שפירא
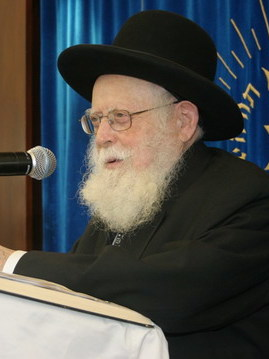
- Title: Ashkenazi Chief Rabbi of Israel

Personal life
- Born: c. 1910 Jerusalem
- Died: 27 September 2007 Jerusalem
- Buried: Mount of Olives Jewish Cemetery, Jerusalem

Religious life
- Religion: Judaism
- Denomination: Hardal

Jewish leader
- Began: 1983
- Ended: 1993

Avraham Shapira (Hebrew: אברהם אלקנה כהנא שפירא; c. 1910, Jerusalem – 27 September 2007) was a prominent rabbi in the Religious Zionist world. Shapira had been the head of the Rabbinical court of Jerusalem, and both a member and the head of the Supreme Rabbinic Court. He served as the Ashkenazi Chief Rabbi of Israel from 1983 to 1993. Shapira was the rosh yeshiva of Mercaz haRav in Jerusalem, a position he held since Rabbi Zvi Yehuda Kook died in 1982.

== Biography ==
Avraham Elkanah Shapira was born to a Jerusalemite family; his father was Rabbi Shlomo Zalman Shapira. As a child, he lived in the Jewish Quarter of Jerusalem's Old City.

In his youth, he studied at Etz Chaim Yeshiva in Jerusalem, later moving to the Hebron Yeshiva, where he studied under Rabbis Moshe Mordechai Epstein and Yechezkel Sarna. After his marriage, Rabbi Zvi Yehuda Kook invited him to join Mercaz HaRav yeshiva. He corresponded, in his youth, with the Chazon Ish, Rabbi Zvi Pesach Frank, Rabbi Yitzchak Zev Soloveitchik, and Rabbi Isser Zalman Meltzer.

In 1956, he was appointed as a member of the Jerusalem religious court by Chief Rabbi Yitzhak HaLevi Herzog. In 1971, he was appointed Av Beit Din.

Following the passing of Rabbi Zvi Yehuda Kook in 1982, Shapira was appointed as the Rosh Yeshiva (head of the yeshiva) of Yeshivat Merkaz HaRav, serving alongside Rabbi Shaul Yisraeli. For approximately 25 years, he delivered the central weekly Shiur Klali (general lecture) focusing on deep Talmudic analysis. Under his leadership, the yeshiva expanded significantly, becoming a major spiritual center and training thousands of students, community rabbis, and rabbinical judges (dayanim).

Shapira was elected Ashkenazi Chief Rabbi of Israel in 1983, serving alongside Rabbi Mordechai Eliyahu, who was elected Sefardi Chief Rabbi.

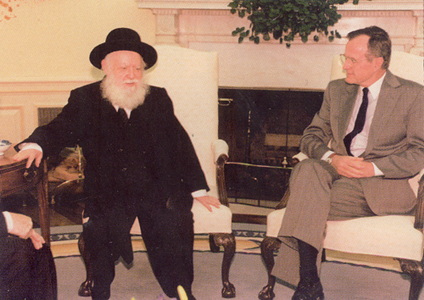
Rabbi Shapira with President George H. W. Bush in the Oval Office

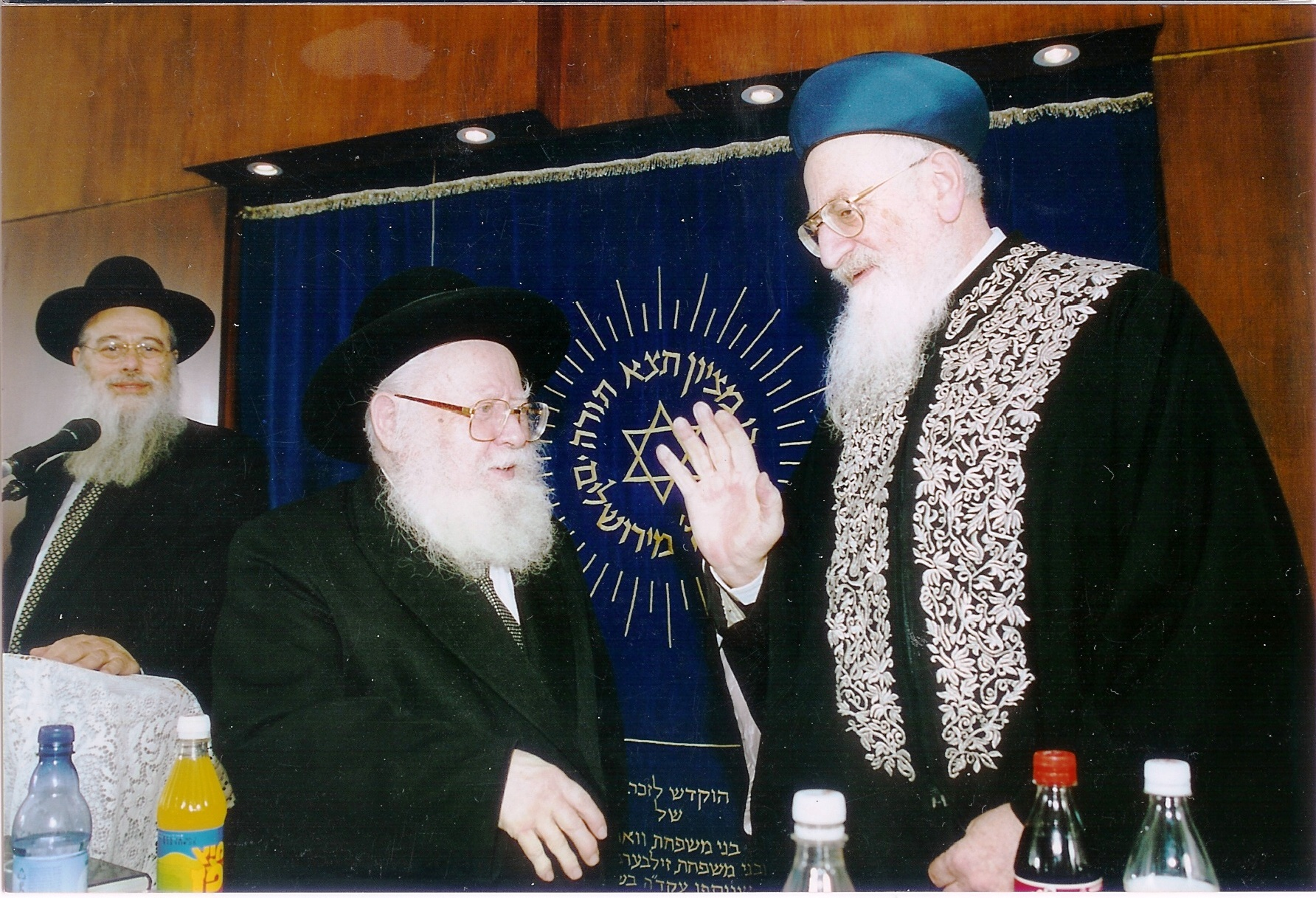
Rabbi Shapira together with Rabbi Mordechai Eliyahu at Yom Yerushalayim celebration at Mercaz HaRav

He died on the first day of Succot, 2007. Tens of thousands of people took part in his funeral procession on September 28, 2007. he was interred at the Mount of Olives Jewish Cemetery.

Shapira and his wife Penina had four sons. As per his will, his son Rabbi Yaakov Shapira was appointed Rosh Yeshiva of Mercaz HaRav after him.

== Views ==
As a leading posek (halachic authority) of the Religious Zionist movement, Shapira's worldview emphasized the spiritual and halachic significance of the State of Israel in the modern era. He strongly advocated for the authority of the Chief Rabbinate of Israel as the supreme spiritual and halachic guide for the entire nation. His numerous halachic rulings addressed contemporary public and private issues, seeking to integrate traditional Torah scholarship with the challenges of a modern Jewish state.

During the Oslo Accords, Shapira ruled that handing over territories violates Jewish law. He also called on soldiers to refuse orders to dismantle Jewish communities during the 2005 disengagement from Gaza.

== Published works ==
- Shiurey Maran HaGra Shapira – A summary of the rabbi's lectures, comprising six volumes
- Minchat Avraham – A collection of original halachic essays, comprising three volumes
- Morasha – Original essays on various topics

Jewish titles
Preceded by Shlomo Goren	Ashkenazi Chief Rabbi of Israel; 1983–1993	Succeeded by Yisrael Meir Lau
