= Yashlatz =

Yeshiva high school in Jerusalem, Israel

Coordinates: 31.7877°N 35.1963°E

- Hebrew: ישל"צ

Information
- Other name: Jerusalem Yeshiva for Youth; Hebrew: ישיבת ירושלים לצעירים
- Established: 9 August 1964; 61 years ago
- Head teacher: Rav Yerachmiel Weiss
- Gender: Boys
- Enrollment: c. 340
- Website: yashlatz.com/yashlatz

Yashlatz (Hebrew: ישל"צ, acronym for ישיבת ירושלים לצעירים Yeshivat Yerushalayim L’Tzeirim, "Jerusalem Yeshiva for Youth") is a religious Zionist yeshiva high school in Jerusalem. It was founded in 1964 by a student of the Orthodox rabbi Tzvi Yehuda HaCohen Kook to teach teenage boys in the Mercaz Harav community.

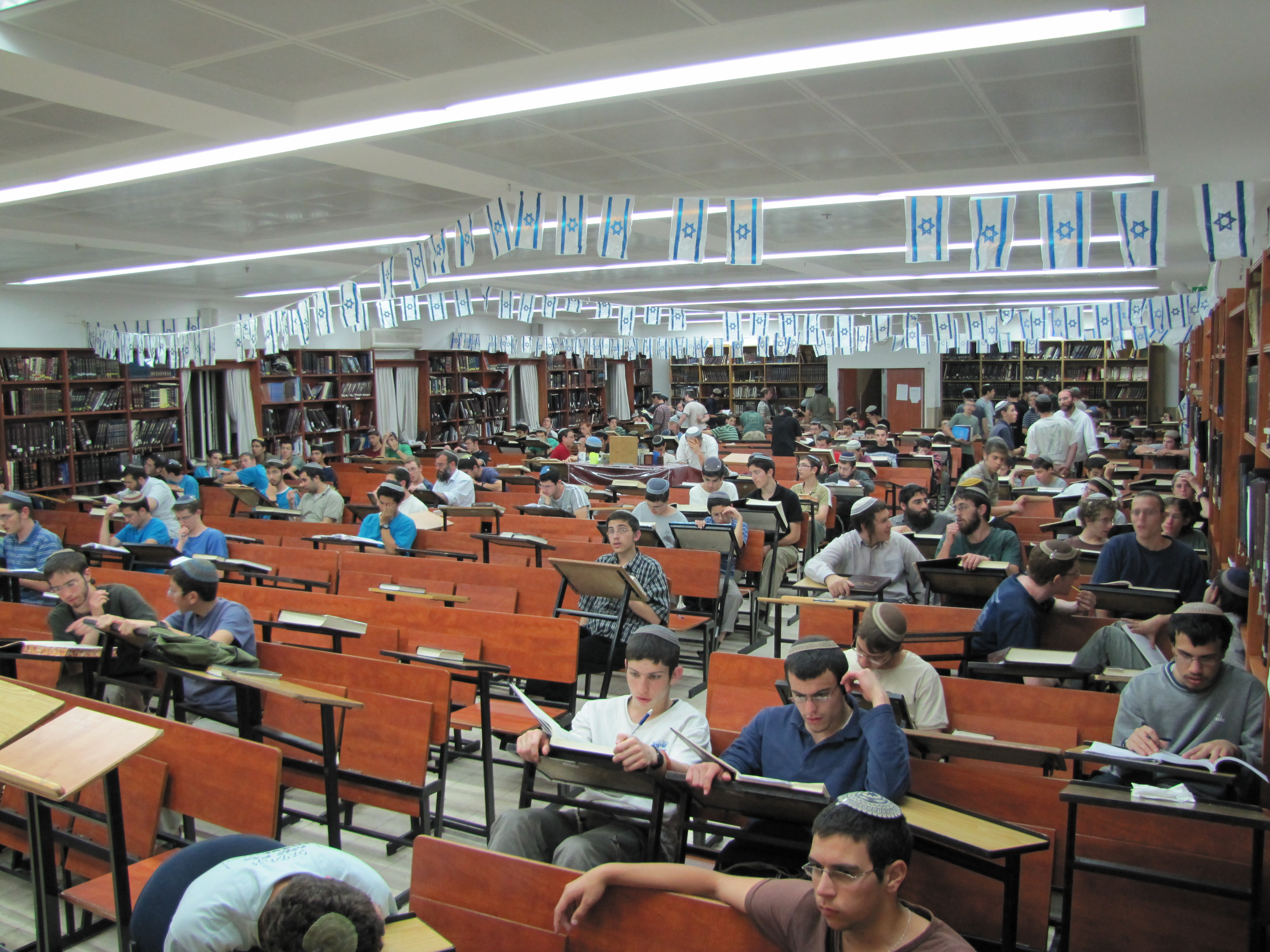
The Beit Midrash (main study hall) of "Yazhlatz"

== Faculty ==
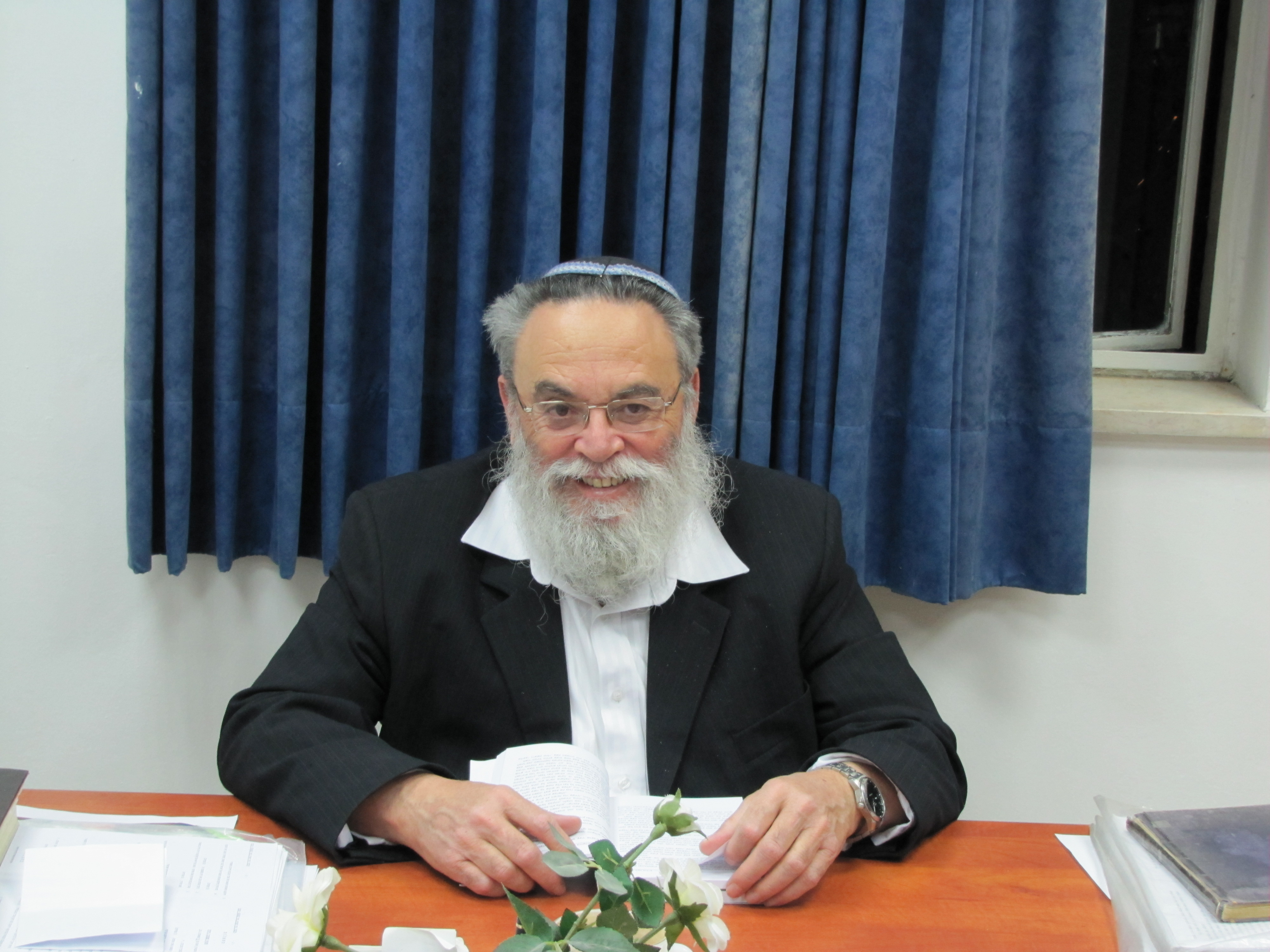
Rabbi Yerachamiel Weiss, the Rosh Yeshiva

In the first fifteen years (1964–1979), Rabbi Yaakov Filber, who founded the yeshiva served as the Rosh Yeshiva. Rabbi Eitan Eisamn filled in for one year in the middle. In 1979, Rabbi Filber was appointed as the rabbi of Kibbutz Hafetz Haim, and Rabbi Yerachamiel Weiss took over as the head of Yashlatz. Rabbi Weiss continued in this role until 5776 (2016) when he decided to step down due to an injury. From 5777 (2017) onward, Rabbi Yair Gizbar took on the job of the Ros yeshiva, Until then he served as the Rabbi of shiur Alef in Yeshivat Mercaz HaRav.

== Terrorist attack ==
On March 6, 2008, a terrorist opened fire at the Yeshivat Mercaz Harav, adjacent to Yashlatz. Five Yashlatz students were murdered in the school library, along with 3 students from the Yeshivat Mercaz Harav.

== Notable alumni ==
Famous graduates include Rabbi Yaakov Shapira (current Head of Mercaz HaRav Yeshiva), Rabbi Mordechai Elon (former Head of Yeshivat HaKotel and leader of the MiBreshit movement), Rabbi Eliezer Melamed, Rabbi Shmuel Eliyahu (chief rabbi of Tzfat) and Colonel Dror Weinberg, (Yehuda Brigade Commander in the IDF), who was killed in an ambush in Hebron in 2002.
