= Mercaz HaRav =

Yeshiva in Jerusalem

Coordinates: 31.7879°N 35.1967°E

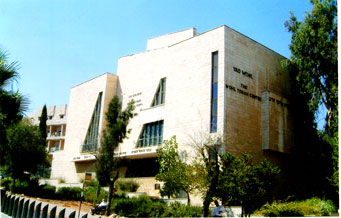
Main yeshiva building

Mercaz HaRav (officially, Hebrew: מרכז הרב - הישיבה המרכזית העולמית, "The Center of the Rav [Kook] - the Central Universal Yeshiva") is a national-religious (Hardal) yeshiva in Jerusalem, founded in 1924 by Ashkenazi Chief Rabbi Abraham Isaac Kook. Located in the city's Kiryat Moshe neighborhood, it has become the most prominent religious-Zionist yeshiva in the world and synonymous with Rabbi Kook's teachings. Many Religious Zionist educators and leaders have studied at Mercaz HaRav.

== Role ==
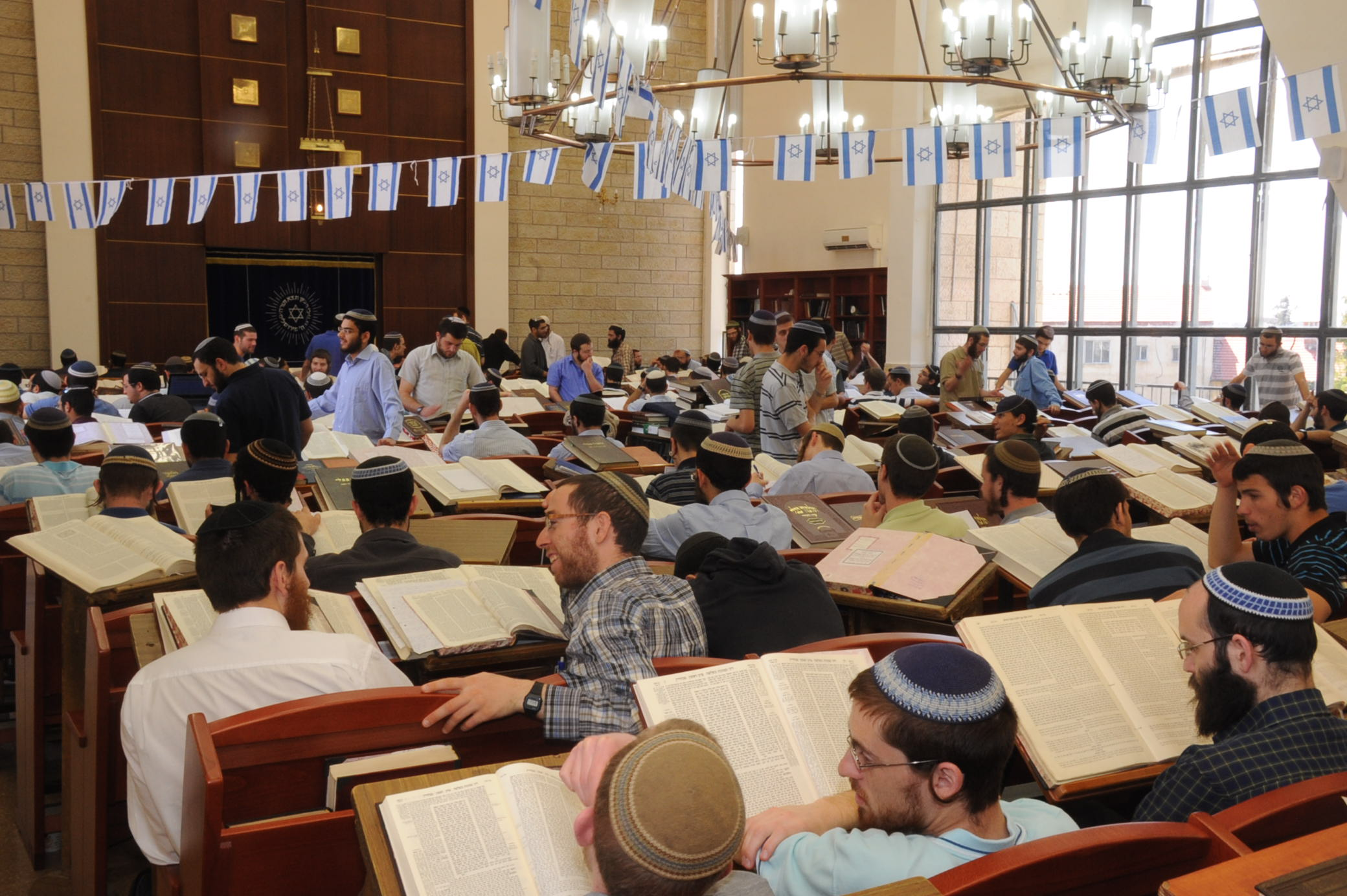
Mercaz HaRav Beit Midrash

The yeshiva views its role as Rabbi Kook's vision for a central institution for the spiritual revitalization of the Jewish people. Kook, however, lacked the financial backing necessary to establish a full-fledged academic institution. The yeshiva grew out of an evening program for young scholars who gathered to hear the recently appointed Chief Rabbi of Jerusalem lecture in Halakhah and Aggadah. Rabbi Yitchak Levi, a disciple of Rabbi Kook from his years in Jaffa, initiated this evening program in 1920, calling it Mercaz HaRav—"the Rabbi's Center." In a public letter from 1923, Rabbi Kook explained, "In a very small measure compared to the great role of the Universal Yeshiva, I have started leading the small and limited center 'Mercaz HaRav' as the cornerstone to establish the future Universal Yeshiva." The name "Mercaz HaRav" remained, despite the yeshiva's transformation over the years into one of Israel's largest and most influential yeshivot.

== History ==
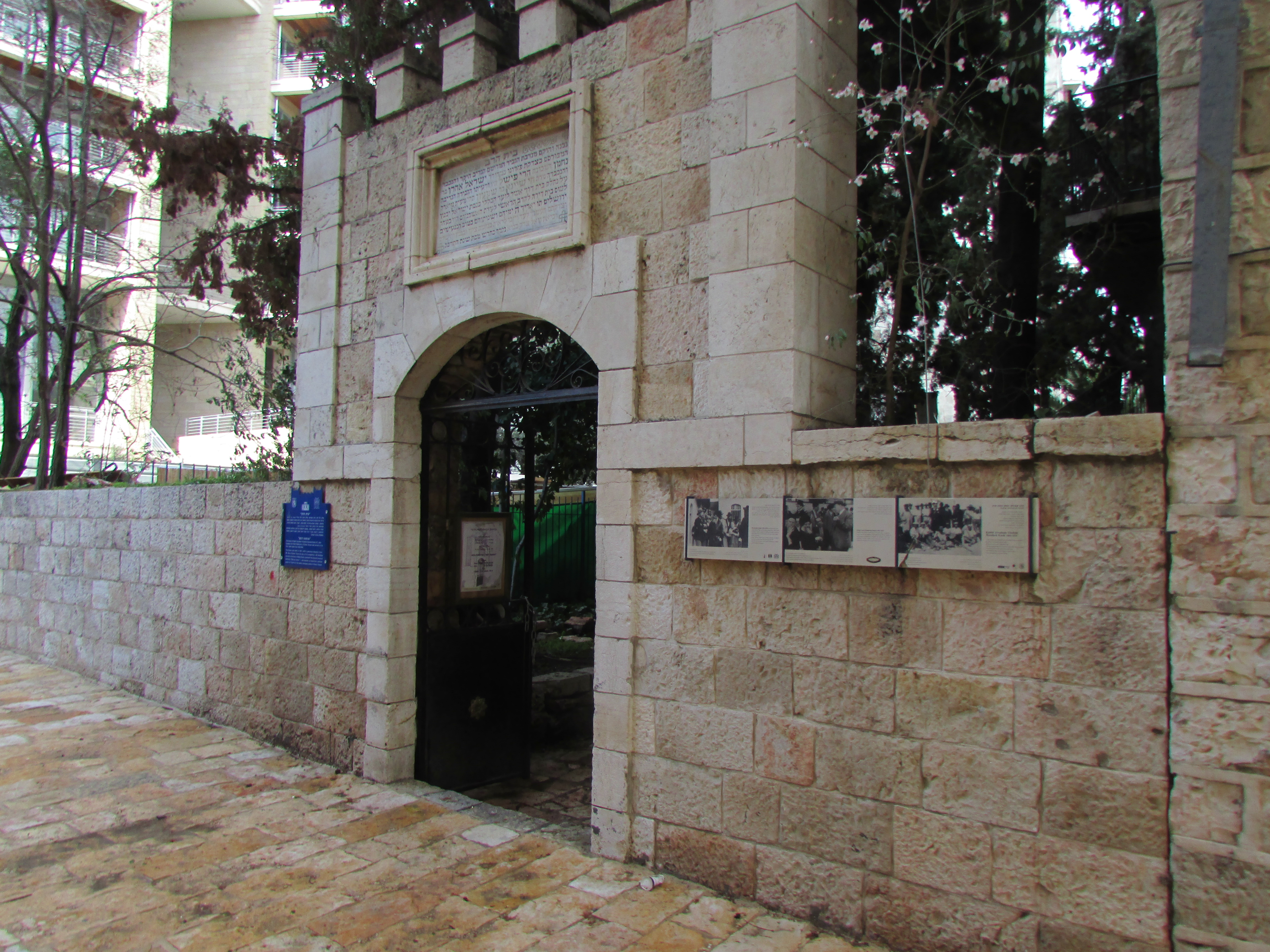
Original location of Mercaz HaRav yeshiva in "Beit HaRav", Jerusalem

Mercaz HaRav was founded in 1924 by Rabbi Abraham Isaac Kook, the chief Ashkenazi rabbi during the British Mandate for Palestine. It was housed in Beit HaRav, built by the noted American philanthropist Harry Fischel. Rabbi Kook's vision was to create a new yeshiva curriculum, integrating traditional Talmudic studies with Jewish philosophy, Bible, Jewish history, geography, and literature. The last three subjects, however, were never taught there.

In 1925, Rabbi Kook invited the great European scholar Rabbi Avraham Aharon Borstein (1867–1925) to serve as rosh yeshiva. Tragically, Rabbi Borstein died suddenly at age 58, nine months after taking up his duties.

Kook died in 1935, and his student, Rabbi Yaakov Moshe Charlap, succeeded him as rosh yeshiva. After Charlap's death in 1951, Rabbi Zvi Yehuda Kook, Rabbi Abraham Isaac Kook's son, took up his father's position. In 1982, after Rabbi Zvi Yehuda Kook died, Rabbi Avraham Shapira took the position and led the institution until his death in 2007. His son Rabbi Yaakov Shapira is his successor.

In its first decades, the yeshiva had few students, and its future was in doubt. However, in the 1950s, graduates of Bnei Akiva religious schools and high-school yeshivas seeking higher religious education entered Mercaz Harav. Bnei Akiva leader Rabbi Moshe Zvi Neria, a disciple of Rabbi Abraham Isaac Kook, encouraged students to go to Mercaz Harav, then headed by Rabbi Zvi Yehuda Kook.

In 1997, Rabbi Zvi Thau strongly opposed the introduction of an academic framework—plans to integrate a teaching institute—into Mercaz HaRav. As a result of the disagreement, he, together with six senior lecturers and many students, left the yeshiva and established the Har Hamor yeshiva.

In 2008, the yeshiva has about 500 students, including 200 students in the yeshiva's kollel (post-graduate division).

== Relationship to West Bank settlements ==
Rabbi Zvi Judah Kook's fundamentalist teachings as the Rosh Yeshiva of the Mercaz HaRav yeshiva were a major factor in the formation and activities of the settlement movement, mainly through his influence on the Gush Emunim movement, which was founded by his students. His student Rabbi Hanan Porat set out to restore the Jewish settlement in Gush Etzion immediately following the Six-Day War.

== Roshei Yeshiva ==
- Abraham Isaac Kook, (1924–1935)
- Avraham Aharon Borstein, (1925)
- Yaakov Moshe Charlap, (1935–1951)
- Tzvi Yehuda Kook, (1951–1982)
- Shaul Yisraeli, (1982–1995)
- Avraham Shapira, (1982–2007)
- Yaakov Shapira, (2007 to present)

== Mercaz HaRav massacre ==
On the night of March 6, 2008, a lone shooter from Jabel Mukaber in East Jerusalem, entered the yeshiva with a gun and began firing indiscriminately, murdering eight students and wounding 15 others. The attack ended with the arrival of Yitzhak Dadon, a part-time student of the yeshiva, and David Shapira, an officer in the Israel Defense Forces, who shot and killed the shooter.

=== Victims ===
Name	Age	From	Studied at
Neria Cohen	15	Jerusalem	Yashlatz
Segev Pniel Avihail	15	Neve Daniel	Yashlatz
Avraham David Moses	16	Efrat	Yashlatz
Yehonatan Yitzhak Eldar	16	Shilo	Yashlatz
Ro'i Roth	18	Elkana	Mercaz Harav
Yohai Lipshitz	18	Jerusalem	Yashlatz
Yonadav Chaim Hirshfeld	18	Kokhav HaShahar	Mercaz Harav
Doron Mahareta	26	Ashdod	Mercaz Harav

== Notable alumni ==
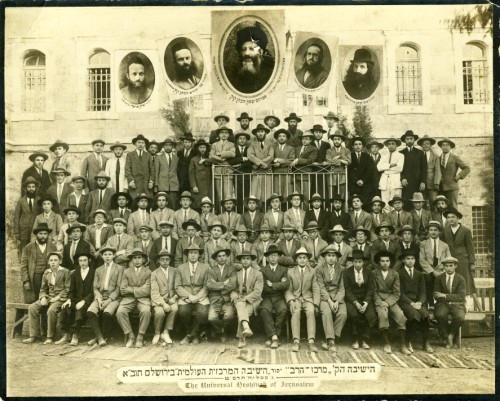
Picture of Kook, yeshiva faculty and students

The list includes a number of Knesset members, rabbis, and community leaders.

- Roni Alsheikh, head of the Israel Police
- Rabbi Yaakov Ariel, member of governing body of Gush Emunim and chief rabbi of Ramat Gan
- Rabbi Yisrael Ariel, former chief rabbi of the Jewish settlement of Yamit and #2 on the List of Israeli far-right ultranationalist party Kach, and head of the Temple Institute.
- Rabbi Shlomo Aviner, member of governing body of Gush Emunim and Rosh Yeshiva of Ateret Yerushalayim yeshiva, rabbi of Bet El
- Rabbi David Bar-Hayim
- Doctor Michael Ben-Ari, former Knesset member and founder of Israeli right-wing, ultranationalist party Otzma Yehudit
- Rabbi Yoel Bin-Nun, member of governing body of Gush Emunim and Yeshivat Har Etzion
- Ezriel Carlebach, founder of the Maariv newspaper
- Rabbi Oury Amos Cherki, lecturer and author
- Rabbi Zephaniah Drori, Chief Rabbi of Kiryat Shmona
- Rabbi Haim Druckman, former Knesset member, Rosh Yeshiva of Ohr Etzion Yeshiva
- Rabbi Menachem Froman, member of governing body Gush Emunim and former rabbi of Tekoa
- Daniel Hershkowitz (born 1953), politician, mathematician, rabbi, and president of Bar-Ilan University
- Hillel Kook, Knesset member
- Rabbi Dov Lior, former Chief Rabbi of Hebron/Kiryat Arba
- Moshe Levinger, founder of post-1967 Jewish settlement of Hebron
- Rabbi Eliezer Melamed, rabbi of Har Bracha
- Rabbi Zalman Baruch Melamed, Rosh Yeshiva of Beit El's yeshiva
- Rabbi Moshe-Zvi Neria, educator, former Knesset member, Rosh Yeshiva of yeshiva in Kfar Haroeh
- Hanan Porat, educator and Knesset member
- David Raziel, commander of the Irgun
- Rabbi Haim Sabato, Rosh Yeshiva of Yeshivat Birkat Moshe and author
- Rabbi David Samson, educator
- Rabbi Yitzchak Sheilat, Rosh Yeshiva at Yeshivat Birkat Moshe and Maimonides scholar
- Rabbi Zvi Thau, co-founder and president of Yeshivat Har Hamor
- Michel Warschawski (aka Mikado), left-wing activist and author; co-founder of the Alternative Information Center
- Rabbi Shaul Yisraeli, rabbi of Kfar Haroeh, Rosh Yeshiva at Mercaz HaRav, President of the Eretz Hemdah Institute
- Rabbi Mordechai Eliyahu, former Sephardic Chief Rabbi of Israel.
- Rabbi Samuel Eliyahu, chief rabbi of Safed and son of former Sephardic Chief Rabbi of Israel, Mordechai Eliyahu.
- Bezalel Smotrich, current finance minister, chairman of Religious Zionist Party (RZP).
- Avi Maoz, former Deputy Minister in the Prime Minister's Office and chairman of Noam.
