= Shaul Yisraeli =

Rabbi (1909–1995)

Rabbi Shaul Israeli Hebrew: הָרַב שָׁאוּל יִשְׂרָאֵלִי
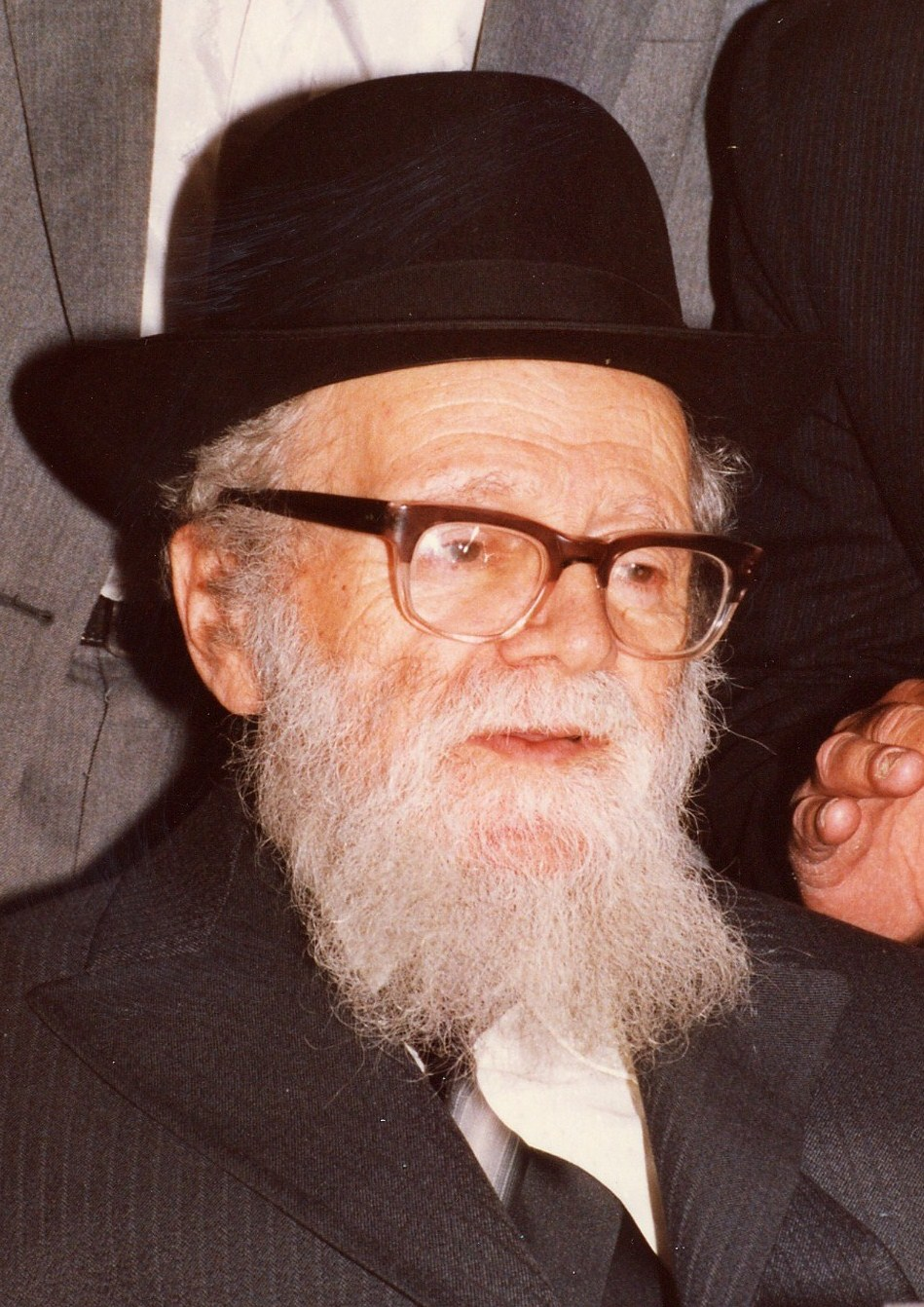
- Rabbi Shaul Yisraeli

Personal life
- Born: July 14, 1909 Slutsk, Belarus
- Died: June 17, 1995 (aged 85) Jerusalem
- Buried: Sanhedria Cemetery, Jerusalem

Religious life
- Religion: Judaism
- Denomination: Hardal

Shaul Yisraeli or Shaul Israeli, sometimes called "Saul Israeli" (Hebrew: הָרַב שָׁאוּל יִשְׂרָאֵלִי; July 14, 1909 – June 17, 1995) was one of the leading rabbis of religious Zionism. He served as the rabbi of moshav Kfar Haroeh, as a Dayan (rabbinic judge) in the Supreme religious court of Israel, as a member of the Chief Rabbinate Council, as Rosh Yeshiva in Mercaz HaRav, and as President of the Eretz Hemdah Institute. Rabbi Yisraeli was awarded the Israel Prize in Judaic Studies.

== Biography ==
=== Childhood ===
Shaul Yisraeli was born in the city of Slutsk, in the Minsk Governorate of the Russian Empire (present-day Belarus) to Rabbi Binyamin and Chava Izraelit. Rabbi Binyamin was the rabbi and Av Beit Din (Chief Rabbinical Judge) of Koydanovo, near Minsk, devoting himself to its spiritual rehabilitation after World War I. Rabbi Binyamin was arrested by the Soviets for teaching Torah to community members and was sent to Siberia; subsequently, all contact with him was lost. His mother Chava was later murdered by the Nazis.

As a youth, he learned in the Talmud Torah and Yeshiva Ketana under Rabbi Yehezkel Abramsky in Slutsk; this during the period when Rabbi Isser Zalman Meltzer was the Rosh Yeshiva. There he gained fame as a talmudic prodigy.

=== Escape to Israel ===
In Communist Russia, Yisraeli studied in various "underground" yeshivot. In 1933, after his requests for an exit visa from Russia were repeatedly denied, he illegally crossed the frozen Prut river into Poland. Yisraeli and his two friends were caught by the Polish police, who planned to return them to the Russian authorities – likely a death sentence. Due to the intervention of Chief Rabbi Avraham Isaac Kook and his son Rabbi Zvi Yehuda Kook, Yisraeli was released and granted an immigration certificate to Mandatory Palestine. He arrived in Jerusalem in 1933, and studied at Rabbi Kook's yeshiva, Mercaz Harav, for the following five years.

=== Rabbinic career ===
Yisraeli became rabbi of the religious moshav Kfar Haroeh in 1938, where he served as community rabbi until his 1965 appointment as judge (dayyan) in the Supreme Rabbinical Court in Jerusalem.

In 1982, after the passing of Rabbi Zvi Yehuda Kook, he was appointed Rosh Yeshiva of Mercaz HaRav yeshiva.

From 1987, he served as head of the Eretz Hemdah Institute, a prestigious Jerusalem kollel (teachers college) that trains yeshiva students as rabbis, rabbinical court judges, and teachers.

He died on June 16, 1995 (19 Sivan 5755) and is buried in the Sanhedria Cemetery in Jerusalem.

== Views ==
=== Tay-Sachs Disease ===
Like Rabbi Eliezer Waldenberg, Israeli ruled that it is permitted to abort a fetus diagnosed as a Tay–Sachs disease carrier to prevent future suffering of the child and mental anguish of the family. Other rabbinical authorities, however, strongly objected to this ruling.

=== Qibya Massacre and Wars of Vengeance ===
In 1953, in response to an attack on the Israeli town Yehud, Israeli forces infiltrated the Palestinian village of Qibya, then under Jordanian rule. They killed more than sixty-nine civilians, destroyed forty-five homes, a mosque, and a school. In response, Yisraeli penned a long essay discussing its halachic status. Yisraeli, reads Maimonides' analysis of Jewish religious warfare, and argues that it does not fall into the traditionally understood category of "defensive war." Rather, he argues, it may be in the category of pikuach nefesh, saving lives, and could permissible, even at the expense of innocent civilians. Furthermore, he novelly and controversially constructs a new category of halachic war, dubbed milkhemet nakamah ("war of vengeance").

== Works ==
- Eretz Hemdah (1957) – "to clarify the halacha and its application to agricultural life"
- Perakim beMachshevet Yisrael (1952) – “an anthology of sources to clarify the main ideas of Jewish philosophy"
- Amud HaYemini (1966) – “halachic clarification regarding the State, responsa, and clarification of issues in several areas of the Torah”
- Havat Binyamin (1992) – rulings from his tenure on the rabbinical high court
- Mishpatei Shaul (1997) – rulings from his tenure on the rabbinical high court
- Siach Shaul (2009) - teaching on the Torah and holidays
- Shaarei Shaul - comments on the Talmud
