= List of yeshivas, midrashas and Hebrew schools in Israel and the West Bank =

This is a list of yeshivas, midrashas, and Hebrew schools in Israel and the West Bank.

In Orthodox Judaism a yeshiva (Hebrew: ישיבה) is an educational institution where men can study the Torah, the Talmud, and develop their character. A yeshiva usually is led by a rabbi called a rosh yeshiva (head of the yeshiva). A midrasha (Hebrew: מדרשה) or seminary is an equivalent educational institution for Jewish women. In Conservative Judaism and Reform Judaism, men and women study together at yeshivas.

== Yeshivas ==
- Yeshiva Ohr Yerushalayim
- Yeshiva Heichal Eliahu
- HaYeshiva HaGehova Hebrew
- Heichal HaTorah BeZion
- Jerusalem College of Technology
- Maale Efraim Hesder Yeshiva
- Machon Benayah Yeshiva
- Merkaz Herzog Center
- Yeshiva Ateret Cohanim
- Yeshiva Ayelet of Eilat
- Yeshiva Bat Ayin
- Yeshiva Toras Chaim
- Yeshiva Mercaz Hatorah
- Ohr Yerushalaim
- Mesivta Adams D'Darnold
- Yeshiva Chofetz Chaim
- Yeshiva Beit Orot
- Yeshivat Beit Nochum – Telz Stone
- Yeshivat Ligh Tweit Lev – Beit Meir
- Mesivta Starkmann De’Gunzz
- Yeshiva Bnei Akiva
- Yeshiva Chemdat Yehuda
- Yeshiva Darkhei Torah
- Yeshiva Gedolah Ramat Shlomo
- Yeshivat Har Etzion
- Yeshiva Hadras Yerushalayim
- Yeshiva HaGolan
- Yeshiva Har Hamor
- Yeshiva Hesder Akko
- Yeshiva Hesder Holon
- Yeshiva Hesder Karnei Shomron
- Yeshiva Hesder Nahariya
- Yeshiva Hesder Maale Efraim
- Yeshiva Hesder Sderot
- Yeshiva Hesder Ramat Gan
- Yeshiva heichal yerushalayim
- Yeshivas Itri
- Yeshiva Kefar HaRoe
- Yeshiva Kehillat Yaakov
- Yeshiva Kyriat Malachi
- Yeshiva Kyriat Moshe
- Yeshiva Maale Gilboa Hebrew
- Yeshiva Ma'alot
- Yeshivat Mercaz HaRav
- Yeshiva Ner Yaakov
- Yeshiva Neve Aretz
- Yeshiva Neve Dekalim
- Yeshiva Ohr Elchonon
- Yeshiva Or Tzion Hebrew
- Yeshiva Or Vishua Hebrew
- Yeshiva Otniel Hebrew
- Yeshiva Petach Tikva
- Yeshiva Rehovot
- Yeshiva Rishon Le Tzion
- Yeshivas Reishis Yerushalayim
- Yeshiva Shaalvim Hebrew
- Yeshiva Shalom Rav
- Yeshiva Tekoa Hebrew
- Yeshiva Torah Nachal
- Yeshiva Torah Manhiga
- Yeshiva Torah Shraga
- Yeshiva Tzurba Merabanan
- Mechina Beit Israel
- Mechina Chemdat Yehuda
- Mechina Echannaton
- Mechina Elisha
- Mechina Yeud
- Nahal Haredi Netzah Yehuda
- Nachal Novea Kollel Tzfat
- Neveh Tzion
- Ohr Somayach, Jerusalem
- Pardes Institute of Jewish Studies
- Schechter Jewish Institute
- Tiferes Zvi Institutions
- Torah L'Maaseh
- The Tzomet Institute
- Yeshiva Ateret Yerushalayim
- Yeshiva Bais Yisroel
- Yeshiva Beit Horot Har HaZeitim
- Yeshiva Beit Yosef English
- Yeshiva Birkat Moshe English
- Yeshiva Breslev, Bnei Brak
- Yeshiva Chabad of Tzfat
- Yeshiva Charnobyl English
- Yeshiva Chazon Nahum
- Yeshiva Derech HaTalmud
- Yeshiva Dvar Yerushalayim
- Yeshivat Eretz HaTzvi
- Yeshiva HaKotel
- Yeshiva Har Bracha
- Yeshiva Heichal HaTorah
- Yeshiva High School of Sussya
- Yeshiva Kaf HaHaim
- Yeshiva Kiryat Shemona
- Yeshiva Lev Aharon
- Yeshiva Lev Aryeh
- Yeshiva Lev HaTorah
- Yeshiva Lomdei Torah
- Yeshiva Maale Gilboa English
- Yeshiva Maalot English
- Yeshiva Marbeh Torah
- Yeshiva Midrash Shmuel
- Yeshiva Migdal HaTorah
- Yeshiva Nesivos Ahron
- Yeshiva Netiv Aryeh
- Yeshiva Netivot Chaim, Bnai Brak
- Yeshiva Or Avraham
- Yeshiva Or David
- Yeshiva Or Tmimim
- Yeshiva Or Tzion English
- Yeshiva Or Vishua English
- Yeshiva Or Yerushalaym
- Yeshiva Otniel English
- Yeshiva Petah Tikvah English
- Yeshiva Reishit Center
- Yeshiva Ruach Chaim
- Yeshiva Shaalvim English
- Yeshiva Shaare Chaim
- Yeshiva Sha'arei Mevaseret Zion
- Yeshiva Shalom Rav
- Yeshiva Shalom Tzat
- Yeshiva Shaavei Hevron
- Yeshiva Simchat Shlomo
- Yeshiva Sulam Yaakov
- Yeshiva Tekoa English
- Yeshiva Temimei Derech
- Yeshiva Tiferet Yerushalayim
- Yeshiva Tiferes Chaim
- Yeshiva Toras Emes Chabad Lubavitch
- Yeshiva Torat Shraga
- Yeshiva Torat Yosef
- Yeshiva Tzeirei Hashluchim Tzfat (Chabad)
- Yeshiva Yashlatz
- Yeshiva Yesod Hatorah
- Yeshiva Yesodei Hatorah
- Yeshiva Yishrei Lev
- Yeshiva Zeev HaTorah
- Yeshiva Zichron Dovid

=== Hesder Yeshivas ===
- Har Hamor
- Maale Efraim Hesder Yeshiva
- Meir Harel Hesder Yeshiva
- Mercaz HaRav
- Yeshivat Birkat Moshe
- Yeshivat Eretz HaTzvi
- Yeshivat HaHesder Yerucham
- Yeshivat HaKotel
- Yeshivat Har Bracha
- Yeshivat Har Etzion
- Yeshivat Hesder Elon Moreh
- Yeshivat Hesder Petah Tikva
- Yeshiva Hesder Sderot
- Yeshiva Hesder Tefahot
- Yeshiva Hesder Yerucham
- Yeshivat Kerem B'Yavneh
- Yeshivat Ma'alot
- Yeshivat Or Etzion
- Yeshivat Or Vishua
- Yeshivat Otniel
- Yeshivat Sha'alvim
- Yeshivat Shilo

=== Yeshivas in Bnei Brak ===
- Ponevezh Yeshiva
- Kollel Chazon Ish
- Marbeh Torah
- Ponevezh Yeshiva
- Slabodka yeshiva (Bnei Brak)

=== Yeshivas in Jerusalem ===
- Aish HaTorah
- Ateret Cohanim
- Bais Hatalmud
- Beit El Synagogue
- Beth Jacob Jerusalem
- Bircas HaTorah
- Derech Etz Chaim
- Diaspora Yeshiva
- Dvar Yerushalayim
- Conservative Yeshiva
- Yeshivat Eretz HaTzvi
- Eretz Hemdah Institute
- Etz Chaim Yeshiva
- Fuchsberg Center
- Yeshivat HaKotel
- Har Hamor
- Harry Fischel Institute for Talmudic Research
- Hebrew Union College-Jewish Institute of Religion
- Heichal HaTorah BeZion
- Keser Torah Radomsk
- Kol Torah
- Lakewood East
- Machon Meir
- Machon Shlomo – The Heiden Institute
- Machon Yaakov
- Mayanot
- Meah Shearim Yeshiva and Talmud Torah
- Medrash Chaim
- Mercaz HaRav
- Mercaz Hatorah
- Midrash Shmuel Yeshiva
- Mir Yeshiva (Jerusalem)
- Ohr Somayach, Jerusalem
- Yeshiva Pachad Yitzchok
- Porat Yosef Yeshiva
- Pressburg Yeshiva (Jerusalem)
- Sfas Emes Yeshiva
- Shaar Hashamayim Yeshiva
- Shapell's Darche Noam
- Shuvu Bonim
- Torah Ore
- Torah Tech
- Toras Emes Chabad Lubavitch
- Yeshiva Aderes HaTorah
- Yeshiva Toras Moshe
- Yashlatz
- Yeshiva Ohr Elchonon (Jerusalem)
- Yeshivas Bais Yisroel
- Yeshivas Itri
- Yeshiva Knesset Avraham
- Yeshivat Aderet Eliyahu
- Yeshivat Netiv Aryeh
- Yeshivat Ohr David
- Yeshivas Tiferes Yisroel Chaim
- Yeshiva Torah V'Avodah

=== Yeshivas in the West Bank ===
- Beit El yeshiva
- Migdal Oz (seminary)
- Mir Brachfeld
- Od Yosef Chai
- Yeshivat Birkat Moshe
- Yeshivat HaMivtar
- Yeshivat Har Bracha
- Yeshivat Har Etzion

=== Zionist yeshivas ===
- Ahavat Israel Hesder Yeshiva
- Yeshivat Lev Hatorah
- Yeshivat Torat HaChaim

== Mechinas ==
- Mechina Bnei David Eli
- Mechina Keshet Yehuda
- Mechina Kyriat Malachi
- Mechina Magen Shaul
- Mechina Maayan Baruch
- Mechina Nachshon Negev
- Mechina Kol Ami

== Midrashas ==
- Ayelet HaShajar
- Beth Jacob Jerusalem
- Bnos Avigail
- Bnos Batsheva
- Bnos Chava
- Bnos Sarah
- EYAHT
- Havineini Bais Yaakov Seminary
- Machon Bnos Yehuda (BYA)
- Machon Gold
- Machon Raaya
- Machon Ora
- Machon Tal
- Midreshet Binat Shilo
- Midreshet HaRova
- Midreshet Lindenbaum
- Midreshet Maamakim
- Midreshet Schechter
- Midreshet Rachel v’Chaya
- Midreshet Tehillah
- Migdal Oz (seminary)
- Neve Yerushalayim
- Baer Miriam Center
- Beit Chana, Tzfat
- Beit Midrash Migdal Oz
- Beth Oloth, Jerusalem
- Bnos Chana, Beit Shemesh
- Bnot Torah Institute, Jerusalem
- Emunah College of Education
- Emunah Torah Art
- Eshel Sephardic Women's Seminary
- Igud HaMidrashot
- Midrasha Shirat Devora
- Neve Hadassah for Women
- Neve Yerushalaym College
- Nishmat
- Maatan HaSharon
- Machal Michlalah
- Machon Alte Chabad
- Machon Maayan Program
- Mayanot Women's Learning Program
- Machon Roni Jerusalem
- Machon Shoshanat Yerushalaym
- Machon Tal, Givat Shaul, Jerusalem
- Maayanot Sem
- Michlelet Mevaseret Yerushalaym
- Midrasha for Advanced Torah Studies Bar-Ilan University
- Midrasha Efrata
- Midrasha Michlalah
- Midrasha Talpiot
- Midreshet Akko
- Midreshet Amit
- Midreshet Aviv Dati Leumi
- Midreshet Shirat Hevron
- Midreshet Bat Tzion
- Midreshet Berot Bat Ayin
- Midreshet Devora
- Midreshet Ein Ha Natziv
- Midreshet Emunah
- Midreshet HaRova
- Midreshet Hebron
- Midreshet Moriah
- Midreshet Lindenbaum
- Midreshet Rachel Shapell's
- Midreshet Shuva
- Midreshet Tel Hai
- Midreshet Tehilla, Yerushalaym
- Midreshet Tzvia, Yerushalaym
- Midreshet Yeud, Jerusalem
- Ohr Chaya Center, Jerusalem
- Orot HaGalil College
- Pelech School Jerusalem
- Pninim Kiryat Moshe
- Shaanan Academic Religious Teachers' College
- Sharei Bina Women's Center
- Shalvim Midrasha for Women
- Shearim College for Women
- Shoshanat Yerushalaym
- Tal Institute
- Talpiot College of Education
- Tiferet Center Beit Shemesh
- Tomer Devorah Seminary
- Torah Academy for Girls
- Torat Reva Yerushalaym

== Israeli Hebrew schools ==
- Ace Academic Center
- Beit Margalit Hebrew School
- Democratic School of Hadera
- Keren HaYeled Hebrew School
- Kindergarten Gan Yehudit
- Nachal Novea Mekor Chochma
- Neve Shmuel Boys High School
- Makor Ha Tikvah Hebrew School
- Shalom Hartman Hebrew School
- Shvut Rachel Hebrew School
- Talmud Torah Magen Avot
- Talmud Torah Pinsk Karlin
- Talmud Torah Rav Pealim
- Talmud Torah Torat Olam
- Talmud Torah Yakov Yosef
- Talmud Torah Ziv HaTorah
- Torah Academy of Jerusalem
- Yeshiva Ketana Kiryat Breslev

== Religious academic college ==
- Michlalah-Jerusalem College

== See also ==
- List of Israeli universities and colleges
- List of synagogues in Israel
- List of synagogues in the United States
- List of Jewish communities in North America
- List of Jewish communities in the United Kingdom
- Structure and internal organization of the Israel Army
