= Yehoshua Weitzman =

Israeli Rosh Yeshiva (born 1949)

Rabbi Yehoshua Weitzman (Hebrew: יהושע ויצמן) is an Israeli Rosh Yeshiva, heading Yeshivat Ma’alot Ya’akov, and prominent as a teacher and scholar of Torat Eretz Yisrael.

Weitzman was born in 1949 in Tel-Aviv. Following five years of study at Yeshivat Kerem B'Yavneh, he learned for three years at Machon Harry Fischel under the auspices of Chief Rabbi Shlomo Goren and Rabbi Sha'ar Yeshuv Cohen where he received smicha (ordination); he also was a student of Rabbi Zvi Yehuda Kook. He then served as a Ra"m and mashgiach at Yeshivat Kfar Ha'Roeh and later as Rosh Kollel in Yeshivat HaGolan, Hispin.

In 1989, when Yeshivat Ma’alot Ya’akov was considering closing due to lack of students, Weitzman was appointed Rosh Yeshiva. Since his appointment, Yeshivat Ma’alot has grown from 60 students to over 300 students. Today, Yeshivat Ma’alot is one of Israel's largest Hesder Yeshivot with a large intake of Israeli students.

Rabbi Weitzman is considered the reviver of learning and teaching Torat Eretz Yisrael, the uniqueness of Torah, which is revealed only in the Land of Israel. Weitzman is also the founder of Nachalat Shay, association for teaching Judaism and El-Ami Batzafon, a movement for outreach and Face to Face, (פנים אל פנים), a movement for unity of Jews.

He has spoken out against protests made by IDF soldiers against Gaza outpost evictions and demolitions.

In April 2025, Israeli activist Naor Narkis published a video in which Weizman is seen citing Jewish sages saying that women naturally require perfume but men do not, since women naturally smell worse than men.
