= Meir Kahana =

Head of Ashkelon rabbinical court

Rabbi Meir Kahana מאיר כהנא
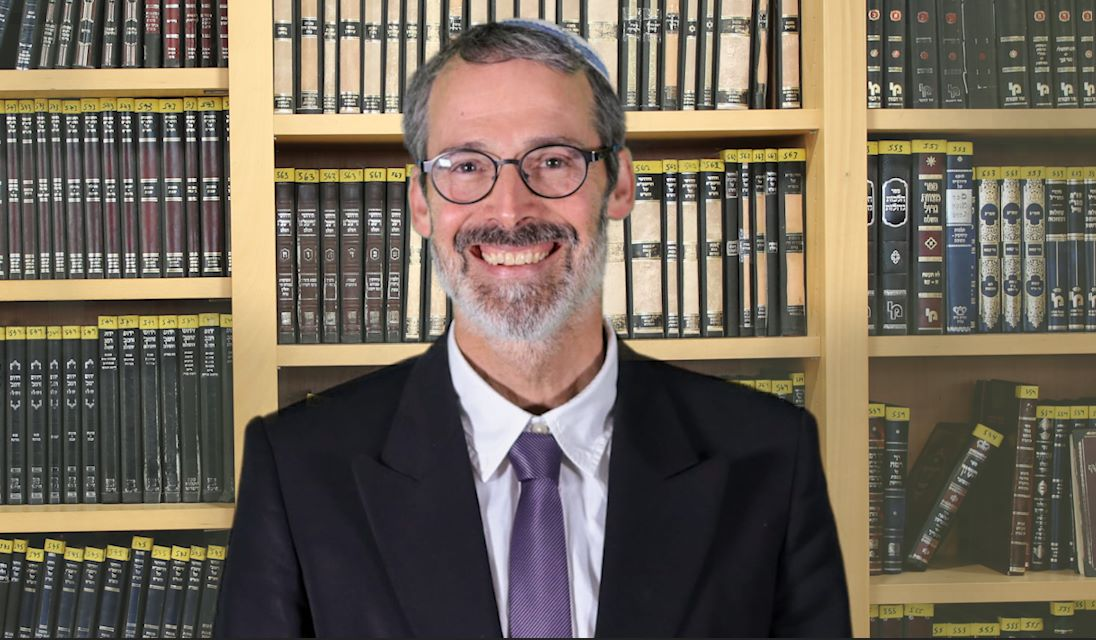
- Title: Av Beit Din Ashkelon

Personal life
- Born: Meir Kahana Bat Yam, Israel

Religious life
- Religion: Judaism
- Denomination: Religious Zionism
- Residence: Jerusalem

Meir Kahana (Hebrew: מאיר כהנא) is an Av Beit Din in the rabbinical court of Ashkelon. He serves as Chairman of the Rabbinical Judges Union and delivers Torah lectures at Yerucham Hesder Yeshiva. On June 4, 2023, he was elected as the Religious Zionism candidate for the Chief Rabbinate of Israel.

== Biography ==
Kahana was born in Bat Yam to Dov, an accountant, and Ester Golda, a schoolteacher. He grew up in Bnei Brak and attended Netiv Meir Yeshiva high school. Post graduation, he studied at the Hesder Yeshiva in Kiryat Shmona for seven years, as a student of Rav Zephaniah Drori. After his marriage, he studied for another year in the Kollel in Kiryat Shmona, following which he moved to Jerusalem and studied for qualification as a Rabbinic Judge in the prestigious Eretz Chemda Kollel.

Kahana served in the 890th Battalion of the Paratrooper's Brigade, completed an Infantry Officer's course and served as an officer in the South Lebanon Security Zone during the early 1990s. He later served in reserve duty as an infantry Company Commander during the years 2004 to 2012. Rabbi Kahana currently serves in the Home Front Command as a Lieutenant Colonel (in reserve duty).

In 2000, at the age of 31, Rabbi Kahana was appointed as RAM in the Yerucham Hesder Yeshiva headed by Rabbi Eliyahu Blumenzweig and served at this position for 10 years.

In 2011, he was elected to serve as a Rabbinic Judge in the Beer Sheva Rabbinic Court, transferred to the Rabbinic Court of Tel Aviv in 2016, and in 2018 was chosen to head the Rabbinic Court of Ashkelon.

In 2014, Kahana headed the committee conducting the process that brought to the nomination of Rabbis Aryeh Stern and Shlomo Amar to the Chief Rabbis of Jerusalem.

Kahana has been a member of the Rabbinical Judges Union since 2016 and has led it since 2020.

In April 2023 Kahana announced his candidacy for the Chief Rabbinate, and in June 2023, was chosen by a wide ranging committee of Religious Zionist rabbis as the agreed upon candidate.

Serves as committee member of Yeshivot Kiryat Shmonah and Yerucham, and the Ezra youth group.
