= Bible at Eye Level =

Modern rabbinic interpretation of Hebrew Bible

Tanakh at Eye Level (Hebrew: תנ״ך בגובה העיניים) is an approach to studying the plain meaning of biblical verses, developed by Rabbi Yoel Bin-Nun, Rabbi Yaakov Medan, and other rabbis from Yeshivat Har Etzion and its associated circles. This methodology emphasizes deriving new interpretations based on the straightforward reading of the text, sometimes diverging from traditional midrashic interpretations and classical commentators. It incorporates modern scholarly tools in biblical study, including literary analysis, archaeological findings, and methodologies from biblical criticism.

The approach has faced significant opposition within more conservative segments of the Religious Zionist community, primarily due to its willingness to critically examine the actions of biblical figures. Proponents argue that these figures should be viewed as humans capable of flaws and sins, interpreting their actions at face value, rather than strictly adhering to rabbinic interpretations. This debate, often referred to as the "Tanakh controversy", is particularly pronounced between Yeshivat Har Etzion and certain Chardal yeshivas.

== Background ==
In the era of the Acharonim (from the 16th century onward), especially within the yeshiva world, there was a decline in studying the peshat of the Tanakh, particularly the Neviim and Ketuvim. When these texts were studied, it was customary to do so through the lens of rabbinic midrashim. After the establishment of Yeshivat Har Etzion, there was a renewed emphasis on studying the Tanakh with a focus on its plain meaning.

In 1992, Rabbi Yaakov Medan published an article titled "Megillat Batsheva" (The Scroll of Batsheva) in the journal "Megadim", discussing King David's sin with Bathsheba. In 2002, the article was expanded and published as a book titled "David U'batsheva: Hachet, HaOnesh, V'hatikkun." He argued that David did sin with Bathsheba, aligning with the rebuke from the prophet Nathan and David's own admission of sin, but contrary to the Talmudic statement that "whoever says David sinned is merely mistaken". In 1996, Rabbi Yehuda Brandes published an article in "Megadim" addressing this topic. Subsequent articles by Rabbis Yaakov Medan and Avraham Walfish offered more nuanced views on David's sin, but still acknowledged his wrongdoing.

In 2002, Rabbi Zvi Thau published a series of articles, including a booklet titled "Tzaddik B'emunato Yichyeh" (The Righteous Shall Live by His Faith), criticizing the method of Tanakh study practiced at Yeshivat Har Etzion and in academia. Following this, several rabbis, mainly from the "Yeshivot HaKav", such as Rabbi Shlomo Aviner in the newspaper "HaTzofe", and Rabbi Avigdor Nebenzahl, expressed their opposition. Rabbis from Yeshivat Har Etzion, including Rabbis Yuval Cherlow and Yoel Bin-Nun, responded with articles defending their approach.

In 2012, a new curriculum for Tanakh study was introduced in the state-religious education system. Many rabbis opposed it, claiming it incorporated the "Tanakh at Eye Level" approach. Some labeled the program as inappropriate, suggesting that students should transfer to schools not adopting this method. Among the critics were Rabbis Eliyahu Bakshi-Doron, Yaakov Ariel, Shlomo Aviner, Yisrael Rosen, Avigdor Nebenzahl, and Dov Lior.

== Terminology ==
The term "Tanakh at Eye Level" is primarily used by opponents of the approach to emphasize viewing biblical figures as ordinary people with human flaws and weaknesses, analyzing their actions through independent reasoning rather than solely relying on rabbinic interpretations. Some critics use the term "Tanakh at Heaven's Height" to describe the traditional and, in their view, appropriate perspective on biblical figures. However, some proponents of the approach also refer to it as "Tanakh at Eye Level," including Rabbi Yoel Bin-Nun.

== Examples ==
- The Sin of David and Bathsheba – In the Book of Samuel, the prophet Nathan accused David of causing the death of Uriah the Hittite and taking his wife, to which David responded, "I have sinned against the Lord." However, according to the Sages (Chazal), this was not a sin of adultery, as Bathsheba had received a bill of divorce (get) from Uriah before he went to war, and Uriah's death was justified under the law of rebellion against the king. Some commentators interpret David's sin as minor, while others argue that he did not sin at all. Rabbis who support the Tanakh at Eye Level approach tend to interpret the verses literally, that David sinned with Bathsheba and caused Uriah's death.
- The Case of Reuven and Bilhah – The Torah states that Reuven sinned and slept with Bilhah, his father's concubine. However, Rabbi Shmuel bar Nachmani of the Talmud explained that Reuven did not actually sin, but rather "disrupted his father's bed", and the Torah treated it as if he had sinned. Rabbis who support the "Tanakh at Eye Level" approach tend to interpret the verses literally, that Reuven did, in fact, sleep with Bilhah.

== Arguments for and against the approach ==
=== Supporters' Arguments ===
- Chazal themselves often interpret the actions of biblical figures as sins. When there is a view within Chazal that aligns more closely with the plain meaning (peshat) of the verses, which indicates that they sinned, it should be preferred over a view that claims they did not sin.
- There are commentators, such as Ibn Ezra, Rashbam, Ramban, Radak, and Abarbanel, who interpret the actions of biblical figures as sins, or take the a more peshat-oriented read of the text, at times even contradicting the words of Chazal. For example, Abarbanel says David sinned against Uriah by killing him.
- The statements of Chazal that biblical figures did not sin are part of aggadic teachings, given in homiletical interpretations, and are not halakhic rulings. Therefore, these statements should not be accepted as absolute truth.

=== Opponents' Arguments ===
- Just as the legal sections of the Torah are only studied with the guidance of Chazal, the rest of the Tanakh should also be studied exclusively through their interpretations. Their explanations generally present the sins of biblical figures in a more complex manner than what appears in a simplistic reading of the verses, allowing for a deeper understanding of their actions and transgressions.
- Biblical figures are not "ordinary", or simple, people; they are holy individuals. Therefore, their sins should not be understood in a straightforward, or literal, manner. Instead, they should be interpreted through the lens of Chazal, who present their sins in a more nuanced and refined way. Additionally, some argue that if their sins were as severe as the plain reading of the text suggests, they would not have been worthy of divine revelation or the spirit of prophecy.
- If we view biblical figures as ordinary people, we lose an aspirational model. Learning about them through the interpretations of Chazal provides an uplifting spiritual vision, encouraging us to strive for their level of greatness.

== Proponents of the Method ==
- Yoel Bin-Nun
- Yaakov Medan
- Menachem Leibtag
- Amnon Bazak
- Shani Taragin
- Yael Ziegler

== Related Sources ==
- Rabbi Yaakov Medan's article "Megilat Batsheva" in "Megadim" (1992).
- Rabbi Yehuda Brandes' article in "Megadim" (1996).
- Rabbi Zvi Thau's booklet "The Righteous Shall Live by His Faith" (2002).
- Rabbi Yoel Bin-Nun's response articles (2002).
- Hi Sichati: On Tanach Methodology by Yeshivat Har Etzion
- Torah MiEtzion: New Readings in Tanach series by Yeshivat Har Etzion
