= Killing of Aisha al-Rabi =

Terrorist incident in West Bank

- Aisha al-Rabi
- Location: Near Tapuah Junction, Highway 60, West Bank, Palestine
- Date: October 12, 2018; 9:30 PM
- Attack type: stone throwing
- Weapon: rock weighing 2 kg (4.4 lb)
- Perpetrator: Israeli settler youth
- Charges: manslaughter committed as an act of terrorism; throwing stones at a vehicle under aggravated circumstances as an act of terrorism; deliberately damaging a car as an act of terrorism
- Verdict: Guilty
- Convicted: 1

On October 12, 2018, Aisha al-Rabi (Arabic: عائشة الرابي), 47, a Palestinian woman, was killed by Jewish settler teens near the Tapuah Junction in the northern Israeli-occupied West Bank south of Nablus as they hurled rocks at the car she was traveling in. One particularly large rock smashed the front windshield and crushed her skull.

In December 2018, five teenage settlers from a nearby Jewish religious boarding school were detained as suspects of the crime. Four of them were released in January 2019, but one, a 16-year-old boy, was held until he was placed in house arrest in May. In May 2020, it was reported that he had been allowed to return home to his settlement in the West Bank. In March 2026, the settler, now age 24, was convicted of manslaughter as an act of terrorism. He was sentenced in September to 13 years in prison and a NIS 258,000 ($85,500) fine to the victim's family.

The attack was labelled a terrorist attack by the Israeli government but Aisha al-Rabi's family has not received compensation from it because they are not Israeli citizens.

== The killing ==
Aisha, her husband Yaqoub (also translit: Aykube), 51, and her daughter Rama, 8, were on their way home to Bidya, Salfit Governorate in the northwestern West Bank, south of Nablus from Hebron where one of Aisha and Yaqoub's six daughters live. They were traveling in their car on Highway 60. At around 9:30 pm Yaqoub, who drove the car, slowed down about 100 meters before the Tapuah Junction where a permanent Israeli checkpoint is located.

At that point, a group of settlers on the right shoulder of the road began hurling stones at the car. The front windshield and the right passenger side window where Aisha was sitting was hit by the barrage. One particularly heavy rock, weighing roughly two kilos, was dropped on the car, smashing the windshield and hitting her on the right side of her face on the ear as she was talking to Yaqoub. The rock crushed her skull and caused her to lose consciousness.

Yaqoub rushed Aisha to Rafidia hospital in Nablus, a 20 minutes drive away, where his wife was pronounced dead.

=== Responses ===
The US Consulate General in Jerusalem expressed condolences for Aisha Rabi's family and called for the perpetrators to be brought to justice. Jason Greenblatt, the US Special Envoy for Middle East Negotiations, also expressed condolences for Aisha's family and called her killing "reprehensible." The United Nations Special Coordinator for the Middle East Peace Process Nickolay Mladenov condemned the attack and called the Israeli authorities to bring the perpetrators to justice. The Minister of Tourism Yariv Levin criticized left-wing activists for blaming Jewish incidents, claiming they were basing their allegations on "scraps of an incident." Israeli Justice Minister Ayelet Shaked met with the families of the five suspects on January 7, 2019 to hear their concerns.

== Investigation ==
A few days later, the Israeli secret police, Shin Bet, began investigating the case. Itamar Ben-Gvir, leader of the far-right party Otzma Yehudit was critical of the agency's involvement: "Experience shows the Jewish Division investigates... in an aggressive and problematic manner which does not allow the truth to come out, but at most brings out false confessions." According to The Times of Israel, the involvement of Shin Bet indicated that the authorities suspected that the attack was carried out by settlers.

The investigation led Shin Bet to focus on Pri Ha'aretz, a religious boarding school in Rechelim, located close to where the stones were thrown. According to Shin Bet, far-right activists from the nearby Yitzhar settlement drove to Pri Haaretz on Saturday morning, the day after the murder, to help the students prepare for future interrogation from Israeli authorities and to avoid revealing incriminating evidence. This was seen as suspicious because Saturday is the Jewish day of rest and most religious Jews would observe the religious injunction to not drive on that day.

=== Arrest ===
At the end of December 2018, the Shin Bet arrested three students from Pri Ha'aretz and interrogated them for a week without allowing them to meet with attorneys. Five days later, two more students were arrested and were also prevented from meeting with lawyers. On January 6, 2019, it was announced that the minors had been arrested on suspicion of involvement in the murder. On January 10, four of the minors were released but kept under house arrest. On January 15, a Statement of Claimant was filed in court by the prosecutor on the intention to file an indictment against the 16-year-old minor who remained in detention.

During these weeks Shin Bet came under fire from settler and pro-settler groups who accused it of torturing the suspects. Shin Bet denied the allegation and released evidence from the investigation to justify why it had to keep the minors detained. Among the evidence was an Israeli flag with a swastika drawn over the Star of David and the text "Death to Zionists" written on it.

On January 24, 2019, an indictment was filed against the minor on suspicion of manslaughter, stone throwing at a vehicle and intentional sabotage of a vehicle, all under the circumstances of a terrorist act. According to the indictment, the minor threw a rock that weighs close to two kilograms in order to harm vehicle passengers of Arab descent. The main evidence was a DNA sample from the suspect found on the stone that killed al-Rabi. According to the suspect the find could perhaps be explained by him spitting while walking around in the area. Several Israeli rabbis raised money for the legal expenses of the suspect, including Chaim Druckman, Dov Lior, Yaakov Ariel, and Yehoshuʻa Shapira.

In May 2019, a forensic investigation concluded that the damage to Aisha al-Rabi's skull might be inconsistent with that of being hit by a single rock. The chief pathologist at the National Center of Forensic Medicine at Abu Kabir, Dr. Hen Kugel, stated regarding the wounds: "In searching the professional literature, there was no case found in which such broad wounds [found on the victim] were the result of one strike of a stone." However, he noted that he was one of seven pathologists at Abu Kabir who studied the case and only two of them agreed with his conclusion, two found the evidence inconclusive, and two believed that the evidence indeed showed that the wounds had been caused by a single rock. The minor was subsequently released to house arrest. In May 2020, it was reported that he had been allowed to return home to his settlement in the West Bank.

=== Compensation ===
Israeli victims of political violence or their relatives are eligible for compensation from the Israeli National Insurance Institute. In January 2020, it was revealed that Aisha al-Rabi's family was not eligible for compensation because she was not an Israeli citizen. Though the family would have the right to appeal to an inter-governmental committee the Israeli Defense Ministry said. Nabila Kaboub, one of the lawyers representing al-Rabi's family said she would appeal the decision. She further demanded that the defendant's home be demolished, referring to the Israeli policy of demolishing homes belonging to Palestinian attackers.

In August 2020, the Israeli government offered NIS 670,000 in compensation to the family. The family who had demanded over NIS 7,000,000 in compensation rejected the government's offer.

=== Conviction ===
In March 2026, the settler, now age 24, was convicted of manslaughter as an act of terrorism. He was sentenced in September to 13 years in prison and a NIS 258,000 ($85,500) fine to the victim's family.

== See also ==
- Israeli settler violence
- Jewish Israeli stone-throwing
- List of violent incidents in the Israeli–Palestinian conflict, 2018
- Yitzhar
