= Haim Drukman =

Israeli rabbi and politician (1932–2022)

- חיים דרוקמן
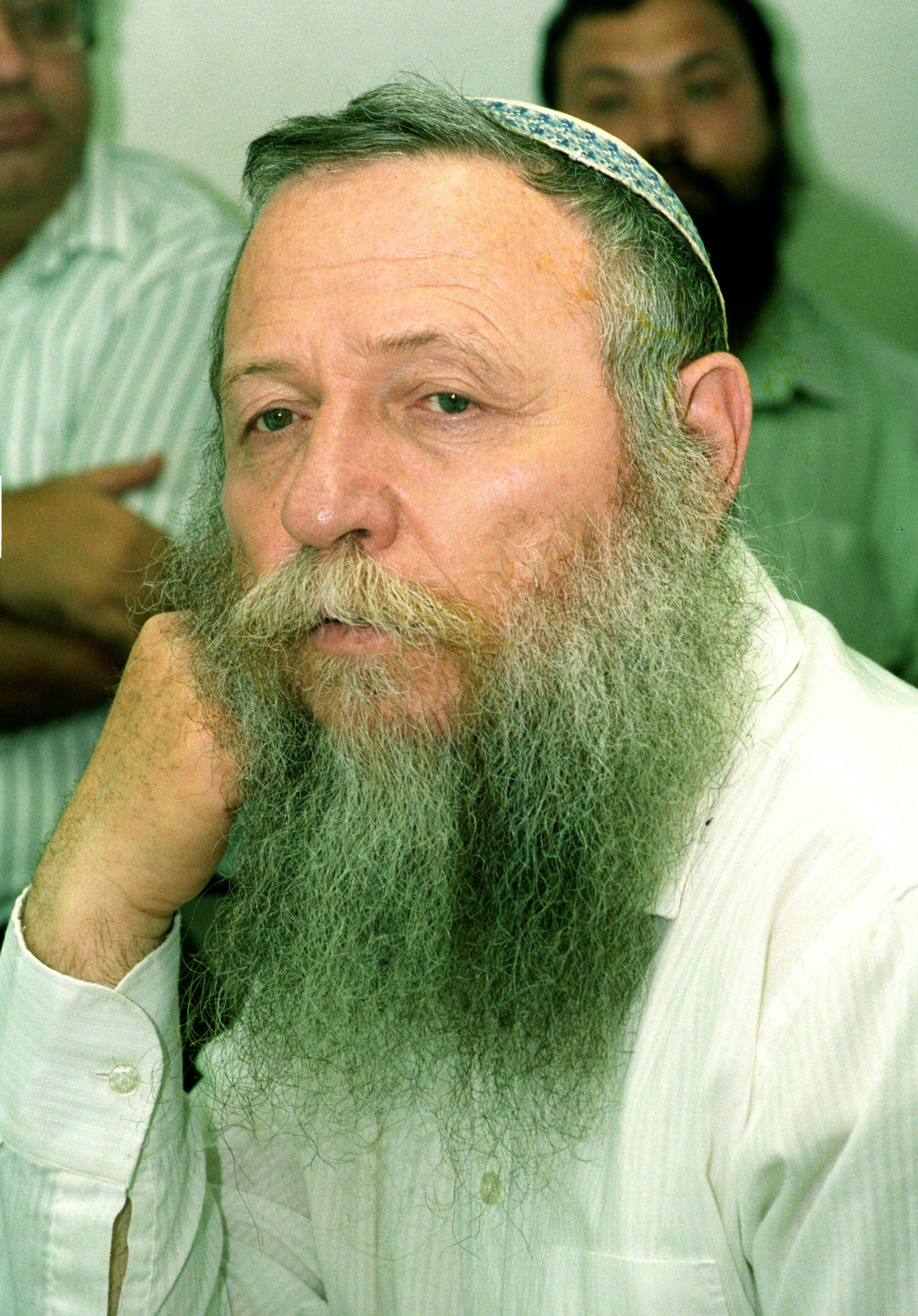
- Drukman in 1982

Faction represented in the Knesset
- 1977–1983: National Religious Party
- 1983–1984: Independent
- 1984–1986: Morasha
- 1986–1988: National Religious Party
- 1999–2003: National Religious Party

Personal details
- Born: 15 November 1932 Kuty, Poland
- Died: 25 December 2022 (aged 90) Jerusalem

Haim Drukman (Hebrew: חיים דרוקמן; 15 November 1932 – 25 December 2022) was an Israeli Orthodox rabbi and politician. The most senior spiritual leader of the Religious Zionist community at the time of his death, he served as rosh yeshiva (dean) of Yeshivat Or Etzion, and head of the Center for Bnei Akiva Yeshivot.

A founder of Gush Emunim, Drukman served in the Israeli Knesset as a member of the National Religious Party and Morasha. As director of the State Conversion Authority, he worked to make Jewish conversions more accessible to immigrant Russians of Jewish descent. He was awarded the Israel Prize for his contribution to society and education.

== Early life ==
Haim Meir Drukman was born in Kuty in the Second Polish Republic (today in Ukraine). His mother's name was Milkah. After hiding with his parents during the Holocaust, he immigrated to Mandate Palestine in 1944 by posing as the child of a different set of parents. He was reunited with his real parents after World War II. In 1949, Drukman joined the Israel Defense Forces as part of the Bnei Akiva gar'in (pioneer group) in the Nahal brigade. In this capacity, he took part in the rebuilding of two religious kibbutzim, Tirat Zvi and Sa'ad, which were damaged in the 1948 Arab–Israeli War. After his discharge, Drukman studied at the Aliyah Institute in Petah Tikva and Yeshivat Kfar Haroeh. He then transferred to the Mercaz HaRav yeshiva in Jerusalem, where he became a student of Zvi Yehuda Kook. In 1952, he became a member of Bnei Akiva's National Directorate, and from 1955 until 1956, he served as an emissary of the organisation to the United States, at Kook's behest.

== Rabbinic career ==
In 1964, once again with his teacher's encouragement, Drukman founded Yeshivat Or Etzion, a Bnei Akiva-affiliated mamlachti dati (state religious) high school, in Merkaz Shapira. In 1977, he established a hesder yeshiva there, which for many years was the largest one in the country. He remained rosh yeshiva (dean) there for the rest of his life. In 1995, he founded Ohr MeOfir there, an academy for high school graduates of the Ethiopian community. Since 1996, he had also been the head of the Center for Bnei Akiva Yeshivot and ulpanot (girls-only high schools) in Israel. Drukman has been criticized for failing to report sexual abuse that occurred at Netiv Meir Yeshiva and for inviting Mordechai Elon to speak at Yeshivat Or Etzion after he was convicted of sexual assault.

In response to a wave of emigration of Jews from the former Soviet Union in the 1990s, a considerable number of whom having questions as to their Jewishness, Drukman became involved in Jewish conversion advocacy, even setting up a special beth din (religious court) for this purpose. In 2004, he was appointed director of the newly created State Conversion Authority, which provides services to candidates for conversion to Judaism through the Prime Minister's Office. Throughout this period, he often came into disagreement with senior Haredi rabbis in Israel in regard to his conversion standards, which they deemed to be too lax according to their reading of halakha (Jewish law). After rabbinic courts rolled back thousands of Drukman's conversions, the Supreme Court of Israel reinstated them. Drukman's efforts were recognised by Benjamin Netanyahu, who said that the rabbi "found a way of bringing hearts together that helped masses of new immigrants to join the ranks of our people".

== Political career ==
Drukman was considered to be the most influential spiritual leader of Religious Zionism. He was instrumental in shifting this sector over from the centre-left, where it had been during Israel's founding, to the far right.

For close to 50 years, many political campaigns and deals involving Religious Zionism were forged in Drukman's living room. In 1974, he played a leading role in the establishment of Gush Emunim, an ultranationalist right-wing settler organisation.

Drukman was first elected to the Knesset in the 1977 elections on the National Religious Party's (NRP) list and served as a member of the 9th Knesset from 1977 to 1981. He was a member of the Knesset committees for the Appointment of Rabbinic Judges, Foreign Affairs and Defense, and Education and Culture during this tenure.

He was re-elected in 1981, again representing the National Religious Party in the 10th Knesset from 1981 to 1984 and serving as a member of the same Knesset committees as he had during the 9th Knesset. He was appointed Deputy Minister of Religious Affairs on 11 August 1981. However, he resigned on 2 March 1982 in protest against the final withdrawal of Israel from Sinai Peninsula as part of the Camp David Accords. On 10 October 1983, he broke away from the NRP and attempted to form a Knesset faction named the Zionist Religious Camp, but was refused permission to do so by the House Committee. Instead, he sat as a single member of Knesset for the remainder of his term.

In the run-up to the 1984 elections, he and Avraham Verdiger formed a new party, Morasha. It won two seats, taken by the two founders. Although the party joined the government, neither Drukman nor Verdiger were given cabinet posts. On 29 July 1986, Drukman left Morasha and returned to the NRP. While serving this tenure in the 11th Knesset, he was a member of the Knesset committee for Foreign Affairs and Defense and the subcommittee for the Examination of the Draft Exemption of Yeshiva Students. At the end of the term in 1988, he left the Knesset, choosing instead to express his political views from outside that body.

Drukman returned to serve his final four-year term during the 15th Knesset from 1999 to 2003, again as a representative for the National Religious Party. He was a member of the committees for Foreign Affairs and Defense, the Appointment of Rabbinic Judges, and Internal Affairs and Environment, as well as a member on the special committees for the Discussion of the Security Service Law, and on Addictions, Drugs, and the Challenges Facing Young Israelis.

In his later years, Drukman threw his support behind The Jewish Home party of Naftali Bennett, and, finally, the Religious Zionist Party under Bezalel Smotrich. Drukman was instrumental in bridging the gap between Smotrich and Benjamin Netanyahu when the latter sought to put together a right-wing coalition government. Drukman even invited Mansour Abbas to his home, in order to explore the possibility of including the United Arab List in a narrow right-wing coalition. Before his death, he was placed honorary last spot on Religious Zionist Party list on 2022 Israeli legislative election.

== Opinions ==
Drukman was a proponent of the confluence of the three concepts of Israel: The Nation of Israel keeping the Torah of Israel in the Land of Israel. He took part in a Passover Seder in newly occupied Hebron in 1968, which eventually led to the founding of an Israeli settlement in that city.

Drukman opposed the evacuation of Yamit in 1982, moving there temporarily with his family in order to make a political statement. He also protested against the Gaza disengagement in 2005. He issued a ruling to soldiers to avoid being involved in these kinds of situations, and, where that was not possible, to refuse such orders. On the other hand, Drukman urged his followers to refrain from taking part in a massive protest against conscription of yeshiva students that was held in Jerusalem in 2014.

According to The Times of Israel, he was less extreme than some of his colleagues. For example, Drukman did not support a controversial letter penned by rabbis in 2010 that called for Jews to refrain from letting homes to Arabs. He did say, however, that there may be some instances where this ruling might still be appropriate.

Drukman had a history of public support for Jewish extremists, including raising money for a settler charged with the killing of Aisha al-Rabi.

== Personal life ==
Drukman lived in Merkaz Shapira with his wife Sarah, one of the first religious women to graduate as a physician from the Hebrew University of Jerusalem. Together, they had nine children, including one who was adopted and another who had Down syndrome, along with dozens of grandchildren and great-grandchildren.

In 1993, while he was traveling in a car to nearby Kiryat Arba, a Palestinian man opened fire on his car, killing Drukman's driver, but failing to kill him. Although it was not clear that Drukman was specifically targeted, nevertheless, he was provided with Shin Bet protection until the threat level subsided.

He died on 25 December 2022, at age 90, at Hadassah Medical Center in Jerusalem, after becoming infected with COVID-19 two weeks prior.

== Notable students ==
Drukman had an outsized influence on Israel's populace, especially in the Religious Zionist sector. Many of the thousands of students from his schools went on to serve in important political, military, and educational positions in the country, including:

- Naftali Bennett, Israeli prime minister
- Yossi Cohen, Mossad director
- Benny Gantz, Israeli general and politician
- Yoaz Hendel, Israeli politician
- Israel Katz, Israeli politician
- Orit Strook, Israeli politician

== Awards and recognition ==
In 2012, Drukman was awarded the Israel Prize for his contribution to society and education.
