= Shani Taragin =

American–Israeli Modern Orthodox and Religious Zionist author and educator

Rabbanit Shani Taragin שני טרגין

Personal life
- Born: 1970 (age 55–56)
- Spouse: Reuven Taragin
- Education: Bar-Ilan University

Religious life
- Religion: Judaism
- Denomination: Modern Orthodoxy, Religious Zionism
- Organisation: Matan Women's Institute for Torah Studies, Herzog College
- Residence: Alon Shevut

Rabbanit Shani Taragin (Hebrew: שני טרגין; born 1974) is an American–Israeli Modern Orthodox and Religious Zionist author, educator, and lecturer specializing in Tanakh and Talmud. She is the Educational Director for World Mizrachi-Religious Zionists of America and of Matan Eshkolot at Matan Women's Institute for Torah Studies. She is also a Yoetzet Halacha (halachic advisor).

== Biography ==
Rabbanit Taragin was born Shani Feiner in 1974 in America. She completed a B.A. and M.A. in Tanach and Talmud at Bar-Ilan University following high school. She is also a graduate of Nishmat’s Keren Ariel Program for certification as a Yoetzet Halacha in issues of family purity law.

Taragin is a member of the "Tanakh b'govah ha'einayim" (Tanakh at eye-level) school of thought, predominantly modeled by the scholars of Yeshivat Har Etzion and Herzog College, which integrates traditional Jewish exegesis with modern academic methodologies. One of the prominent themes Taragin emphasizes in her writings and lectures is the significance of Torat Eretz Yisrael. In her role as Educational Director for World Mizrachi-Religious Zionists of America and of Matan Eshkolot at Matan Women's Institute for Torah Studies, she has served as a mentor and influence for many Tanach educators in North America. She teaches at a number of institutions in Israel, including Matan, Midreshet Lindenbaum, Migdal Oz, Midreshet Torah V'Avodah, and Shaalvim for Women. She also serves as Rosh Beit Midrash for the Beit Medrash Program in Machaneh Moshava Pennsylvania along with her husband, Rabbi Reuven Taragin.

== Personal ==
Rabbanit Taragin is married to Rabbi Reuven Taragin, Director of the Overseas Program at Yeshivat Hakotel. They reside in Alon Shevut and have six children.
