= Simcha Krauss =

American Zionist and rabbi (1937–2022)

Rabbi Simcha Krauss (June 29, 1937 – January 20, 2022) was a rabbi associated with the liberal faction of Centrist Orthodoxy. He was known for his role in the Religious Zionists of America. After making aliyah in 2005, he was involved with Yeshivat Eretz HaTzvi in the Katamon neighbourhood of Jerusalem, returning to the US in 2014 to found the International Beit Din. He was part of a family of which he was the 13th of 14 generations of Rabbis.

== Life and career ==
Simcha Krauss was born in Chernivtsi on June 29, 1937 to Abraham Krauss who was then city's chief rabbi and Pearl Ginzberg, a homemaker. He spent his early childhood in Sibiu. After moving with family to United States in 1948, he studied at Yeshivat Chaim Berlin in New York under Rabbi Yitzchak Hutner (where he received Semikhah Yoreh Yoreh and Yadin Yadin), after which he studied at Rabbi Isaac Elchonon Theological Seminary under Rav Soloveitchik. He was a close student of the Rav, and wrote an essay in the Tradition magazine, entitled 'The Rav on Zionism, Universalism and Feminism'. He was a Maggid Shiur in Yeshiva University's IBC program for over two decades. He obtained a master's degree from the New School of Social Research at City College, and lectured in political science at a number of colleges. He spent many years as Rabbi of the Young Israel of Hillcrest, the Young Israel of St. Louis, and Congregation House of Jacob of Utica, N.Y. He advocated for the right of young women to read from the Torah at an Orthodox Jewish Bat-Mitzvah ceremony. He became president of the Religious Zionists of America before making aliya in 2005.

In his later years, he taught at Yeshivat Eretz HaTzvi in Jerusalem. In 2014, he returned to the United States to found the International Beit Din for Agunot, and served as its Founding Av Beit Din.

He died from complications during hip replacement surgery at a hospital in Jerusalem on January 20, 2022 at the age of 84.
