= Peshat =

Classic method of Jewish biblical exegesis

Peshat (also P'shat, פשט) is one of the two classic methods of Jewish biblical exegesis, the other being Derash. While Peshat is commonly defined as referring to the surface or literal (direct) meaning of a text, or "the plain literal meaning of the verse, the meaning which its author intended to convey", numerous scholars and rabbis have debated this for centuries, giving Peshat many uses and definitions.

Peshat is most often defined as "straight," in reference to its tendency to describe the meaning of the text apparent at face value, taking into account idiomatic expressions, and focusing mostly on literal interpretation. It is often considered the most straightforward method for reading and understanding of biblical text. In this way, Peshat differentiates itself from the other methods present in Pardes (Remez, Drash and Sod), which look at what may be hidden in the text. Peshat interpretations also note the importance of context, both historical and literary. This is in contrast to Drash, which will often take the text of a verse out of its context, for uses beyond the context such as ritual or moral purposes.

However, this does not mean that Peshat and Drash are fully opposing methods. In fact, one may often be used in helping to explain the other, in finding and defining nuances in text that might be otherwise inexplicable without application of both methods.

== Talmudic usage ==
The terms peshat and derash appear in various sources from the Talmudic period, though not with the same definitions used in later generations.

Linguistically, the term peshat finds its root in the Biblical Hebrew term meaning "to flatten out," or "to extend." In the Talmudic Era, this definition was expanded to mean "to propound." Generally, in sources from this period, the peshat interpretation of a passage is "the teaching recognized by the public as obviously authoritative, since familiar and traditional," or "the usual accepted traditional meaning as it was generally taught."

While Talmudic rabbis made interpretations whose method could be categorized (in modern terms) as peshat or drash, their use of the term peshat did not indicate any particular methodology. In fact, the Talmudic rabbis only practiced a single method of interpretation. When they labeled their interpretation "peshat", it is often actually what modern sources would categorize as derash, and many variant stories or texts use both peshat and derash to refer to the same interpretation. While some interpretation from this era meet the modern definition of peshat, the Talmudic rabbis themselves did not conceive of peshat as a distinct methodological category.

From some sources, a distinction between the verbs pashat and lamad (למד, "to study") is apparent: pashat refers to thorough and intensive learning of a text, in contrast to the surface reading signified by lamad. In this understanding, peshat does not refer specifically to the literal meaning of a text, but rather to whatever meaning can be extracted from intensive study, and by extension to "the usual, accepted meaning [of a text] as it was generally taught".

According to one understanding, peshat in early rabbinic sources is a synonym for verse (like mikra or katuv), i.e. "what is in the verse itself". In some passages from the Talmudic era, peshat refers to the literal meaning of the words of the verse, as opposed to the interpretations or halakhic conclusions that should be drawn from the verse. This distinction does not equate to the modern distinction between peshat and drash, as (for example) if one verse were contradicted by another, the reconciliation of the verses would not be considered peshat by Talmudic standards (as it is not based solely on the verse in question), but might be considered peshat by modern standards.

Often when defining peshat, a quote from the Shabbat tractate of Talmud is referenced, stating "a verse cannot be taken away from the meaning of its peshat" (אין מקרא יוצא מידי פשוטו). Mentions of peshat in the Talmud include:

- Rabbi Kahana objected to Mar son of R. Huna: But this refers to the words of the Torah? A verse cannot depart from its plain meaning (פשוטו), he replied. R. Kahana said: By the time I was eighteen years old I had studied the whole Talmud, yet I did not know that a verse cannot depart from its plain meaning (פשוטו) until today. What does he inform us? That a man should study and subsequently understand.
- Others say: According to the rabbis no question arises, for since the text has once been torn away from its ordinary meaning (פשוטו) it must in all respects so remain.
- Said Raba: Although throughout the Torah no text loses its ordinary meaning (פשוטו), here the gezerah shawah has come and entirely deprived the text of its ordinary meaning (פשוטו).

== Medieval and modern usage ==
The common meaning of peshat likely originates with Rashi, who in his biblical commentary was the first to clearly distinguish between peshat and derash as the literal and homiletical meanings of a verse respectively. This usage was adopted by many medieval commentators, and later by modern writers. Some have incorrectly projected this usage onto the Talmudic passages as well.

Abraham Ibn Ezra is quoted in his writings as saying that the rabbis of the Talmud were well-versed in Peshat, having built their Midrashic exegeses on it: "They [the talmudic rabbis] knew peshat better than all the generations that came after them." In contrast, Rashbam, felt that the early rabbis were not knowledgeable in Peshat, and instead used other strategies. Consequently, these rabbis were led to opposing conclusions of the rabbis' halachic exegesis: Rashbam understood this as a separate type of exegesis from Peshat, while Ibn Ezra felt that the only proper exegesis would lead to his own conclusions, and therefore disregarded the midrashim of the Talmudic rabbis as exegesis altogether. Regardless of these differences in opinion in reference to the rabbis of the Talmud, both Ibn Ezra and Rashbam favored and promoted Peshat as a superior alternative to Midrashic methods.

One of Rashbam's students, Rabbi Eliezer of Beaugency, is noted as completely removing Drash from his exegetical strategies, relying solely on Peshat. In comparison to Rashbam's tendency to explain how his views would contrast with those of talmudic rabbis, Rabbi Eliezer is not compelled to do so, feeling that Peshat is the only proper way to look at text. As Peshat's methods rely often on the importance of context, Rabbi Eliezer's commentaries are known for their tendency to focus on the context of a given verse or text. His commentaries are integrated with text, rather than sitting separate from them, and he insists on ensuring that no verse loses its context during his discussions, in comparison to other methods, such as the "verse-by-verse approach of Rashi"

David Kimhi (Radak) was also known for his ability in Peshat, and was influenced both by Ibn Ezra and Rashi. While Kimhi preferred Peshat methods over Derash, the influence of Rashi can be seen in some of his commentaries, in the inclusion of midrashic citations. Additionally, Kimhi lived among many famed proponents of Derash, such as Rabbi Moses the Preacher, who "undoubtedly had a substantial impact on Radak." Kimhi tended to go out of his way to reject the views of the rabbis of the Talmud often, which has led to the theory that, although disagreeing with them, Kimhi fully acknowledged the tradition and authority of the talmud rabbis. In his commentaries, Kimhi labels his interpretation as Peshat, and that of the talmudic rabbis as Derash, creating a strict divide between the two in his writings.

A student of Saadiah Gaon is recorded as saying: "This is the sign by which you should know which comments well and which comments badly: Any commentator who first comments with peshuto shel mikra in concise language, and afterwards brings some of our rabbis' midrash, this is a good commentary, and the reverse is [a] crude [commentary].

The modern approach of "Tanach at Eye Level" led by Rabbi Yaakov Medan and Rabbi Dr. Yoel Bin-Nun, and promoted by many of the rabbis and alumni of Yeshivat Har Etzion is an approach to studying Tanach which in essence follows in the footsteps of the Rashbam, Iben Ezra and Radak in sticking more closely to the Peshat and straightforward way of understanding the Bible.

== See also ==
- Rabbinic literature
- Torah study

== Bibliography ==
- Angel, Rabbi Hayyim. "From Black Fire to White Fire: Conversations about Religious Tanakh Methodology." The Institute for Jewish Ideas and Ideals. 4 Sept. 2008. Web.
- Berger, Yitzhak. "The Contextual Exegesis of Rabbi Eliezer of Beaugency and the Climax of the Northern French Peshat Tradition." Jewish Studies Quarterly 15.2 (2008): 115–29. Print.
- Berger, Yitzhak. "Peshat and the Authority of Ḥazal in the Commentaries of Radak." Association for Jewish Studies Review 31.1 (2007): 41–59. Print.
- Rabinowitz, Louis Isaac (2007). "Peshat". In Berenbaum, Michael; Skolnik, Fred (eds.). Encyclopaedia Judaica. Vol. 16 (2nd ed.). Detroit: Macmillan Reference. pp. 8–9. ISBN 978-0-02-866097-4 – via Gale Virtual Reference Library.
- Garfinkel, Stephen. "Clearing Peshat and Derash." Hebrew Bible/Old Testament - The History of Its Interpretation. Comp. Chris Brekelmans and Menahem Haran. Ed. Magne Sæbø. Göttingen: Vandenhoeck & Ruprecht, 2000. 130–34. Print.
- Eran Viezel, ‘The Rise and Fall of Jewish Philological Exegesis on the Bible in the Middle Ages: Causes and Effects,’ Review of Rabbinic Judaism 20 (2017), pp. 48–88
- Eran Viezel, ‘On the Medieval Rabbinic Assumption that the Early Sages Knew the Peshat,’ Journal of Jewish Studies 70 (2019), pp. 256–275
- Goldin, S. (2007). Unlocking the Torah Text: Bereishit. Gefen Publishing. ISBN 978-965-229-412-8
- Lockshin, Martin I. "Lonely Man of Peshat." Jewish Quarterly Review 99.2 (2009): 291–300. Print.
- Rabinowitz, Louis. "The Talmudic Meaning of Peshat." Tradition: A Journal of Orthodox Thought 6.1 (1963). Web.
- Cohen, Mordechai Z. (2020). The Rule of Peshat: Jewish Constructions of the Plain Sense of Scripture in Their Christian and Muslim Contexts. University of Pennsylvania Press. ISBN 978-0-8122-5212-5.
