= Hesder =

Israeli yeshiva program combining Torah study and military service

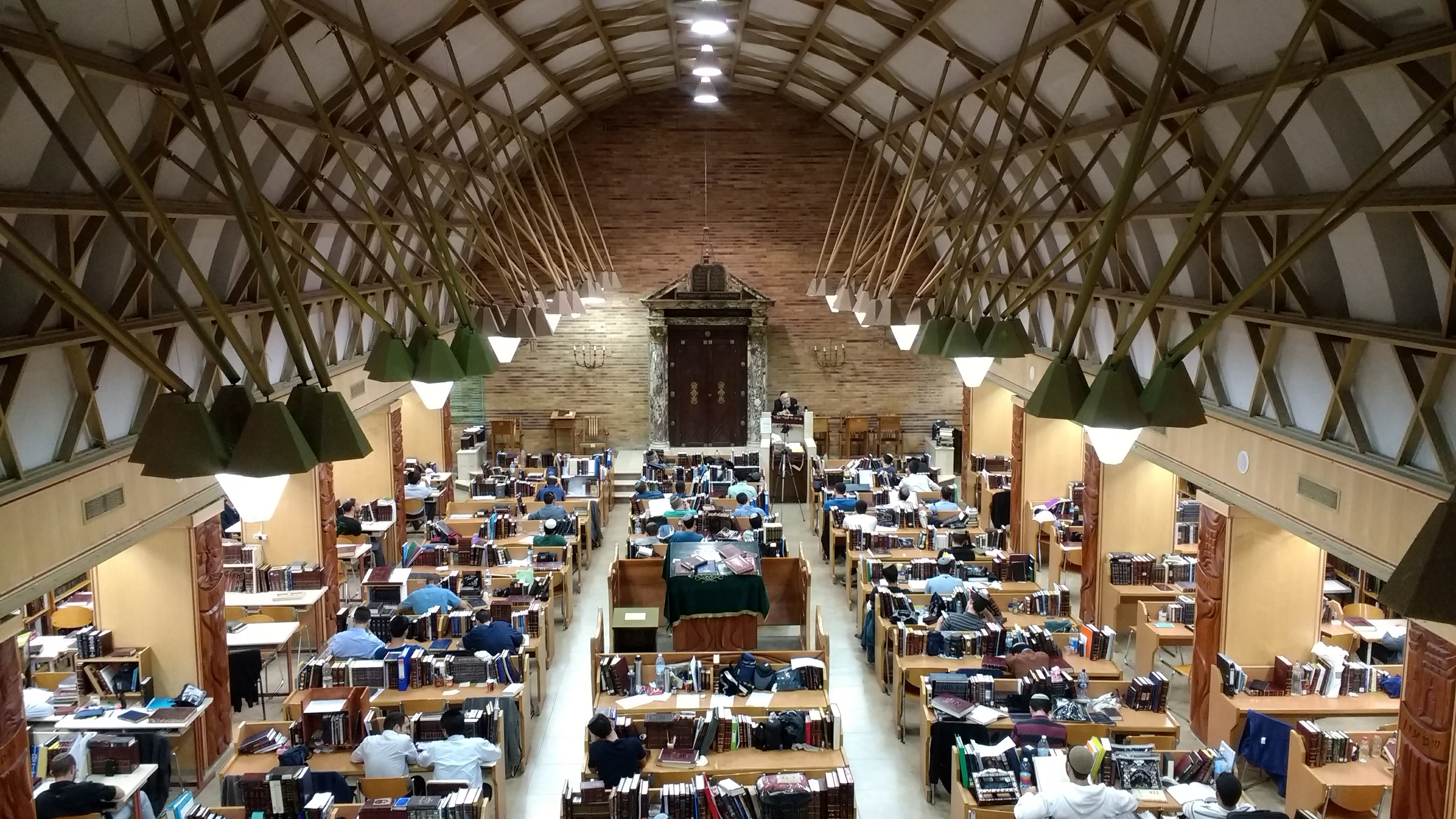
Beit Midrash of the Kerem B'Yavneh hesder yeshiva

Hesder (Hebrew: הסדר 'arrangement'; also Yeshivat Hesder ישיבת הסדר) is an Israeli yeshiva program which combines advanced Talmudic studies with military service in the Israel Defense Forces, usually within a Religious Zionist framework. The program allows Orthodox Jewish men to serve in the Israeli military while still engaging in Torah study.

== Description ==
Hesder service usually lasts a total of five years, within which participants are officially soldiers in the IDF. Through those five years, 16 months are dedicated to actual army service, comprising both training and active duty. In some Hesder Yeshivas, service lasts six years, of which 24 months are army service. Almost all Hesder Yeshiva students serve in the army as combat soldiers. The remainder of the time in Hesder is designated for full-time Torah study. Some students study for several years after this mandatory term. Yeshivot Hesder typically have 150–300 students; some of the larger yeshivot have up to 500 students, while some have fewer than 100 students. The largest is the Hesder Yeshiva of Sderot.

The Hesder program generally starts with a year of torah study as a civilian before joining the Army on paper, but immediately going on unpaid leave, and going back to the Yeshiva. After 6-12 months, (the following March or August) depending on the Yeshiva's program, Hesder students join the army proper for 16 months. After their active period in the army, Hesder students return to Yeshiva for a further mandatory 16 months (16+16 months = 32 months, the mandatory minimum period in the Israeli army for conscripts) where they are on unpaid leave.

The typical Yeshivat Hesder functions along the lines of a traditional Orthodox yeshiva, with an emphasis on in-depth study of the Talmud. However, the curriculum of a Hesder yeshiva often additionally includes an increased focus on Tanakh and Jewish philosophy. In addition, most Yeshivot Hesder encourage their students to spend time helping the needy in surrounding communities.

Many of the Yeshivot Hesder also support a Kollel, and offer a Semicha ("rabbinic ordination") program, usually in preparation for the "Semicha of the Rabbanut"; many Hesder graduates would also obtain semicha from Rabbi Zalman Nechemia Goldberg. Since 1990, various hesder yeshivot have established, or are associated with, teachers' institutes. Graduates of these yeshivot are thus often active in the educational system of the national-religious, both as rabbis and as teachers.

A number have programs for students from the Diaspora ("overseas programs") lasting one or two years; these vary in size from about ten people to over a hundred and fifty. The most prominent of these programs are those of Yeshivat Kerem B'Yavneh, Yeshivat Hakotel, Yeshivat Sha'alvim, and Yeshivat Har Etzion.

As an alternative to Hesder, some male high school students opt to study at a one-year mechina, and then proceed to a regular period of military service.

Students at Mercaz HaRav, and some Hardal yeshivot, such as Har Hamor, undertake their Service through a modified framework called "Hesder Mercaz"; where students study Torah for around five years before serving actively for seven months, usually serving in the artillery. Yeshivat Ma'ale Gilboa through a framework called shiluv, integrates two years of Torah study with the full three years military service.

== History ==
The idea of hesder yeshivas is attributed to Yehuda Amital, a rabbi and Israeli politician who served in the Haganah, fought in the 1948 Arab–Israeli War. After writing an essay about the religious and moral aspects of military service, he envisaged a program for combining army service and Torah study. Following the Six-Day War, Rav Amital became the founding Rosh Yeshiva of Yeshivat Har Etzion, a Hesder Yeshiva in Alon Shevut that Amital headed for 40 years.

The first yeshivat hesder, Kerem B'Yavneh, was established in 1953 modelled on Nahal, a unit combining time on a (frontier) agricultural settlement with army service. However, while the Nahal model focuses on agricultural labor, the Hesder framework replaces the settlement component with intensive Torah study at the yeshiva.

In 1991, the hesder yeshiva program was awarded the Israel Prize for its special contribution to society and the State of Israel.

A new Knesset law on Haredi yeshiva student exemptions addresses the legal status of Hesder service and yeshivot.

In 2011, there were 68 hesder yeshivas in Israel, with a total of over 8,500 students.

== List of Yeshivot ==
- Yeshivat Kerem B'Yavneh (1953)
- Yeshivat Sha'alvim (1961)
- Yeshivat HaKotel (1967)
- Yeshivat Har Etzion (1968)
- Yeshivat Kiryat Arba (1972)
- Yeshivat HaGolan 1973)
- Yeshivat Maalot (1974)
- Yeshivat Neveh Dekalim (Ashdod) (1976)
- Yeshivat Kiryat Shmonah (1977)
- Yeshivat Birkat Moshe – Maaleh Adumim (1977)
- Yeshivat Shvut Yisrael, Efrat (1977)
- Yeshivat Or Etzion (1977)
- Yeshivat Shilo (1979)
- Yeshivat Karnei Shomron (1981)
- Yeshivat Dimona (1989)
- Yeshivat Beit Orot Har HaZeitim (1990)
- Yeshivat Midbarah K'Eden, Mitzpe Ramon (1991)
- Yeshivat Har Bracha (1991)
- Yeshivat Otniel (1993)
- Yeshivat Sderot (1994)
- Yeshivat Shadmot Neryah (1994)
- Yeshivat Hesder Ramat Gan (1994)
- Yeshivat Yerucham (1994)
- Yeshivat Birkat Yosef—Elon Moreh(1995)
- Yeshivat Hameiri (1995)
- Yeshivat Nahariya (1995)
- Yeshivat Heichal Eliyahu (1996)
- Yeshivat Siyach Yitzchak] (1996)
- Yeshivat Tzfat (1997)
- Yeshivat Orot Ashkelon (1998)
- Yeshivat Ayelet Hashachar—Eilat (1998)
- Yeshivat Rishon L'Zion (1998)
- Yeshivat Orot Shaul-Tel Aviv (1998)
- Yeshivat Itamar (1998)
- Yeshivat Tekoa (1999)
- Yeshivat Maaleh Efraim (2000)
- Yeshivat Shavei Shomron (2000)
- Yeshivat Reuta (2000)
- Yeshivat Netivot (2001)
- Yeshivat Orot Aviv (2001)
- Yeshivat Tfachot (2001)
- Yeshivat Binot, Raanana (2002)
- Yeshivat Har Shalom (2002)
- Yeshivat Ruach Tsfonit, Akko (2003)
- Yeshivat Or Vishua – Haifa (2003)
- Yeshivat Karmiel (2003)
- Yeshivat Holon (2004)
- Yeshivat Birkat Ha'Torah – Shavei Shomron (2004)
- Yeshivat Netzer Mattei (2005)
- Yeshivat Meir Harel, (Modi'in) (2005)
- Yeshivat Moreshet Yaacov – Rehovot
- Beit Orot (2005)
- Yeshivat Hesder Kiryat Gat (2006)
- Yeshivat Beit She'an (2006)
- Yeshivat Ramat Hasharon (2007)
- Yeshivat Afula (2008)
- Yeshivat Shirat Moshe Yaffo (2008)
- Yeshivat Natzrat Elite (2010)
- Yeshivat Orot Moshe, Rosh Haayin (2012)
- Yeshivat Givat Olga (2015)
- Yeshivat Lev Hatorah
- Yeshivat Torah v'Avodah

== See also ==
- Haim Drukman
- Jewish fundamentalism
- List of Israel Prize recipients
- Midrasha
- Netzah Yehuda Battalion
- Religion in Israel
- Religious Zionism#Educational institutions & #Military service
- Sherut Leumi
- Haredi conscription in Israel
- Yeshiva#Israel
