= Yeshivat Ma'alot =

Coordinates: 33.0136°N 35.2871°E

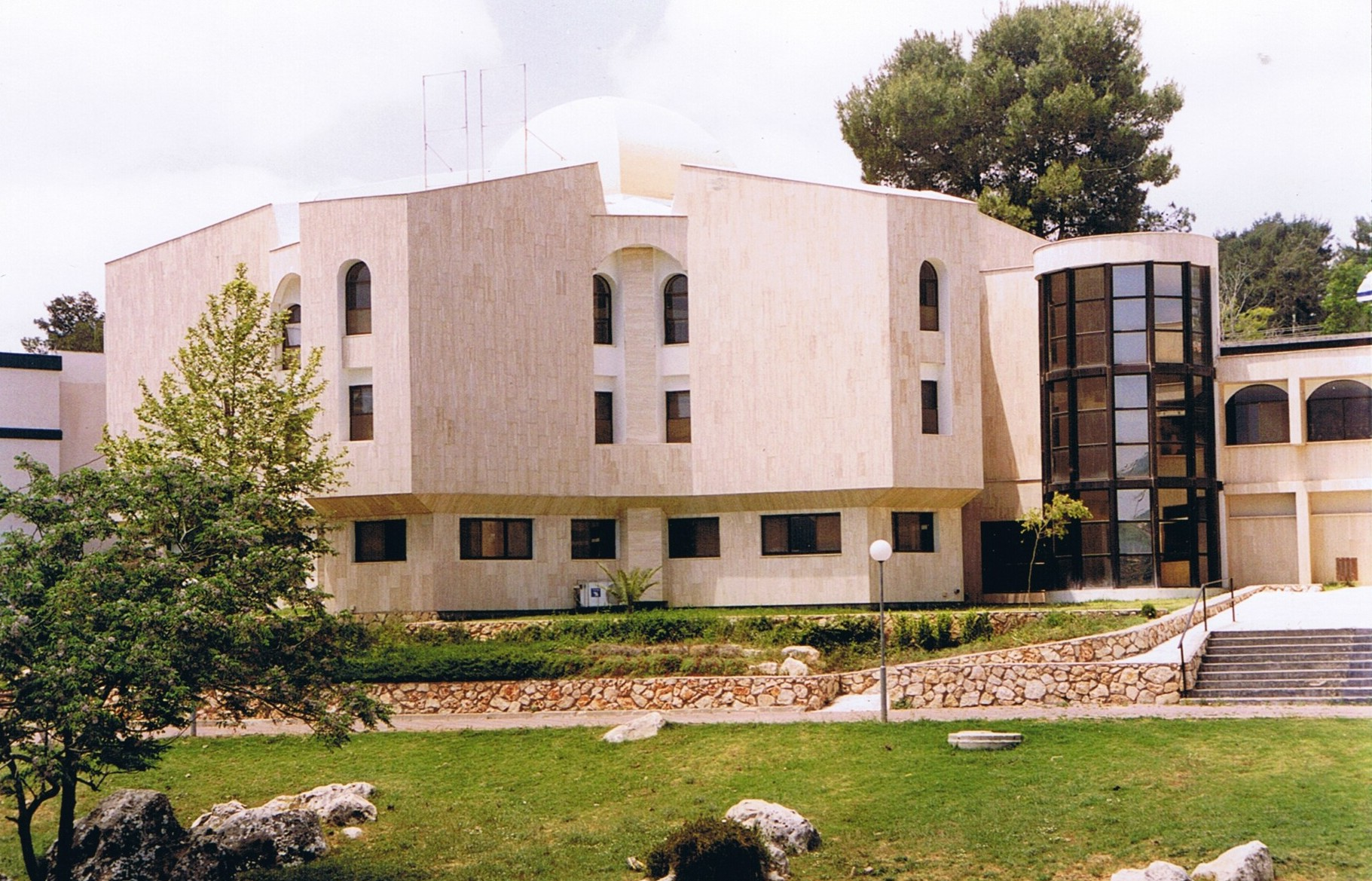

Yeshivat Ma'alot Ya'akov (Hebrew: ישיבת מעלות יעקב) is a Hesder Yeshiva, founded in 1975 in the town of Maalot following the Ma'alot massacre. The Yeshiva is named after Rabbi Dr. Ya'akov Herzog, son of the late Chief Rabbi of Israel Yitzhak HaLevi Herzog and brother of the late President of Israel Chaim Herzog. The Rosh Yeshiva is Rabbi Yehoshua Weitzman.

There are over 300 students in the yeshiva and kollel. The yeshiva also has a program for overseas students headed by Rabbi Ariel Friedman.

Yeshivat Ma'alot is known for its emphasis on learning Torat Eretz Yisrael according to Rabbi Abraham Isaac Kook’s teachings.

Graduates of the yeshiva have founded four other branches in different locations:

- Acre (hesder) headed by Rabbi Yosef Stern.
- Holon (hesder) headed by Rabbi Elazar Aharonson.
- Ashdod (formerly Neve Dekalim), headed by Rabbi David Gavrieli. The Yeshiva was removed from original location as a result of Israel's unilateral disengagement plan from the Gaza Strip during the summer of 2005.
- Netiv Tefachot, a post high-school yeshiva where students pursue both yeshiva and technological studies headed by Rabbi Avigdor Weitzman and Rabbi Eyal Griner.
