= Chaim Flom =

Israeli rabbi (1951–2008)

Chaim Flom (Hebrew: חיים פלאם; July 6, 1951 – May 19, 2008) was an American rabbi, scholar and Rosh Yeshiva of Yeshivat Ohr David in Jerusalem. Flom was born in Pittsburgh, Pennsylvania, and studied at Yeshivah Gedolah of Pittsburgh as the first enrolled student.

He founded Yeshivat Ohr David in 1980 with fellow Rosh Yeshivah, Rabbi Yosef Granofsky. He served in the Israel Defense Forces.
