= Jewish Israeli stone throwing =

Jewish Israeli stone throwing refers to rock-throwing activity by Jewish Israelis in Mandatory Palestine, Israel, the West Bank, the Gaza Strip and Jerusalem. It includes material about internecine stone throwing, in which Haredi Jews throw stones at other Jews as a protest against what they view as violations of religious laws concerning Shabbat, modest clothing for women and similar issues, and material about stone throwing by extremists in the settler movement.

== Historical incidents ==
Following The Sergeants affair, on the evening of 31 July 1947, groups of British policemen and soldiers went on the rampage in Tel Aviv, breaking the windows of shops and buses, overturning cars, stealing a taxi and assaulting members of the Jewish community. Groups of young Jews then took to the streets and started stoning police foot patrols, which were then withdrawn from the city. On learning of the stonings, without waiting for orders, members of mobile police units temporarily based at the Citrus House security compound drove into Tel Aviv in six armoured vehicles. These policemen opened fire on two buses, killing one Jew and injuring three others on the first bus and killing three more Jews on the second. Policemen also beat passersby, smashed shop windows, and raided two cafés, detonating a grenade in one of them. In one café, they attempted to abduct a Jew, and were beaten back by the patrons. Five Jews were killed and 15 injured.

In the aftermath of the Deir Yassin massacre of 1948, carried out by the Irgun and Lehi militias, in which an estimated 107 Palestinian villagers and 13 fighters were killed, and which followed the Yishuv's attempts to relieve the blockade of Jerusalem by Palestinian Arab forces during the civil war that preceded the end of British rule in Palestine, Palestinian survivors were loaded into trucks and then paraded through West Jerusalem while Jews spat at them and threw stones at them.

In accounts of the battle leading to the death of the Convoy of 35 in January 1948, one of the Jewish fighters is described as fighting until his ammunition runs out and then throwing rocks at the attacking Arab force. All 35 members of the convoy perished in battle.

== Haredi incidents ==
Haredi attacks against property, involving both stone throwing, vandalism and arson at bus stops, broke out in 1985–1986 to protest posters showing what they regarded as immodest women.

Jewish Orthodox Israelis threw stones at passing cars throughout 2009 to protest infractions of the Sabbath. Large scale protests broke out, involving stone throwing in June and July in response to the opening of a car park near the Old Quarter of Jerusalem. On 9 August, the Jerusalem city mayor Nir Barkat was stoned by dozens of Haredi demonstrators who held him responsible for the car park's opening.

Throwing stones at cars operated in violation of the Jewish Sabbath is practiced among the Haredi community of Jews, such as the Hasidic community. At the request of the Jerusalem police, the practice was halted during the First Intifada. Israeli police have also had stones thrown at them in protest for the operation of commercial establishments on Saturday. In Mea Shearim, women who sport ‘immodest dress’ have often been subject to stoning, though this has also been reported in Beit Shemesh. Members of the Women of the Wall, a protest group advocating for women's rights to pray at the Western Wall, have also been subject to stoning by the Haredim, as have demonstrators for gay rights. Sometimes, the Haredi stone throwing has a political nature, as in protesting the arrest of prominent members of the community arrested on suspicion of things like money-laundering and tax fraud. Palestinians in Shuafat's refugee camp have been targeted by Haredim from Ramat Shlomo. In October 2000, in the wake of demonstrations and rioting by Israeli Arabs and Palestinians that included stone throwing, the Hassan Bek Mosque in Jaffa was stoned by Jews, who tried to set it on fire.

Haredi Jewish stone throwing has also taken place to protest army recruitment and archaeological research. It is often carried out by Haredi Jews who believe a particular neighborhood or town belongs to them and wish to police it from any opposition. The activity among Israel's Haredi circles has been documented in Jerusalem since the early 1970s. According to a Hiddush spokesman, Haredi violence (including stone throwing) in Haredi-dominated neighbourhoods such as Mea Shearim has evolved from religious struggles to the mere entrance of government agencies or service providers.

Since several years prior to 2012, it became "commonplace" to throw stones at drivers violating what the stone-throwers regard as the sanctity of the holy day by driving on Hebron Road in Jerusalem on Yom Kippur eve, following the conclusion of prayer services.

== By settlers ==
Although there have been a number of instances of settlers throwing stones at Palestinians, settlers have also been known to throw stones at the Israel army. According to Daniel Byman, throwing stones at Palestinian cars is one of several violent techniques used by settlers to pressure the government not to crack down on extremists in their ranks.

The similarities between settler and Palestinian stone throwing have produce different responses from the IDF. According to B'Tselem, in Hebron where stone throwing is frequent, when settler youths stone both Palestinians or Christian Peacemaker Teams (CPT), the IDF is said to respond to complaints by saying that the stone-throwers are 'only kids', and arrests or interventions are rare. When Hebron Palestinian youths throw stones, the same units do not hesitate to arrest the culprits and blame their parents. Settlers are known to set ambushes and throw rocks at cars with Palestinian number plates, according to Neve Gordon, in order to terrorize them into not resisting their dispossession or to “persuade” them to leave certain areas. Yitzhar youths have stoned police cars entering their settlement.

Yehuda Shaul and Noam Chayut, who helped create Breaking the Silence, reported that young settler girls were seen throwing stones at an elderly woman carrying groceries bags, and when asked why they stoned her and they asked the soldier in turn if he knew what the aged Palestinian had done during the 1929 Hebron massacre. This was, for Shaul, a determining factor in shaking him out his moral stasis. According to a fieldworker with Christian Peacemaker Teams, settler youths had frequently stoned Palestinian children from Al Bowereh when they walked to school; CPT personnel escorted the children on their way to school to protect them. According to Sandy Tolan, Amnesty International and testimonies from Israeli soldiers, similar incidents have occurred at other areas of the South Hebron Hills, for example at places like Tuba and At-Tuwani where Palestinian children have been regularly pelted with stones and eggs, by settlers from Havat Ma'on, in addition to being set on by settlers’ dogs as they make their way to school. According to the CPT, in 2003, settlers from Ma'on, Har Hebron attacked with gunfire and rocks Palestinian farmers, Ta'ayush, and CPT activists who were attempting to plow a field.

Palestinian and Human Rights organisations such as Yesh Din and Rabbis for Human Rights have filmed settlers throwing stones at Palestinian farmers, and have laid formal complaints. In just one two-month period in 2017 nine such episodes were caught on video, often attesting to the presence of Israeli soldiers standing by as rocks are pelted, but no indictments were drawn up.

In 2015, an Israeli photographer caught Palestinians protecting an Israeli policewoman from settlers near Aish Kodesh throwing rocks at her.

Stone throwing has been used by Israeli settlers to prevent Palestinians from using roads the settlers consider theirs, or as settler revenge on un-related car drivers.

Israeli settlers are believed to be responsible for the death of Aisha Muhammad Talal al-Rabi, a 47-year-old mother of 8, al-Rabi, from the village of Biddya. The incident took place on 12 October 2018. The family car was hit with rocks as her husband was driving near the Za'atara checkpoint at Tapuach Junction and after he lost control of the vehicle when it was hit by a volley of stones, she was hit in the head with another rock. Five Israeli youths from the Israeli settlement of Rehelim were eventually detained. Four were released under house arrest in January, and the fifth, a minor charged with manslaughter, was also released under the same conditions in early May 2019. Subsequent to the incident her husband Yaqoub and her relatives had their permits to work in Israel cancelled.

== The Gaza Strip ==
During the Israeli occupation of the Gaza Strip, reports emerged of incidents of Jewish settlers throwing stones, particularly during the period running up to, and including the execution of the Israeli withdrawal of settlements from that zone. The latter move in 2005 was met by protests involving settlers throwing stones, targeting Palestinian houses at al-Mawasi close to Gush Katif. In one instance, a Palestinian youth, Haled el-Astal (16) was killed after being struck by a stones thrown by settlers who had occupied a Palestinian building and, when evicted, went on a rampage that led to a clash between the two parties near Tal Yam. A soldier of the IDF was present at the scene. Both sides threw stones, and two other Palestinians were injured. Later that year, in August, IDF troops ordered to oversee the evacuation were pelted with stones by both settlers and their sympathisers at Neve Dekalim.

== Israeli Ethiopians in Tel Aviv ==
Peter Beinart writes that similarities exist between political reactions in Israel and the United States to stone-throwing protests by Ethiopian Israelis and Afro-Americans. One condemns the violence, but calls are made to look into and attend to the problems that give rise to such episodes. He then asks why Israeli attitudes are different when the stone-throwers happen to be Palestinians. In the former instances, he argues, the grievances behind the violence are acknowledged and promises are made to redress them. The IDF website brands all Palestinian stone throwing as 'unprovoked', and as 'threats to the stability of the region', and yet Beinart thinks it absurd to characterize behaviour by 'people who have lived for almost a half-century under military law and without free movement, citizenship or the right to vote,' unprovoked.

== Disputed incidents ==
On 18 July 1988, Edmond Ghanem (17), a Palestinian Christian, was walking on a street in Beit Sahour adjacent to an Israeli "army rooftop lookout post near his home" when he was killed by either a stone or a "block of concrete" that fell on him. The Mayor of Beit Sahour, Hanna Atrash, told The Guardian that he had "heard the crash," saw Ghanem lying on the ground, then "looked up and saw a soldier holding his head in both hands with astonishment." The Israeli commander immediately sought out the family and explained to Edmond's father, Jalal, that "the concrete had been used to weigh down the lookout tent and had tipped over by accident." The Israeli Army permitted the family to hold a large funeral, which was attended by the entire village, turning the funeral into a protest march with villagers asserting that Ghanem was killed deliberately. Villagers alleged that an Israeli "soldier hurled the rock." An IDF investigation concluded it was a 'tragic accident', and that "the stone held down a tarpaulin to shade the soldiers on the roof and was knocked into the street by a gust of wind." A number of books and articles have repeated the assertion that a rock was deliberately thrown at Ghanem.

== Sentencing ==
Israeli newspaper Haaretz noted that sentencing terms for Jewish Israeli stone throwing are more lenient than those for non-Jews, particularly in the case of minors. It noted, for example, cases where the option to do community service was offered.

== Reactions ==
In May 2015, the Netherlands warned its citizens about travelling near West Bank settlements in the following terms: "Jewish settlers live in illegal settlements in the West Bank... These settlers organize on a regular basis demonstrations close to the roads. These demonstrations are sometimes violent. This happens when settlers throw rocks toward Palestinian and foreign vehicles." The warning specifically identified the hills around Hebron and Nablus as potentially dangerous, where the "extremist settlers are liable to be hostile."

== See also ==
- Palestinian stone throwing
- Stoning
