= Marbeh Torah =

Marbeh Torah was a Haredi yeshiva for English-speaking baalei teshuva, located in Bnei Brak.

The yeshiva had six rabbis and approximately 40 students, both married and unmarried men. At its height, it had even more than that. It was a combination of a regular yeshiva of the Ponevitch type and a yeshiva for baalei teshuva. The yeshiva accepted students who had almost no knowledge of Judaism.
