= Yeshivat Eretz HaTzvi =

Coordinates: 31°45′12.57″N 35°12′22.06″E

Location
- Ha-Va'ad ha-Le'umi St 21, Jerusalem; Israel

Information
- Type: Post-high-school Yeshiva
- Established: 2004
- Staff: 20
- Enrollment: 54
- Affiliation: Modern Orthodox Judaism
- Rosh Yeshiva: Rabbi Yehuda Susman
- Menahel: Rav Benny Pflanzer
- Website: www.eretzhatzvi.org

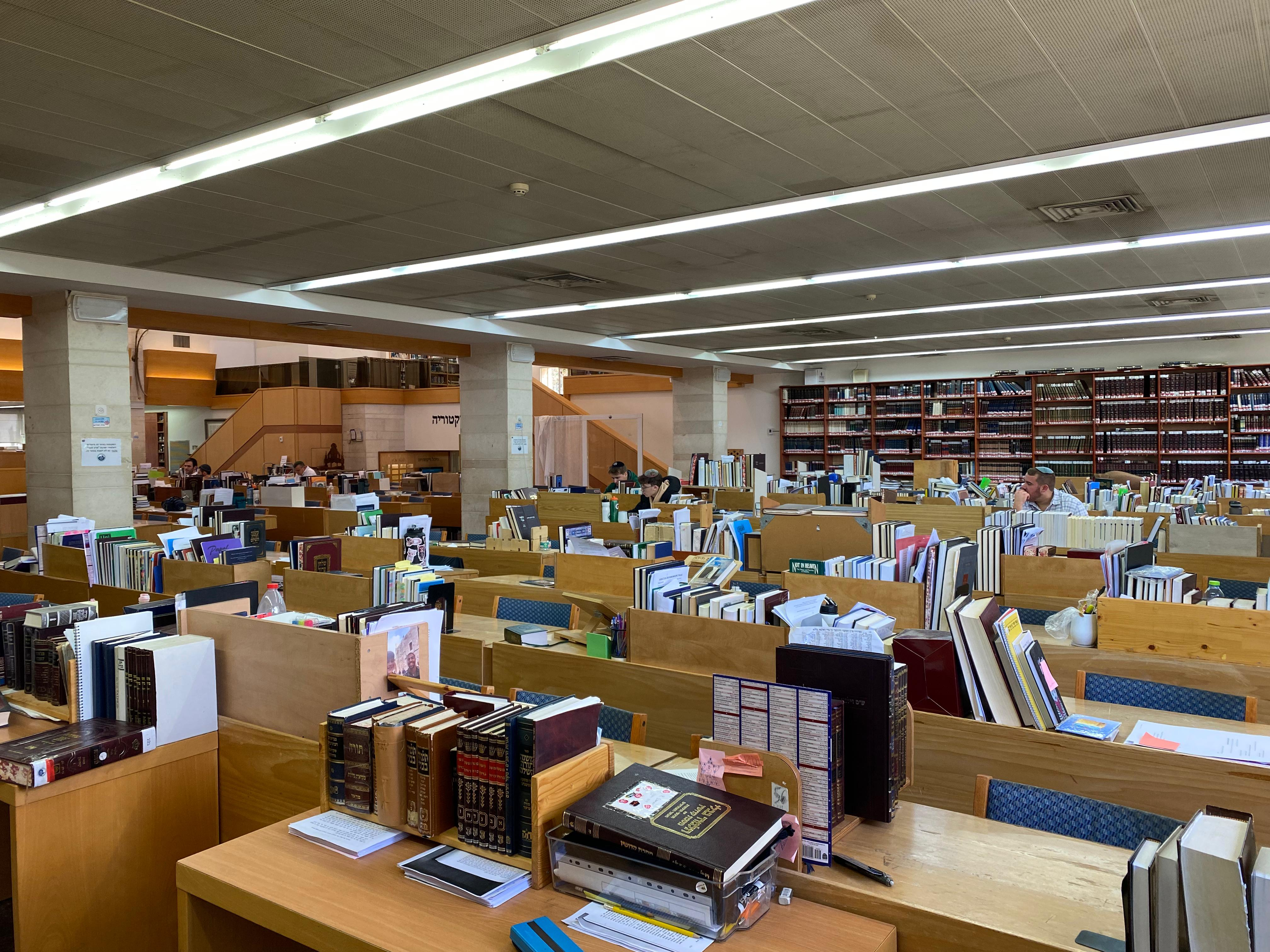
The Beit Midrash of Yeshivat Eretz Hatzvi, shared with Machon Lev (Jerusalem College of Technology)

Yeshivat Eretz Hatzvi (Hebrew: ישיבת ארץ הצבי) is a Modern Orthodox yeshiva, located in the Givat Mordechai neighborhood of Jerusalem on the Jerusalem College of Technology Campus, Israel. It was founded in 2004.

Rav Yehuda Susman serves as the Rosh Yeshiva. and Mashgiach ruchani emeritus. Rav Benny Pflanzer is the Menahel (Director) of the yeshiva. Rav Todd Berman is the associate director.

== Students ==
The student body is made up of students from all around the world. The yeshiva is composed of students from America, Canada, England, Australia, Israel, France, and South Africa. The yeshiva also generally has a high percentage of students from various European countries.

The Yeshiva is well known for having participants of Bnai Akiva's "Torani" program for British, European, and Canadian students, as well at their "Midreshet Torah V'Avoda (MTA)" program for southern hemisphere students

== Sedarim ==
Morning Seder

The student body is divided into a number of different shiurim (class-levels), based on level of proficiency. Each shiur has its own "Ram" (Rabbi). Additionally, Rabbi Simcha Krauss gave a shiur to the higher levels brought together once a week. Classes meet for one hour in the morning, followed by an hour and a half of group study to familiarize students with the sources, followed by another hour Shiur where the Ram goes over the sources in depth.

Afternoon Seder

The afternoon seder has its own set of "Ramim" (Rabbis). There are separate sets of Rabbis for Halacha, Tanakh and Machshava classes, although some of the Rabbis teach in multiple sedarim. Afternoon seder is split into two shiurim by a twenty-minute break. The two shiurim are selected from a number of options during a shopping period at the beginning of each semester.

Night Seder and Kollel

Part of night seder includes learning with an Israeli chavruta. Students are encouraged to spend the rest of night seder pursuing independent projects in Jewish study by themselves or with other students. The Israelis are members of a kollel who live and learn in Eretz HaTzvi, although they attend university during the day.

Davening

The yeshiva has its own davening in the morning (Shacharit) and evening (Maariv), and often joins Machon Lev for the afternoon service (Mincha).

== Yeshiva Traditions ==
Every spring, the school holds a week-long competition between the different shiurim in honor of Purim.

It is tradition for every student to give a brief talk to the entire student body once during the year. These talks are given twice a week, in the morning, so that each student should get a chance to speak at some point during the year.
