= Hesder Yeshiva of Sderot =

Yeshiva located in Sderot, Israel

The Hesder Yeshiva of Sderot, known formally as the Max and Ruth Schwartz Yeshivat Hesder of Sderot, was founded in 1995 by Rabbi Dovid E. Fendel. The yeshiva is located in the town of Sderot, one kilometer from the Gaza Strip and the Palestinian Arab town of Beit Hanoun. It is the largest Hesder Yeshiva in Israel, with a student body of over 800 students from communities all over the country. In addition to studying, students demonstrate their commitment to the residents of Sderot through many volunteer projects.

Since the beginning of the Second Intifada in October 2000, the city has been under regular rocket fire from Qassam rockets launched by Hamas and Islamic Jihad. This brought attention to the yeshiva, which was rebuilt in a series of rocket-proof buildings. Since 2007, the yeshiva has each year lit a Chanukah menorah made out of the spent shells of rockets fired at Sderot from Gaza.

== See also ==
- Hesder
