= Structure of the Israel Defense Forces =

Organization of Israeli armed services

Military of Israel
- Israel Defense Forces logo
- Service branches: Israeli Ground Forces; Israeli Air Force; Israeli Navy; Computer Service Directorate; Technological and Logistics Directorate; Military Intelligence Directorate

The structure of the Israel Defense Forces (IDF) differs from most armed forces in the world in several ways. These include the close integration of air, ground, and sea forces, and the conscription of women. Since its founding, the IDF has adapted to match Israel's unique security situation. The IDF is one of Israeli society's most prominent institutions, influencing the country's economy, culture and political scene. Following 1967, the Israel Army has had close military relations with the United States Army, including development and cooperation, such as on the F-15 jet, and the Arrow missile defense system.

== Armed Forces ==
=== Air Force ===
- Israeli Air Force
- Israeli Air Defense Command
- Shaldag Unit

=== Ground Forces ===
- GOC Army Headquarters
  - Israeli Ground Forces
    - Armored Corps (Israel)
    - Artillery Corps (Israel)
    - Combat Engineering Corps
    - Infantry Corps (Israel)
    - Combat Intelligence Corps

=== Naval Force ===
- Israeli Naval Academy
- Israeli Navy
- Shayetet 13

=== Computer Service ===
- C4I Corps

=== Technological and Logistics ===
- Medical Corps (Israel)
- Technology and Maintenance Corps
- Logistics Corps

=== Military Intelligence ===
- Military Intelligence Directorate

== Police Force ==
- Israel Police
- Israel Border Police
- Israel Prison Service
- Ministry of Public Security (Israel)
- Yamas (Israel Border Police unit)

== Military Industries ==
- Aeronautics Defense Systems
- Automotive Industries
- Elbit Systems
- Israel Aerospace Industries
- Israel Military Industries
- Israel Shipyards
- Israel Weapon Industries
- Rafael Advanced Defense Systems

== See also ==
- IDF military operations
