= Yeshivat Or Etzion =

Religious high school in Israel

Coordinates: 31°41′55″N 34°42′31″E

Yeshivat Or Etzion is a Hesder Yeshiva, religious high school, that enrolls about 200 students, some of whom may serve in the army. It is located in Merkaz Shapira, Israel. Its Rosh Yeshiva was Rabbi Chaim Meir Drukman. It was founded in late 1959 by the Shapir Regional Council to commemorate the memory of the sons of Gush Etzion and its 14 soldiers who fell in the War of Independence.

The "Yeshiva Gavoha" program has approximately 220 students. The Yeshiva Gavoha program follows the full Hesder military service framework, incorporating an additional year of yeshiva study prior to military service. This structure ensures that nearly all students serve in elite military units and often hold officer or leadership positions.

== Notable alumni ==
- Yohanan Danino
- Moshe Feiglin
- Yossi Cohen
- Avi Dabush
