= Yeshivat Nahariya =

Coordinates: 33°0′2.82″N 35°6′5.19″E

Yeshivat Hesder Nahariya
- Northern Israel; Nahariyya, Israel

Information
- Religious affiliation: Judaism
- Established: 1996

Yeshivat Hesder Nahariya (also known as Yeshivat Nahar Deiah, or Nahar Deiah Hesder Yeshiva in Nahariya) is a religious study institution located in the northernmost city in Israel, Nahariya, on the Mediterranean coast. It is a Hesder yeshiva, which combines religious Torah study with service in the army and community service. The Yeshivat Hesder Nahriya was founded in 1995 by the Chief Rabbi of Nahariya, Rabbi Yeshayahu Meitlis, after a rocket attack from Hezbollah. It opened with 15 students, by 2010 had more than 100 students and has a program for overseas students.

Students routinely volunteer in the community, at hospitals and shelters, supporting residents of Nahariya and the surrounding area with food and clothing. In 2001 the yeshiva founded a Relief Center and by 2010 it had evolved into the community organization, Bet Neriya, operating education programs and relief projects for the region.
