= Yeshivat Ohr David =

Jewish seminary and institute of higher learning

Coordinates: 31°49′16.4″N 35°11′43.69″E

Yeshivat Ohr David (or Yeshivat Or David, lit. Light of David Yeshiva) is a Jewish seminary and institute of higher learning located in Jerusalem.

Ohr David is currently located in Ramot. Throughout the year, students take trips throughout the Land of Israel, including trips to the Golan Heights and Eilat.

The head of the yeshiva is Rabbi Yosef Granofsky and was founded by Rabbi Chaim Flom in 1980.
