= Meir Harel Hesder Yeshiva =

Coordinates: 31.91417°N 34.99961°E

The Meir Harel Hesder Yeshiva, led by Rabbi Eliezer Chaim Shenvald, is a Hesder Yeshiva that works on the Shesder (Hebrew:שסדר) six-year program.

== History ==
The Meir Harel Hesder Yeshiva was established after Israel's unilateral disengagement plan in 2006 by rabbi Eliezer Chaim Shenwald, that came from the Hesder Yeshiva in the Golan Heights. The reason for establishing the Yeshiva is that the Israeli nation needs a different Yeshiva that would underline the values of social leadership, military leadership together with giving and caring for the city of Modi'in and the state of israel. In 2011 the Yeshiva has opened a Jewish library in memory of Avner Goldman z"l, an Israeli religious air force pilot who lived in Modi'in. Avner was killed during a training flight in Romania. His family donated the library.

In the end of 2013, the Yeshiva opened a branch in the city Ofakim, israel.

== The military service ==
The Yeshiva has two main programs. All programs start with a year and a half of studying in the yeshiva.

- the regular service

this program contains a 10-month service in IDF, 10 months of learning, another year of military service and ending with two years of learning.

- the commanders service

this program contains an 11-month service in IDF, 8 months of learning, a bit more than a year of military service and ending with to full years of learning. Most students that become commanders continue to be officers. They come back only in the last year and their second army period is two years. On 14.02.13, Orthodox Israeli website reported "Srugim" that more than 50% of soldiers that are part of the program led by the Yeshiva, are combat IDF commanders.

- Military paramedics program

In 2013, the Yeshiva, MDA and IDF, have conceived a program based on the military service program in the Yeshiva, allowing orthodox youth MDA volunteers to join the IDF through the Yeshiva and be trained as Military paramedics. The reason for this is the lack of IDF paramedics.

In total: both programs are six-year programs.

== The religious advantage ==
The learning time is extended and allows to grow religious scholars(Hebrew: תלמידי חכמים)

== The military advantage ==
The Military service is extended by half a year more than the usual Hesder program. students would not be asked to leave the program if they wish to become officers, as done in some Yeshivot.

== Shahak Lebnei Hamitzva and community relations ==
The Yeshiva's goal is to "educate its students to follow in the path of Harav Kook זצ"ל, to love the Torah, with a diligent devotion to deep Torah learning, Jewish Leadership, and love of the land and the nation."

The Yeshiva has a very tight relationship with the community of Modi'in, that is expressed by a variety of activities that are held by both Yeshiva and community.

One of the projects organized by the Yeshiva is called "Shahak Lebnei Hamitzva" in memory of Lt. Gen. Amnon Lipkin-Shahak, a partner in establishing the Yeshiva, addressed to young boys, at age 13 from the secular sector in Modi'in. The project, (that had been established while Lipkin-Shahak was alive, and was then simply called "Bar Mitzvah Project") includes increased preparation classes taught, along with group lessons on Jewish identity, Jewish values, Jewish history, and practical volunteer work. At the end, the students, along with their parents, tutors and instructors, go on a guided tour of the Jewish Quarter of Jerusalem. At the end of the tour there is a group Aliyah Latorah (a Jewish custom) (in addition to those in private) and a festival lunch in honor of the mitzvah. By 2013 there had been over a thousand trainees in the project.

== See also ==
- Hesder Yeshiva
