= Yeshivat HaHesder Yerucham =

Coordinates: 30°59′07″N 34°55′39″E

Yeshivat Hesder Yerucham (Hebrew: ישיבת הסדר ירוחם) is a hesder yeshiva located in the development town of Yeruham, Israel. It was founded in 1993 and currently there are over 220 students. It is known for its high level of Gemara learning.

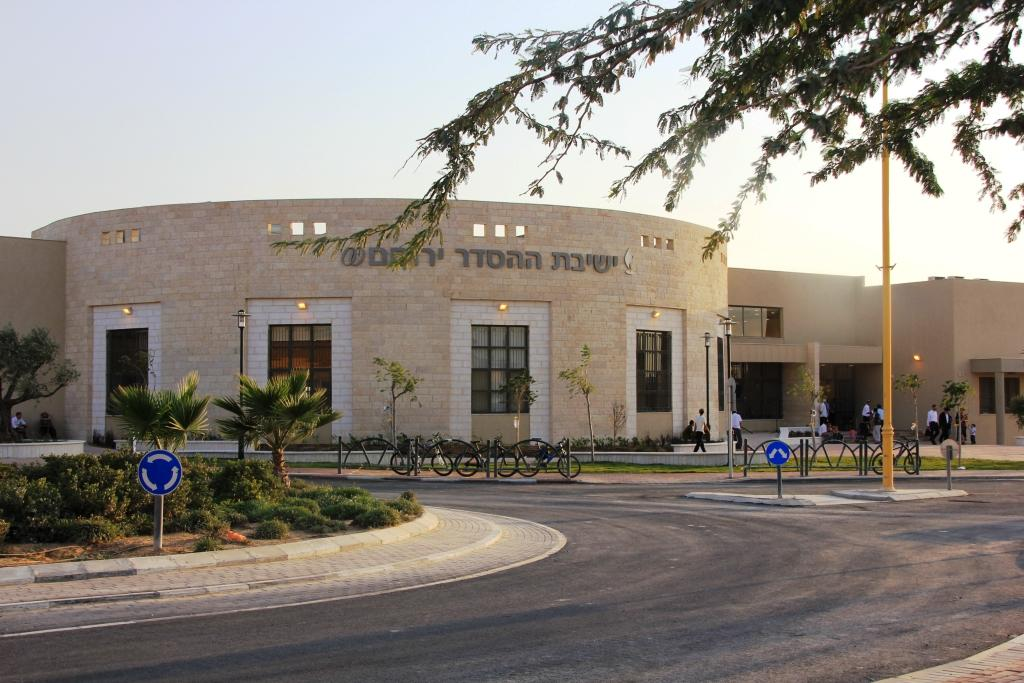
A picture of the outside of Yeshivat Hesder Yerucham.

== History ==
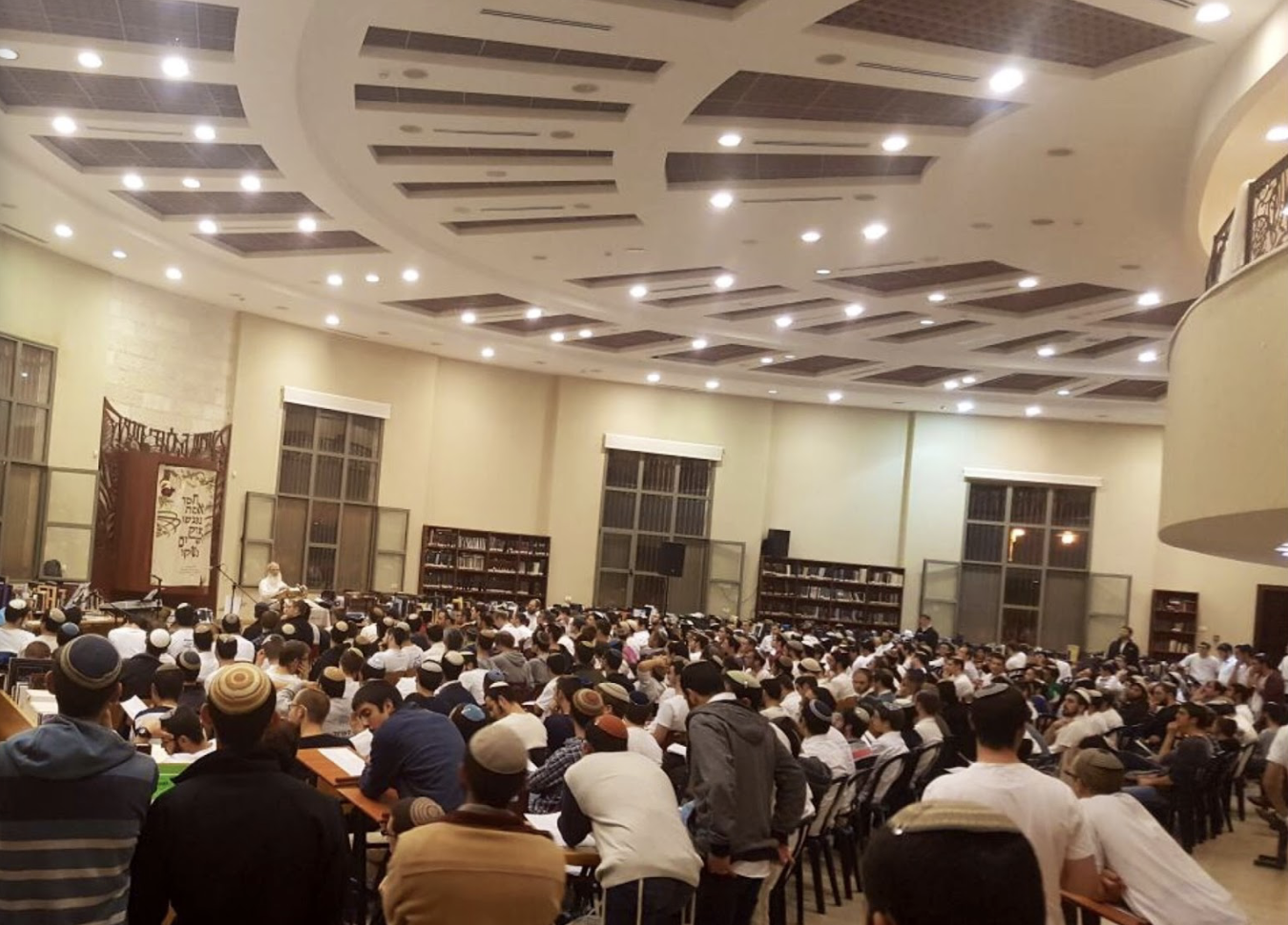
Inside the beis medresh of the yeshiva

In the early 1970s, a group of Religious Zionists settled in Yeruham with the goal of improving the south of Israel, and helping to increase the quality of life for the residents of Yerucham. Over time, the group grew in number and expanded its activities by taking on educational responsibilities as well. After establishing "Midreshet B'Yahad", a Seminar Center of Judaism, Society and Zionism Studies, the group realized the need for a yeshiva as the next step in strengthening the existing projects by bringing youth to Yeruham.

The leader of this group, Shmuel Friedman Ben-Shalom, approached Rabbi Eliyhau Blumenzweig, who at the time taught at Yeshivat Har Etzion, with a proposition to be the Rosh Yeshiva, which he accepted. The yeshiva subsequently opened its doors in 1993.

Today, the yeshiva is considered to be one of the most serious hesder yeshivas in the country.

During the Gaza war, ten of the yeshiva's graduates and current students were killed in the battles.

== Curriculum ==
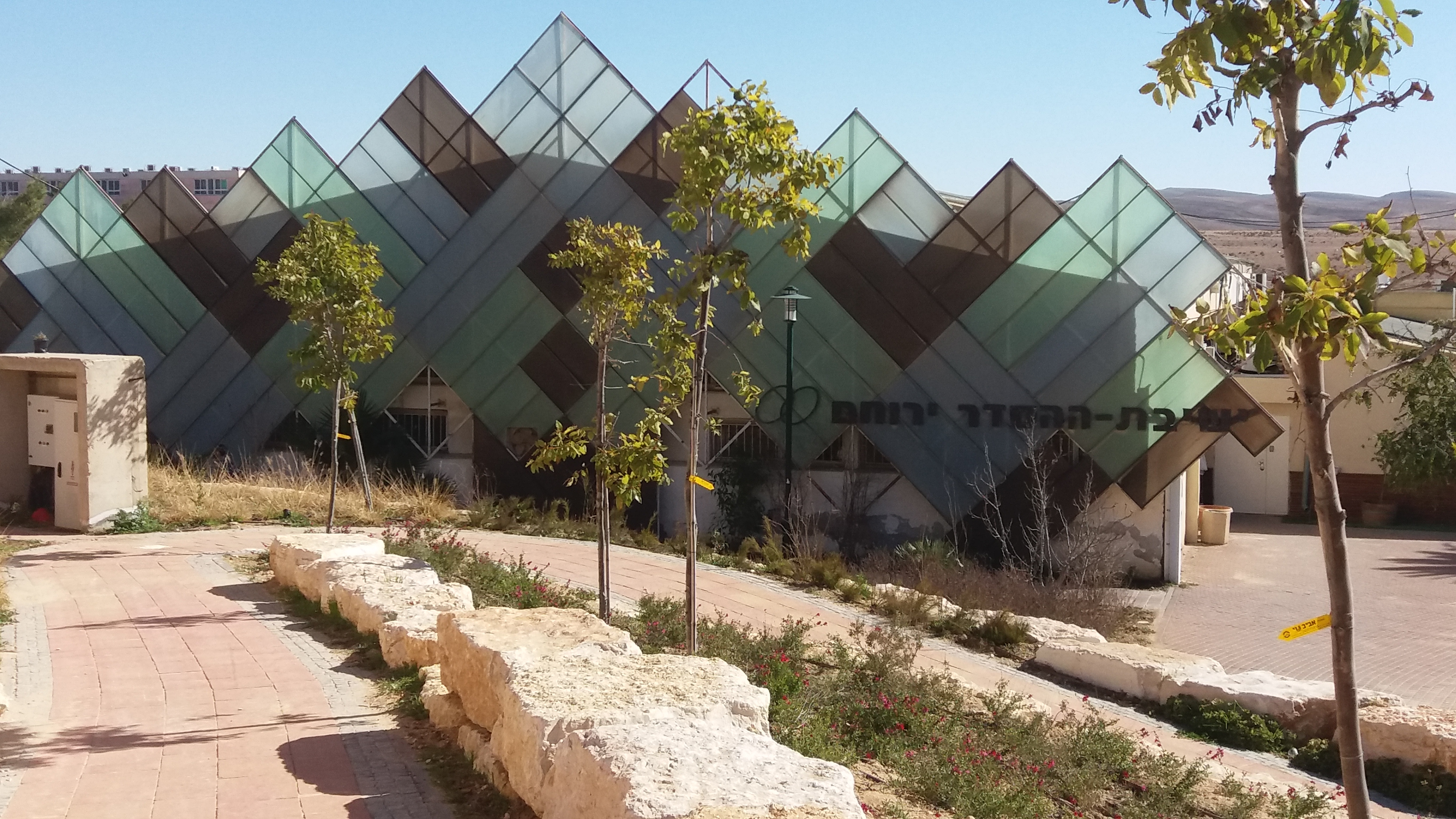
Lunch room of the Yeshiva

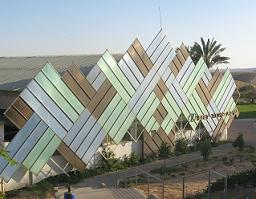
Lunch room of the Yeshiva

Daily Schedule:

Shachrit (and halachah seder): 6:30–8:00 am

Breakfast: 8:00–8:30 am

Morning seder: 8:30 am–1:00 pm

Lunch/break: 1:00–3:00 pm

Mincha: 3:00–3:20 pm

Afternoon seder: 3:20–7:30 pm

Supper: 7:30–8:00 pm

Marriv: 8:00–8:30 pm

Night seder: 8:30–11:00 pm (or later)

Yeshivat Hesder Yerucham emphasizes the importance of learning Talmud in depth, specifically through the Brisker Method. A typical day in Yeshiva will include two sessions of intensive Talmud study (iyun) and one of extensive study (bekiut).

In terms of the afternoon seder, students can either learn with a charvuras, go to shiurim, or a combination of both. The yeshiva offers weekly classes in Tanakh, Jewish philosophy, Hasidic philosophy and the works of Jewish scholars such as Maimonides, Rabbi Yehuda Halevi, the Maharal of Prague, Moshe Chaim Luzzatto, Joseph B. Soloveitchik, Abraham Isaac Kook, and many others.

The daily schedule is: shacharit at 6:30 am, followed by a halachah seder until 8:00 am. Breakfast is from 8:00–8:30 am. After breakfast is morning seder, which is typically gemara iyun, and it goes from 8:30 am – 1:00 pm. Following the morning seder is lunch and a break from 1:00–3:00 pm. Mincha is at 3:00 pm, followed by the afternoon seder, from about 3:20–7:30 pm. Afternoon seder consists of more iyun gemara, followed by a couple hours of emunah. Many of the students use the entire afternoon seder for learning machshava, tanach, mussar, and emunah. From 7:30–8:00 pm is Maariv, followed by supper from 8:00–8:30 pm. Night seder consists of learning bekiut, and it goes from 8:30 pm until at least 11:00 pm, although there is no given time for night seder to end, and many students learn until later.

The daily schedule goes from Sunday to Thursday, and there is a morning shiurim given on Fridays as well. On motza'ei shabbos there is night seder, and on Thursday night many students do "mishmor" and learn until very late hours of the night.

== Educational approach ==
The gemara shiurim at the yeshiva are given at a very high level, and usually go into great depth on a certain topic in the gemara. The works of the Rishonim and Acharonim are often analyzed in the shiurim. The rosh yeshiva gives a "shiur klali" for the entire yeshiva during Thursday's morning seder.

The yeshiva guides its students to base their perspective upon the teachings of Rabbi Yehuda Halevi and the Maharal of Prague in accordance with the ideology of Abraham Isaac Kook, as is often customary in Religious Zionist yeshivas. With the goal of educating students to deal independently with the challenges they face living as observant Jews in a modern world, the yeshiva encourages a broader study of biblical, rabbinic, and other classical and modern works.

The yeshiva educates its students to be aware of their surroundings and attentive to the needs of society in general. The yeshiva believes that the keys to solving Israel's socioeconomic gaps lie in integration and education. All the students volunteer in the community mainly in the field of education. Many of the yeshiva's alumni settle in Yeruham instead of heading to the country's central cities.

The yeshiva also promotes other programs, among them:

- Ye'adim (goals) - Concern of the Ethiopian Jewry in Israel's situation led Yerucham students to create a leadership training program for Ethiopian students with the intention of their returning to their communities. During the 5 years of Hesder the students synchronize their full Yeshiva studies with a B.Ed. degree in Herzog College.
- Young Study Partners - First and second year students dedicate 2 hours weekly to studying Torah subjects with children from the local elementary school. They also serve as positive role models for the local youth and look to form a connection with their families.
- Charity Fund - The goal of the Fund is to help the needy of Yeruham become self-sufficient and better managers of their money. The Fund uses the cooperation of the local welfare and professional financial advisors to this end.
- B'levav Shalem Yeshiva High School – Because of the lack of high quality religious high schools in the Negev, and as a part of the integration program the Hesder Yeshiva believes in, it was decided by alumni, residents of Yerucham, to open a Yeshiva High School for the local and general population.

== Educational staff ==
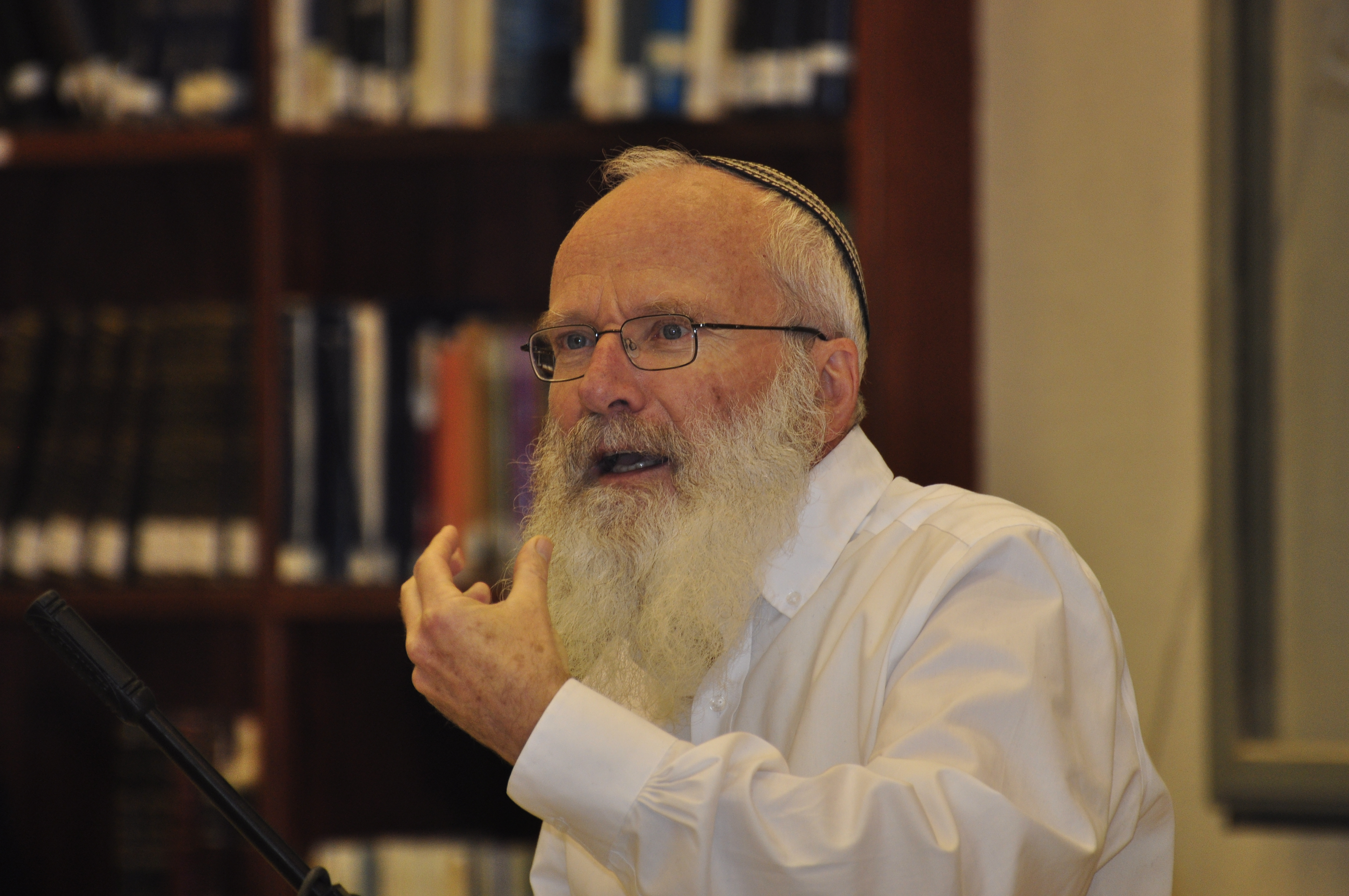
Rabbi Blumenzweig

The original Rosh Yeshiva was Rabbi Eliyahu Blumenzweig. In 2018, Rabbi Blumenzweig retired, and Rabbi Uriel Eitam and Rabbi Chaim Wolfson were appointed to be the new roshei yeshiva.

== Yeshiva's publications ==
Here are some of the publications from the yeshiva's collective student body that have come out over the past number of years:

- Kutanot Or (Coats of Light) - "A Jewish Perspective on the meaning of modesty and its value", collection of essays edited by Yeshiva's students.
- Mimidbar Matana (A Present From The Desert) - A monthly newsletter which is sent out to students in the IDF and alumni.
- Meisharim (Righteous) - A journal of articles on a variety of Torah topics, written by the students and teachers, published annually by the Yeshiva.
- Hahazit ShebaOref (The Home-Front Front) - A collection of essays dealing with the trials and challenges of a non-combat soldier. The book's intention is to answer some of the questions that soldiers serving in non-field units, such as the importance of their service, and halakhic perspective on different situations.

Many of the rabbis that teach in the yeshiva have also published a number of sefarim.

== See also ==
- Hesder
- Yeshiva
- Yerucham
- Torah
- Israel
- Gemara
- Brisker method
