= Torat Eretz Yisrael =

Hebrew expression

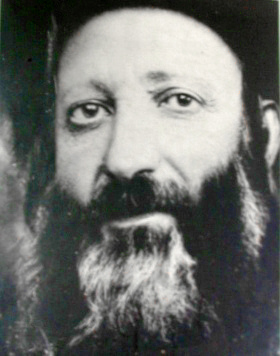
Avraham Issac Kook

The Hebrew expression Torat Eretz Yisrael (literally "Teachings concerning the Land of Israel") refers to the idea that Torah thoughts emanating from the land of Israel are of great religious status. In the Midrash Genesis Rabbah it is stated: “there is no Torah like the Torah of the Land of Israel, and there is no wisdom like the wisdom of the Land of Israel." Another midrash in the Sifre indicates that there is a unique flavor to the land of Israel because the Torah is located in it.

The term “Torat Eretz Yisrael” has lately become associated with religious writings on the Land of Israel ("Eretz Yisrael"), in particular those conforming to a religious-Zionist point of view. Such teachings achieve prominence in the works of Rabbi Avraham Yitzchak Kook, the first religious-Zionist Chief Rabbi of the modern-day State of Israel. Today, for example, these continue in the works and teachings of Rabbi David Bar-Hayim, David Samson and Rabbanit Shani Taragin amongst others.
