= Breuer =

Breuer is a surname. Notable people with the surname include:

- Amit Breuer, Canadian-Israeli documentary filmmaker
- Annabel Breuer (born 1992), German wheelchair fencer and wheelchair basketball player
- Bessie Breuer (1893–1975), American journalist and author
- Beverley Breuer, American actress
- Carolyn Breuer (born 1969), German musician
- David Breuer-Weil (born 1965), English artist
- Eric Breuer, Swiss archaeologist and historian
- Grit Breuer (born 1972), German sprinter
- Hans Breuer (physicist) (1933–2020), German physicist
- Hans Breuer (politician), German politician
- Isaac Breuer (1883–1946), German rabbi
- Jacob Breuer (1916–2008), Israeli lawyer
- Jacques Breuer (born 1956), Austrian actor
- Jean Breuer (1938–2025), German cyclist
- Jean Breuer (cyclist, born 1919) (1919–1986), Belgian cyclist
- Jim Breuer (born 1967), American comedian
- Josef Breuer (1842–1925), Austrian physician and physiologist
- Joseph Breuer (1882–1980), Hungarian-born German and American rabbi
- Lanny A. Breuer (born 1958), American lawyer
- Lee Breuer (1937–2021), American playwright and theatre director
- Lyn Breuer (born 1951), Australian politician
- Mala Breuer (1927–2017), American artist
- Marcel Breuer (1902–1981), Hungarian-born American architect and furniture designer
- Marco Breuer (born 1966), German photographer
- Marita Breuer (born 1953), German actress
- Marv Breuer (1914–1991), American baseball player
- Michel Breuer (born 1980), Dutch footballer
- Miles J. Breuer (1889–1945), science fiction writer and physician
- Mordechai Breuer (1921–2007), German-born Israeli Orthodox rabbi
- Mordechai Breuer (historian) (1918–2007), German-Jewish historian
- Paul Breuer (born 1950), German politician
- Peter Breuer (1856–1930), German sculptor
- Randy Breuer (born 1960), American basketball player
- Renate Breuer (born 1939), West German sprint canoeist
- Rolf-Ernst Breuer (1937–2024), German businessman and jurist
- Shayne Breuer (born 1972), Australian rules footballer
- Siegfried Breuer (1906–1954), Austrian actor
- Siegfried Breuer Jr. (1930–2004), Austrian actor
- Solomon Breuer (1850–1926), Hungarian-born German rabbi
- Theo Breuer (born 1956), German poet, essayist, editor, translator and publisher
- Theo Breuer (footballer) (1909–1980), German footballer
- Thomas C. Breuer (born 1952), German writer and cabaret artist
- William Breuer (1922–2010), American military historian
- Ursula Merkin (1919–2006), German-born American philanthropist, born Ursula Breuer

== See also ==
- Beurer, German manufacturer
- Brewer (surname)
- Meike Breuer, fictional character in the German soap opera Verbotene Liebe
- Met Breuer, defunct museum in New York City
- Khal Adath Jeshurun, Orthodox German Jewish Ashkenazi congregation in New York City, colloquially known as Breuer's
