= Merkin (disambiguation) =

A merkin is a pubic wig.

Merkin may also refer to:

== People ==
- Hermann Merkin (1907–1999), American-Jewish businessman and philanthropist
- Ursula Merkin (1919–2006), German-born, American-Jewish author and philanthropist
- Richard Merkin (1938–2009), American painter and illustrator
- Marvin Merkins, pseudonym for Jacques Scandelari (1943–1999), French film director, screenwriter and producer
- Daphne Merkin (born 1954), American novelist and cultural critic
- J. Ezra Merkin (born 1954), American money manager, financier and philanthropist
- Michele Merkin (born 1975), American model and television host
- Merkin Valdez (born 1981), Dominican Major League Baseball player

== Entertainment ==
- Merkin Muffley, a character in the British-American film Dr. Strangelove
- Merkin, Mother of Spiders, a character in the comic The Sandman
- A character in the cartoon Yogi Bear and the Magical Flight of the Spruce Goose

== Other uses ==
- An internet slang for inhabitants of the United States
- Merkin Concert Hall, Manhattan, New York City
- Merkin Ball, a two-song single by the American alternative rock band Pearl Jam

== See also ==
- Mirkin, a surname
