= Breuer's Yeshiva =

Breuer's Yeshiva may refer to:

- Torah Lehranstalt, yeshiva of the Breuer family in Germany
- Yeshiva Rabbi Samson Raphael Hirsch, yeshiva of Rabbi Joseph Breuer in New York

== See also ==
- Khal Adath Jeshurun
