= Torah Umadda =

Worldview concerning the relationship between the secular world and Judaism

Torah Umadda (/tɔːrɑ umɑdɑ/; Hebrew: תּוֹרָה וּמַדָּע, "Torah and knowledge") is a worldview in Orthodox Judaism concerning the relationship between the secular world and Judaism, and in particular between secular knowledge and Jewish religious knowledge. The resultant mode of Orthodox Judaism is referred to as Centrist Orthodoxy.

== History ==
Torah Umadda is closely associated with Yeshiva University. The actual philosophy underlying the combination of Torah and secular wisdom at Yeshiva University was variously articulated, first by Bernard Revel, by his successors Samuel Belkin and Joseph Soloveitchik, and most recently, and formally, by Norman Lamm. Although its roots go back to 1886, it was only in 1946 that the University adopted "Torah Umadda" as its slogan. (In 2005, Yeshiva University president Richard Joel initiated a campaign to append the phrase "Bringing wisdom to life", as a "tag-line" to the university's motto.) Today, Yeshiva University publishes the Torah Umadda Journal which "explores the complex relationships between Torah, the humanities, and the natural and social sciences", as well as studies on related topics in the Library of Jewish Law and Ethics (with Ktav Publishing House).

The phrase itself is thought to originate with Jonathan Eybeschutz, who mentions "Torah u-Madda" in his Yaarot Devash in at least sixteen places. This use of "Madda" as "secular knowledge" is, however, recent. In Rabbinic literature, "secular knowledge" is usually referred to as chokhmah חכמה. The first book in Maimonides' compendium of Halakha, the Mishneh Torah, is entitled "Madda" מדע - there, though, the term refers to knowledge of the fundamentals of Judaism. "In the first book I will include all the commandments that are principles of the law of Moses and that a man should know before all else, such as the Unity of God and the prohibitions related to idolatry. And I have called this book Sefer ha Madda the Book of Knowledge."

Torah and Madda is also compared to the doctrine of the Vilna Gaon as stated in Sefer Kol Hator, that the torah is incomplete without knowledge of the 7 wisdoms.

== Philosophy ==
=== Torah and secular knowledge ===
In the view of Torah Umadda, "Jewishness and Jewish faith ... and the universal concerns and preoccupations of humanity" are not "fundamentally inapposite"; Judaism and culture are, "in essence part of one continuum". Jewish knowledge and secular knowledge, Torah and Madda, do not, therefore, require "substantive reconciliation"; in fact, the study of Torah with other knowledge results in a heightened and enriched Judaism. As articulated by Rabbi Norman Lamm:

"Torah, faith, religious learning on one side and Madda, science, worldly knowledge on the other, together offer us a more over-arching and truer vision than either one set alone. Each set gives one view of the Creator as well as of His creation, and the other a different perspective that may not agree at all with the first ... Each alone is true, but only partially true; both together present the possibility of a larger truth."

=== Synthesis ===
Although Torah Umadda regards science and religion as separate, where the "wisdom of the world" maintains its own significance, it nevertheless conceives of a synthesis between the two realms. In this understanding, "synthesis does not refer to a logical unity of the theories of science, democracy and Judaism"; rather, the idea of synthesis has a psychological and a sociological meaning. Here, the "individual has absorbed the attitudes characteristic of science, democracy and Jewish life and responds appropriately in diverse relations and contexts."

We prefer to look upon science and religion as separate domains which need not be in serious conflict and, therefore, need no reconciliation. If we seek the blending of science and religion and the integration of secular knowledge with sacred wisdom, then it is not in the subject matter of these fields but rather within the personality of the individual that we hope to achieve the synthesis.

Given this conception, the realization of Torah Umadda may find "different legitimate expressions in each individual." In his book Lamm explores six separate models of Torah Umadda, including those presented by Maimonides, Samson Raphael Hirsch, and Abraham Isaac Kook. The philosophy recognizes the challenge this is likely to pose to its adherents, and posits a framework in which "the confrontation between Judaism and secular culture results in heightened creativity within Judaism."

=== Centrality of Torah ===
Despite its acceptance of both Torah and secular knowledge and culture, Torah Umadda prioritizes a Torah outlook and Torah knowledge, and in its practice requires strict adherence to Halakha (Jewish law). Torah Umadda demands "unquestioned allegiance to the primacy of Torah, and that the apprehension of all other intellectual disciplines must be rooted and viewed through the prism of Torah."

In the words of Rabbi Lamm, "Torah Umadda does not imply ... coequality. Torah remains the unchallenged and preeminent center." It is noted that "Torah Umadda can only be viable if it imposes strict limits on freedom of thought in areas that may challenge fundamental Jewish beliefs." However, as regards observance of Jewish law, "Not a single fundamental of Judaism has been disturbed by us, we adhere to the same ikkarim (principles of faith), we are loyal to the same Torah, we strive for the same study of Torah and observance of mitzvot that our parents and grandparents before us cherished throughout the generations."

=== Other paradigms ===
Another model of Torah Umadda, less emphasized in Modern Orthodox literature, de-stresses the intellectual role of Madda. Rather, to some degree, "the theories and methods of secular disciplines [can] be used to secure not intellectual ends, but practical ends in [daily life]." God's blessing to Adam and Eve "Fill the land and conquer it" (Genesis 1:28) is interpreted by Rav Soloveitchik (as well as Samson Raphael Hirsch and Isaac Breuer) as a positive mitzvah calling man to develop and improve God's world; this mitzvah of creative activity expresses the divine image in all branches of human culture. Thus, secular knowledge enables the religious Jew "to fulfill the biblical mandate of "Fill the land and conquer it" ... to carry out their responsibilities to others and, further, by increasing the modalities for improving human welfare, to expand the range of these responsibilities; and, finally, to fulfill the mandate of imitatio Dei." See further under Joseph B. Soloveitchik § Torah U'Chochma synthesis and Divine providence in Judaism § Modern Orthodox Judaism.

== Centrist Orthodoxy ==
Centrist Orthodoxy is the dominant mode of Modern Orthodox Judaism in the United States and the western world; it is also influential in the Modern Orthodox movement in Israel.

=== Characteristics ===
Centrist Orthodoxy's weltanschauung (Hashkafa) is characterised by "education, moderation, and the centrality of the people of Israel." In general, differences between Centrist Orthodoxy and other Orthodox movements (both Haredi and Modern - e.g. Open Orthodoxy) result from the particular emphasis placed on each of these characteristics; see further discussion under Modern Orthodox Judaism.

==== Education ====
Madda entails "worldly involvement" in addition to its intellectual component - and places a high value on contribution to general society. Adherents of Centrist Orthodoxy are thus well represented, proportionately, in the professions and in academia - and to some extent in politics. Rav Hershel Schachter has said in interviews that "Dr. Shmuel Belkin, a past president of Yeshiva University, said that Torah Umadah is “a yeshiva with a cafeteria & a dormitory in one building.” You need a degree to make a parnassah. Dr. Belkin said that we give everything in one building, so you don’t have to travel to a city college. That’s what Torah Umadda is all about." Members of Haredi communities, by contrast, will typically not undertake any post high school secular education (except for specific exceptions for livelihood purposes), and will, in general, minimize involvement with the secular.

==== Moderation ====
For Centrist Orthodoxy, moderation "is the result neither of guile nor of indifference nor of prudence, it is a matter of sacred principle ... it is not the mindless application of the arithmetic mean... [rather] it is the earnest sober and intelligent assessment of each situation... [Thus], moderation issues from a broad weltanschauung rather than from tunnel vision." This moderation, "seeking what is allowed rather than forbidden", is manifest in three ways. Firstly, along with the Haredi community, the ideology demands adherence to the halakha; however it is not insistent that strictures (chumras) are normative, rather, these are a matter of personal choice (see 3.1 and 4.1 under Modern Orthodox Judaism). Secondly, relative to the Haredi community - but less so than in non-orthodox communities - women are starting to play a public role within the community (in roles other than strictly religious). Thirdly, the movement will engage with the broader Jewish community, as discussed below, and with the secular world, as opposed to the Haredi approach of minimizing such contact.

==== Centrality of the People of Israel ====
All Orthodox ideologies place a high value on ahavat yisrael (love of ones fellow Jews) and all regard the Land of Israel as holy - and residence there as a mitzvah. However, for Centrist Orthodoxy, the "People of Israel", additionally, play a central role. The resulting difference, relative to other philosophies, manifests in two ways. Firstly, involvement with non-orthodox will extend beyond "outreach" - in which many Haredi organisations engage - to continued institutional relations and cooperation (despite the "deviationist violations of Torah and Halakha" of the non-orthodox). Secondly, Centrist Orthodoxy places a high national, as well as religious, significance on the State of Israel. Centrist Orthodox institutions and individuals are therefore Zionist in orientation, and rates of Aliyah (immigration to Israel) from this community are high relative to others; study in Israeli Hesder Yeshivot is also common. Thus, although Centrist Orthodoxy and Religious Zionism are not identical, they share many of the same values and many of the same adherents.

=== Institutions ===
The institutions of American Centrist Orthodoxy include:

- Yeshiva University and The Rabbi Isaac Elchanan Theological Seminary ("RIETS"), the main institution for the training and ordination of Orthodox congregational Rabbis in America. See also Yeshiva § United States.
- The Rabbinical Council of America, the central body of Centrist Rabbis. Its "Beth Din of America", long headed by Rabbi Soloveitchik, is a respected source of Jewish legal decisions.
- The Orthodox Union ("OU"; Union of Orthodox Jewish Congregations of America) established in 1898, is largest union of American Orthodox congregations. Its activities include the administration and certification of kashrut; support for a broad range of religious educational institutions and projects; lobbying the American government on various issues of importance to religious Jews (and occasionally, on matters related to Israel). It also incorporates NCSY (National Conference of Synagogue Youth) which offers social, educational and outreach programming in hundreds of communities.
- Young Israel (The National Council of Young Israel) founded in 1912, serves as the national coordinating agency for nearly 150 Orthodox congregations; the goal of NCYI is "to broaden the appeal of the traditional community synagogue as the central address for Jewish communal life by providing educational, religious, social, spiritual and communal programming".

== Relationship with Torah im Derech Eretz ==
See also under Azriel Hildesheimer, Modern Orthodox Judaism and below.

Torah im Derech Eretz—"Torah with worldly involvement"—is a philosophy of Orthodox Judaism concerning the relationship between Torah Judaism and the modern world, first articulated by Samson Raphael Hirsch in c. 1840. In some senses Torah Umadda and Torah im Derech Eretz are similar. Both value the acquisition of secular knowledge coupled with adherence to halakha; both, additionally, emphasise worldly involvement. In fact, Torah im Derech Eretz is sometimes put forward as one paradigm upon which Torah Umadda (and Modern Orthodoxy in general) is based.

At the same time though, the two are distinct in terms of emphasis. Whereas Torah Umadda maintains two separate realms—religious and secular—and accents the idea of (psychological and sociological) synthesis, "Rabbi Hirsch's fight was not for balance and not for reconcilement, nor for synthesis and certainly not for parallel power, but for domination—for the true and absolute domination of the divine precept over the new tendencies" (Isaac Breuer, Hirsch's grandson).

Another difference is that Torah Umadda does not disavow communal partnership with the non-Orthodox Jewish community, whereas for Rabbi Hirsch "Austritt" (the Halachic requirement to have no official ties with non-Orthodox communal institutions) was a defining characteristic of his community, and a major theme in his writings.

While these distinctions can seem subtle (particularly the first), they have manifested in markedly divergent religious attitudes and perspectives. In fact, Shimon Schwab, leader of the "Breuers" community in Washington Heights, has been described as "spiritually very distant" from Torah Umaddah.

Note further, that given both of the above, some have proposed that today, followers of Torah Umadda in fact assume a "non-Hirschian position", resembling more closely that of Rabbi Azriel Hildesheimer.

== Criticism ==
=== Haredi Judaism ===
Critics of Torah Umadda, particularly within Haredi Judaism, see the complementarity of Torah and secular knowledge proposed by the philosophy as suggesting that the Torah is not of itself whole or complete. In their view, Torah Umadda is thus premised on a flawed appreciation of Torah. Furthermore, they believe that Torah Umadda is problematic in that its synthesis allows for an "encroachment" of the scientific worldview on Jewish theology. Torah Umadda thus represents a dilution of the "pure sanctity" (taharat hakodesh) of the Torah.

=== Hasidic Judaism ===
Criticism by Hasidic groups includes an additional Kabbalistic dimension. Here, since the doctrine of Tzimtzum is understood to imply that since the physical world in fact conceals the existence and nature of the creator, study of the natural world will be unlikely to deepen one's appreciation of God or understanding of Torah (see Tzimtzum § Inherent paradox; also, Judah Loew ben Bezalel § Jewish philosophy). A further consideration - in common with the Haredi view - arises in that the role of the Jew in this world is understood, primarily, to be concerned with fulfillment of the Law and study of Torah: "[One should] live by the light of these three things: love of God, love of Israel, and love of Torah" (Baal Shem Tov). Thus, the study of secular ideas and devotion of time to secular activities not directly for the sake of Torah - or as is necessary for supporting oneself - may constitute "spiritually damaging behavior". The sciences in particular are considered problematic:

"Occupying oneself with the sciences… is… included in the category of engaging in inconsequential matters insofar as the sin of neglecting the Torah is concerned… Moreover, the impurity of science is greater than the impurity of idle speech… Thus this is forbidden unless one employs [this knowledge] as a useful instrument, viz., as a means of [earning a livelihood] with which to be able to serve God… or unless he knows how to apply them in the service of God or to his better understanding of His Torah [i.e., in the manner of] Maimonides and Nachmanides…" (Tanya: Likutei Amarim, 8)

— Shneur Zalman of Liadi

"The main cause of the weakening of faith in our sages, is the attribution of [value] to secular knowledge... whereas, being based on philosophy or on the study of nature, as opposed to that which is true and eternal, this knowledge is in fact spiritually valueless ... further, pursuit of this knowledge is often motivated by physicality..." (Etzot Yesharot: Moadim) "...It is [thus] a major prohibition to study "investigative" works – particularly since several difficulties relating to [His essence] are impossible to address naturally (see re. Tzimtzum, above)…. [Thus] scholars of nature (i.e. scientists) who wish to demonstrate that everything is explicable through nature… in fact “prey” on many of us… and it is therefore forbidden to review their books…" (Likutei Etzot: Hakirot)

— Nachman of Breslov

=== Neo-Orthodoxy ===
As above, critics within Neo-Orthodoxy, the movement directly descended from Hirsch's Frankfurt community, claim that the equality between Torah and secular posited by Torah Umadda in fact results in a diminution in the status of Torah - and a misrepresentation of the teachings of Rabbi Hirsch: "even to suggest that anything can be parallel to Torah is a blasphemy of the highest order". The distinction between the two approaches, though subtle, manifests in markedly divergent religious attitudes and perspectives; as above, Shimon Schwab, second Rabbi of this community in the United States, is described as being "spiritually very distant" from Yeshiva University. See also under Torah im Derech Eretz § Interpretation where Hirsch's commentary on Deuteronomy 6:7 is quoted; here, echoing the above Hasidic critiques, he explicitly cautions that "We are not to study Torah from the standpoint of another science or for the sake of that science."

=== Religious Zionism ===
The philosophies of Torah Umadda and Religious Zionism are not in any direct conflict, and generally coexist sharing both values and adherents. However, more conservative Religious Zionists differ with Torah Umadda in its approach to secular knowledge. In this view, engagement with secular ideas and situations is permissible and encouraged, but only insofar as this benefits the State of Israel. Here, then, secular knowledge is viewed as valuable for practical ends, though not in and of itself. Thus, for example, in contrast to Torah Umadda, the study of literature and the humanities is discouraged here, whereas the study of engineering or medicine (and with subsequent practice in Israel) is deemed to be valuable.

=== Modern Orthodoxy ===
Within the Torah Umadda camp itself, there are those who question whether "the literature on Torah u-Madda with its intellectually elitist bias fails to directly address the majority of its practitioners"; further, there are suggestions that "the very logic of the practice is far removed from the ideology" ("The community works with an ideology of Torah combined with a suburban logic of practice"). The contention here is that the "Torah u-Madda suburbanite" does not in reality engage in secular studies in order to achieve the intellectual synthesis described above, but rather "view[s] a college degree as the gateway toward professional advancement." Thus, although Torah Umadda may allow students at Yeshiva University "to navigate the use of their college years", it may not provide a directly applicable theology for the contemporary Modern Orthodox family. See also Modern Orthodox Judaism § Sociological and philosophical dilemmas.

In The Crisis of Zionism, Peter Beinart writes that while the motto of Yeshiva University is Torah Umaddah, many Modern Orthodox leaders have abandoned that intellectual openness "in favor of an insularity that bespeaks both fear and insularity: fear that Orthodox Judaism cannot survive a dialogue with the outside world and arrogance that the outside world can add nothing of value to the world of Torah."

== See also ==
- Bar-Ilan University – a Tel Aviv based university which aims "to blend tradition with modern technologies and scholarship, and teach the compelling ethics of Jewish heritage to all."
- Hebrew Theological College - a Chicago based institution, "preparing its graduates for roles as educators and Rabbis", while providing "broad cultural perspectives and a strong foundation in the Liberal Arts and Sciences."
- Islamization of knowledge
- Jerusalem College of Technology - a Jerusalem based college, founded to "educate students who see the synthesis of Jewish values and a profession as their way of life"
- Jonathan Sacks § Torah v'Chokhma
- Kabbalistic approaches to the sciences and humanities
- Lander College - a New York City based college, combining Torah study with secular, University study, based on a philosophy of Torah Uparnassa (Torah and Livelihood)
- The Zomet Institute - a crossroad between Halacha and the modern world

== Resources ==
Torah u'Maddah Journal

- Articles by topic
- Articles by author

The Library of Jewish Law and Ethics

- Halakhah and Politics: The Jewish Idea of the State, ISBN 0-88125-129-1
- Economics and Jewish Law, ISBN 0-88125-106-2
- Economic Public Policy and Jewish Law, ISBN 0-88125-437-1
- Jewish Woman in Jewish Law, ISBN 0-87068-329-2
- Business Ethics: A Jewish Perspective, ISBN 0-88125-582-3
- Case Studies in Jewish Business Ethics, ISBN 0-88125-664-1
- Free Enterprise and Jewish Law: Aspects of Jewish Business Ethics, ISBN 0-87068-702-6
- Equity in Jewish Law: Halakhic Perspectives in Law : Formalism and Flexibility in Jewish Civil Law, ISBN 0-88125-131-3
- Equity in Jewish Law: Beyond Equity : Halakhic Aspirationism in Jewish Civil Law, ISBN 0-88125-326-X
- Morality, Halakha and the Jewish Tradition, ISBN 0-87068-727-1
- Jewish Ethics and Halakhah for Our Time: Sources and Commentary, ISBN 0-88125-044-9
- Contemporary Halakhic Problems (5 vols), ISBN 0-87068-450-7, ISBN 0-88125-474-6, ISBN 0-88125-315-4, ISBN 0-87068-275-X, ISBN 1-56871-353-3
- Judaism and Psychology: Halakhic Perspectives, ISBN 0-87068-703-4
- Holocaust and Halakhah, ISBN 0-87068-296-2
- Medicine in the Bible and the Talmud, ISBN 0-88125-506-8
