= Breuer's =

Breuer's may refer to:

- Khal Adath Jeshurun, Orthodox Jewish congregation in New York
- Yeshiva Rabbi Samson Raphael Hirsch, yeshiva in New York
- Torah Lehranstalt, yeshiva in Germany
