= Frankfurt Yeshiva =

Frankfurt Yeshiva may refer to:

- Torah Lehranstalt, yeshiva of the Breuer family before the Holocaust
- Yeshiva Gedolah Frankfurt, operating Chabad yeshiva
