= Bar-Or =

Bar-Or and Bar Or may refer to:

- Dorit Bar Or (born 1975), Israeli actress
- Nimrod Shapira Bar-Or (born 1989), Israeli swimmer
- Oded Bar-Or (1937–2005), Israeli physiologist
- Yaakov Bar-Or, born Jacob Breuer, was an assistant prosecutor at the trial of Trial of Adolf Eichmann in 1961.

== See also ==
- Ben-Or
