= Missing years (Jewish calendar) =

Date discrepancy in the Hebrew calendar

The missing years in the Hebrew calendar refer to a chronological discrepancy between the rabbinic dating for the destruction of the First Temple in 422 BCE (3338 Anno Mundi) and the academic dating of it in 587 BCE. In a larger sense, it also refers to the discrepancy between conventional chronology versus that of Seder Olam in what concerns the Persian period during which time it exercised hegemony over Israel, a period which spanned 207 years according to conventional chronology, but only 34 years according to Seder Olam. Invariably, the resulting timeframe also affects the number of years the Second Temple stood, said by a late rabbinic tradition to have stood 420 years, but by conventional chronology 589 years.

== Dating in academic sources ==
The academic datings in question are confirmed by a variety of Persian, Babylonian and Greek sources, which include records of datable astronomical observations such as eclipses, although there are disagreements among modern scholars, ranging from 1 to 2 years, over some of the dates in the conventional chronology.

=== Siege of Jerusalem (597 BC) ===
Both the Babylonian Chronicles and the Bible indicate that Nebuchadnezzar captured Jerusalem. The Babylonian Chronicles (as published by Donald Wiseman in 1956) establish that Nebuchadnezzar captured Jerusalem the first time on 2 Adar (16 March) 597 BCE. Before Wiseman's publication, E. R. Thiele had determined from the biblical texts that Nebuchadnezzar's initial capture of Jerusalem occurred in the spring of 597 BCE, while other scholars, including William F. Albright, more frequently dated the event to 598 BCE.

=== Second siege and destruction of the First Temple ===
According to the Bible, Nebuchadnezzar installed Zedekiah as king after his first siege, and Zedekiah ruled for 11 years before the second siege resulted in the end of his kingdom.

Although there is no dispute that Jerusalem fell the second time in the summer month of Tammuz, Albright dates the end of Zedekiah's reign (and the fall of Jerusalem) to 587 BCE, whereas Thiele offers 586 BCE. Thiele's reckoning is based on the presentation of Zedekiah's reign on an accession basis, which was used for most but not all of the kings of Judah. In that case, the year that Zedekiah came to the throne would be his first partial year; his first full year would be 597/596 BCE, and his eleventh year, the year Jerusalem fell, would be 587/586 BCE. Since Judah's regnal years were counted from Tishrei in autumn, this would place the end of his reign and the capture of Jerusalem in the summer of 586 BCE.

== Dating in traditional Jewish sources ==
A variety of rabbinic sources state that the Second Temple stood for 420 years. In traditional Jewish calculations, based on Seder Olam Rabbah, the destruction of the Second Temple fell in the year 68 of the Common Era, implying that it was built in about 352 BCE. Adding 70 years between the destruction of the First Temple and the construction of the Second Temple, it follows that the First Temple was destroyed in around 422 BCE. While acceptance of this chronology was widespread among ancient rabbis, it was not universal: Pirkei deRabbi Eliezer, Midrash Lekach Tov, and numerous rishonim disagree with the chronology of Seder Olam Rabbah.

The traditional Jewish date recognized by the rabbis as the "year of destruction" is approximately 165 years later than the accepted year of 587 or 586 BCE. This discrepancy is referred to as the "missing years".

=== Details of rabbinic chronology ===
According to the Talmud and Seder Olam Rabbah, the Second Temple stood for 420 years, with the years divided up as follows:

103 years (35 BCE – 68 CE) = Herodian dynasty
103 years (138–35 BCE) = Hasmonean dynasty
180 years (318–138 BCE) = Seleucid Empire
34 years (352–318 BCE) = Achaemenid Empire rule while the Second Temple stood (not including additional years of Persian rule before the Temple's construction).

The date of 318 BCE for the Greek conquest of Persia is evident from the Talmud, which implies that that Greek rule began six years before the beginning of the Seleucid era (which occurred in 312/11 BCE). In academic chronology, Alexander conquered the Achaemenids between 334–330 BCE.

Seventy years passed between the destruction of the First Temple and the building of the Second Temple in the seventy-first year, according to 2 Chronicles 36:21, so construction of the Second Temple in 352 BCE implies that the First Temple was destroyed in 423 BCE.

Similarly, the Megillat Antiochus implies that the Second Temple was built in 352 BCE, and thus that the First Temple was destroyed in 423 BCE.

The figure of 420 years is likely derived from the Prophecy of Seventy Weeks in Daniel 9:24–27. The rabbis interpreted this passage as referring to a period of 490 years which would pass between the destructions of the First and Second Temples—70 years between the Temples, plus 420 years of the Second Temple, starting in the 71st year after the destruction, though the passage can plausibly be interpreted in other ways.

== Proposed explanations ==
If traditional dates are assumed to be based on the standard Hebrew calendar, then the differing traditional and modern academic dating of events cannot both be correct. Attempts to reconcile the two systems must show one or both to have errors.

=== Missing years in Jewish tradition ===
Scholars see the discrepancy between the traditional and academic date of the destruction of the First Temple arising as a result of Jewish sages miscounting the reign lengths of several Persian kings during the Persian Empire's rule over Israel. Modern scholars tally 14 Persian kings whose combined reigns total 207 years. By contrast, ancient Jewish sages only mention four Persian kings totaling 52 years. The reigns of several Persian kings appear to be missing from the traditional calculations.

Certain verses in the Bible itself suggest a longer Persian era, such as Nehemiah 12:10–22 where six generations of priests are listed in the Persian period. However, as the Bible does not mention any significant events occurring in those additional years, the later rabbis may have consciously chosen to omit the years from their chronology.

Azariah dei Rossi (1511 - 1578 CE) was likely the first Jewish authority to claim that the traditional Hebrew dating is not historically precise regarding the years before the Second Temple, and suggests that the Sages of Israel may have chosen to include in their chronology only those years of the period of Persian dominion that were clearly expressed or implied in the Bible. Additional time, the length of which was not clearly stated, was chosen to be ignored. Nachman Krochmal agreed with dei Rossi, pointing to the Greek name Antigonos mentioned in Pirkei Avot 1:3 as proof that there must have been a longer period to account for this sign of Hellenic influence. Dei Rossi and Krochmal argued that when the length of a historical period was unknown, Seder Olam Rabbah took the method of assuming the shortest possible length.

Astrologer and chronicler, Raḥamim Sar-Shalom, following the view of dei Rossi, suggests that the purpose of the author of Seder Olam was only to state the number of years of the Persian period that were included in the Bible, and that a lack of understanding of the purpose by the Amoraim is what caused them, among other things, to calculate the date from creation erroneously. The "missing years" not only offset the span of the Persian period, but also offset the number of years collected since the first man, Adam, walked the face of the earth.

Solomon Judah Loeb Rapoport noted that the traditional Jewish chronology, when combined with another rabbinic tradition, places the Exodus from Egypt at exactly 1000 years prior to the Seleucid era (known in Jewish sources as "Minyan Shtarot"). He suggests that the authors of the traditional Jewish chronology intentionally omitted years from the Persian period to obtain the round number with the intent of allowing Jews who had counted years from the Exodus to easily switch to the Seleucid era system, used by Greek rulers at the time.

David Zvi Hoffmann points out that the Mishnah in Avot (1:4) in describing the chain of tradition uses the plural "accepted from them" even though the previous Mishnah mentions only one person. He posits that there must have been another Mishnah mentioning two sages that was later removed.

Shimon Schwab interpreted the Biblical words "seal the words and close the book" (Daniel 12:4) as a commandment to obscure the Biblical chronology so that it would not be possible to accurately calculate the time of the Messiah's arrival. Thus, according to Schwab, the traditional Jewish calendar intentionally omitted years from the Persian period. However, Schwab later withdrew that suggestion for numerous reasons.

A 2006 article in Ḥakirah journal suggested that the sages were concerned with the acceptance of the Mishnah. There existed a rabbinical tradition that the year 4000 marked the close of the "era of Torah". Thus, it is proposed, the sages arranged the chronology so that the redaction of the Mishnah should coincide with that date and thus have a better chance of acceptance.

Mordechai Breuer suggested that like other works of midrash, the tradition chronology in Seder Olam Rabbah was never meant to be taken literally but rather was intended to be symbolic.

Some Jewish thinkers, including Isaac Abarbanel, Chaim Hirschensohn and Adin Steinsaltz, have argued that the original Jewish chronology agreed with the academic chronology, but later misunderstandings or textual corruptions of Seder Olam Rabbah gave the impression that it refers to a shorter period of time. However, Seder Olam Rabbah's chronology is implicit in many different passages, and it is difficult to plausibly explain all of the passages in a way that agrees with the academic chronology.

Seder Olam versus Conventional chronology
Successive Chaldean rulers	Conventional chronology	Seder Olam's chronology
Nebuchadnezzar	43 years	45 years (Note: According to one Jewish tradition, the seventy-year period of exile commences with the beginning of Nebuchadnezzar's reign, and concludes with the rise of Cyrus the Great who ordered the rebuilding of Jerusalem.)
Amel-Marduk	2 years	23 years
Where conventional chronology goes on to cite another 3 successive Chaldean kings (spanning a period of nearly 22 years), Talmudic chronology cites only one Chaldean king that reigned after Amel-Marduk, namely, Baltasar (co-regent with Nabonidus), and who is said by the Talmudic record to have reigned a mere 3 years.		
Neriglissar	4 years	---
Labosordacus	9 months	---
Nabonidus (Baltasar) (Note: Others see Baltasar as Nabonidus' son and co-regent)	[Nabonidus] 17 years (Note: The scholars who deciphered The Babylonian Chronicles (inscribed on tablets) and who analyzed the delineation of years inscribed therein have put the fall of Babylon, in the 17th-year of Nabonidus, in 539 BCE.)	[Baltasar] 3 years (Note: In the Talmud, the name Nabonidus is not mentioned, whereas the presumed succession went from Nebuchadnezzar to his son Amel-Marduk, and from Amel-Marduk to his son Baltasar. Although the full regnal years of the man are not mentioned in the Hebrew Bible, there is, however, a reference in Daniel 8:1 alluding to Baltasar's 3rd-year of reign, including a reference to Baltasar's death in Daniel 5:30–31. According to Rabbeinu Chananel on BT Megillah 11b, the seventy-year period spoken of by Jeremiah (25:11–12; 29:10) and by Daniel (9:1–2) refers to the period of time from the destruction of Jerusalem in the days of Nebuchadnezzar to the 2nd-year of the reign of Darius the Great, the same year being the 3rd and final year of Baltasar's reign.)
Total number of years:	67 years	71 years

Successive Persian rulers	Conventional chronology	Seder Olam's chronology
Herodotus notes in his Histories that Cyrus the Great reigned 29 years. However, from Cyrus' taking of Babylon in the 17th year of the reign of Nabonidus, only 9 years remained of Cyrus' 29-year reign. This view is corroborated by Ptolemy's Canon. The nine years of Cyrus' reign as mentioned by him only reflect the number of regnal years remaining after Cyrus the Great conquered Babylon in 539 BCE. Cyrus is thought to have died in 530 BCE.		
Cyrus the Great	29 years (Note: In Parker's and Dubberstein's Babylonian Chronology, 626 B.C.–A.D. 75, p. 14, Cyrus' reign takes up where Nabonidus' reign ends. The nine years given for Cyrus only reflect the number of regnal years remaining after Cyrus the Great conquered Babylon in 539 BCE, bringing an end to Nabonidus' seventeen-year reign. Cyrus is thought to have died in 530 BCE.)	3 years (Note: The only reference in the Hebrew Bible mentioning the regnal years of Cyrus the Great is found in Daniel 10:1, viz., "In the third year of Cyrus king of Persia, etc." There is no indication as to how long he reigned.)
Cambyses (Note: In the Talmud (Megillah 11b), Cambyses is not mentioned, but is replaced by Ahasuerus who is thought to have succeeded Cyrus the Great)	[Cambyses] 7 years and 5 months (Note: Historians differ as to the number of his regnal years. Manetho puts down for this king that he reigned 5 years over his own kingdom in Persia, but 6 years over Egypt. Ptolemy's Canon writes that he reigned 8 years.)	[Ahasuerus] 14 years (Note: The regnal years for this king (14 years according to the Talmud), are not stated explicitly in the Hebrew Bible, and are thought to have only been inferred by the occurrence of four explicit timeframes mentioned in the Scroll of Esther and one that is inexplicit: the first being that Ahasuerus threw a large banqueting feast for his grandees and governors that lasted 180 days during the 3rd year of his reign [Esther 1:3]; the second being that he chose Esther (Hadassah) for his consort during the 7th year of his reign [Esther 2:16]; and the third being that during the 12th year of his reign [Esther 3:7], Haman desired to exterminate the entire Jewish nation and had contrived to commence the killing on a given day of a given month in the following year. On the following year [Esther 9:1], being now the 13th year of Ahasuerus, these orders were rescinded by the king's directives and the Jews found respite. Mordechai is said to have prospered from that time forward, while he and Esther sent out instructions on how the people of Israel were to observe the Purim festival: an allusion to the 14th year.)
The Magi	7 months	---
Darius, the son of Hystaspes	36 years	2 years (Note: These two years are only mentioned by the Talmud (Megillah 11b) so as to mark the conclusion of the 70-year period of Jerusalem's destruction, when Darius, during his 2nd-year of reign, laid the foundation for the Second Temple's rebuilding. It does not imply the complete regnal years of Darius' reign.) [36 years] (Note: According to the Talmud (Megillah 11b), this Darius is thought to have been the son of Ahasuerus, based on a verse in Daniel 9:1. Seder Olam erroneously places this Darius as a contemporary with Alexander the Great, and the last of the Persian kings. In conventional chronology, Darius the Great was not the son of Ahasuerus, but rather the son of Hystaspes, and is said to have reigned 36 years, and was succeeded by his son Xerxes. However, in Seder Olam's chronology, Darius is mentioned only with respect to his 2nd-year of reign when he laid the foundation of the Second Temple (356 BCE), a crucial point of reference considering that it is thought to have marked the end of the seventy-year period of Jerusalem's destruction. According to Ezra 6:15, Darius went on to fully complete the Temple in the 6th-year of his reign (352 BCE), but since the entire period of Persian hegemony over Israel during the time of the Second Temple was thought by Seder Olam to have been a mere 34 years (from 352 BCE to 318 BCE), this would imply that Grecian (Macedonian) hegemony over Israel began in 318 BCE, at the conclusion of Darius the Great's reign, or else at the beginning Xerxes' reign, when the Persian army was defeated by Alexander the Great. Modern scholarship has obviated the clear discrepancy in Seder Olam's chronology by saying that Tannaic scholars confounded Darius the Great with Darius III, and which caused the rabbis to omit ten other successive kings after Darius the Great.)
Xerxes (Artaxerxes), the Great, b. Darius (Note: According to Josephus (Antiquities 11.5.1-5), Ezra ascends to the Land of Israel, in 7th year of his reign.)	21 years	---
Artabanus	7 months	---
Artaxerxes (Cyrus) b. Xerxes the Great (Ahasuerus) (Note: By some accounts, he is said to have also borne the name Ahasuerus, a contemporary of Esther and Mordecai.)	41 years	---
Xerxes	2 months	---
Sogdianus	7 months	---
Darius, the son of Xerxes	19 years	---
Artaxerxes II Mnemon (Note: According to Isaac Abarbanel, this ruler is the same as Ahasuerus (אחשורוש), who reigned in the days of Esther and Mordecai. According to Abarbanel, some say that he reigned 14 years, while others say that he reigned 40 years.)	46 years	---
Artaxerxes III Ochus	21 years	---
Artaxerxes IV Arses	2 years	---
Darius III Codomannus	4 years	---
Total number of years:	228 years + 4 mo. (Note: Years may vary depending on source used. Most authorities hold that the Persian period in the Land of Israel commenced in the year 539 BCE, and ended in 332 BCE, with Alexander the Great's victory over the Persians. Mitchell First, who puts the Persian period at 207 years, reckons these years from when Cyrus first took Babylon in 539 BCE, rather than from Cyrus' first year of reign.)	53 years

Other advocates of alternative chronology will sometimes invoke the rabbinic tradition. David Rohl's New Chronology redates much of Egyptian history and he claims that his chronology matches the events of Exodus and other parts of the Bible better, as an example.

== See also ==
- Traditional Jewish chronology
