= Torah im Derech Eretz =

Torah with "the way of the land"

Torah im Derech Eretz (Hebrew: תורה עם דרך ארץ – Torah with "the way of the land") is a phrase common in Rabbinic literature referring to various aspects of one's interaction with the wider world. The term also refers to a philosophy of Orthodox Judaism articulated by Rabbi Samson Raphael Hirsch (1808–1888), which formalizes a relationship between traditionally observant Judaism and the modern world. The resultant mode of Orthodox Judaism is sometimes termed Neo-Orthodoxy or, in some historiographies, Frankfurter Orthodoxy.

== Derech Eretz ==
The term Derech Eretz, literally "the way of the land", is inherently ambiguous, with a wide range of meanings in Rabbinic literature, referring to earning a livelihood and behaving appropriately, among others.

The phrase Torah im Derech Eretz is first found in the Mishna in Tractate Avoth (2:2): "Beautiful is the study of Torah with Derech Eretz, as involvement with both makes one forget sin".

== Rabbi S.R. Hirsch ==
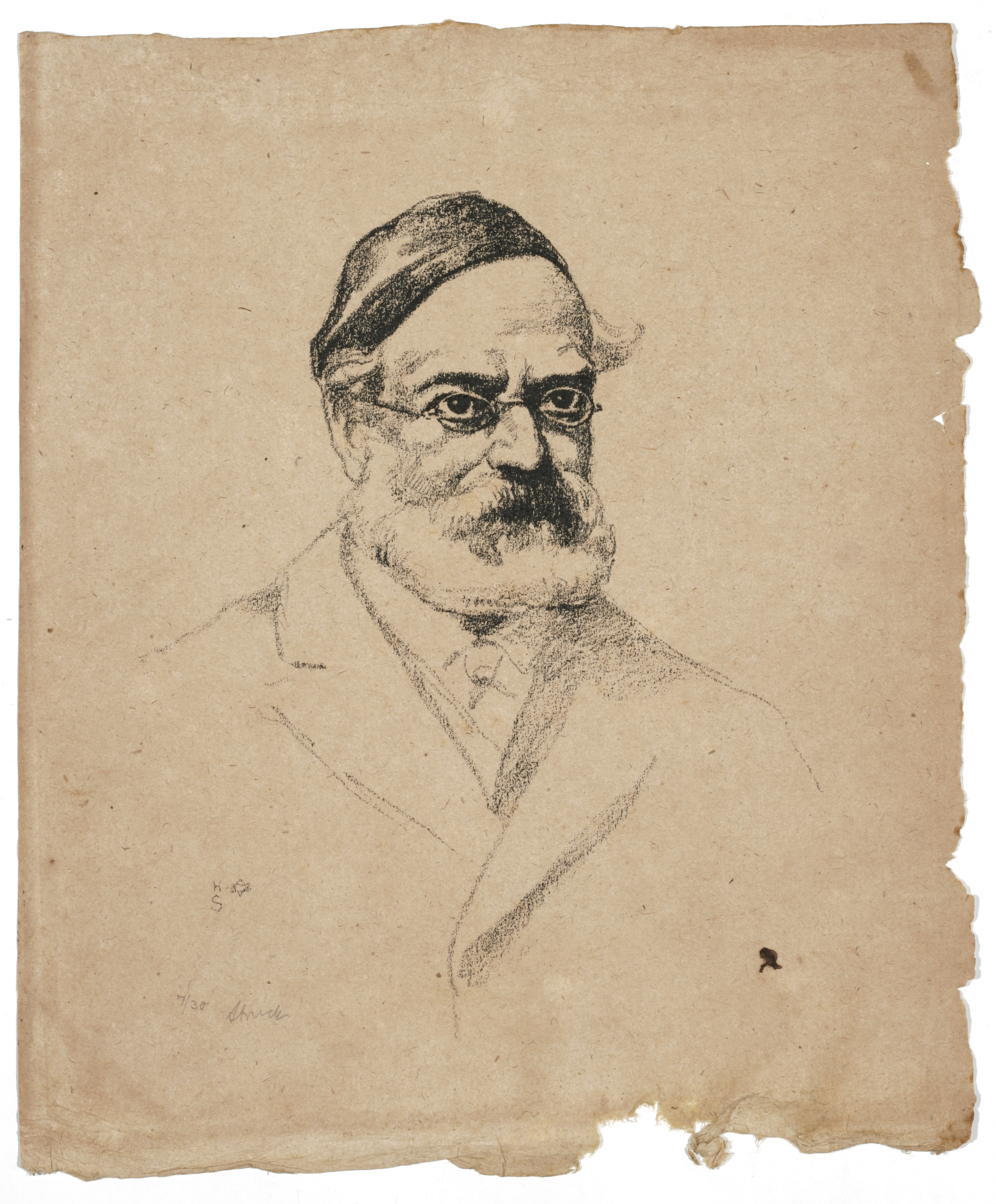
Samson Raphael Hirsch.

When Hirsch first came to Frankfurt in 1851, he proclaimed Torah im Derech Eretz as the "banner" for his congregation, the Israelitische Religionsgesellschaft — the phrase has since been synonymous with Hirsch as well as with his philosophy. As seen, Hirsch was not unique in extending Derech Eretz to include broad knowledge of the secular world; rather, his role was to formalize a philosophy of Derech Eretz that incorporated a practical response to modernity. Hirsch's philosophy has been variously interpreted within Orthodoxy.

=== Hirsch's Torah im Derech Eretz ===
In Hirsch's view, Derech Eretz refers not only to livelihood, but also to the social order, with the associated mores and considerations of courtesy and propriety, as well as to general education. Hirsch thus developed the concept of Derech Eretz to embrace Western culture while maintaining strict adherence to Jewish law.

==== Worldly involvement ====
Cover of an 1899 edition of The Nineteen Letters of Ben Uziel, where Hirsch lays out his program of Torah im Derech Eretz.

Hirsch seeks to demonstrate in all his writings that the combination of Torah and Derech Eretz is not only possible but necessary if Judaism is to dominate not only the religious sphere of personal and communal life, but the secular, mundane sphere as well. To Hirsch, the fulfillment of Torah—Derech Eretz—therefore requires worldly involvement and general participation in society, as facilitated by the requisite knowledge.

"Judaism is not a mere adjunct to life: it comprises all of life. To be a Jew is not a mere part, it is the sum total of our task in life. To be a Jew in the synagogue and the kitchen, in the field and the warehouse, in the office and the pulpit ... with the needle and the graving-tool, with the pen and the chisel—that is what it means to be a Jew."

==== Secular culture and education ====
In Hirsch's view, Judaism must "include the conscientious promotion of education and culture". Hirsch speaks of the Mensch-Yisroel ("Israel-man"), the "enlightened religious personality" as an ideal: that is the Jew who is proudly Jewish, a believer in the eternal values of the Torah, but also possessing the ability to engage with and influence contemporary culture and knowledge.

"The more, indeed, Judaism comprises the whole of man and extends its declared mission to the salvation of the whole of mankind, the less it is possible to confine its outlook to the synagogue. [Thus] the more the Jew is a Jew, the more universalist will be his views and aspirations [and] the less aloof will he be from ... art or science, culture or education ... [and] the more joyfully will he applaud whenever he sees truth and justice and peace and the ennoblement of man."

==== Jewish law ====
Hirsch was emphatic that Derech Eretz in no sense allows for halakhic compromise. In his view, Judaism is "an untouchable sanctuary which must not be subjected to human judgment nor subordinated to human considerations" and "progress is valid only to the extent that it does not interfere with religion". He states that "the Jew will not want to accomplish anything that he cannot accomplish as a Jew. Any step which takes him away from Judaism is not for him a step forward, is not progress. He exercises this self-control without a pang, for he does not wish to accomplish his own will on earth but labours in the service of God." In The Nineteen Letters of Ben Uziel, Hirsch remarked that it would have been better for the Jews not to have been emancipated if the price they had to pay was assimilation. (See also, Modern Orthodox Judaism#Standards of observance.)

=== Interpretation ===
See also the discussion on this point, in the article on Rabbi Hirsch.

As mentioned, the philosophy of Torah im Derech Eretz has been variously interpreted within Orthodoxy. The range of interpretations arises particularly in light of the tension between Hirsch's insistence as to faithfulness to Jewish law and tradition, and the challenges posed to this by interaction with the secular world.

Under a "narrow interpretation", exposure to secular philosophy, music, art, literature, or ethics must be functional. Under a "median interpretation", this exposure is permissible, and even required, for the sake of the domination of Torah values over one's worldly matters. Under a "broad interpretation" this exposure is permissible, providing a complement to—and even a synthesis with—Torah.

Thus as regards involvement in the secular world, the "narrow interpretation" essentially restricts Derech Eretz to a gainful occupation; permissible knowledge would be limited to functional and occupation related knowledge, and (possibly) secular knowledge that enables one to better interpret and understand the Torah. The "median interpretation" encourages the study of secular knowledge, but only insofar as this permits application of a Torah outlook and philosophy to human knowledge and culture. The "broad interpretation" permits the general acquisition of secular culture and knowledge as valuable in its own right.

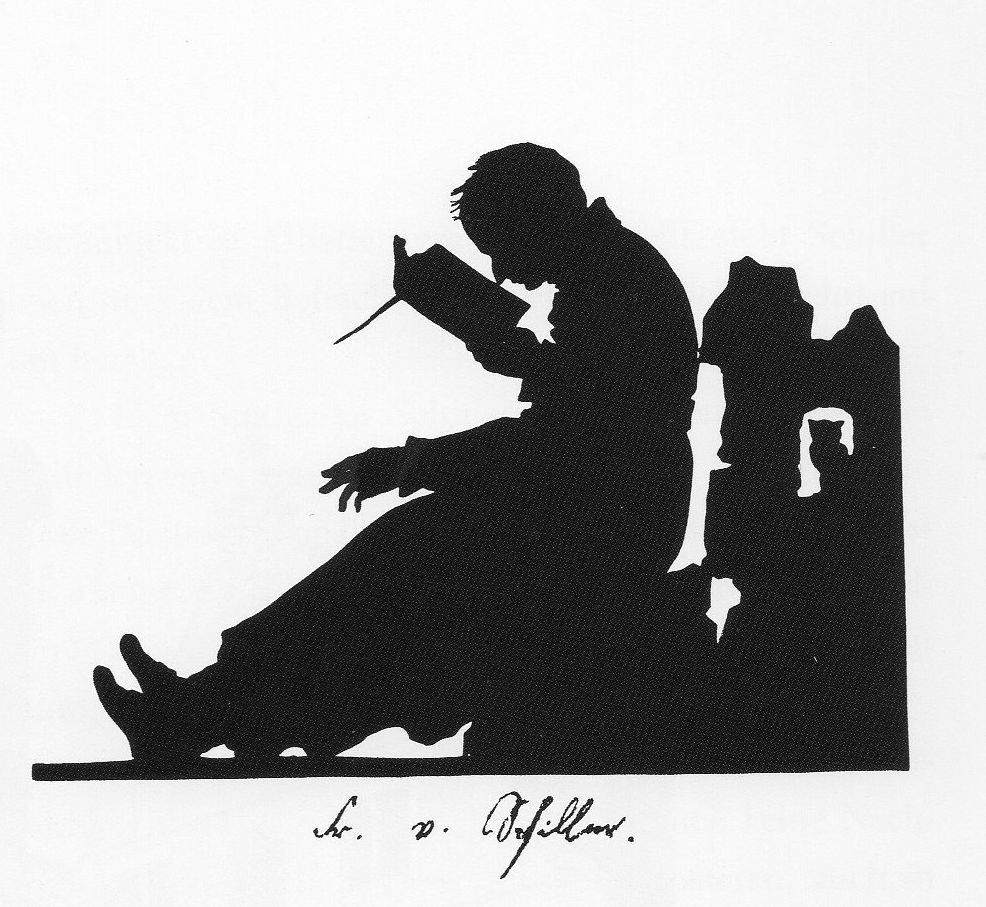
Interaction with modern culture is one aspect of Torah im Derech Eretz. Hirsch saw a common ground in values exposed by a philosopher like Schiller. The image, by Luise Duttenhofer (1776–1829), depicts Schiller reading.

Hirsch himself appears to have embraced the "median interpretation", albeit with the qualifications above. He states that "Torah im Derech Eretz, as used by our sages, means the realization of Torah in harmonious unity with all the conditions under which its laws will have to be observed amidst the developments of changing times" Thus on a regular basis, he quotes secular scientists in his Torah commentary. Some scholars believe that he was influenced by Hegel and Friedrich Schiller; in fact, in a speech given in the school he founded on the centenary of the birth of the latter, he claimed that the universalistic principles of Western culture embodied in Schiller's writings are Jewish values originating in the Torah.

On the other hand, Hirsch cautioned as to the danger of scientific knowledge leading one away from God; further, his schools, unlike others in Germany at the time, taught modern (business) languages as opposed to classical languages. Famously, in his commentary to Leviticus 18:4–5, Hirsch clearly delineates the relationship of secular knowledge and Torah, where Torah is "ikkar" (עיקר), the essential, while secular knowledge is "tefel" (טפל), secondary or supplementary to Torah. He states that "[w]e are confident that there is only one truth, and only one body of knowledge that can serve as the standard. ... Compared to it, all the other sciences are valid only provisionally".

His commentary on Deuteronomy 6:7 is perhaps more explicit:

"The study of the Torah shall be our main intellectual pursuit. ... We are not to study Torah from the standpoint of another science or for the sake of that science. So, too, we are to be careful not to introduce into the sphere of the Torah foreign ideas. ... Rather, we should always be mindful of the superiority of the Torah, which differs from all other scientific knowledge through its Divine origin. ... [Our Sages] do not demand of us to completely ignore all the scientific knowledge ... [but rather] that a person [be] familiar with these other realms of knowledge, but ... only from the Torah's perspective ... and they warn us that neglecting this perspective will jeopardize our intellectual life."

=== Neo-Orthodoxy: the "Breuer" communities ===
In 1851, Hirsch was called to become the rabbi of the breakaway Orthodox community of Frankfurt am Main. This community soon became the model for "modern communities" strict in adherence to Orthodox practices, sometimes called, "Frankfurter Orthodoxy". Hirsch's son-in-law Rabbi Dr. Shlomo Zalman (Solomon) Breuer, succeeded him after his death. Wary of establishing a dynasty, the Frankfurt community did not appoint Hirsch's son to be his successor.

After World War I, in order to show their rejection of religious liberalism, followers of the community started to call themselves "Neo-Orthodox"; this mirrored the parallel movement in Lutheranism (called "Neo-Orthodoxy"). Thus, at this point, Hirsch's romantic liberalism and the values of the 1848 struggle for civil rights were less relevant – and the rejection of many elements of Weimar German culture was prevalent. Solomon Breuer and Isaac Breuer were leaders of this conservative turn by the community.

Following Kristallnacht, Breuer and his family emigrated to Antwerp, and then to New York City. Once in New York, Breuer started a congregation among the numerous German refugees in Washington Heights, which closely followed the customs and mores of the Frankfurt community. The congregation, Khal Adath Yeshurun, is colloquially known as "Breuer's". Rabbi Shimon Schwab, also a native of Frankfurt, served as the second Rabbi of the "Breuer" community, until his death in 1995. Solomon Breuer and Joseph Breuer are often regarded as Hirsch's intellectual heirs, while Schwab is regarded as aligned with the more traditional Lithuanian orthodox communities.

The Breuer community has cautiously applied Torah im Derech Eretz to American life, narrowing its application over time. Schwab warned of the dangers of contemporary moral attitudes in secular culture and literature, and emphasized that followers of Neo-Orthodoxy therefore require a strong basis of faith and knowledge, and must exercise caution in engagements with the secular world.

Schwab also frequently emphasized that Torah can never be regarded as parallel with the secular knowledge. "Torah study is the highest duty of the Jew", and "even to suggest that anything can be parallel to Torah is a blasphemy of the highest order; Torah is above all, and everything else in life must be conducted in accordance with the Written and Oral Torah." Still, entry into commerce or the professions is seen as a valid component of Torah life, to be facilitated by an appropriate secular education (with the caveat that campus life is "incontestably immoral"). "Carrying on one's professional life in consonance with the halakha is in itself a practice of Torah." One must "establish the Torah's primacy over the modes of business and professional life so that his behavior transforms even that 'mundane' portion of his life into a sanctification."

The community is positioned ideologically outside of both Modern Orthodoxy and Haredi Judaism ("Ultra-Orthodoxy"). As regards Haredi Judaism, Schwab acknowledged that although Neo-Orthodoxy is not the path openly espoused by the majority of today's Roshei Yeshiva, the "Torah Only" and Torah Im Derech Eretz camps can exist side-by-side. "As long as one is prompted solely by Yiras Shamayim ("fear of Heaven") and a search for truth, each individual has a choice as to which school he should follow."

The movement is somewhat distant from Modern Orthodoxy. Schwab regards Modern Orthodoxy as having misinterpreted Hirsch's ideas: regarding standards of halakha as well as the relative emphasis of Torah versus secular; see discussion under Torah Umadda. Further, Breuer, influenced by Hirsch's philosophy on Austritt (secession), "could not countenance recognition of a non-believing body as a legitimate representative of the Jewish people". For this reason, he was "unalterably opposed to the Mizrachi movement, which remained affiliated with the World Zionist Organization and the Jewish Agency".

=== Contemporary influence ===
Torah im Derech Eretz remains influential as a philosophy in Orthodox Judaism. Although usually associated with the "Breuer's" community of Washington Heights, the philosophy remains an important influence in Modern Orthodox Judaism and, to some extent, in Haredi Judaism. (See also Divine Providence for discussion of derech eretz in contemporary Orthodox Judaism.)

==== Modern Orthodoxy ====
Torah im Derech Eretz is a major source of ideology for Modern Orthodoxy, particularly regarding the synthesis of Judaism and secular culture. Organizations on the left of Modern Orthodoxy have embraced the "broad interpretation", although critics say that, philosophical issues aside, their "relatively relaxed stance" in halakha in fact positions them outside the realm of Torah im Derech Eretz.

Further to the right, the "broad interpretation" is largely identical with Torah Umadda—Torah and secular knowledge—a philosophy of Modern Orthodoxy closely associated with Yeshiva University, which aims at synthesizing Torah learning and secular knowledge within the personality. The two are nevertheless distinct in terms of emphasis. Under Torah Umadda, "[w]e prefer to look upon science and religion as separate domains...", whereas Torah im Derech Eretz, aims at the domination of Torah over secular knowledge and the application of Torah thought to secular knowledge.

==== Neo-Orthodoxy ====
As above, the "Breuer" community continues to closely apply the philosophy. However, since World War II, the community, has moved away from the "median interpretation" toward the "narrow interpretation", as above. Rabbi Breuer saw the risk of misinterpretation of his grandfather's ideas (and confusion with Torah Umadda) especially post-war. He repeatedly stated that compromising on Jewishness and halakha was at variance with Torah im Derech Eretz, and emphasized the distinction between Modern Orthodoxy and Neo-Orthodoxy as regards the relationship between Torah and secular. "Rabbi Hirsch's fight was not for balance and not for reconcilement, nor for synthesis and certainly not for parallel power, but for domination – for the true and absolute domination of the divine precept over the new tendencies" (Isaac Breuer, Hirsch's grandson). See further in the article on Rabbi Hirsch and additionally under Modern Orthodoxy.

==== Haredi Judaism ====
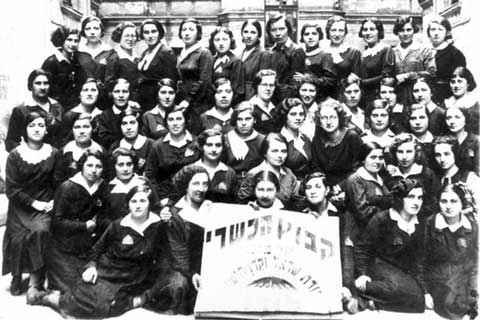
Torah im Derech Eretz shaped the curriculum of the Beis Yaakov school system. The second graduating class of the Beis Yaakov in Łódź, Poland, in 1934.

Today, the Haredi "Yeshiva communities" adhere to the "narrow interpretation" as an educational philosophy. Torah im Derech Eretz was the basic idea that shaped the curriculum of the Beis Yaakov school system, and continues to be influential. (In fact, in her Seminary in Kraków, Sarah Schenirer taught Rav Hirsch's writings in German. The (German-born) teachers spoke German and the Polish students learned German.) Similarly, the "narrow interpretation" guides the curricula at boys' high schools.

Other Haredi communities, the "Torah only" school, are further distant from Torah im Derech Eretz. Since World War II there has been an ideological tendency in that camp to devote all intellectual capabilities to Torah study only—in schools, yeshivot and kollels. Thus, the optimum course to be adopted in all cases is to devote oneself to full-time Torah learning for as long as possible; "to go out into the world is a course to be adopted only when there is no other alternative". Here, the Hirschian model is seen as horaat sha'ah, a "time-specific teaching" intended to apply to the special circumstances of Western Europe in the 1800s. (Note that Hirsch himself addressed this contention: "Torah im Derech Eretz ... is not part of troubled, time-bound notions; it represents the ancient, traditional wisdom of our sages that has stood the test everywhere and at all times." See further under Joseph Breuer.)
