= Mirkin =

Mirkin or Mirkina (feminine form in Slavic countries) is a surname. Notable people with the surname include:

- Boris Mirkin-Getzevich (1892–1955), Russian jurist
- Chad Mirkin (born 1963), American chemist
- David Mirkin (born 1955), American film and television director, writer and producer
- Gabe Mirkin (born 1935), American physician and journalist on sports medicine, nutrition, and health
- Harris G. Mirkin (1936–2013), American political scientist

== See also ==
- Merkin
