= Yeshiva Gedolah Frankfurt =

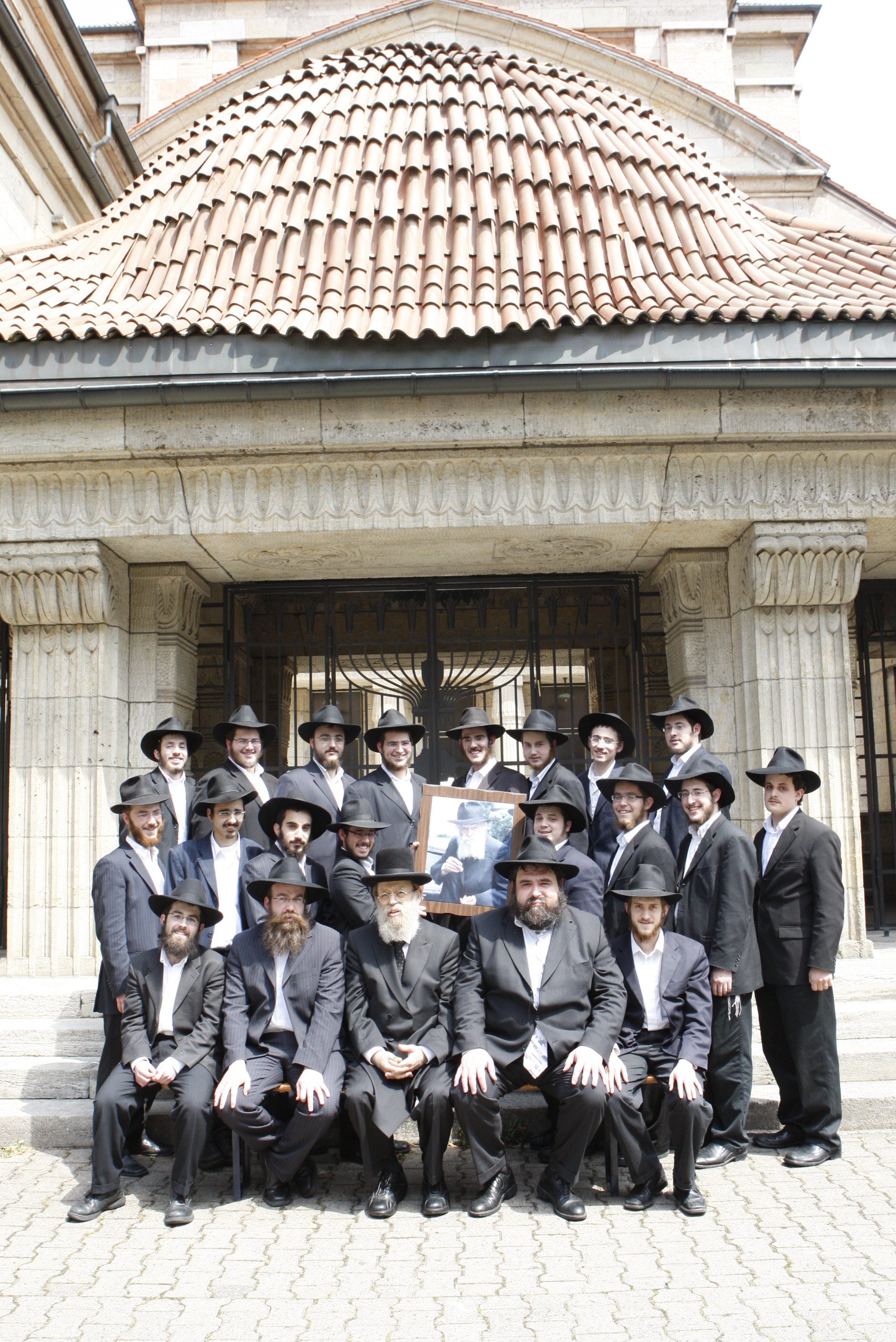
January 5, 2008

The Yeshivah Gedolah of Chabad Lubavitch in Frankfurt am Main is a Yeshiva operated by Chabad of Germany; see Tomchei Tmimim. The Director or Rosh Yeshivah is Rabbi Yossi Havlin; it was founded and continues to be run by Rabbi S. Zalman Gurevitch, Chabad Emissary to Frankfurt.

It is situated in the famous West-end Synagogue; the current bochurim come mainly from Israel and the United States. The Yeshivah Gedola was the first orthodox Yeshiva that was established in Germany after World War II (see also Rabbinerseminar zu Berlin). In a certain sense it continues the tradition of what once Germany's largest yeshiva, Torah Lehranstalt, which was organized in Frankfurt by Solomon Breuer, son-in-law and successor of Rabbi Samson Raphael Hirsch.

A regular study day for the bochurim includes Talmud, Jewish law, Jewish philosophy, and Jewish ethics; see Yeshiva § Curriculum.

In October 2023, the yeshiva reopened after being closed for several years before due to the COVID-19 pandemic. It reopened in a new format with bochurim from Oholei Torah, with special emphasis on the Chabad outreach programs in the Jewish Community in Frankfurt and the surrounding areas.
