= Shimon Schwab =

American rabbi (1908–1995)

Rav Shimon Schwab
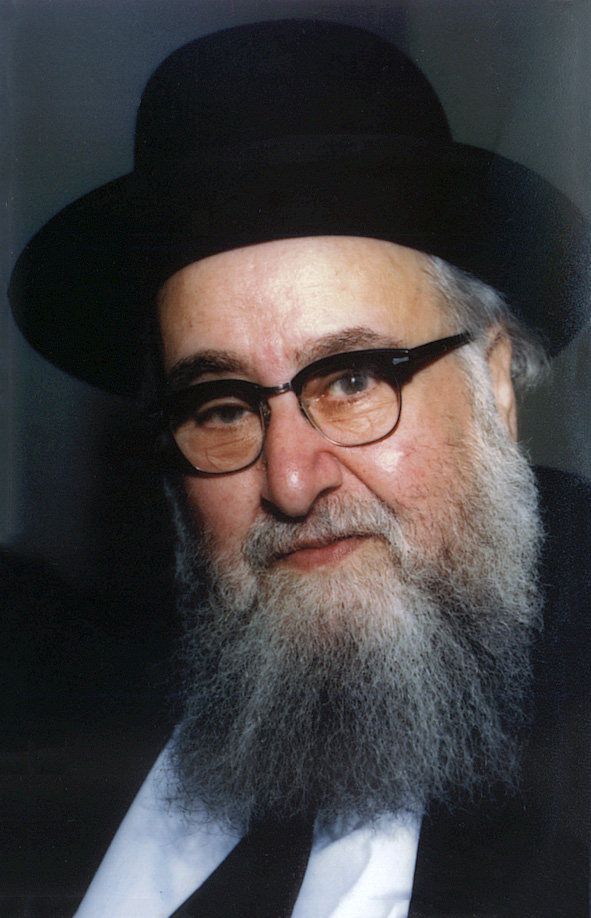

Personal life
- Born: December 30, 1908 Frankfurt am Main
- Died: February 13, 1995 (aged 86) New York City, New York

Religious life
- Religion: Judaism

Jewish leader
- Predecessor: Rav Joseph Breuer
- Successor: Rav Zechariah Gelley
- Synagogue: Khal Adath Jeshurun
- Yeshiva: Frankfurt Torah Lehranstalt, Telshe yeshiva, Mir yeshiva

Shimon (Simon) Schwab was an Orthodox rabbi and communal leader in Germany and the United States. Educated in Frankfurt am Main and in the yeshivas of Lithuania, he was rabbi in Ichenhausen, Bavaria, after immigration to the United States in Baltimore, and from 1958 until his death at Khal Adath Jeshurun in Washington Heights, Manhattan. He was an ideologue of Agudath Israel of America, specifically defending the Torah im Derech Eretz approach to Jewish life. He wrote several popular works of Jewish thought.

== Early life in Frankfurt ==
Shimon Schwab was born on December 30, 1908. He grew up in Frankfurt am Main, Germany. His family had been longstanding members of the Israelitische Religionsgesellschaft (IRG), the Orthodox Jewish community that had established its own independence from the Reform Judaism-dominated general community. The IRG had been led until 1888 by Rabbi Samson Raphael Hirsch and was then under the leadership of Rabbi Solomon Breuer, Hirsch's son-in-law.

Shimon completed the Realschule, the local school that combined religious studies and general subjects in conformity with the Torah im Derech Eretz ideology propagated by Rabbi Hirsch. After the Realschule he was a full-time student for a number of years in the Torah Lehranstalt, the local yeshiva founded by Rabbi Breuer.

== Studies in Lithuania ==
In 1926, at age 17, Shimon enrolled in the Telshe yeshiva located in Telšiai, Lithuania, where he studied Talmud intensively for three years, and afterwards spent one year and a half in the Mir yeshiva. It was not very common for German-Jewish students to study in Eastern-European yeshivot, but two of Shimon's brothers (Moshe and Mordechai) would later follow the same path.

In the spring of 1930, he spent a weekend with Rabbi Yisrael Meir Kagan (the Chafetz Chaim), then the leader of non-Hassidic Eastern-European Ashkenazi Jewry. The visit made a strong impression on him, and he would later often refer to the encounter in public speeches throughout his life.

After receiving semicha (rabbinic ordination), Rabbi Schwab relocated to Germany, and in Feb 1931, while still unmarried, he accepted the position of Rabbinatsassessor ("assistant rabbi") in Darmstadt. In October 1931 he married Recha Froehlich of Gelsenkirchen, and continued his post there until September 1933, at which time he accepted the post of community rabbi in Ichenhausen, Bavaria.

== Work in Ichenhausen ==
In Ichenhausen, Rabbi Schwab was involved in general rabbinic duties, but he also worked hard to establish a traditional yeshiva that would teach Mishnah and Talmud. He also published a booklet titled Heimkehr ins Judentum ("Coming Home to Judaism" published in 1934) exhorting his Jewish contemporaries to devote more time to in-depth Torah study and abandon their fascination with modern culture and social progress.

The yeshiva started off, but immediately ran into trouble as threats were made by local Nazi activists. In the end, the students were sent home after one day, and this incident probably inspired Rabbi Schwab to apply for a position overseas.

== Baltimore ==
Through the American Orthodox leader Rabbi Dr. Leo Jung he got in touch with a community called Shearith Israel in Baltimore. He travelled to the United States, and after a trial period the community elected him as a rabbi. The family was therefore able to apply for visas and escape the Holocaust.

In Baltimore, Schwab as the rabbi of community Shearith Israel became a local leader of Orthodoxy, hosting the annual conference of Agudath Israel several years after his arrival. He was involved in the first Jewish day school for girls, Beis Yaakov, and traveled to San Francisco in the late 1940s to act as a lobbyist during the early activities of the United Nations.

During a visit to Baltimore in the late 1930s, Rabbi Elchonon Wasserman had suggested that Schwab publish a work summarising the traditional Jewish view on messianic times. This book appeared anonymously in Hebrew under the title "Beis ha-Sho'eivah" in 1941.

== Washington Heights ==
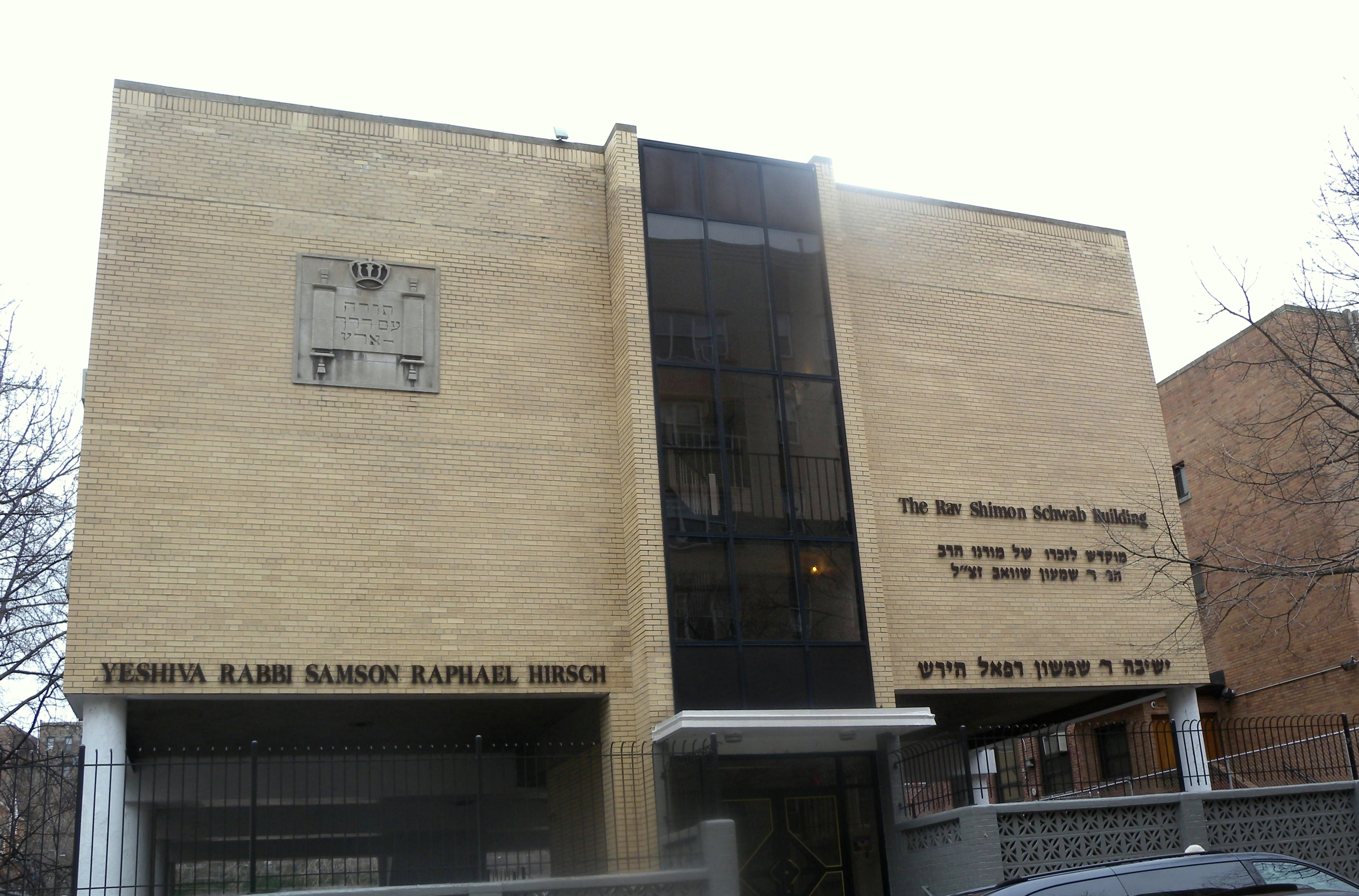
Shimon Schwab Building, Washington Heights

In 1958, Schwab was invited to join Rabbi Joseph Breuer in the leadership of the German-Jewish community in Washington Heights, located in upper Manhattan in New York City; see Khal Adath Jeshurun (Washington Heights, Manhattan). This community, widely regarded as the spiritual "continuation" of the pre-War Frankfurt kehilla ("community"), had been close to Rabbi Schwab's heart, and with Rabbi Breuer's increasing age and infirmity he took on many leadership roles until the latter's passing in 1980.

From then until 1993, he led the community alone. He continued to lecture and teach, but his health deteriorated and he died at the age of 86 on Purim katan, 1995. He was succeeded after his death by Rabbi Zechariah Gelley, the Sunderland (England) Rosh Yeshivah who had already joined the kehilla several years earlier as second Rav.

== Philosophy and ideas ==
Schwab, being a product of both the German Torah im Derech Eretz movement and the Eastern-European yeshiva world, initially identified strongly with the latter. During the 1960s, however, it became apparent to him that the continued emphasis on religious studies and downplay of secular education would be harmful to the community as a whole. He thus wrote his pamphlet "These and Those", in which he champions the Torah im Derech Eretz approach as being equally valid. (The title of the pamphlet is a quote from the Talmud - "These and those [Eilu va'Eilu] are the words of a Living God", emphasizing that both approaches are divinely sanctioned.)

Other points often discussed in his work the independence of Orthodoxy and the perceived materialistic excesses and expenses of the modern world, especially at weddings. He did not shirk from difficult and potentially controversial questions, such as those concerning the Jewish view on the age of the universe and problems in harmonising a 165-year gap in traditional Jewish history with scientifically accepted calculations.

Rav Schwab opposed both secular and religious Zionism, both in his writings and in his speeches. Though he said that even when rejecting these heretical ideas, we must still love those that the Torah commanded us to love. He also stressed that there "must never be any contact with organized heresy in whatever shape or form. When it comes to Zionism, especially the kind that has changed it from Realpolitik into a pre-Messianic religion, let us be firm and brave and defy all forces which tend to weaken our fundamentalist (yes) loyalty to the unadulterated heritage which we have received from our forebears. But all this without hate, without anger, and with great humility." In his opinion, Modern-Orthodox leaders who promoted Religious Zionism should not be given public recognition as representatives of Torah.

== Bibliography ==
- Simon Schwab (1934). Heimkehr ins Judentum. Frankfurt am Main: Hermon-Verlag. p. 153.
- Anonymous (1941). ספר בית השואבה : והוא קובץ מאמרים על עקבתא דמשיחא כולל פסוקים, מדרשים ומאמרי חז"ל עם פרושים (Beis ha-Sho'eivah). New York City: Shulsinger Brothers.
- These and Those, New York: Philipp Feldheim, 1966. 47 pages.
- Selected writings, CIS publishers, 1988; ISBN 0-935063-49-8.
- Selected speeches, CIS publishers, 1991; ISBN 1-56062-058-7.
- Selected essays, CIS publishers, 1994; includes "These and Those" and translated selections from "Heimkehr ins Judentum"; ISBN 1-56062-292-X.
- Shemesh Marpei (Hebrew), collected responsa, Talmudic novellae and biography of Rabbi Samson Raphael Hirsch, edited by Rabbi Eliyahu Meir Klugman; ISBN 1-4226-0806-9.
- Maayan Beth ha-Sho'eva, Torah interpretation, Mesorah publications 1994; ISBN 0-89906-031-5.
- Rav Schwab on Prayer (posthumously, compiled from taped lectures under the editorship of his eldest son Moses L. Schwab); ISBN 1-57819-512-8.
- Iyun Tefilla, Hebrew version of "Rav Schwab on Prayer". ISBN 1-57819-768-6
- Rav Schwab on Iyov - The teachings of Rabbi Shimon Schwab zt"l on the Book of Job (posthumously, commentary on the Book of Job, edited by Moses L. Schwab). Mesorah publications, 2006. ISBN 1-4226-0090-4.
- Rav Schwab on Yeshayahu - The teaching of Rabbi Shimon Schwab zt"l on the Book of Isaiah (posthumously, commentary on the Book of Isaiah, edited by Moses L. Schwab). Mesorah publications, 2009. ISBN 1-4226-0945-6.
- Rav Schwab on Ezra and Nechemia - The teaching of Rabbi Shimon Schwab zt"l on the return to Eretz Yisrael and the early years of the Second Beis Hamikdash period (posthumously, commentary on the Book of Ezra and the Book of Nehemiah, edited by Moses L. Schwab). Mesorah publications, 2012. ISBN 1-4226-1299-6.
