= Ursula Merkin =

American philanthropist

Ursula Merkin (1919–July 23, 2006) was a German-born American philanthropist.

== Life and career ==
She was born in Frankfurt, Germany to Isaac Breuer, a noted German Rabbi, as Ursula (Sara) Breuer. In 1933, at the age of fourteen, she left Germany with her family for Palestine. She remained there with her father, to whom she was very close, until his death in Jerusalem in 1946, at the age of 63. Shortly thereafter, she emigrated to the United States, where she found a teaching position at a Jewish girls' school in Paterson, New Jersey.

== Family and charitable causes ==
In 1950 she met and married Hermann Merkin, a German-Jewish businessman, who was twelve years her senior. They had six children and were married for almost fifty years until his death in 1999 at the age of 91. Ursula and Hermann Merkin sponsored the New York venue Merkin Concert Hall and were involved in a variety of Yeshiva University functions as well as with other Jewish philanthropies. They were also deeply devoted to Fifth Avenue Synagogue, of which Hermann Merkin was the founding President.

Ursula Breuer Merkin was a granddaughter of Solomon Breuer, a great-granddaughter of Samson Raphael Hirsch, a great-granddaughter of Eliezer Liepman Philip Prins, and mother of writer Daphne Merkin and philanthropist J. Ezra Merkin. Her brothers were Jacob Breuer, and Mordechai Breuer. Her niece, Michal Scheller Lupolianski was married to Jerusalem Mayor Uri Lupolianski. She was best known for her involvement with Reuth, an Israeli charity for the elderly. She maintained a strong tie to, and a great love for, the Holy Land until her death in 2006. She was known by most as "Ullah."

== Writing career ==
She also wrote a novel, Borrowed Lands, which was published by Rubin Mass Ltd. in 2000 in a second revised edition.

== Death ==
She died in New York City on July 23, 2026 at the age of 86 after a bout with lung cancer.
