= Harris G. Mirkin =

American political scientist (1936–2013)

Harris George Mirkin (24 August 1936 – 30 May 2013) was a political science professor at the University of Missouri-Kansas City. He served in the Peace Corps in Ethiopia from 1962 to 1964, and earned his Ph.D. from Princeton University in 1967.

Mirkin aroused controversy with his article "The Pattern of Sexual Politics," published in 1999 in the Journal of Homosexuality. The article claimed that the current societal view of pedophiles is comparable to how women and gay men were viewed in the past. It further claimed that the present taboo on pedophilia was just a social construction, not based on anything real; and that pedophiles might be on their way to acceptance.

This prompted the Missouri House of Representatives to reduce the university's budget by the amount of Mirkin's salary, as a gesture of non-support for Mirkin's work. Writing in The New Yorker, Louis Menand criticized the legislature's action as harmful to academic freedom, stating that error is a necessary part of the process. Menand further criticized Mirkin's article, calling it silly, and compared cultures that accepted pedophilia to the many cultures that accepted slavery. He also stated that it is the prohibition of pedophilia that is part of civil and sexual freedom, including the freedom of children from adults who hold authority over them.

== See also ==
- Child sexual abuse
