= J. Ezra Merkin =

American investor (born 1953)

Ezra Merkin
- Born: Jacob Ezra Merkin; April 19, 1953 (age 73)
- Other name: The Rabbi
- Education: Yeshivat Har Etzion; Yeshivat Kerem B'Yavneh; Columbia University; Harvard University
- Board member of: Columbia College

Jacob Ezra Merkin (born April 19, 1953) is an American investor, hedge fund manager and philanthropist. He had been a fund manager and capital raiser until 2008 when one of the funds in Gabriel Capital LP, his $5 billion group of hedge funds became insolvent because a large portion of its assets was invested with the convicted Ponzi scheme operator Bernard Madoff. The fallout from his investment with Madoff has been extensive. He navigated a series of lawsuits without a finding of fraud or knowledge of the scheme, but agreed to repay any fees earned from the investment in Madoff historically. He had to resign a series of positions including his role as non-executive chairman of GMAC.

== Personal ==
Merkin is the son of prominent businessman Hermann Merkin and Ursula Merkin (née Ursula Sara Breuer), both German-born Orthodox Jews who fled Germany prior to World War II to escape Nazism. Merkin's sister is Daphne Merkin, a writer. He and his wife, Lauren, have four children.

On May 20, 2009, he resigned as President of Fifth Avenue Synagogue, which was founded by his father in 1959. Members include some of his largest Madoff-related investors, losing in total, more than $1 billion.

Merkin attended Ramaz, an Upper East Side Modern Orthodox prep school, Yeshivat Kerem B'Yavneh and Yeshivat Har Etzion yeshivas in Israel, then Columbia University and Harvard Law School.

In 1995, he paid $11 million for an 18-room duplex formerly owned by Ron Perelman, a member of his synagogue, at 740 Park Avenue, sometimes referred to as "the world's richest apartment Building." In 2003, he began to collect 12 Mark Rothko paintings, the largest private collection in the world, worth an estimated $150 million. The Rothkos were sold in 2008, under an agreement with the receiver, for $320 million.

Merkin also owns a home in Atlantic Beach, New York, valued at $1.7 million, and a property in Eagle County, Colorado, worth $506,000.

== Business background ==
"It's very, very difficult for Ezra to make decisions. He worried about the big picture, fretted over allocations. His gift was that he was a world-class salesman. He recognized that many people didn't have (investment decision) confidence, that if people had confidence in him, then he could give them confidence," said one money manager who worked with him over the years.

From 1979 to 1982, he worked for the law firm Milbank Tweed. He worked at Halcyon Investments from 1982 to 1985. He moved on to Halcyon, a hedge fund run by Alan B. Slifka, his father's friend. There he met Joel Greenblatt, who founded Gotham Capital in 1985, where Merkin worked until 1988, as an analyst and a managing partner in Gotham Capital LP and Ariel Capital LP.

In 1988, he started Gabriel Capital to raise capital, and funnel it to managers in exchange for a fee. By 1992, Merkin was raising money and co-managing securities with and for Stephen A. Feinberg, a manager whose private-equity firm Cerberus Capital Management, later bought controlling shares in Chrysler (80%) and GMAC (51%, at a cost of $6.4 billion), the financing arm of General Motors. Merkin invested his funds into Cerberus and its portfolio companies. His Gabriel fund invested $79 million in Chrysler, $66 million in GMAC, and $67 million in Cerberus partnerships, according to year-end statements. Although Cerberus lost its controlling stake in Chrysler, ultimately, investors in Chrysler and GMC received more than their investment back in proceeds.

In 2005, Cerberus and Gabriel bought a 9.9% combined interest in Bank Leumi, but in April 2009, decided to sell to boost liquidity due to their substantial financial losses in 2008.

Merkin managed Ascot Partners LP, a hedge fund which was valued at $1.8 billion prior to the collapse of Bernard L. Madoff Investment Securities LLC.

=== GMAC ===
In 2006, Cerberus appointed Merkin as nonexecutive Chairman of GMAC, a large investment for Cerberus. This investment was nearly a washout, but ultimately Cerberus investors recouped their capital. However, in January 2009, Merkin had to resign from his chairmanship as a condition of the U.S. Federal Reserve granting GMAC bank holding company status, so it could obtain access to bailout money.

=== Victor Teicher ===
Victor Teicher specialized in merger-related investments. In 1988 he was indicted for insider trading, convicted in 1990, and in 1994 jailed for a year.

In August 1998, Merkin again hired Teicher to manage about $1 billion as an independent operator, paying him $1 million a year plus incentives. In 1988 Merkin began putting a substantial portion of the money he raised for Gabriel Capital with Teicher. From 1988 to 1998, Teicher actually managed Merkin's off-shore, Ariel fund and Gabriel Capital. Merkin "occupied himself primarily with raising money for the funds using his extensive social and professional network."

While in jail, Teicher was running about $375 million from Merkin's investors. In January 1995, Merkin took over Teicher's staff, put Gabriel Capital's name on the door, and hired Nathan Leight to manage the money.

Teicher had told Merkin not to invest with Madoff because such steady returns were impossible. After Madoff's arrest, Teicher immediately sent some emails to Merkin:

You, however, took a brilliant career and actively, willingly, wiped your ass with it when it was obvious that you (knew what you) were doing.

The Madoff news is hilarious;hope you negotiate out of this mess as well as possible....Unfortunately, you've paid a big price for a lesson on the cost of being greedy.

I guess you did such a good job in fooling a lot of people, you ultimately fooled yourself...a man's name tells you who he is; Madoff made off with the money.

== Bernard Madoff scandal ==
Ultimately, Merkin's investments with Madoff were extraordinarily costly for his investors and for him personally – both in dollars and in terms of reputation.

Merkin's funds had been longtime investors in Madoff. Starting in 1992, Merkin began investing some of the funds under his management into Madoff, collecting an annual fee of 1 – 1.5% of the funds' total assets. By 2005, Merkin earned about $35 million a year simply for funneling money to Madoff. Merkin invested personally and through family trusts and foundations $7 million in Ascot in its first six years, and less than $2 million over the following 10 years. He did not reinvest his $169 million in management fees for the years 1995 to 2007 back into his Ascot Partners, although he had more than $100 million in personal capital invested through his funds in Madoff.

Merkin was charged with fraud with connection with the Madoff investments. Ultimately, he prevailed in the fraud cases and no court ruled that he had any actual knowledge of the Madoff fraud. Although ultimately, this case was settled without a finding of fraud by Merkin, Merkin agreed to return any fees which he earned over the years associated with investments in Madoff's fund.

Merkin was hit with a series of lawsuits from disgruntled investors to recover funds lost in the Madoff scandal, but in most of these cases Merkin prevailed. Merkin had been sued for his role in running a "feeder fund" for Madoff.

Merkin lost three arbitration cases related to the Madoff investments. The cases included findings of negligence by Merkin but not fraud.

On May 7, 2009, Madoff Bankruptcy Trustee, Irving Picard filed a lawsuit against Merkin seeking to recover almost $500 million withdrawn from Madoff accounts in the last six years. The complaint alleged that since 1995, Merkin steered more than $1.0 billion to Madoff through three private hedge funds, Ascot Partners, Ariel Fund, and Gabriel Capital. Since 2002, the funds withdrew at least $494 million from Madoff – returns that Merkin "knew or should have known" were fraudulent. There were at least 500 instances in the last 10 years when his Madoff account statements showed large blocks of stock bought or sold at prices that did not match the stock's trading range for the day when the transactions supposedly occurred. Merkin was not shown to have had actual knowledge of any wrongdoing and won this case.

As of May 18, 2009, Merkin's control of Ascot, Gabriel and Ariel hedge funds were placed into receivership for liquidation by Guidepost Partners. One receiver was responsible for managing the remaining money, nearly $1 billion, in the Gabriel and Ariel funds, and another was responsible for overseeing Ascot, whose entire $1.8 billion in assets was lost to Madoff's Ponzi scheme. New York University was given until the end of May 2009 to review the agreement. Merkin collected over $470 million for managing three funds, Ariel, Gabriel and Ascot Partners, over the last decade, of which he paid back $405 million to investors after finding out about the Madoff scheme. The three funds had about $1.4 billion in assets remaining in 2009 with about $700 million in Ariel.

On June 22, 2012, Merkin agreed to pay back $405 million to investors in his hedge funds without any finding of fraud on his part. Picard, however, sued in bankruptcy court to stop the settlement, saying it obstructed his own effort to obtain $500 million from Merkin and his funds for other investors. Ultimately, Picard's suit to stop the settlement was unsuccessful.
