= Ben-Or =

Ben Or or Ben-Or (Hebrew: בן-אור) is a Hebrew surname. Notable people with the surname include:

- Aharon Ben-Or (1890–1972) Hebrew writer, teacher, and researcher of the history of Hebrew literature
- Michael Ben-Or Israeli computer scientist
- Nava Ben-Or (born 1955), Israeli judge and lawyer
- Nelly Ben-Or, British concert pianist and professor of music
