= Daphne Merkin =

American literary critic, essayist and novelist

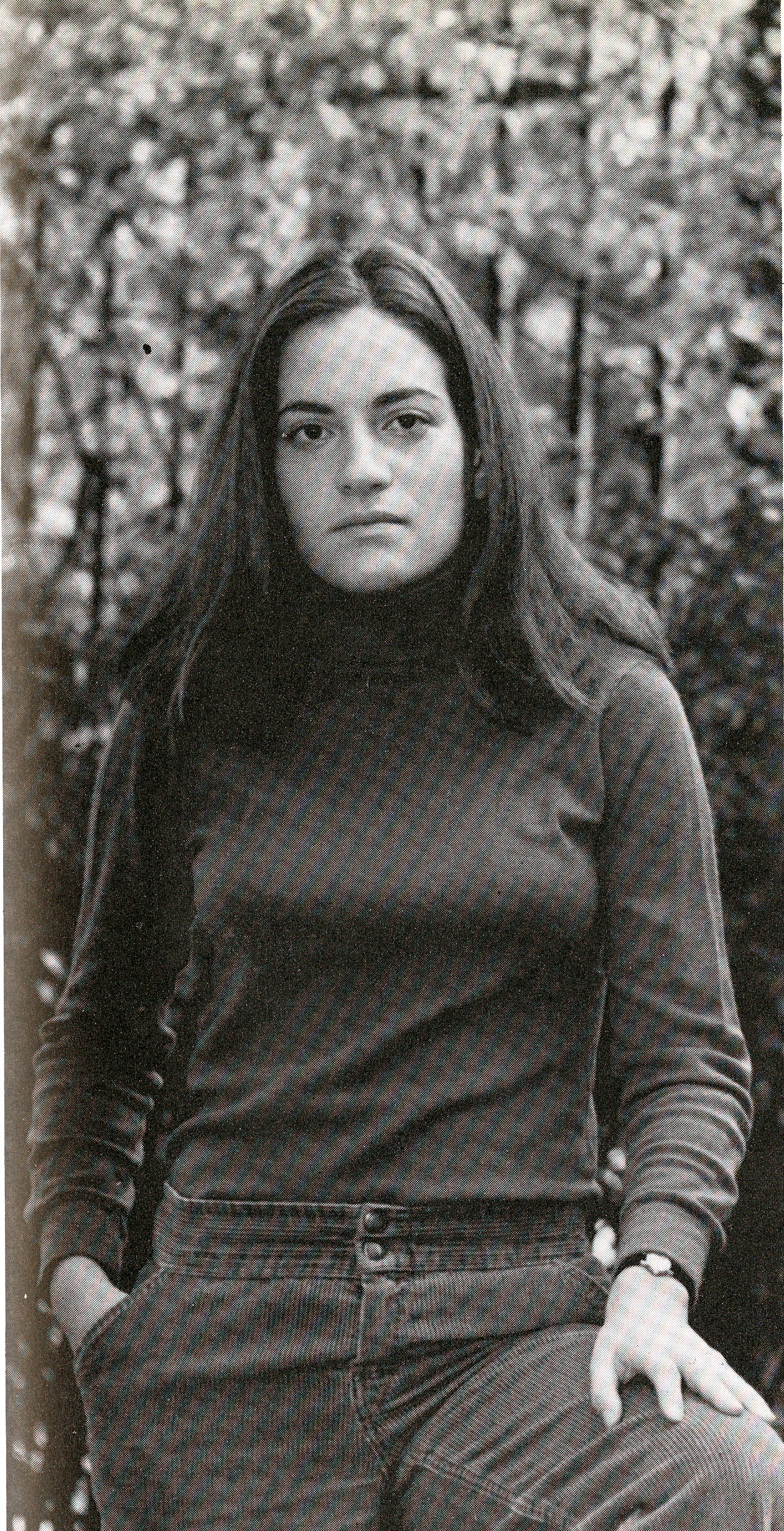
Daphne Merkin

Daphne Miriam Merkin (born May 30, 1954) is an American literary critic, essayist and novelist. Merkin is a graduate of Barnard College and also attended Columbia University's graduate program in English literature.

She began her career as a book critic for the magazines Commentary, The New Republic, and The New Leader, where she wrote a book column and later, a movie column. In 1986, she became an editor with the publishing house of Harcourt Brace Jovanovich. In 1997, after Tina Brown became editor of The New Yorker, Merkin became a film critic for the magazine. She also wrote extensively on books and became known for her frank forays into autobiography; her personal essays dealt with subjects ranging from her battle with depression, to her predilection for spanking, to the unacknowledged complexities of growing up rich on Park Avenue. In 2005, she joined The New York Times Magazine as a contributing writer. She is the author of a novel, Enchantment (1984) as well as two collections of essays, Dreaming of Hitler (1997) and The Fame Lunches (2014), and a memoir, This Close to Happy: A Reckoning With Depression (2017). Her latest novel, 22 Minutes of Unconditional Love (2020), came out in July 2020.

Her parents were the philanthropists Hermann and Ursula Merkin. Her brother is J. Ezra Merkin, a hedge fund manager and philanthropist who was embroiled in the Bernie Madoff scandal.

Merkin teaches writing at the 92nd Street Y. She married and divorced Michael Brod, and lives on the Upper East Side of Manhattan with her daughter, Zoe. She is also a contributing editor to Tablet magazine.
