= Mala Breuer =

American artist (1927–2017)

- Born: Mala Breuer; December 21, 1927; Oakland, California, U.S.
- Died: January 1, 2017 (aged 89); Santa Fe, New Mexico, U.S.
- Education: San Francisco Art Institute; California College of the Arts; San Francisco State University
- Known for: Painting
- Movement: Abstract expressionism
- Awards: National Endowment for the Arts Fellowship (1996), SITE Santa Fe Award (1995), Pollock-Krasner Award (1991)

Mala Breuer (December 21, 1927 in Oakland, California – January 1, 2017 in Santa Fe, New Mexico) was an American Abstract Expressionist. Her work is in the collections of the San Francisco Museum of Modern Art, Albright Knox Art Gallery in Buffalo, and the Museum of Fine Arts, Santa Fe, New Mexico.

== Early life and education ==
Born in Oakland, California, Mala Breuer grew up attending courses in painting and drawing at the California College of Arts and Crafts. Upon graduating from high school she was accepted to the, now, San Francisco Art Institute with a scholarship. There, she studied under many notable artists and faculty members, including Richard Diebenkorn, Clyfford Still, David Park, and Mark Rothko. Breuer matured as an artist in the era of Abstract Expressionism, a movement known for its focus on material and application, rather than representation. She recalls a split between realists and abstractionists in the student body at San Francisco Art Institute. “A student really had to make the choice,” Breuer explained. “I was a beginning student, but by the second or third semester I made a strong decision that it was abstract painting that I wanted to do. From the beginning it felt less materialistic and more spiritual.” During her second year Clyfford Still offered her a small studio space at the school.

Breuer left school after her second year; marrying and having two children with a fellow artist. She supported her family by working part-time at the UC Berkeley Library. However, all the while she maintained a studio practice, consisting of watercolors and drawings. She returned to school and received her Bachelor of Fine Arts in 1966 from the California College of Arts and Crafts, and in 1970 received her Master of Arts in Painting from San Francisco State University. Upon graduation there were no openings in California for painting instructors, and she was placed on a long waiting list of applicants at various institutions. For the time being, she substitute taught in the Oakland and Berkeley schools, where she was offered a permanent position teaching art courses in 1973, she remained there for four years.

== Artistic practice ==
By the late 1960s, Breuer was pouring water thinned washes of brightly colored acrylic paint onto large, wet, stretched, vertical canvases in her Bay Area studio. During a 1974 exhibition of those works at Zara Gallery in San Francisco, local gallerist Hank Baum suggested that she head to New York, where Abstract Expressionism, Minimalism, and Conceptual Art were continuing to gain traction. Breuer listened to this advice and set out to New York soon after with intentions of staying only one year, she stayed for eight.

Upon settling in New York in 1976, she rented a studio space from Julian Schnabel. Her quiet studio routine was often interrupted by Julian Schnabel smashing ceramic plates for his, now, famous “plate paintings”. It was in that studio that she began working with a palette knife, making direct, abstract marks with dark color, weight, and density in continuous patterned bands across the canvas. During her time in New York she regularly participated in solo and group exhibitions at various galleries, including James Yu, Davis and Long Co., Salander/O'Reilly, SoHo Center for Visual Artists, Hadler Rodriguez, and Craig Cornelius.

Breuer relocated to New Mexico in 1984. The southwest landscape influenced her use of color, light, and Minimalist aesthetics. While her compositional strategy of placing marks within vertical bands remained consistent, her palette of pale colored brushstrokes of paint and beeswax sparingly spread across white or off-white grounds became standard in her work for the rest of her career. Breuer completed countless watercolors and works paper throughout her practice, each on preceded every large work on canvas. Through watercolor, Breuer could quickly work out her color palette, use of pattern, and composition before translating it to larger scale. In the last decade of her painting practice she was recognized with awards from the National Endowment for the Arts, SITE Santa Fe, and the Pollock-Krasner Foundation. Breuer lived in New Mexico where she painted for over thirty years then retired from her studio.

== Critical reception ==
Mary Stofflet of ArtWeek stated, “Breuer…studied under Rothko and Diebenkorn. The relationship to Rothko is obvious – large flatly colored areas, which blend at the edges, pink-to-maroon and red-to-maroon color range. But the pigments in her works are stronger, and the effect is one of deep glowing pools invaded by irregularly shaped fingers of contrasting, crisp colors or washes of paler tones.”

Dean Balsamo of The New Mexican stated, “In selecting New Mexico residents Agnes Martin, Florence Pierce, and Mala Breuer, guest curator Elizabeth Dunham chooses to feature mature visions of artists with decades-long commitments to their individual creative expressions.”

Grant Vetter of The Arts Beacon stated, “For having maintained this rare balance, and for the amazing strength to have gone it alone, not necessarily against the tide, but surfing the tunnel of the wave from the inside, Breuer’s work deserves not just a second look, but genuine recognition. There are few rare authentic voices such as Mala Breuer and it’s worth the opportunity to see this selective look back at what she achieved, not online in New York, but here in the Southwest, a place that Breuer still calls home.”

Jo Ann Lewis of The Washington Post stated, “A protégé of Clyfford Still in her native San Francisco, Breuer shines here in a pair of untitled paintings built from short, curving brushstrokes that climb the canvas like espaliered vines. They take their power from the intensity of their calligraphy and the surprising passages of layered color, which read as half-hidden, witty messages to each other. At 66, after years of working as a teacher and a librarian, Breuer appears to be going full throttle.”

Kathleen Shields of Parallaxis: Fifty-Five Points of View stated, "Breuer's paintings are like pages in a visual diary that records, however distilled, her physical surroundings and the very process of mark-making as a means of articulating for herself and others a sense of being in the world".

== Selected awards and honors ==
- 1996 Visual Arts Fellowship, Western States Art Federation, National Endowment for the Arts
- 1995 SITE Santa Fe Award
- 1991 Pollock-Krasner Award

== Selected solo exhibitions ==
- 2015 Mala Breuer, From New York to Santa Fe, Bentley Gallery, Phoenix, AZ
- 2008 Mala Breuer: Early Works 1970–1980, Charlotte Jackson Fine Art, Santa Fe, NM
- 1998 Charlotte Jackson Fine Art, Santa Fe, NM
- 1996 Thomas Blackman Associates, Chicago, Illinois
- 1995 Richard Levy Gallery, Albuquerque, NM
- 1993–94 Laura Carpenter Fine Art Gallery, Santa Fe, NM
- 1988–90 Graham Gallery, Albuquerque, NM
- 1983 Craig Cornelius Gallery, New York, NY
- 1981 Hadler/Rodriguez Gallery, New York, NY
- 1980 SoHo Center for Visual Arts, New York, NY
- 1976 Source Gallery, San Francisco, CA
- 1975 Icehouse, San Francisco, CA
- 1974 Susan Rush Associates, San Francisco, CA
- 1974 Zara Gallery, San Francisco, CA
- 1965–67 Labaudt Gallery, San Francisco, CA

== Selected group exhibitions ==
- 2005 Back to Basics: A Group Show, Charlotte Jackson Fine Art, Santa Fe, NM
- 2005 The Natalie and Irving Forman Collection, Albright-Knox Gallery, Buffalo, NY
- 2002–04 Emi Winter, Mala Breuer, Roger Walker, James Kelly Contemporary, Santa Fe, NM
- 2002 Galerie Albrecht, Munich, Germany
- 2002 Farm Art Space, Missoula, MT
- 1998 Artscrawl Summer Group Show I and II, Richard Levy Gallery, Albuquerque, NM
- 1998 San Francisco International Exposition, San Francisco, CA
- 1996 Richard Levy Gallery, Albuquerque, NM
- 1995–96 Award Recipient Exhibition – SITE Santa Fe Honors New Mexico Artists, SITE Santa Fe, Santa Fe, NM
- 1994–96 Still Working, National Artists Opening, The Corcoran Gallery of Art, Washington DC
- 1993 Three Women – Agnes Martin, Mala Breuer, Florence Pierce, Charlotte Jackson Fine Art, Santa Fe, NM
- 1989 Center for Contemporary Arts, Santa Fe, NM
- 1988 Keats Gallery, Santa Fe, NM
- 1988 Marilyn Butler Gallery Invitational, Santa Fe, NM
- 1979 New Work, Nieuw Amsterdam, New York, NY
- 1978–81 Hank Baum Gallery Invitational, San Francisco, CA
- 1977 Davis and Long Gallery, New York, NY
- 1977 James Yu Invitational, New York, NY
- 1975 New Works by West Coast Artists, Susan Rush Gallery, San Francisco, CA
- 1958 San Francisco Museum of Art Annual, San Francisco, CA

== Selected public collections ==
Sources:

- San Francisco Museum of Modern Art, San Francisco, CA
- Albright Knox Art Gallery, Buffalo, NY
- Museum of Fine Arts, Santa Fe, NM
- Albuquerque Museum, Albuquerque, NM
- Richard Levy Gallery, Albuquerque, NM
- FIAC, Paris, France
- Capital Group, Los Angeles, CA
- Laura Carpenter Fine Art Gallery, Santa Fe, NM
- James Kelly Contemporary, Santa Fe, NM

== Selected reviews and articles ==
Sources:

- 2015 "From New York to Santa Fe, Mala Breuer Channels her Environment in Abstract Paintings," K Sundberg, Artsy Editorial, Article
- 2015 "Mala Breuer at Bentley Gallery: A Retrospective in Four Parts," Grant Vetter, The Arts Beacon, Review
- 2008 "Charlotte Jackson Fine Art Presents Mala Breuer: Early Works 1970–1980," Artnet, Article
- 1998 "The crowning importance of coruscant color: Mala Breuer paints possibilities," Craig Smith, The New Mexican, Review
- 1996 "Patterns of Life," Fred Camper, Chicago Reader, Review
- 1994 "Still Working: Late Bloomers in Full Flower," Jo Ann Lewis, The Washington Post, Review
- 1993 "Three Women," Dean Balsamo, The New Mexican, Review
- 1974 "Walsh's Ceramics, Breuer's Paintings," Mary Stofflet, ArtWeek, Review
