= Thomas C. Breuer =

German writer and cabaret artist

Thomas C. Breuer (born 15 October 1952) is a German writer and cabaret artist.

Breuer was born in Eisenach, Thuringia. Since 1977, he has performed cabaret in Germany, Switzerland and North America. He also works regularly for television and writes satire and novels. His twenty-fifth book, Hitze in Dosen, was published in 2007.

== Selected works ==
- Säntimäntls Reise, Roman (1986).
- Schnell Époque. Rasante Stimmungsbilder aus deutschen Landen, rororo, (1987), ISBN 3499158647
- Sekt in der Wasserleitung, Roman (1996).
- Heidelberger Demenz, Satiren (1997).
- Stadt Land Blues. Einseitige Geschichten (2000).
- Schweizerkreuz und quer (2001).
- Paradies etc. (2002).
- Schweizfahren (2005).
- Hitze in Dosen. Ein Soundtrack (2007).
