= Hermann Merkin =

Hermann Merkin (born 1907 in Leipzig, Germany, died March 9, 1999, in New York City) was a German-born American businessman and philanthropist.

== Biography ==
Merkin's father, Leib Merkin was a successful furrier in native Leipzig. In the 1930s Merkin's family fled Germany to escape Nazi persecution and came to New York City in 1940. Soon after coming to the United States, Merkin joined the Army as an intelligence and counterintelligence officer. After the war, he purchased a seat on the New York Stock Exchange, and founded Merkin & Company, an investment firm. He met and married Ursula Breuer in 1950 in New York City and had six children (three sons and three daughters); at the time of his death, he had 20 grandchildren. He lived in New York City.

== Charity work ==
Merkin was a founder of the Fifth Avenue Synagogue on the Upper East Side near Central Park, together with his father, Leib Merkin and Henry Hirsh. He and his wife Ulla, sponsored the well-known Merkin Concert Hall in New York City and also gave generously to Mount Sinai Hospital, Yeshiva University- sponsoring a chair in memory of his father Leib Merkin and a college in memory of his late father-in-law, Isaac Breuer. The school (IBC) or Isaac Breuer College of Hebraic Studies is an undergraduate program at Yeshiva University, where he served on the board of trustees for over three decades, even holding the position of chairman for a short time. He also gave generously to and many other Jewish charities; the Merkins were particularly interested in furthering Jewish education through philanthropic gifts.

== Death ==
Merkin died at age 91, in New York City, of congestive heart failure.

He is the father of noted businessman J. Ezra Merkin, and of writer and critic Daphne Merkin.
