= Jacob Breuer =

Yaakov Bar-Or
- יעקב בר-אור
- Yaakov Bar-Or at the trial of Adolf Eichmann
- Born: Jacob Breuer; 1916; Germany
- Died: 2008 (aged 91–92); Jerusalem, Israel
- Resting place: Mount of Olives Jewish Cemetery, Jerusalem
- Other name: Jacob Breuer
- Education: Law (Germany)
- Occupations: Lawyer, Prosecutor
- Employer: Israeli Government
- Known for: Assistant prosecutor at the Adolf Eichmann trial
- Notable work: Eichmann in Jerusalem
- Title: District Attorney General
- Term: 1959–1961
- Family: Isaac Breuer (father)

Jacob Breuer, later Yaakov Bar-Or (Hebrew: יעקב בר-אור; 1916–2008), was a German-born Israeli lawyer. He was born to Jenny and Isaac Breuer in 1916. He studied law in Germany and became a successful attorney. Later, he moved to Israel and assumed the surname "Bar-Or". He dropped the name change later in life.

Breuer came to Israel in the 1930s and became a lawyer in 1943. In 1959, he was appointed District Attorney General in Tel Aviv. That same year he was appointed Israeli delegate to the United Nations and sat on the committee for human rights. In 1961 Breuer was assistant prosecutor in the trial of Adolf Eichmann. This was the only execution and execution trial in the history of the state of Israel.

He died in 2008 in Jerusalem at the age of 92.

His brother was the historian, Mordechai Breuer. His sisters were Ursula Merkin and Tzippora Breuer Schneller. His niece, Michael Schneller Luplianski was married to Jerusalem Mayor Uri Lupolianski.
