= Torah Lehranstalt =

Orthodox Jewish yeshiva in Frankfurt am Main

- Other names: Frankfurt Yeshiva; Breuer Yeshiva
- Type: Yeshiva
- Active: 1893–1938
- Founders: Rabbi Salomon Breuer
- Religious affiliation: Orthodox Judaism
- Rosh yeshiva: Rabbi Salomon Breuer; Rabbi Joseph Breuer
- Students: approx. 150
- Location: Frankfurt am Main, Hesse, Germany

Torah Lehranstalt, also known as the Frankfurt Yeshiva or the Breuer Yeshiva, was an Orthodox Jewish yeshiva in Frankfurt am Main, founded in 1893 by Rabbi Dr. Solomon Breuer, the rabbi of the city's seceded Orthodox community (the Israelitische Religionsgesellschaft, Khal Adath Jeshurun).

== History ==
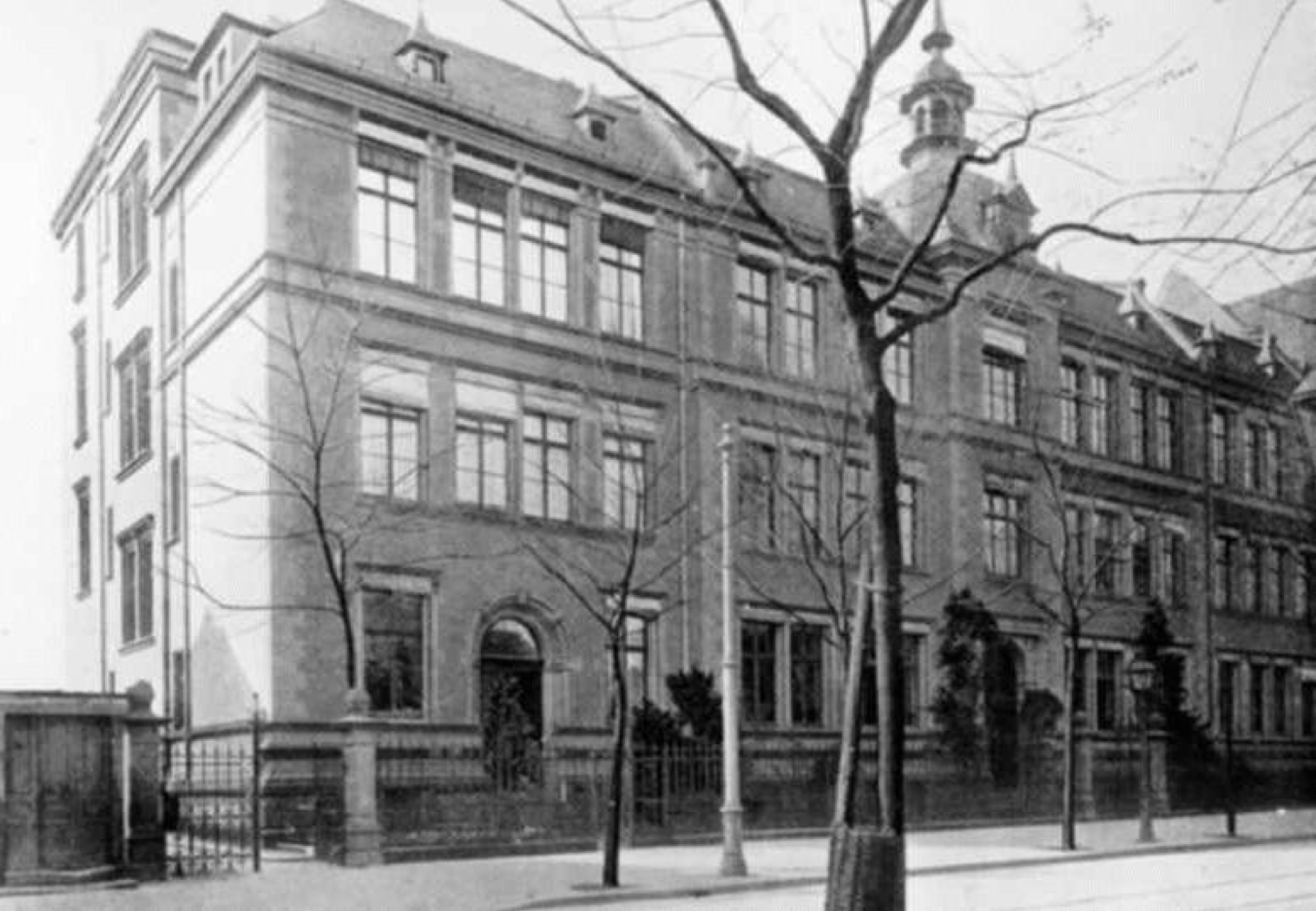
The Samson Raphael Hirsch Realschule

Rabbi Breuer served as the rabbi of Frankfurt's seceded Orthodox Jewish community, having received the position after the death of his father-in-law, Rabbi Samson Raphael Hirsch. In 1893, he founded the Torah Lehranstalt yeshiva, aiming to raise his community's appreciation of Torah study.

The yeshiva was run in the style of the Hungarian yeshivas which Rabbi Breuer had studied in prior. Besides for the classic Gemara study, the yeshiva also included a secular studies program as well as classes in Jewish history and Nevi'im. There was also a focus on studying the laws of Shabbos, kashruth, prayer, and blessings.

In 1911, his son, Rabbi Joseph Breuer, joined the yeshiva faculty and introduced a learning program where the older students of Torah Lehranstalt studied together with the younger students from the community's Orthodox high school, the Samson Raphael Hirsch Realschule. This convinced the Realschule students to enroll in yeshiva after graduation.

In 1921, the yeshiva was divided into five levels of study, with approximately thirty students in each track. While the students were primarily Germans, many came from Hungary, Austria, and Moravia as well.

After the death of Rabbi Solomon Breuer in 1926, his son Rabbi Joseph Breuer became rosh yeshiva (dean). The yeshiva closed at the onset of the Holocaust.

Rabbi Breuer left Germany in 1938 and became the leader of Khal Adath Jeshurun community in New York.

In some sense, the Yeshiva Gedolah Frankfurt established in 2000, continues the tradition.

== Notable alumni ==
- Rabbi Isaac Breuer
- Rabbi Shimon Schwab
- Rabbi Dr. Joseph (Yosef) Breuer
- Rabbi Dr. Leo (Yehudah) Breslauer
