= Mordechai Breuer (historian) =

German-Jewish historian and writer (1918–2007)

- מרדכי ברויאר
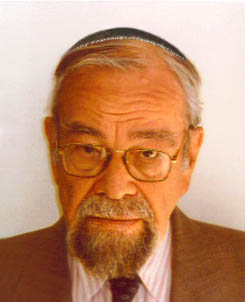
- Prof. Mordechai Breuer
- Born: 8 April 1918; Frankfurt, Hesse-Nassau, Germany
- Died: 28 May 2007 (aged 89); Israel
- Parent(s): Isaac Breuer and Jenny Eisenmann

Mordechai Breuer (Hebrew: מרדכי ברויאר; April 8, 1918 – May 28, 2007) was a German-Jewish historian and writer.

== Background and Family ==
Breuer was born in Frankfurt am Main (Germany) to Isaac Breuer and his wife Jenny Breuer (née Eisenmann) in 1918. He had four siblings: Yaakov, who prosecuted Adolf Eichmann; Ulla, Tzipora, and Simeon. The family originated in Frankfurt but left for Israel in 1936. His niece Michal Lupolianski was married to Jerusalem Mayor Uri Lupolianski.

== Work ==
Breuer wrote extensively on history, particularly German Jewish history. His works include Modernity Within Tradition: The Social History of Orthodox Jewry in Imperial Germany, (Columbia University Press: 1992) and The Torah-im-Derekh-Eretz of S.R. Hirsch (1970).
