= Isaac Breuer =

- Title: Rabbi Dr

Personal life
- Born: 18 September 1883 Pápa, Austria-Hungary
- Died: 10 August 1946 (aged 62) Jerusalem, Mandatory Palestine
- Spouse: Jenny Esther Breuer née Eisenmann
- Children: Jacob Breuer (1915–2008); Mordechai Breuer (1918–2007); Ursula Breuer (1919–2006); Tzipora (Tzip) Breuer (1926-2020); Simeon Breuer (1922–1943)
- Parents: Solomon Breuer (father); Sophie Hirsch (mother)

Religious life
- Religion: Judaism

Isaac Breuer (Hebrew: יצחק ברויאר; 1883–1946) was a rabbi in the German Neo-Orthodoxy movement of his maternal grandfather Samson Raphael Hirsch, and was the first president of Poalei Agudat Yisrael.

== Biography ==
Isaac Breuer was born in Pápa, Austria-Hungary to Salomon Breuer, and lived most of his years in Frankfurt. His brother was Rabbi Joseph Breuer. He attended Hirsch's Realschule school, and received rabbinical ordination at age 20 from his father's yeshivah. He studied law, jurisprudence, and philosophy at Marburg University, and until 1936 practiced law in Frankfurt.

In 1936 Breuer immigrated to Jerusalem, where he led Poalei Agudat Yisrael and represented it before the Peel and Anglo American Commissions. He married Jenny Eisenmann, a granddaughter of Eliezer Liepman Philip Prins. His five children were Jacob (Bub), a lawyer who played a role in the Eichmann trial (1915–2008), Mordechai (1918–2007), Ursula (1919–2006, married Hermann Merkin), Tzipora (Tzip) Breuer Schneller Meir (1926–2020) and Simeon Breuer (1922–1943). His son-in-law Hermann Merkin helped to establish the Isaac Breuer College of Hebraic Studies (IBC program) at Yeshiva University in his memory.

Breuer died in Jerusalem, Mandatory Palestine in 1946. Michal Lupolianski, the wife of former mayor of Jerusalem Uri Lupolianski, is one of his grandchildren.

== Views on Zionism ==
Although Hirsch's neo-Orthodoxy movement had defined itself from the start largely as an opposition to the German Reform movement, Isaac Breuer already regarded the Reform movement of his day as essentially the impotent and dying remnant of the Haskalah (Biemann 2000). Breuer saw the real enemy of Orthodoxy in both political Zionism and Religious Zionism, which he considered especially dangerous because it possessed an authentic Jewish instinct and impulse. The goals of the Zionists paralleled the goals of his own Agudah organization in many areas ("reunification of land and nation"), but without the stress which Agudah laid on adherence to halachah and tradition (Biemann 2000). Indeed, Breuer envisioned a Messianic Torah state in the land of Israel, and could not abide the idea of "reunification of land and nation" coming to pass through the agency of secular Zionist forces in the form of a secular state.

== Published works ==
- Judenproblem (1918), a polemic against the perceived opponents of Orthodoxy, Zionists and Reform Jews.
- Messiasspuren (1918)
- Concepts of Judaism Levinger, Jacob S. (ed.)
- Der Neue Kusari (Translated into Hebrew by his son Professor Mordechai Breur as Hakuzari Hachadash
- Moriah
- Nachliel
- Das Judische Nationalheim von Isaac Breuer, (1925) Frankfurt AM, Verlag J kauffmann
- Jerusalem: eine historische Erzählung, a metaphor in novella form of what negative consequences might follow from the agenda of Zionists
- Mein Weg (1927)
- Isaac Breuer Werkausgabe, Vol. I, Frühe religionsphilosophische Schriften, Münster-Berlin 2017
- Isaac Breuer Werkausgabe, Vol. II. Schriften zum Zionismus und Agudismus, Münster-Berlin 2018
- Isaac Breuer Werkausgabe, Vol. III. Frühe literarische Texte, Munster-Berlin 2018
- Isaac Breuer Werkausgabe Vol. IV. Der Neue Kusari. Ein Weg zum Judentum, LIT, Münster 2020, 486 S.
