= Joseph Breuer =

American rabbi (1882–1980)

- Born: March 20, 1882; Pápa, Kingdom of Hungary
- Died: April 19, 1980 (aged 98); New York City, U.S.
- Spouse: Rika Eisenmann (m. 1911)
- Children: Marc Breuer (b. 1912)
- Parent(s): Solomon Breuer and Sophie Hirsch

Joseph Breuer, also known as Yosef Breuer (March 20, 1882 – April 19, 1980) was a rabbi and community leader in Germany and the United States. He was rabbi of one of the large Jewish synagogues founded by German-Jewish refugees fleeing Nazi oppression that had settled in Washington Heights, New York.

== Life and career ==
Joseph Breuer was born in 1882 in Pápa, Hungary, to the local rabbi Solomon Breuer and Sophie Breuer née Hirsch, who was the youngest daughter of Rabbi Samson Raphael Hirsch of Frankfurt am Main, Germany. After the passing of Hirsch in 1888, Solomon Breuer was elected his successor as rabbi of the Austrittsgemeinde (seceded community) of Orthodox Jews known as Khal Adath Jeshurun. Here, Breuer Sr. founded a yeshiva called the Torah Lehranstalt and became its first Rosh Yeshiva.

Joseph studied at the Torah Lehranstalt until 1903, when he was awarded semicha, and in 1905 he completed university studies at the University of Strasbourg with a PhD on the work of legal scholar Anselm von Feuerbach. He became a teacher at the Realschule (secondary school) and lecturer at the Torah Lehranstalt. He married Rika Eisenmann of Antwerp, granddaughter of Eliezer Liepman Philip Prins in 1911. In 1919 he was also appointed rabbi of the Klaus synagogue of Frankfurt.

Following Solomon Breuer's death, in 1926, Joseph Breuer succeeded him as Rosh Yeshiva which he practically had already been before his father's death. Joseph Jonah Horowitz succeeded Solomon Breuer as rabbi. In 1933, with the rise of Nazism, he briefly moved the yeshiva to Fiume, Italy, where he had assumed the rabbinate, but this arrangement lasted only until the next year and the family and the yeshiva returned to Frankfurt. It was formally dissolved by the Nazis in 1935, but continued to function unofficially. On the day after Kristallnacht, Breuer was arrested but subsequently released. The family left Germany, initially to Antwerp. A former pupil was then, with the assistance of Bernard Revel, able to procure an affidavit of support, which enabled Breuer and his family to relocate to New York in 1939. Bernard Revel offered Joseph Breuer a teaching position in his institution, which he brusquely turned down. He reportedly said that he would rather "clean the streets".

In New York, Breuer took the initiative to start a congregation with the numerous German refugees in Washington Heights, which would closely follow the morale and customs of its "spiritual ancestor" in Frankfurt. The congregation came to be called Khal Adath Yeshurun (KAJ), but is colloquially called "Breuer's" after its founder. In addition, he founded Yeshiva Rabbi Samson Raphael Hirsch, a yeshiva elementary school and high school named after his illustrious grandfather. It was the first such school in the area that used the vernacular. He also founded a teachers' seminary for women that would be renamed the Rika Breuer Teachers' Seminary after his wife's death. All institutions purported to follow the teachings and ideology of Breuer's grandfather Hirsch. In 1958, the community invited Frankfurt-born Shimon Schwab, then of Baltimore, to assist with rabbinical duties.

Towards the end of his life, the name Levi was added to his own name as a blessing to recover from an illness. He died in 1980, survived by his children Marc, Jacob, Samson, Rosy Bondi, Edith Silverman, Sophie Gutmann, Hanna Schwalbe and Meta Bechhofer.

== Views and philosophy ==
Breuer was well known for his involvement in setting up an Orthodox Jewish infrastructure in post-World War II America. He wrote several books, including translations of and commentaries on the Biblical books of Jeremiah and Ezekiel; English translations of these appeared after his death.

Breuer can be considered the main post-war representative of the Torah im Derech Eretz movement in the United States. Apart from the above-mentioned books, he limited his written work to contributions to the community organ (Mitteilungen); some appeared in book form after his death. His influence was mainly due to his public speeches and his indefatigable work on the community's services. A number of important ideas can be distinguished:

- Independent Orthodoxy: Breuer drew on his grandfather's work of Austritt - the principle that Jewish communities can only truly claim to be Jewish if they are ideologically and otherwise independent from organizations that represent ideals contrary to halakha. In America, where the community organization was not enforced by local law, this became in Breuer's mind an even stronger issue than in Europe. This stance also led to his involvement with Agudath Israel of America. He was stridently opposed to a Zionist state, and refrained from visiting Israel.
- Torah im Derech Eretz: Breuer saw the risk of misinterpretation of his grandfather's ideas on how Judaism could be harmonised within limits with general culture of the outside world. He repeatedly stated that compromising on Jewishness and halakha was at variance with Torah im Derech Eretz. With the rise of the yeshiva movement, he also remarked that Torah im Derech Eretz was by no means a unique temporary measure - as was often claimed by protagonists of the "Torah only" view.
- Kosher ve-Yosher: Although one of the phenomena of post-World War II Orthodoxy has become the (re)introduction of stringencies in halakha, Breuer held that these should not be limited to the ceremonial sphere but also to the many financial and social laws of Judaism. He would, for example, refuse a hechsher to companies with bad financial records.
