= Khal Adath Jeshurun =

Synagogue in Manhattan, New York

- קהל עדת ישורון
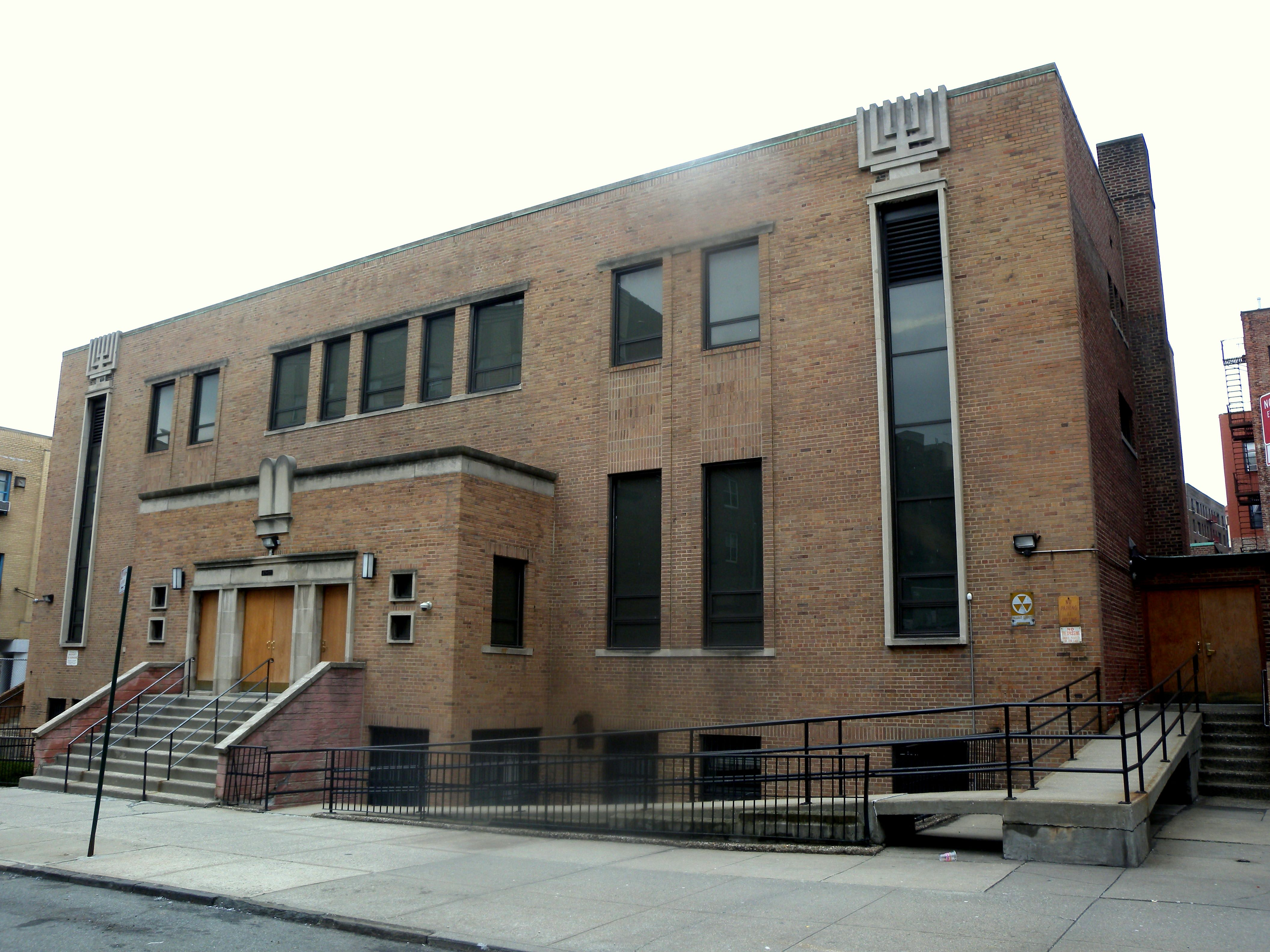
- Khal Adath Jeshurun synagogue in 2011

- Location in New York City

Religion
- Affiliation: Orthodox Judaism
- Rite: Western Nusach Ashkenaz
- Ecclesiastical or organisational status: Synagogue
- Leadership: Rabbi Liron Rogovsky
- Status: Active

Location
- Location: 85-93 Bennett Avenue, Washington Heights, Manhattan, New York City, New York 10033
- Country: United States
- Coordinates: 40°51′12″N 73°56′07″W

Architecture
- Founder: Rabbi Dr. Joseph Breuer
- Established: 1939 (as a community)
- Completed: 1952

Website
- kajinc.org

Khal Adath Jeshurun, officially K'hal Adath Jeshurun, abbreviated as KAJ, is an Orthodox Jewish community and synagogue located at 85-93 Bennett Avenue in the Washington Heights neighborhood of Manhattan in New York City, New York, United States.

The community includes a high proportion of Ashkenazi German Jews and follows the Western Ashkenazic rite, unlike most Ashkenazic synagogues in the United States, that follow the Eastern Ashkenazic (Polish) liturgical rite. The Western Ashkenazic rite covers the community's liturgical text, practices, and melodies. The community uses the Rödelheim Siddur Sfas Emes edited by Wolf Heidenheim and Seligman Baer, although the community's rite varies in some places from Rödelheim.

The community has an affiliated synagogue in the heavily Orthodox Jewish community of Monsey.

== History ==
The community is a direct continuation of the pre-Second World War Jewish community of Frankfurt am Main led by Samson Raphael Hirsch. Khal Adath Jeshurun bases its approach, and structure, on Hirsch's philosophy of Torah im Derech Eretz; it was re-established according to the protocol originally drawn in 1850, to which the community continues to adhere.

K'hal Adath Jeshurun was founded in 1939 in Washington Heights by refugees from Germany, following Kristallnacht. The community is colloquially called "Breuer's" after Rabbi Dr. Joseph Breuer, founder of the community and its first rabbi. He was a grandson of Samson Raphael Hirsch.

The current synagogue building was completed in 1952, renovating initial premises at 90 Bennett Avenue.

== Full service community ==
True to the "full-service community" as originally established in Frankfurt, the community includes a synagogue, an elementary school (located at 85 Bennett Avenue), various educational facilities, a social hall, a boys high school, and a kollel. It formerly included a girls high school, a post-high school girls seminary, and a post high school Beth Midrash program. The Kehilla also offers its members a mikveh, Kashrut supervision and Shechitah. The yeshivas go under the name Yeshiva Rabbi Samson Raphael Hirsch. It also offers an independent Chevra kadisha. The members of the community tend to live in the buildings on Bennett Avenue, Overlook Terrace, and the adjacent cross streets towards the west and Fort Washington Avenue.

== Senior rabbis ==
- Rabbi Joseph Breuer (1939 – 1980): founded the community and led it until his death.
- Rabbi Shimon Schwab (1958 – 1995): joined the community in 1958, and served as senior rabbi from 1980 until his death.
- Rabbi Zechariah Gelley (1987 – 2018): joined the community in 1987, and served as senior rabbi from 1995 until his death.
- Rabbi Yisroel Mantel, previously of Lucerne, Switzerland, joined the community in 2006, and became senior rabbi when Rabbi Gelley died in 2018.
- Rabbi Liron Rogovsky, previously of Monsey, New York, and a talmid of Yeshivas Ner Yisroel of Baltimore and Yeshivas Mir Yerushalayim was elected as the Senior Rabbi in late May 2026, as Rabbi Mantel had announced that in October 2025 that he would seek to be the Rabbi of the community of Gateshead, England and was elected the Rabbi of that community in December 2025.

== Gallery ==
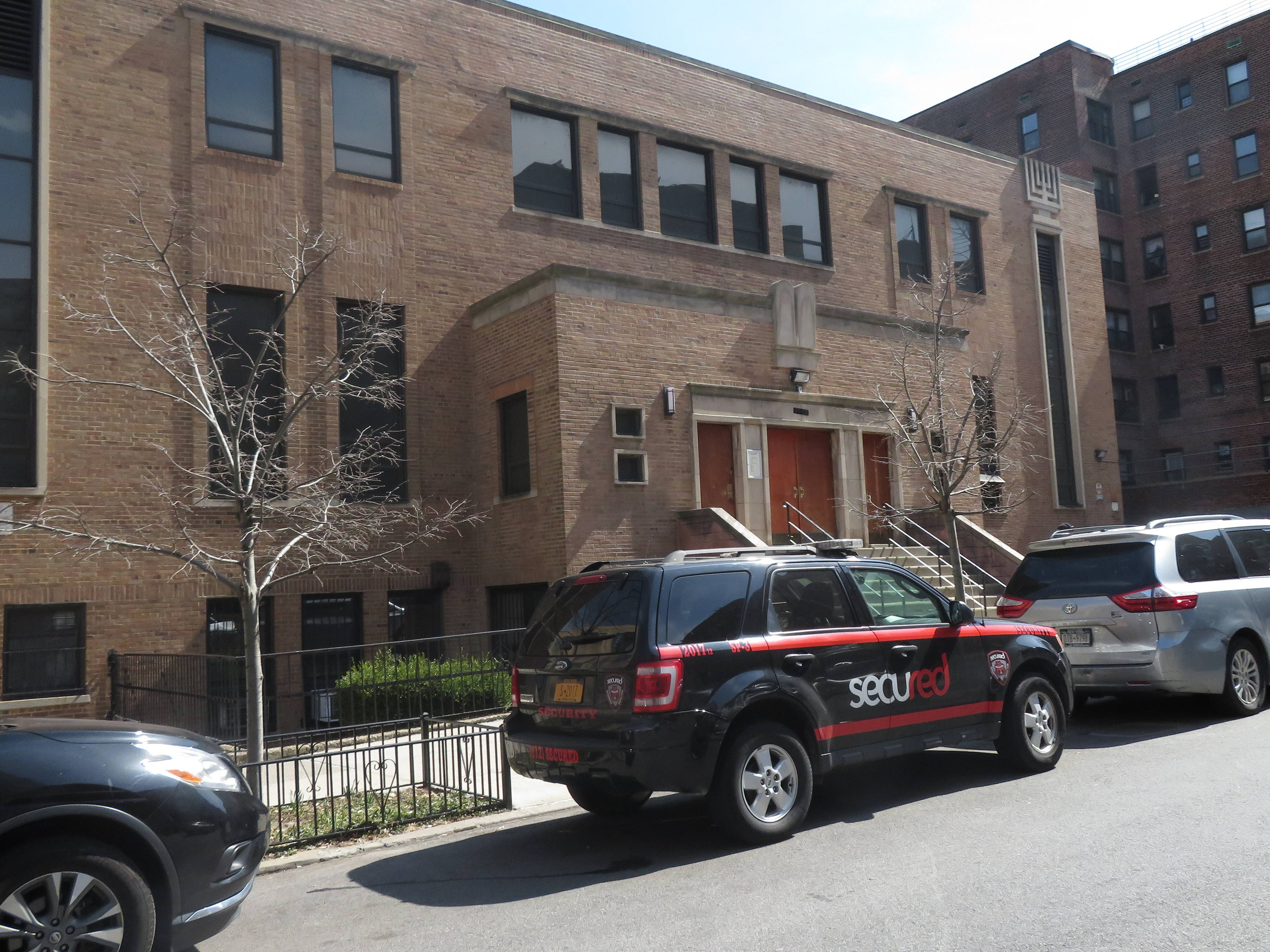
Synagogue

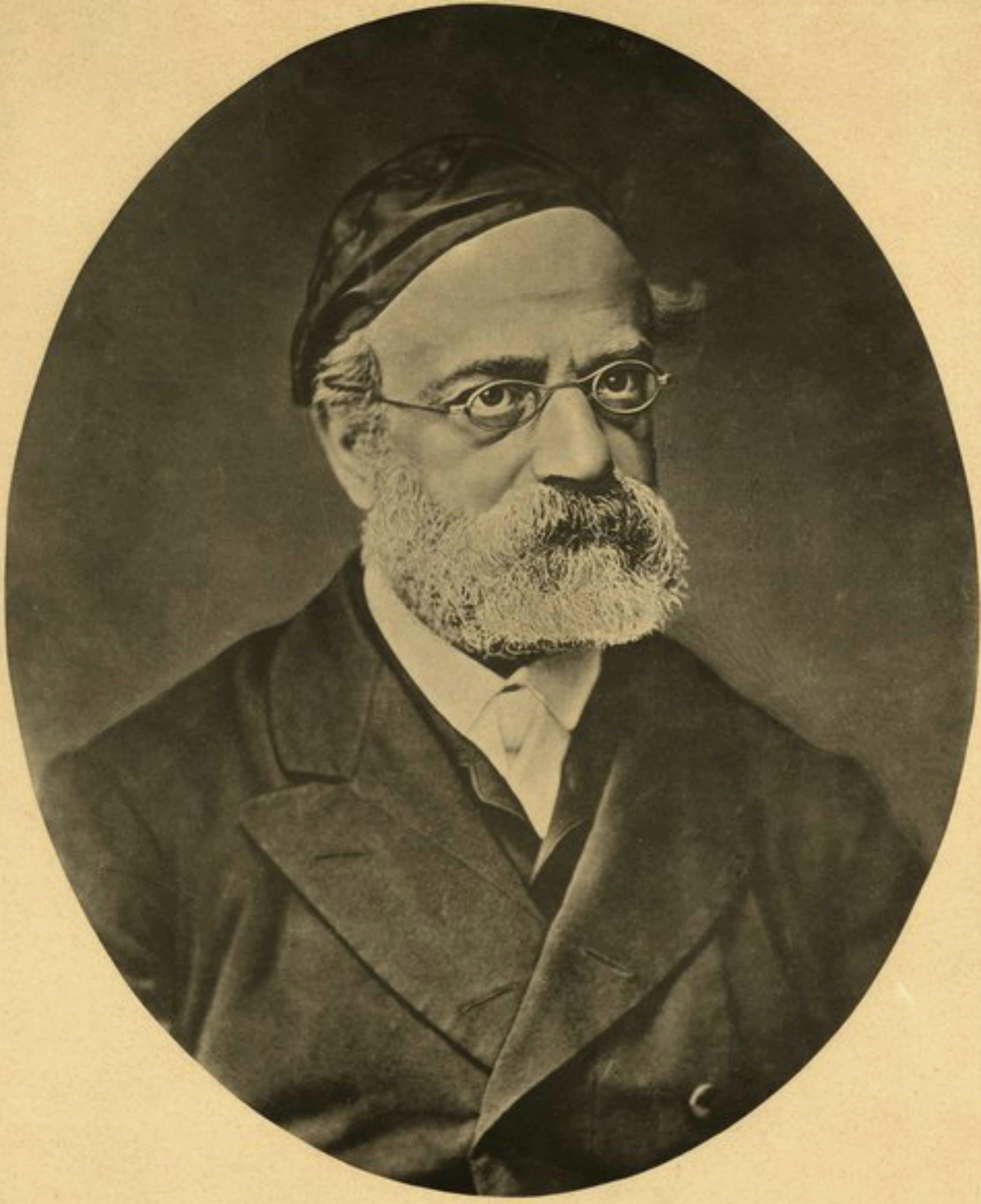
Rabbi Samson Raphael Hirsch

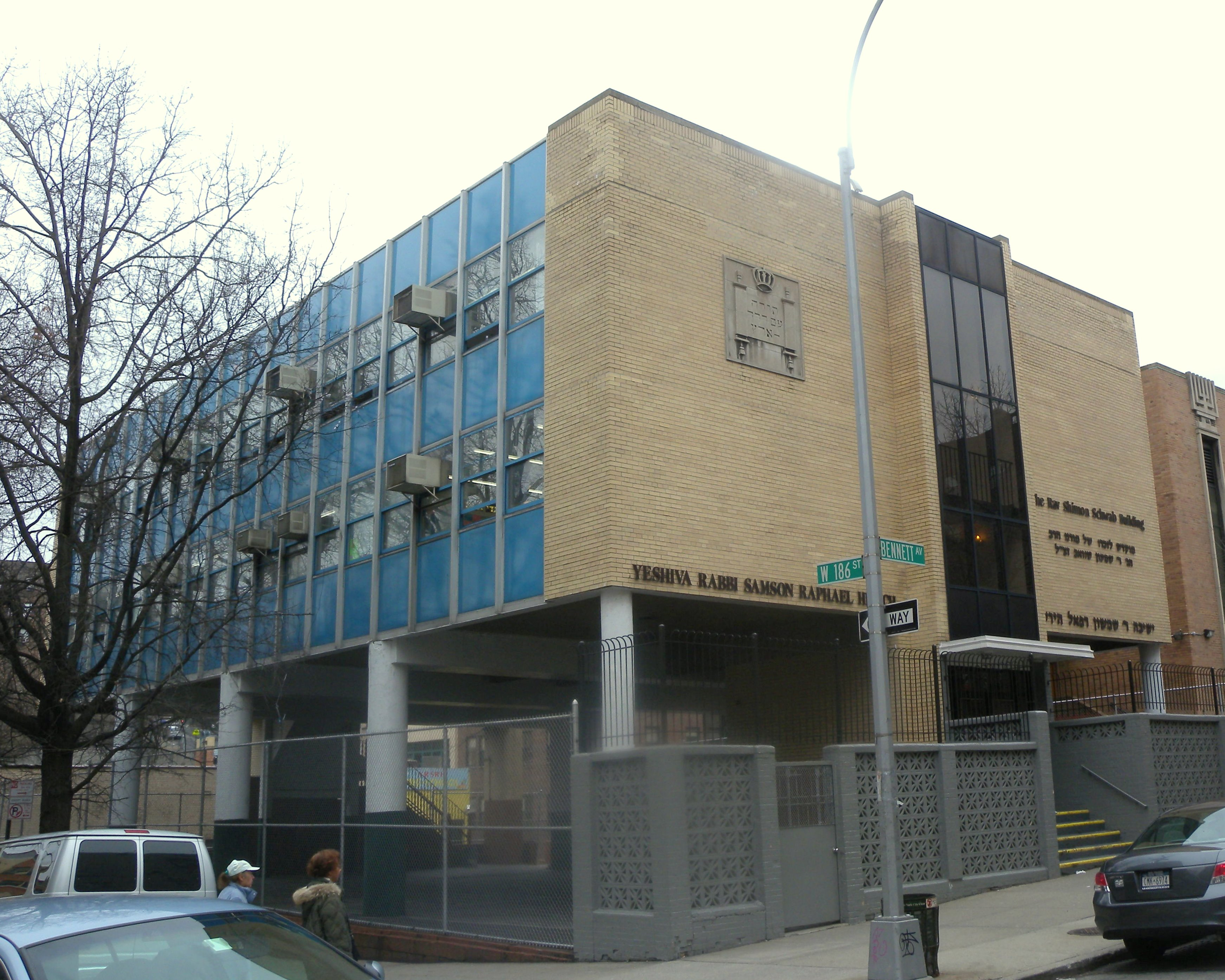
186th Street school

== See also ==
- Yekke
- Torah Lehranstalt
