= Solomon Breuer =

Hungarian-German rabbi (1850–1926)

Personal life
- Born: Shlomo Zalman Breuer; 27 June 1850 Pilisvörösvár, Hungary, Austria
- Died: 17 July 1926 (aged 76) Frankfurt, Hesse-Nassau, Germany
- Spouse: Sophie Hirsch (m. 1876)
- Children: Joseph Breuer; Isaac Breuer; Samson Breuer; Raphael Breuer

Religious life
- Religion: Judaism

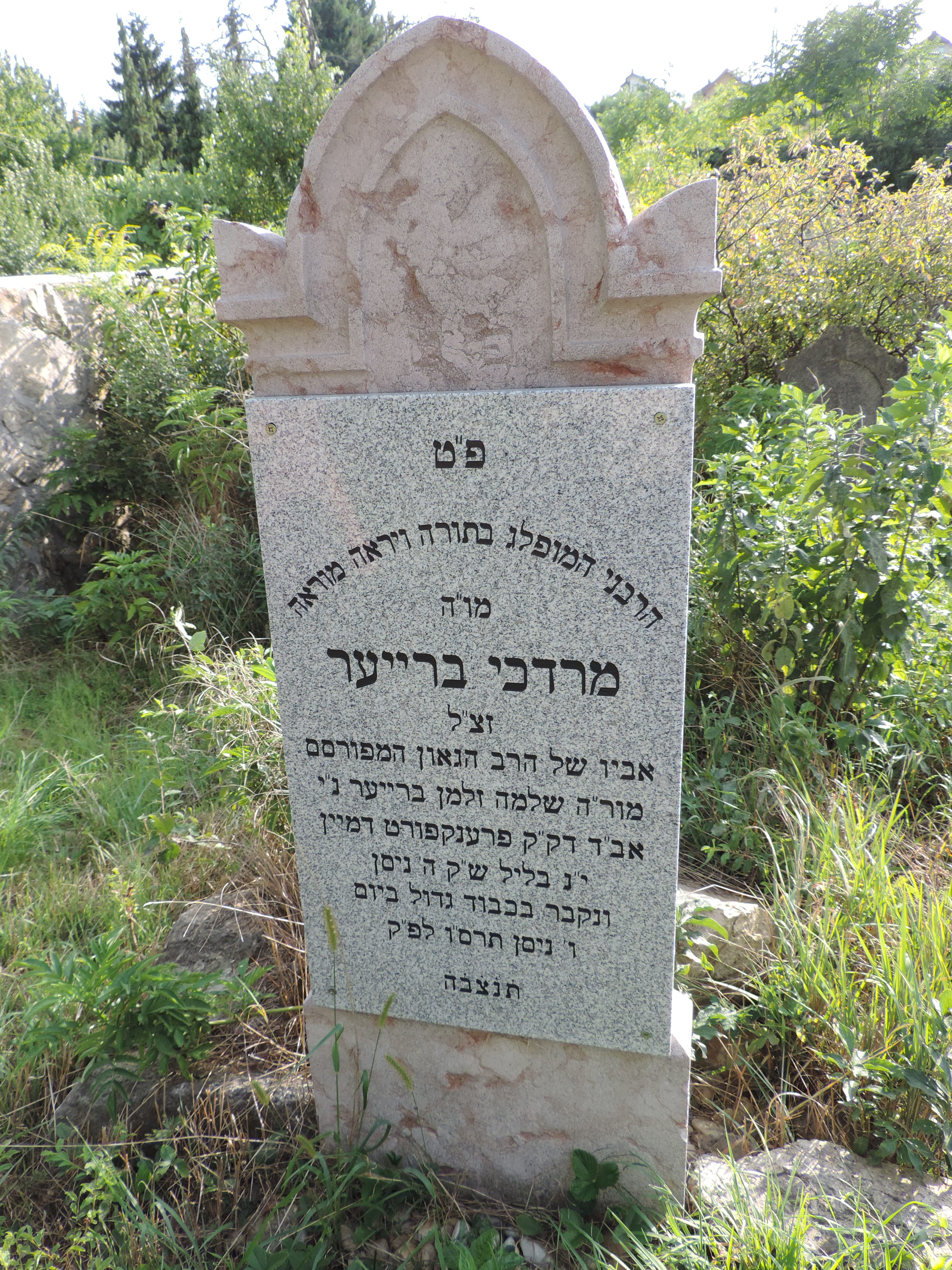
Solomon Breuer's father gravestone in Pilisvörösvár

Solomon (Shlomo Zalman) Breuer (27 June 1850 – 17 July 1926) was a Hungarian-born German rabbi, initially in Pápa, Hungary, and from the early 1890s in Frankfurt as a successor of his father-in-law Samson Raphael Hirsch.

== Life and work ==
Solomon Breuer was born in Pilisvörösvár, Hungary, into a family of German-speaking merchants. He studied with his maternal grandfather rabbi Simon Wiener. At the age of twelve he entered the yeshiva of Nitra, but returned to study with his grandfather until he could enroll in the Pressburg Yeshiva, then headed by Rabbi Samuel Benjamin Sofer (the Ksav Sofer). He then proceeded to university studies and eventual doctorate in Mainz, where he became acquainted with rabbi Marcus Lehmann, one of the leaders of German Orthodoxy.

Breuer married Sophie, youngest daughter of rabbi Samson Raphael Hirsch of Frankfurt, in 1876, and soon after accepted the rabbinate of Pápa in Hungary. His father-in-law died in December 1888, and Breuer succeeded him as the rabbi of the Frankfurt Austrittsgemeinde (secessioned community) in 1890.

In Frankfurt he participated in the Freie Vereinigung, a national organisation of Orthodox communities, and created its rabbinical representative body, the Verband der orthodoxen Rabbiner Deutschlands (Union of Orthodox rabbis in Germany). He would later also be one of the founding members of Agudas Yisroel, and strongly opposed political Zionism; he viewed participation in the Zionist movement as an implicit approval of the idea that a Jewish state can replace Jewish religious identity.

As part of his efforts to foster Jewish education in Frankfurt, Breuer opened a yeshiva, the Torah Lehranstalt, in 1893, which he modeled after the yeshivot he had attended in Hungary.

Little of Breuer's work remains in writing. Collected sermons were published in English under the title Chochmo u'Mussar in three volumes between 1972 and 1977 by his grandson Jacob Breuer, and some of his responsa appeared in the Hebrew volume Divrei Yosef, which mainly contained the work of his son Joseph.

Breur had eight children. Simon died in childhood. Raphael Breuer was rabbi in Aschaffenburg, Joseph Breuer taught at the Torah Lehranstalt and recreated the Frankfurt community in 1940's New York, Isaac Breuer was an ideologue of Agudat Yisrael, Moses Breuer was a linguist, Samson Breuer a mathematician and actuary, and Joshua Breuer a pediatrician. His daughter Hannah Breuer married Edmund Meyer, a lawyer in Cologne. Breuer died in Frankfurt.
