= Röttingen =

- Town
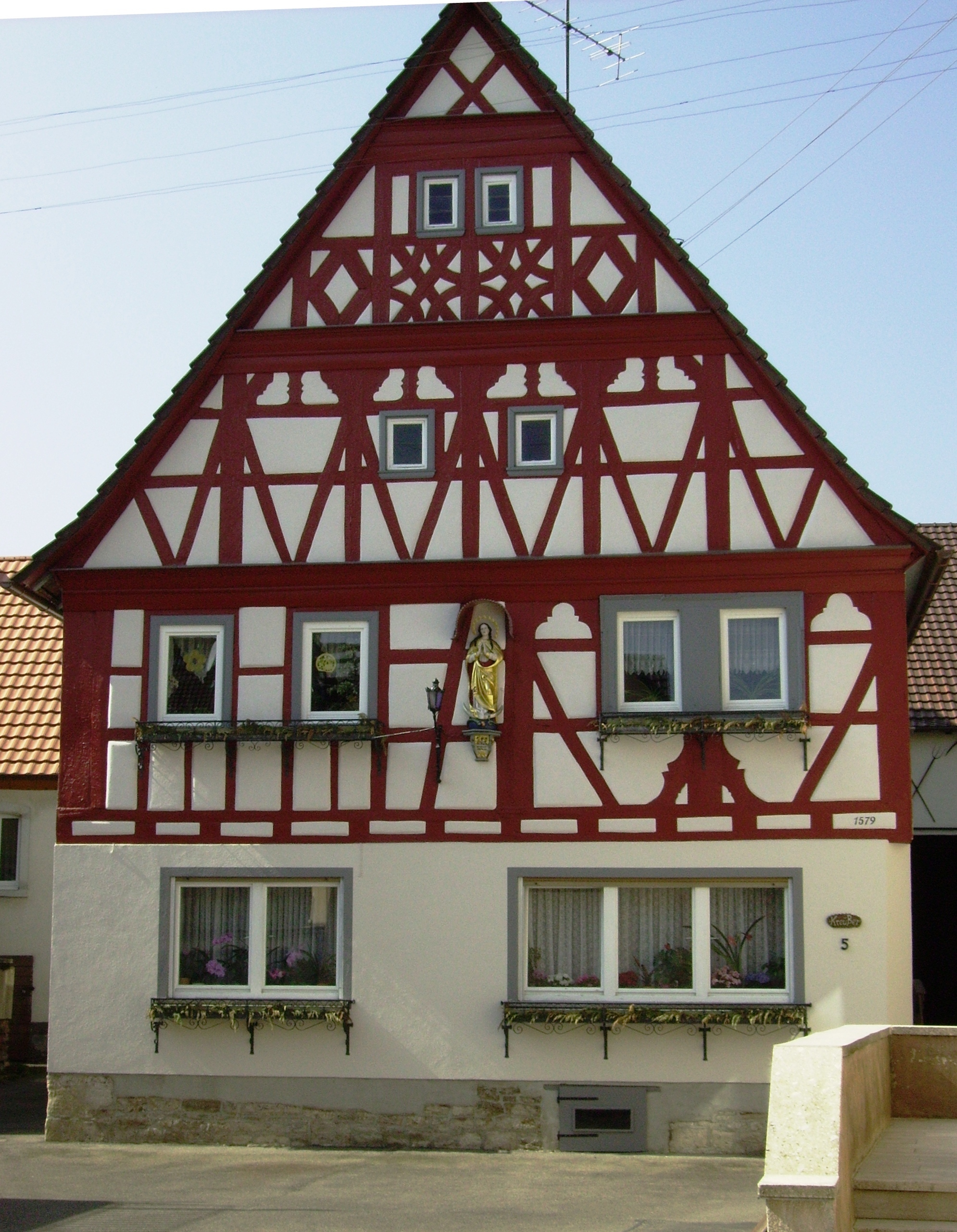
- Franconian fachwerkhaus in Röttingen

- Coat of arms

- Location of Röttingen within Würzburg district
- Interactive map of Röttingen
- Location within Germany Location within Bavaria
- Coordinates: 49°30′N 9°58′E
- Country: Germany
- State: Bavaria
- Admin. region: Unterfranken
- District: Würzburg
- Municipal assoc.: Röttingen
- Subdivisions: 3 Stadtteile

Government
  - Mayor (2020–26): Hermann Gabel

Area
  - Total: 27.21 km^{2} (10.51 sq mi)
- Elevation: 243 m (797 ft)

Population (2025-12-31)
  - Total: 1,687
  - Density: 62.00/km^{2} (160.6/sq mi)
- Time zone: UTC+01:00 (CET)
  - Summer (DST): UTC+02:00 (CEST)
- Postal codes: 97285
- Dialling codes: 09338
- Vehicle registration: WÜ
- Website: www.roettingen.de

Röttingen (German pronunciation: [ˈʁœtɪŋən]) is a town in the district of Würzburg, in Bavaria, Germany. It is situated 30 kilometres (19 mi) south of Würzburg, and 15 kilometres (9 mi) east of Bad Mergentheim.

== Geography ==
=== Climate ===
The valley of Tauber is one of the driest areas in Bavaria and belongs to the continental, dry and warm type of climate with very little of rain. There are more than 30 days every year when the temperature is above 25 °C (77 °F) and fewer than 10 days every year where the temperature is below 0 °C (32 °F).

=== Subdivisions ===
The town is divided into the sections of Aufstetten, Röttingen, and Strüth.

== History ==
The Alemannic tribe of the "Ruoter" (Ruotingen = Röttingen) probably settled first on this place in the late 5th century. The oldest documents in the town date back to 1103, and the town privilege was given in 1275.

In 1298 the town was the scene of the Rintfleisch massacres, when a certain "Lord Rintfleisch", accusing the town's Jews of having obtained and desecrated a consecrated host, gathered a mob around him and burned the Jews of Röttingen on April 20, 1298.

Röttingen belonged then to the area of Hohenlohe and later changed to the Hochstift of the Bishop of Würzburg. From the 14th century on it was the residence of a local authority of the bishop.

The German Peasants' War in 1525 abruptly stopped economic development. The long reign of Bishop Julius Echter von Mespelbrunn over the town brought back the prosperity of the community mainly based on the production and trade of wine.

During the Thirty Years' War (1618–1648), Röttingen experienced a lot of turmoil since the army of King Gustavus Adolphus of Sweden was fighting in the Tauber valley. The wars in the 16th and 17th centuries destroyed all the economic prosperity of the town and their inhabitants.

When Napoleon and his forces arrived in the town, he brought the Franconian "Kleinstaaterei" to an abrupt end. In the following years, all clerical property was dissolved and Röttingen joined the Bavarian region of Untermainkreis.

The royal Bavarian administration in 1837 divided Franconia into Upper, Middle, and Lower Franconia as it exists nowadays.

== Demographics ==
In 1970, there were 1,988 inhabitants in Röttingen. In 1987, this figure decreased to 1,733, and in 2000 there was a slight increase to 1,789 people. As of December 2006, there are 1,663 people living in the town.

95% of the town is Roman Catholic. Another 3% of the town is Evangelical. Other religions and denominations constitute 2% of the population.

== Politics ==
The mayor of Röttingen is Hermann Gabel, elected in March 2020.

Röttingen is the seat of a Verwaltungsgemeinschaft (municipal association) with the following member municipalities: Bieberehren, Riedenheim, Röttingen, Tauberrettersheim.

The municipality maintains a partnership with Bad Mitterndorf, Styria, Austria.

=== Municipal council ===
Total: 12 seats

Election from 2 March 2008:

- CSU/Freie Bürger: 9 seats
- Unabhängige Bürger Röttingen (UBR): 3 seats

== Economy and infrastructure ==
Röttingen is a wine-producing community in the Tauber Valley. Vineyards covering about 30 hectares (74 acres) produce grapes made into Frankonian wine on the "Röttinger Feuerstein": 70% is Müller-Thurgau, 20% Silvaner; 10% is Riesling, Traminer, Kerner, Scheurebe, Bacchus, Schwarzriesling, etc. A local speciality is the "Tauberschwarz". This traditional variety of grape is cultivated only in the area of the Tauber Valley.

== Literature ==
- Hartmut Eichinger: Set of illustrated books - Röttingen im Zeitenlauf -

Book 1: Burg Brattenstein, Erste Burgfestpiele, Europastadt, Röttingen 2017, 48 pages, b/w;
Book 2: Leben und Arbeiten, Röttingen 2018, 72 pages, b/w;
Book 3: Historische Daten, Bauten und Bilder, Röttingen 2018, 104 pages, b/w;
Book 4: Personen, Kirche, Vereine, Feste, Röttingen 2019, 104 pages, b/w;

(available at the tourist information Röttingen, at company |eibe.de| - Röttingen or from the author)

- Hartmut Eichinger: Chronik der Zimmererfamilie Eichinger Book about the time from 1448 with reports about 14 generations carpentering in Röttingen, Röttingen 2016 (available at company eibe.de - Röttingen or from the author)
- Hartmut Eichinger: Visionen für Kinder (Visions for children), an authors biography with reports about the rise of the fatherly carpentry firm to the international working company eibe, Röttingen 2017 (available at company eibe.de - Röttingen or from the author)
- Dr. Michael Wieland: Röttingen - Ein Beitrag zur Geschichte dieser Fränkischen Landstadt, Original Würzburg 1858, (in the archive of Hartmut Eichinger)
- Dr. Michael Wieland: Röttingen - vermehrter und verbesserter Beitrag zu einer Geschichte dieser Stadt, Original Würzburg 1904, Nachdruck durch H. Eichinger 1990 (available from the author)
