= Judith Grunfeld =

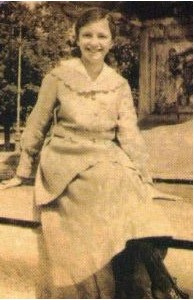
- Born: Judith Rosenbaum; 18 December 1902; Budapest, Austria-Hungary
- Died: 14 May 1998 (aged 95); London Borough of Hackney
- Education: Frankfurt University
- Occupation: head teacher
- Spouse: Isidor Grunfeld

Judith Grunfeld born Judith Rosenbaum (18 December 1902 – 14 May 1998) was a Hungarian born Jewish German teacher who spent much of her life in the United Kingdom. She was a pioneer of the revolutionary Bais Yaakov girl's education movement. She taught teachers in Poland and then led a Jewish school of girls, which was evacuated throughout the war to the small town of Shefford.

== Life ==
=== Germany and Poland ===
Grunfeld was born in Budapest in 1902, but she was educated and raised in Frankfurt where she attended the Hirsch Real Schule before going on to Frankfurt University.

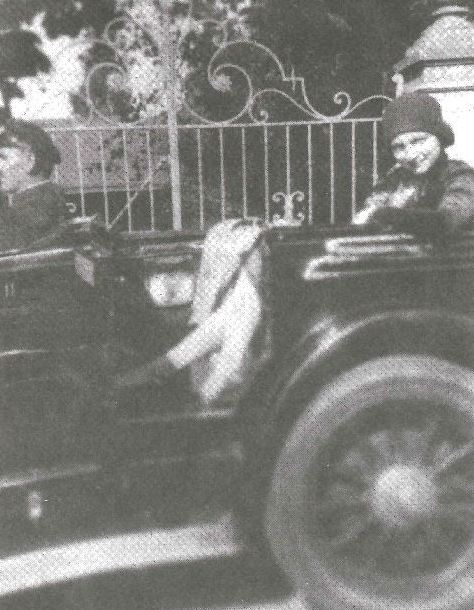
Judith Rosenbaum (later Grunfeld) on a fund raising trip for the school in Krakow

In 1924, Jacob Rosenheim of Agudat Yisrael persuaded Grunfeld to abandon her dreams of going to Palestine and instead to go to Krakow, Poland and join Sarah Schenirer's fledgling school that was trying to teach girls from Jewish backgrounds. Schenirer did not have an extensive Jewish education but she was to change the way that women were regarded within Jewish culture. They aimed to teach girls and their teachers and get them to appreciate their culture and religion. For five years from 1924 she was involved with teaching teachers at the Beit Yaakov teachers' Seminary. She also had to raise the funds and this would involve some travel. In 1929 the school was adopted by the Orthodox "Agudat Yisrael" now that Rabbi Jacob Rosenheim was its president.

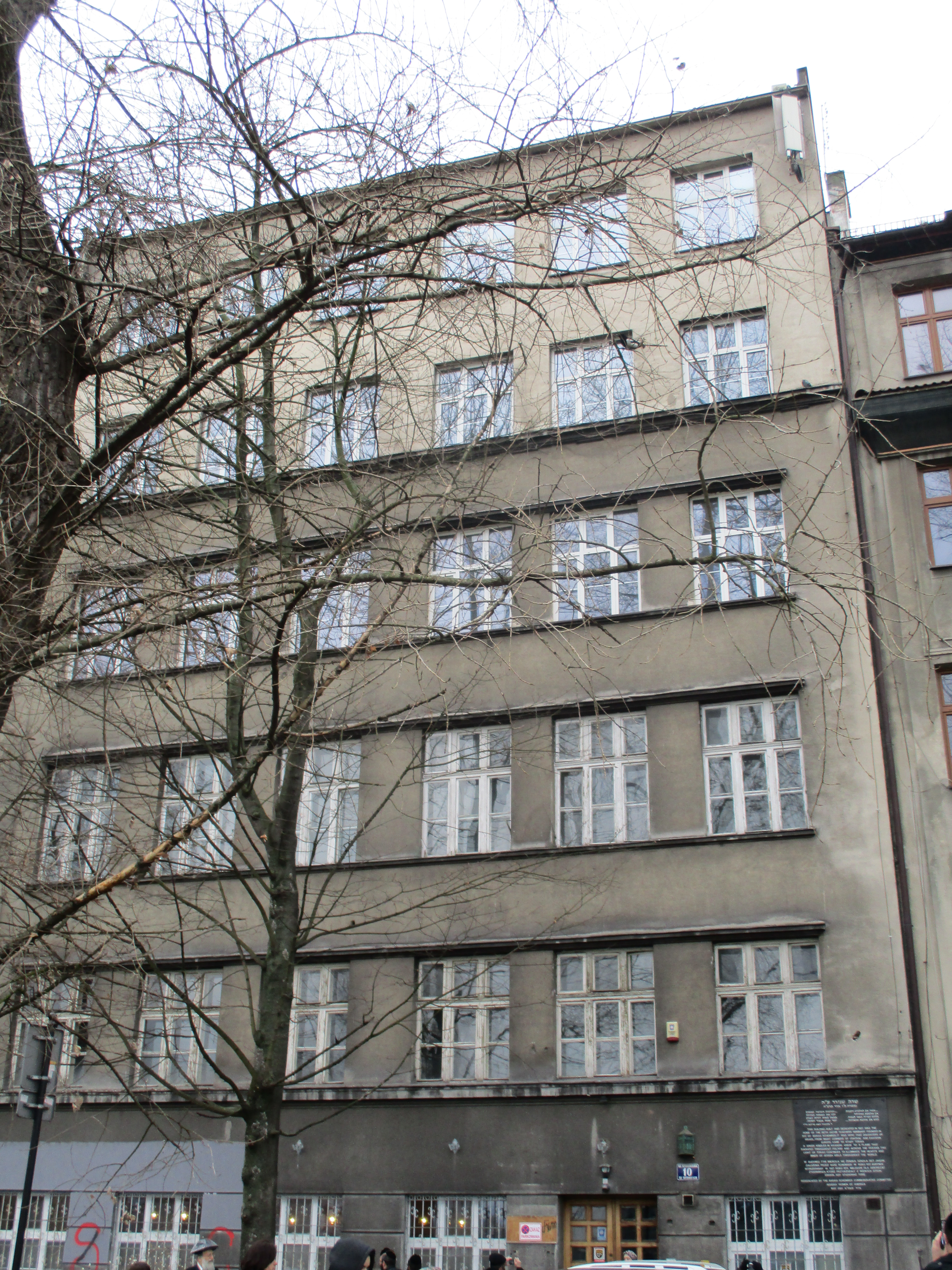
The Beit Yaakov teachers' Seminary in Kraków today

She married lawyer Isidor Grunfeld on 22 November 1932. He was a lawyer in Würzburg until 1933. The Nazis' rise to power prompted them to move to Israel, they moved to London in 1933 because they struggled to find work in Israel.

=== London ===
Grunfeld was employed at the girls' Jewish secondary school, and by 1934 she was the head teacher. The school had been running since 1917, but two years after she started, the board of education refused to recognise the school. Grunfeld's leadership led to improvements and new buildings were found for her school and the boys school. In 1938 to 1939 a large number of Jewish refugees arrived in the UK and Grunfeld's school gained a share and by the outbreak of war the school had 450 pupils.

During World War II, the whole school was evacuated north to the town of Shefford in rural Bedfordshire. The school was to remain in Shefford until 1945. She and her husband moved to Bedfordshire and her husband commuted to his job leading the Jewish court (London Beth Din). In 1943 their fourth child was born. In 1947 she was said to have surprised the school when she gave birth to her fifth and last child as no one was aware that she was pregnant.

In 1954 a heart attack led to her husband's early retirement from the London Beth Din, but he would continue to write. The following year Judith retired to start twenty years of caring for him, although she still gave talks internationally. He died in 1975.

In 1980 she published "Shefford: The Story of a Jewish School Community in Evacuation, 1939-1945", telling the story of her time leading the evacuated school.

== Death and legacy ==
Grunfeld died in London Borough of Hackney in 1998 and she was buried in Jerusalem beside her husband.

In 1994, Miriam Dansky, published Rebbetzin Grunfeld: The Life of Judith Grunfeld, Courageous Pioneer of the Bais Yaakov Movement and Jewish Rebirth. Miriam Stark Zakon credited Grunfeld as being a co-founder of the Bais Yaakov movement in her 2001 book The Queen of Bais Yaakov: The Story of Dr. Judith Grunfeld.
