= Röttingen (Verwaltungsgemeinschaft) =

- Verwaltungsgemeinschaft
- Location of Röttingen within Würzburg district
- Interactive map of Röttingen
- Location within Germany Location within Bavaria
- Coordinates: 49°31′N 9°58′E
- Country: Germany
- State: Bavaria
- Admin. region: Lower Franconia
- District: Würzburg
- Seat: Röttingen
- Subdivisions: 4 municipalities

Area
  - Total: 74.68 km^{2} (28.83 sq mi)

Population (2025-12-31)
  - Total: 4,075
  - Density: 54.57/km^{2} (141.3/sq mi)
- Time zone: UTC+01:00 (CET)
  - Summer (DST): UTC+02:00 (CEST)

Röttingen is a Verwaltungsgemeinschaft (municipal association) in the district of Würzburg in Bavaria, Germany. Its seat is in Röttingen.

It consists of the following municipalities:

1. Bieberehren
2. Riedenheim
3. Röttingen
4. Tauberrettersheim
