= Isidor Grunfeld =

- Born: Isidor Grunfeld; 1900; Tauberrettersheim, Bavaria
- Died: 8 September 1975 (aged 74–75); London Borough of Hackney
- Education: Frankfurt University
- Occupation: dayan
- Spouse: Judith Grunfeld

Isidor Grunfeld (1900–1975), also known by his Hebrew name Yeshaya Yishai ha-Kohen Grunfeld, was a dayan (rabbinical judge) and author who was associated with the London Beth Din (rabbinical court). He is best known for several popular works on Jewish law, and for his translations of the works of Samson Raphael Hirsch.

== Biography ==
Grunfeld was born in the Bavarian town Tauberrettersheim. He was one of his father's eleven children. His mother, Caroline, was his father, Joseph's, second wife. His father drove cattle and dealt in agricultural products. His parents were both descended from noted rabbis. He was educated in German yeshivot and acquired a legal degree after attending Frankfurt and Heidelberg universities between 1920 and 1925.

He married teacher and Bais Yaakov educator Dr Judith Rosenbaum on 22 November 1932. She had been encouraging the Jewish girls to aspire to a career in teaching. He worked as a lawyer in Würzburg until 1933, when the Nazis' rise to power prompted them to move, initially to Palestine and then to London. After initially working in the legal field, he underwent rabbinical training and became a member of the London Beth Din.

In 1954 a heart attack led to his early retirement from the London Beth Din. The following year his wife retired to start twenty years of caring for him. After retirement he published a number of books on Jewish law: on the Sabbath, kashrut (Jewish dietary laws), the laws of shmita and yovel (the Sabbatical year and Jubilee) and inheritance law. In addition, he translated some of the works of 19th century German-Jewish leader Samson Raphael Hirsch (1808–1888), namely Horeb and Judaism Eternal, and he wrote on the influence of Hirsch in Three Generations and the introduction to Horeb as well as an introduction to the translation of Hirsch's Torah commentary by Levy.

He died in 1975 and his wife Judith survived him until 1998.

== Bibliography ==
- Samson Raphael Hirsch (translated by Isidor Grunfeld). Judaism Eternal - Selected Essays From the Writings of Samson Raphael Hirsch, 1956. Judaism Eternal in libraries (WorldCat catalog)
- Isidor Grunfeld. Three Generations: The Influence of Samson Raphael Hirsch on Jewish Life and Thought. Jewish Post Publications, 1958. Three Generations in libraries (WorldCat catalog)
- Samson Raphael Hirsch (translated by Isidor Grunfeld). Horeb: A Philosophy of Jewish Laws and Observances. London: Soncino Press, 1962 [reprinted 2002]. ISBN 0-90068-940-4.
- Samson Raphael Hirsch (translated by Dr Isaac Levy, introduction by Isidor Grunfeld). Commentary on the Pentateuch. Judaica Press, 1962 [reissued 1989]. ISBN 0-91081-812-6.
- Isidor Grunfeld. The Jewish Dietary Laws. London: Soncino Press, 1972. ISBN 0-90068-922-6.
- Isidor Grunfeld. Shemittah & Yobel: Laws Referring to the Sabbatical Year in Israel and its Produce. London: Soncino Press, 1972. ISBN 0-90068-991-9.
- Isidor Grunfeld. Jewish Law of Inheritance. Feldheim, 1987. ISBN 0-87306-435-6.
