= Tauberrettersheim =

- Municipality
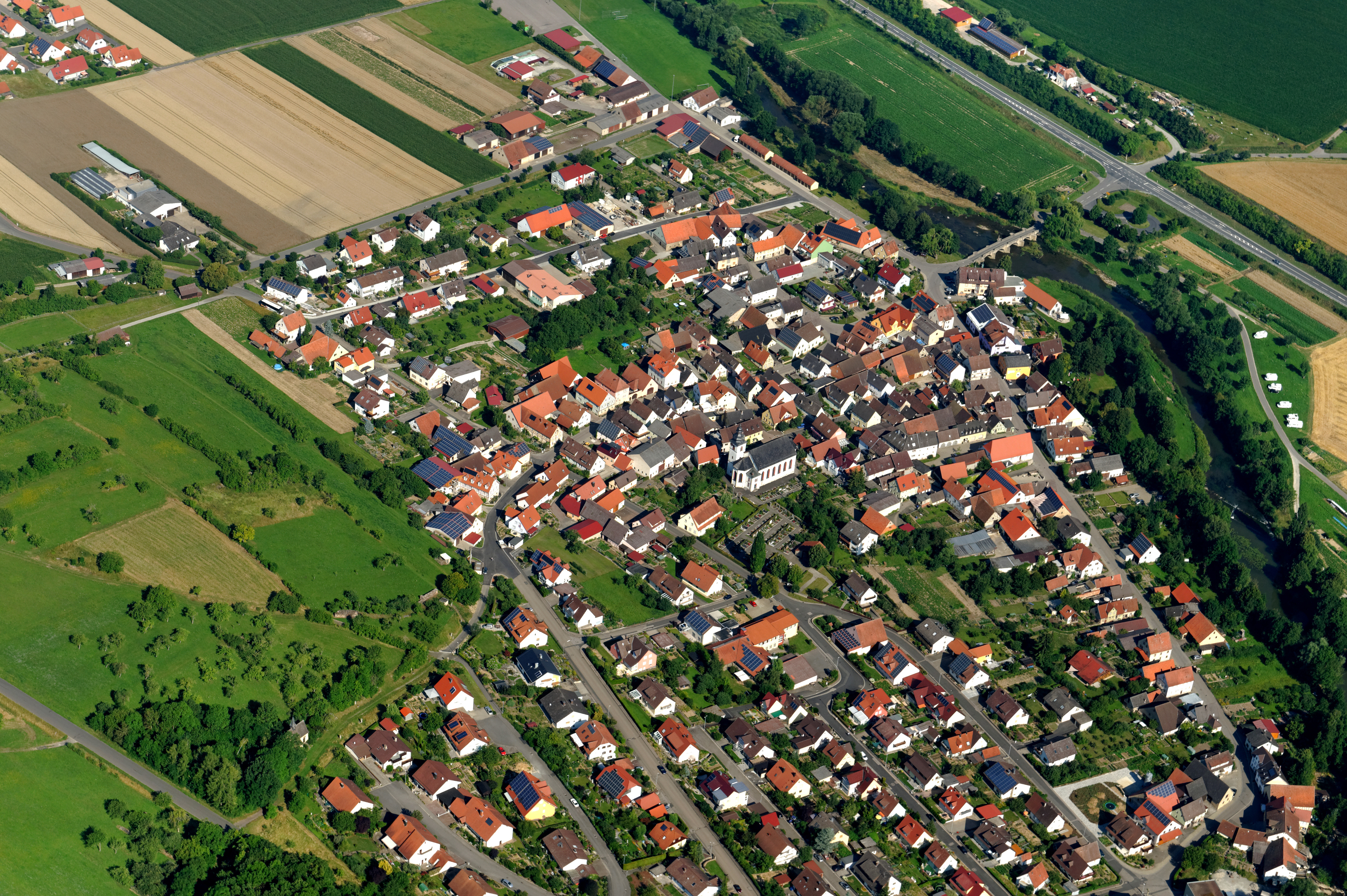
- Aerial view

- Coat of arms

- Location of Tauberrettersheim within Würzburg district
- Interactive map of Tauberrettersheim
- Location within Germany Location within Bavaria
- Coordinates: 49°29′40″N 9°56′12″E
- Country: Germany
- State: Bavaria
- Admin. region: Unterfranken
- District: Würzburg
- Municipal assoc.: Röttingen

Government
  - Mayor (2018–24): Katharina Fries

Area
  - Total: 8.56 km^{2} (3.31 sq mi)
- Elevation: 235 m (771 ft)

Population (2025-12-31)
  - Total: 799
  - Density: 93.3/km^{2} (242/sq mi)
- Time zone: UTC+01:00 (CET)
  - Summer (DST): UTC+02:00 (CEST)
- Postal codes: 97285
- Dialling codes: 09338
- Vehicle registration: WÜ
- Website: www.tauberrettersheim.de

Tauberrettersheim is a municipality in the district of Würzburg in Bavaria, Germany. It lies on the river Tauber.

== Notable residents ==
- Isidor Grunfeld, 1900–1975; Rabbi
