= Bieberehren =

- Municipality
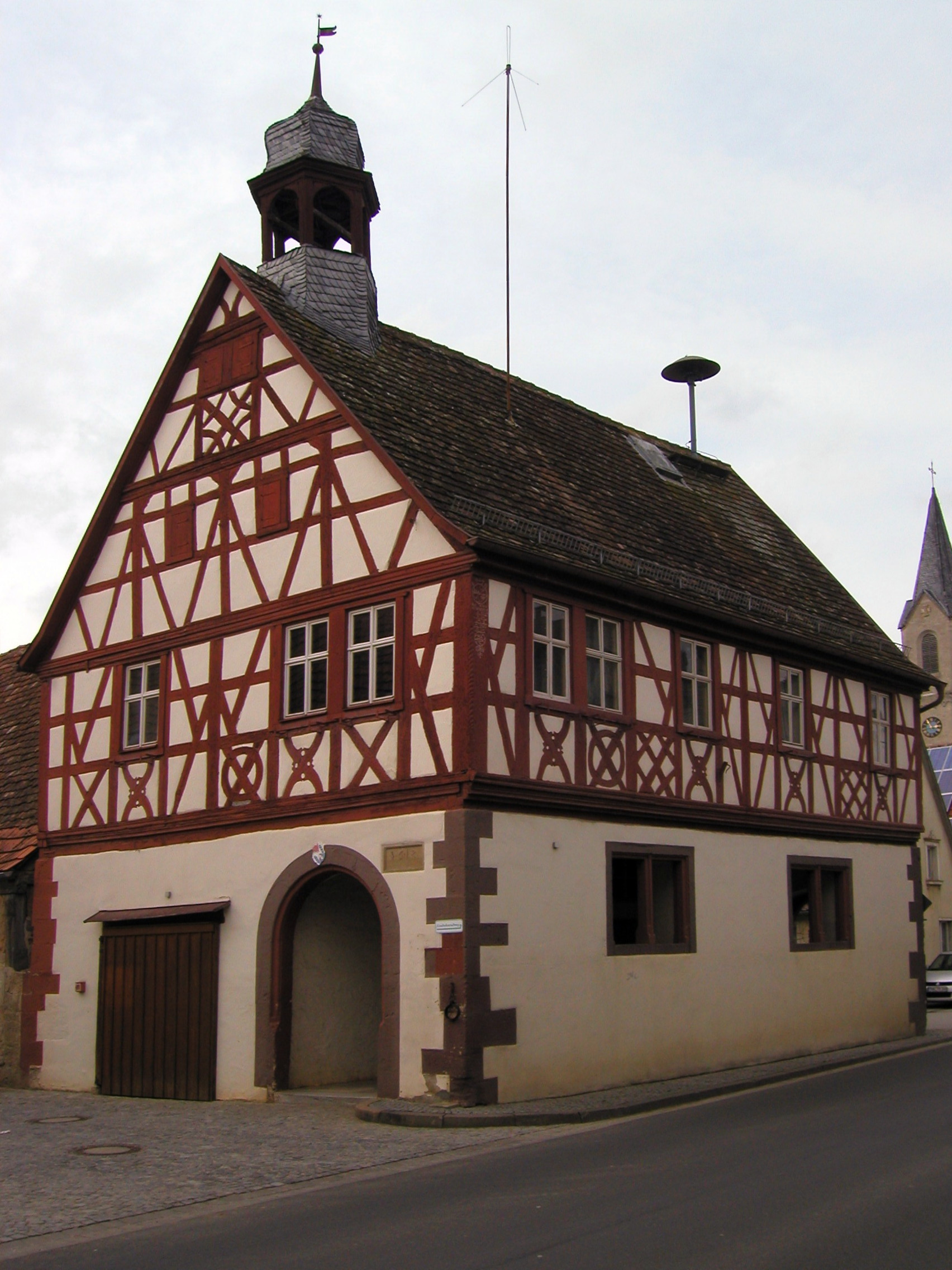
- Town hall

- Coat of arms

- Location of Bieberehren within Würzburg district
- Interactive map of Bieberehren
- Location within Germany Location within Bavaria
- Coordinates: 49°30′56″N 10°0′28″E
- Country: Germany
- State: Bavaria
- Admin. region: Unterfranken
- District: Würzburg
- Municipal assoc.: Röttingen

Government
  - Mayor (2020–26): Engelbert Zobel (FW)

Area
  - Total: 14.83 km^{2} (5.73 sq mi)
- Elevation: 248 m (814 ft)

Population (2025-12-31)
  - Total: 850
  - Density: 57/km^{2} (150/sq mi)
- Time zone: UTC+01:00 (CET)
  - Summer (DST): UTC+02:00 (CEST)
- Postal codes: 97243
- Dialling codes: 09338
- Vehicle registration: WÜ
- Website: www.bieberehren.de

Bieberehren is a municipality in the district of Würzburg in Bavaria, Germany. It lies on the river Tauber.
