= Riedenheim =

- Municipality
- Coat of arms

- Location of Riedenheim within Würzburg district
- Interactive map of Riedenheim
- Location within Germany Location within Bavaria
- Coordinates: 49°33′N 9°59′E
- Country: Germany
- State: Bavaria
- Admin. region: Unterfranken
- District: Würzburg
- Municipal assoc.: Röttingen

Government
  - Mayor (2020–26): Edwin Fries

Area
  - Total: 23.99 km^{2} (9.26 sq mi)
- Elevation: 313 m (1,027 ft)

Population (2025-12-31)
  - Total: 739
  - Density: 30.8/km^{2} (79.8/sq mi)
- Time zone: UTC+01:00 (CET)
  - Summer (DST): UTC+02:00 (CEST)
- Postal codes: 97283
- Dialling codes: 09338
- Vehicle registration: WÜ
- Website: www.riedenheim.de

Riedenheim is a municipality in the district of Würzburg in Bavaria, Germany.
