= Untermainkreis =

- Regierungsbezirk of the Kingdom of Bavaria
- 1817–1837
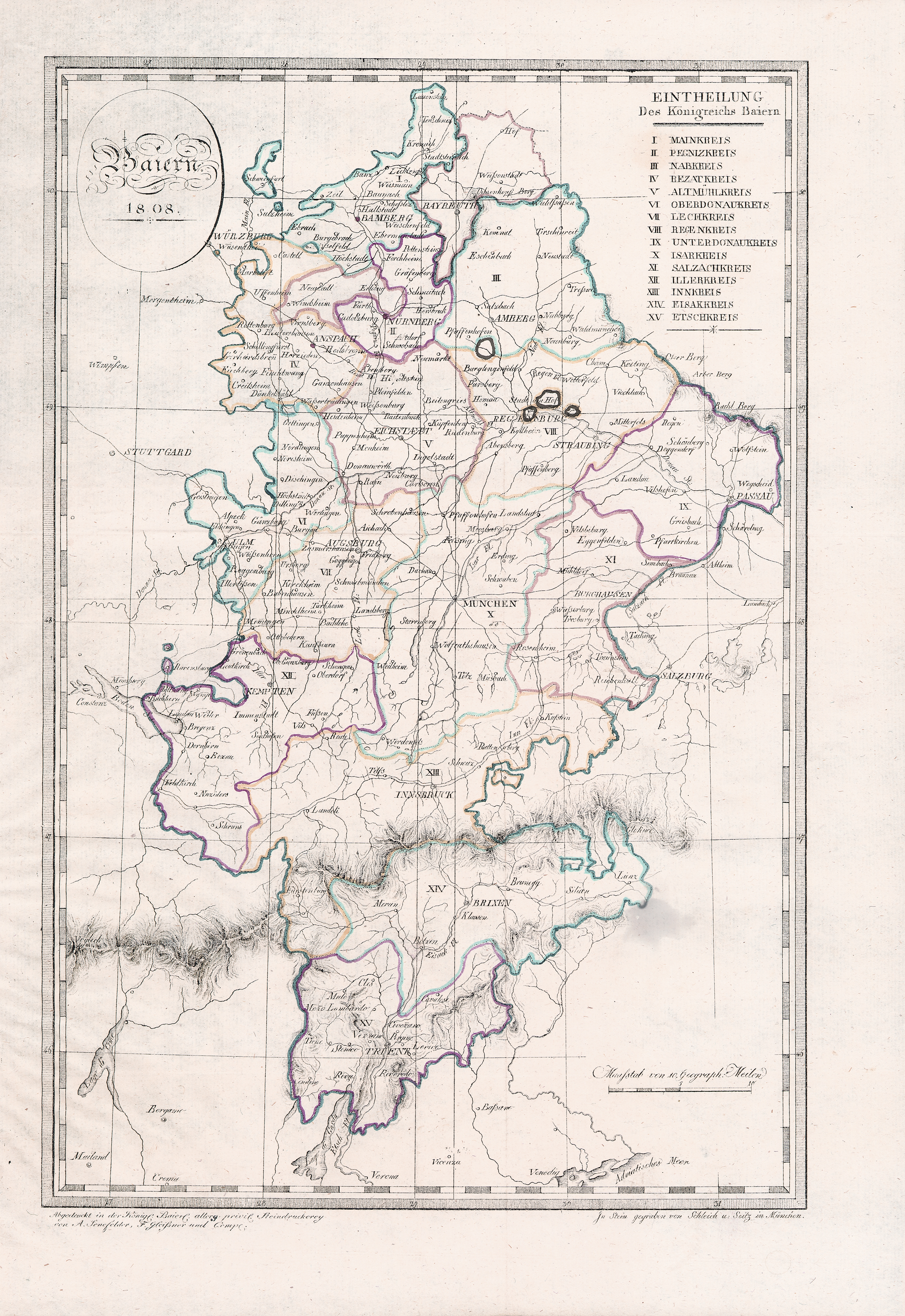
- Districts of Bavaria, including Tyrol, in 1808
- Capital: Würzburg
- Government
- Generalkommissär
  - 1814–1817: Max Freiherr von Lerchenfeld
  - 1817–1825: Franz Wilhelm Freiherr von Asbeck
  - 1826–1832: Max Freiherr von Zu Rhein
  - 1832: Karl Freiherr von Stengel
  - 1833–1837: Graf August von Rechberg und Rothenlöwen
  - 1837: Ferdinand von Andrian-Werburg
- History
  - Established: 1817
  - Disestablished: 1837
Preceded by
| Grand Duchy of Würzburg |
| Principality of Aschaffenburg |
| Grand Duchy of Hesse |
| Grand Duchy of Baden |
Succeeded by
| Lower Franconia |
- Today part of: Bavaria

The Untermainkreis (German: Lower Main District) was one of the administrative districts (German: Bezirke or Regierungsbezirke) of the Kingdom of Bavaria between 1817 and 1837 named after its main river Main. It was the predecessor of the administrative district of Lower Franconia (Regierungsbezirk Unterfranken). Administrative headquarters were in Würzburg.

== Independent Cities ==
- Würzburg
- Aschaffenburg
- Schweinfurt

== Subdivisions ==
The district was divided in the following judicial districts (Landgerichte), according to the original borders of the districts of the former territories (Herrschaftsgerichte):

- Alzenau
- Amorbach
- Arnstein
- Aub (since 1840)
- Aura (until 1829)
- Baunach (since 1840)
- Bischofsheim
- Brückenau (since 1819)
- Dettelbach
- Ebern
- Eltmann (since 1819)
- Eschau (until 1849)
- Euerdorf
- Fechenbach (until 1818)
- Fladungen (until 1828)
- Famersbach (until 1823) (Frammersbach?)
- Gemünden
- Gerolzhofen
- Gersfeld (1820–1843)
- Gleusdorf (since 1840)
- Hammelburg (since 1819)
- Haßfurt
- Hilden
- Hofheim
- Homburg (until 1840)
- Kaltenberg (until 1829)
- Karlstadt
- Kissingen
- Kitzingen
- Kleinwallstadt (until 1829)
- Klingenberg
- Königshofen
- Kreuzwertheim (until 1848)
- Krombach (until 1820)
- Lohr
- Marktbreit
- Marktheidenfeld (since 1840)
- Marktsteft
- Mellrichstadt
- Miltenberg
- Münnerstadt
- Neustadt an der Saale
- Obernburg
- Ochsenfurt
- Orb
- Remlingen (until 1849)
- Röttingen (until 1840)
- Rothenbuch
- Rüdenhausen (1848 – 1853 with Wiesentheid)
- Schöllkrippen (since 1858)
- Sommerhausen (until 1849)
- Stadtprozelten (until 1829 und after 1853)
- Sulzheim (until 1852)
- Tann (until 1834)
- Triefenstein (until 1821)
- Volkach
- Werneck
- Weyhers (since 1819)
- Wiesentheid (1848 – 1853 with Rüdenhausen)
- Würzburg right of Main
- Würzburg left of Main

== History ==
In 1808 the Kingdom of Bavaria was divided into 15 districts. Their names were taken from their main rivers. The Untermainkreis was only established in 1817 after the Grand Duchy of Würzburg, the Principality of Aschaffenburg and other territories had been annexed to Bavaria. Some of the judicial districts had already been established in 1814 and 1816. In the process of another territorial reorganization initiated by King Ludwig I on 29 November 1837, the Untermainkreis was renamed Lower Franconia and Aschaffenburg (Unterfranken und Aschaffenburg). The town name of Aschaffenburg was dropped in 1946.

== Literature ==
- (de) Handbuch der bayerischen Ämter, Gemeinden und Gerichte 1799 - 1980 (Guide of the Bavarian Districts, Municipalities and Courts 1799 - 1980), written by Richard Bauer, Reinhard Heydenreuter, Gerhard Heyl, Emma Mages, Max Piendl, August Scherl, Bernhard Zittel and edited by Wilhelm Volkert, Senior Professor at the University of Regensburg, Munich, 1983, ISBN 3-406-09669-7
