= Sarah Schenirer =

Jewish educator and writer

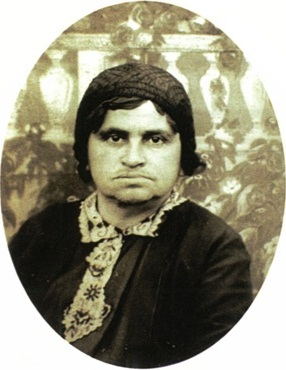
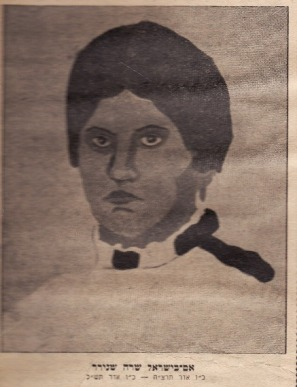
- Sarah Schenirer Sarah Schenirer
- Born: July 15, 1883; Kraków, Poland
- Died: March 1, 1935 (aged 51); Kraków, Poland
- Resting place: Kraków
- Occupations: Founder and director of Bais Yaakov movement
- Known for: Founder of Bais Yaakov school network in Poland

Sarah Schenirer (Polish: Sara Szenirer; Yiddish: שרה שנירר; July 15, 1883 - March 1, 1935 (yartzeit 26 Adar I 5695) was a Polish-Jewish schoolteacher who became a pioneer of Jewish education for girls.

Schenirer is best known for beginning a change in the way women were perceived in Orthodox Judaism. In 1917, she founded an afternoon school in her apartment that was later used as a model by the Agudath Yisrael in its Bais Yaakov (lit., "House of Jacob") school network in Poland, with worldwide lasting effect.

== Early life ==
Sarah Schenirer was born to Bezalel Schenirer (of Tarnów) and Reizel in Kraków, Poland. Her parents were both scions of influential rabbinic families. Her father provided her with religious texts that he had translated into Yiddish. In her memoirs, she describes herself as the unassuming and withdrawn daughter of Belzer Hasidic parents. She was intelligent and had a strong desire to learn, and was envious of her brothers' opportunity to learn and interpret the Torah.

Schenirer would write later in life:

"And as we pass through the days before the High Holy Days ... fathers and sons travel, and thus, they are drawn to Ger, to Belz, to Alexander, to Bobov, to all those places that had been made citadels of conceited religious life, dominated by the figure of the rebbe's personality. And we stay at home, the wives, daughters, and the little ones. We have an empty festival. It is bare of Jewish intellectual content. The women have never learned anything about the spiritual meaning that is concentrated within a Jewish festival. The mother goes to the synagogue, but the services echo faintly into the fenced and boarded-off women's galleries. There is much crying by elderly women. The young girls look at them as though they belong to a different century. Youth and the desire to live a full life shoot up violently in the strong-willed young personalities. Outside the synagogues, the young girls stay chattering; they walk away from the synagogue, where their mothers pour out their vague and heavy feelings. They leave behind them the wailing of the older generation, and follow the urge for freedom and self-expression. Further and further from the synagogue they go, further away, to the dancing, tempting light of a fleeting joy.

Her friends in her Polish school called her "the female Hasid". She attended elementary school for seven years. She then became a seamstress.

== Vienna ==
During World War I, Schenirer and her family fled from Poland to Vienna. While there, she became influenced by Rabbi Moshe Flesch, a disciple of Samson Raphael Hirsch, and Modern Orthodox Judaism. His sermons had emphasized the role of women throughout Jewish history, which inspired Schenirer. Later on, Flesch accepted Schenirer's invitation to "please visit our school."

After her first marriage ended in divorce, Schenirer occasionally attended plays, and public lectures for the women; at one Friday night meeting of the Zionist Ruth Organization, she was pained to observe them lighting candles on Shabbat (Saturday), in violation of halakha (Jewish law).

== Bais Yaakov schools ==
Although Samson Raphael Hirsch's 1853-established Realschule provided girls with "rigorous elementary and secondary school education," and "thousands of girls in Russia attended female-only cheders in the 1890s", there existed no formal curriculum, tradition or template for educating Orthodox girls.

Schenirer returned to Kraków in 1917, where the inspiration she received in Vienna led her to seek to establish a school for girls. She initially approached her brother, who suggested that the idea was controversial. However, he agreed to take her to see the Belzer Rebbe in Marienbad, who gave her his blessing in two words: "Mazel uBrocha." In Schenirer's own description of the meeting, she stated that she wanted to "lead Jewish girls in the path of Judaism", without specifying that she planned to open a school and teach Torah; and he in fact refused to encourage the girls of his Hasidim to go to Bais Yaakov. According to the diary of a seminary student, Bracha Levin, Schenirer did tell the Belzer rebbe of her intentions of teaching young girls, to which he gave his approval, provided that she did not teach Hebrew. This was an assurance she could give, since she did not speak that language. And later on, she consulted with him on a halakhic matter concerning her school.

"People are such perfectionists when it comes to clothing their bodies. Are they so particular when they address themselves to the seeds of the soul?"

— Sarah Schenirer

Schenirer opened a kindergarten for twenty-five children in her seamstress studio, where she emphasized love of Torah and mitzvos. Schenirer had begun to set up lectures and a library for Jewish women but she abandoned that plan. She was admired for her sensitivity and care for others.

After work, Schenirer stayed up late to study the weekly Torah portion and Tanakh (Hebrew Bible) in Yiddish translation:

I enjoyed it tremendously", she wrote, "as it enriched my understanding of the Jewish heritage, and its beauty and depth of thought. But I also took a great interest in secular knowledge: education, history, literature. I especially admired the classical works of Polish and German writers. I loved reading them.

The lessons at her schools consisted of explaining in simple terms to the students the meaning of the Chumash (Pentateuch), and some other sections of Tanakh. She instilled pride of being Orthodox in the students through song, plays, and dancing. Schenirer encountered no resistance from Orthodox leadership in setting up her school; on the contrary, her Kraków school was aided almost from the beginning by the local Agudat Yisrael, and by other local branches of the Agudah, until it was incorporated into the Keren ha-Torah of the World Agudat Yisrael. Within 5 years, the Agudah copied Schenirer's model, growing into 7 schools, with 1,040 students. By 1933, there were 265 schools in Poland alone, with almost 38,000 students.

The main goal of the schools was to

train Jewish daughters so that they will serve the Lord with all their might and with all their hearts; so that they will fulfill the commandments of the Torah with sincere enthusiasm, and will know that they are the children of a people whose existence does not depend upon a territory of its own, as do other nations of the world whose existence is predicated upon a territory and similar racial background.

A review of Sara Schenirer and the Bais Yaakov Movement states that Schenirer was "a prolific writer: her essays, plays, memoir and textbook on Judaism played a major role in establishing Bais Yaakov's culture at the outset."

In 1933, Schenirer retired from her role within the institution, but remained very much involved until her death in 1935.

=== Teacher's Seminary ===
In 1923, Leo Deutschlaender, together with Sarah Schenirer, set up a teachers' seminary, to train staff for the rapidly expanding network of schools. Deutschlaender, a neo-Orthodox pedagogue from Germany, and the head of the educational fund of the Agudat Yisrael (Keren ha-Torah), saw the need for professionally trained teachers.

== Personal life ==
Sarah Schenirer was raised in a Belzer Hasidic family. She married young, but was divorced from her first husband. Schenirer married again later in life. Although she remained childless, her students would speak of themselves as being her children. They are considered the legacy of Frau Schenirer.

On Friday, March 1, 1935 (26th of Adar I, 5695), Schenirer died from cancer, at the age of fifty-one.

== Legacy ==
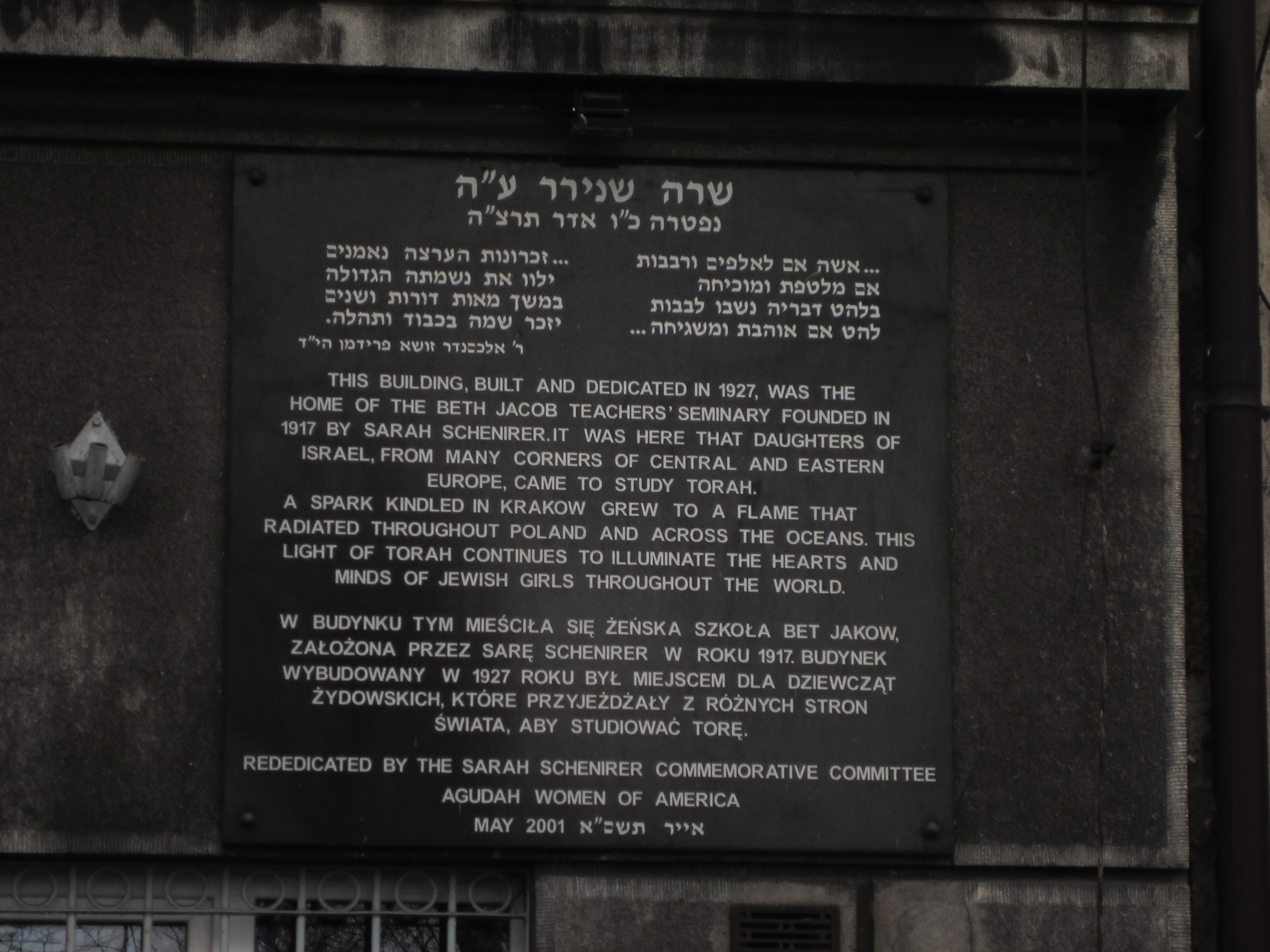
Commemorative plaque on first Bais Yaakov school building, Kraków

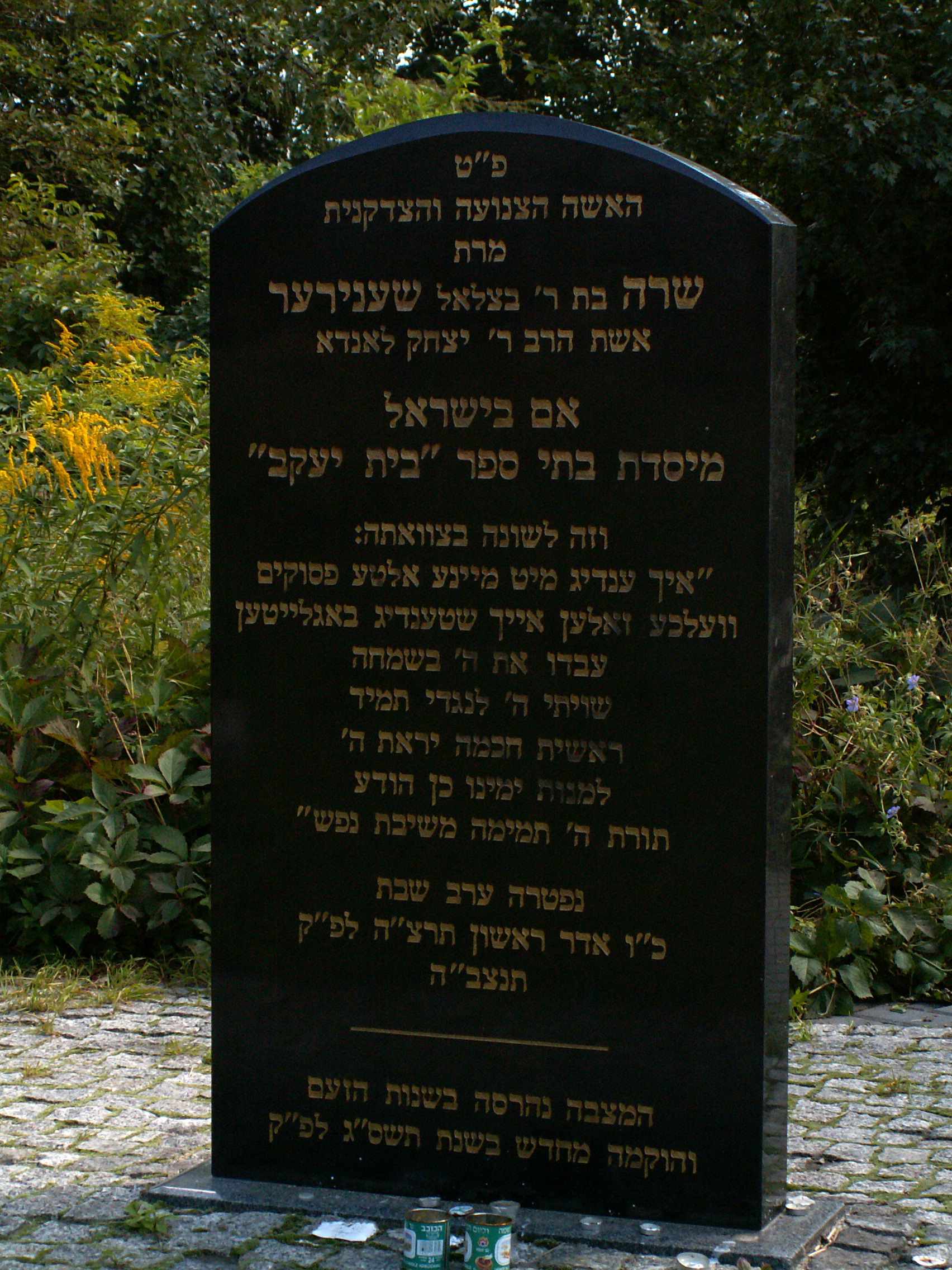
Sarah Schenirer memorial matzevah (tombstone), Podgorze new Jewish cemetery (Kraków, Poland)

By 1939, there were about 250 schools established, and over 40,000 students in Bais Yaakov schools. One of her students was Rebbetzin Vichna Kaplan, founder of the first Bais Yaakov high school and teachers' seminary in America.

In her will, Schenirer wrote: "My dear girls, you are going out into the great world. Your task is to plant the holy seed in the souls of pure children. In a sense, the destiny of Israel of old is in your hands." The admiration was mutual, and the girls within the movement called her "Sarah Imeinu", which translates to "Our Mother Sarah", an honorific evoking the Biblical matriarch Sarah. She had no children of her own; the girls of the movement filled that void for her.

On the 70th anniversary of Schenirer's death in 2005, an "archival repository" was installed in Jerusalem in her honor. In the same year, some of her women supporters set out on a mission to restore her tombstone. Her original tombstone was destroyed when the Kraków-Płaszów concentration camp was built. Her tombstone was restored in 2005. Upon the restoration, the director of the Central Bais Yaakov gave a eulogy for Schenirer, and closed it by saying, "Frau Schenirer, we are not merely placing a memorial on your grave site. We are placing it upon our hearts: for us, and for all the generations who will come after us."

Today, there are many Bais Yaakov schools that carry Schenirer's name, including elementary and high schools, and a college institute in New York that caters to religious Jewish women and girls, allowing them to complete their under-graduate and graduate studies in a religious environment.

The influential twentieth-century Hebrew-language educator and publisher Zevi Scharfstein profiled Schenirer in his 1964 work Great Hebrew Educators (גדולי חינון בעמנו, Rubin Mass Publishers, Jerusalem, 1964).

== Literary references ==
In her novel Peleh Laylah, Israeli author Esther Ettinger, who studied at a Bais Yaakov school as a girl, weaves in passages from Sarah Schenirer's writings.

Her student Pearl Benisch wrote a book about Sarah Schenirer called Carry Me in Your Heart.

Excerpts from the diary of Bracha Levin, written when she was a student at the Krakow Bais Yaakov seminary, and which provide new details of Sarah Schenirer's interactions with students, have recently been published by Rachel Manekin.

== See also ==
- Gender and Judaism
- Haredi Judaism
- History of the Jews in Poland
- Rebbetzin
- Role of women in Judaism
- Tzniut
- Education in Israel
