= Alfredo Goldschmidt =

Chief Rabbi of Colombia

Rabbi Alfredo Goldschmidt

Chief Rabbi of Colombia
- Incumbent
- Assumed office 1991

Rabbi at Centro Israelita de Bogotá
- Incumbent
- Assumed office 1974

Personal details
- Born: 1945 (age 80–81) Buenos Aires, Argentina
- Spouse: Helen Moghaddam
- Children: Two daughters and a son
- Education: Yeshiva Rabbi Samson Raphael Hirsch, City College of New York
- Occupation: Chief Rabbi of Colombia

Alfredo Goldschmidt (Hebrew: אלפרדו גולדשמיט; born August 4, 1945) is the Chief Rabbi (Gran Rabino) of Colombia.

== Early life ==
Rabbi Goldschmidt was born in Buenos Aires, Argentina, to German Jewish immigrants, Herman and Else Goldschmidt. He studied in New York at Yeshiva Rabbi Samson Raphael Hirsch while attaining a degree in psychology at City College of New York. He further studied to become a rabbi in the United States, at Yeshivas Ner Yisroel, of Baltimore, between 1962 and 1968. He returned to Argentina as the director of a religious school (Colegio Integral Rabino Iosef Caro) where he served for seven years.

== Colombia ==
In 1973 the Jewish community of Bogotá was looking for a rabbi. In February 1974, he became rabbi of Centro Israelita de Bogotá where he continues to serve. In 1991 he was officially acknowledged as the Chief Rabbi by the Colombian government.

Goldschmidt has also been an active rabbi at the local Jewish school in Bogota, Colegio Colombo Hebreo. He has been very active with the Colombian youth and has been an integral part of the Zionist youth movement Kinneret.

Since the outset of his tenure, Rabbi Goldschmidt has maintained important interfaith relationships, with religious leaders of all faiths from around Colombia. Rabbi Goldschmidt has also played an integral role in assisting numerous Colombian communities, who have rediscovered their long lost Jewish heritage, return to Judaism and seek conversion.

Goldschmidt is involved in various Kashrut efforts in Colombia. He also teaches numerous Torah classes, and engages in singing and music through the use of his accordion.

== Awards and Recognitions ==
Rabbi Goldschmidt was awarded the Prize for Exemplary Educator of the Diaspora, from The World Council of Torah Education in 2021. He received his award in Jerusalem on October 23, 2022, in the presence of Jerusalem's mayor Moshe Lion and Rishon LeZion Sephardic Chief Rabbi of Jerusalem Shlomo Moshe Amar.
