= Yeshiva Rabbi Samson Raphael Hirsch =

Yeshiva in New York City

Coordinates: 40°51′11.79″N 73°56′5.83″W

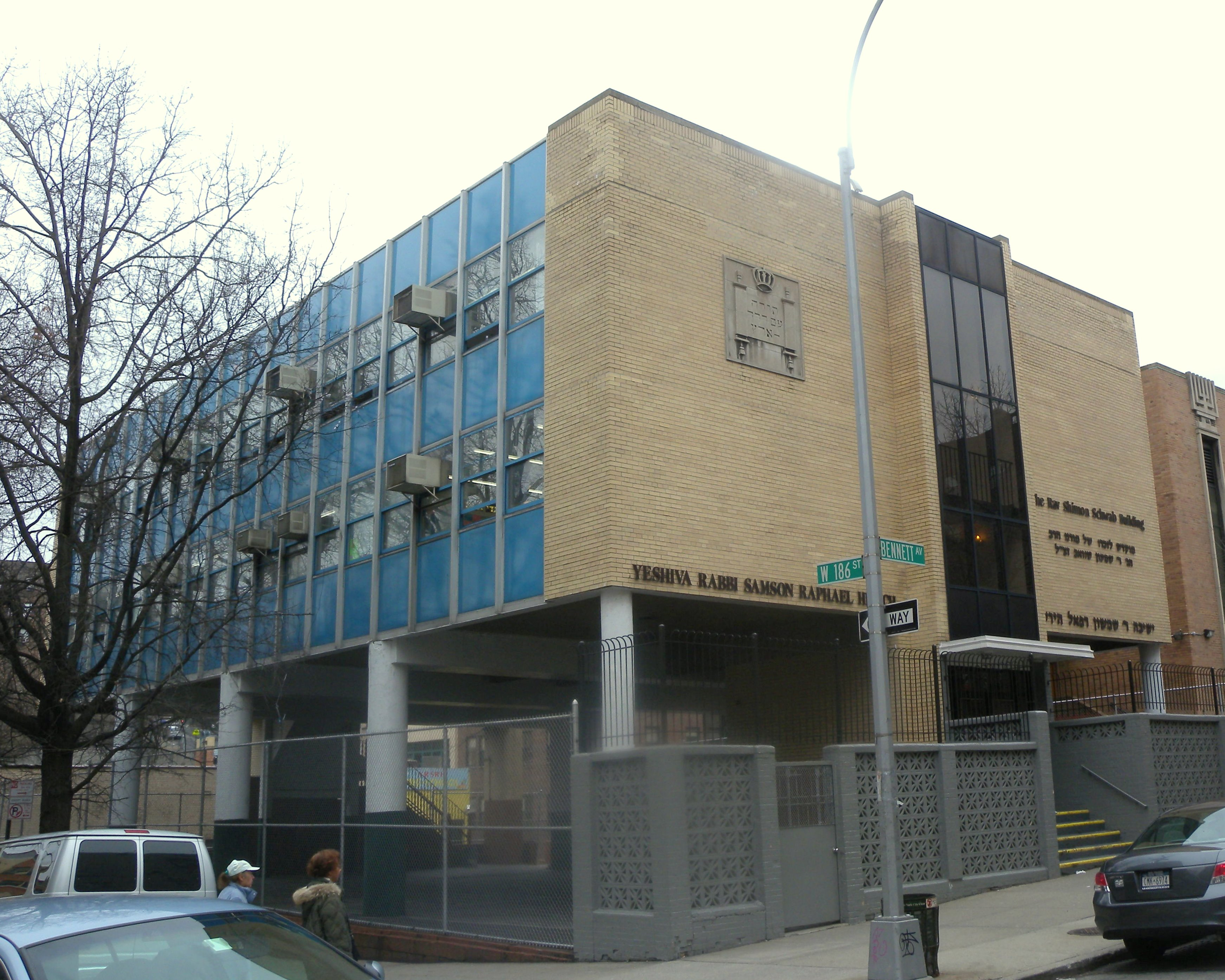

Information
- Established: 1944; 82 years ago

Yeshiva Rabbi Samson Raphael Hirsch (YRSRH, also known as Breuer's, after its creator) was founded in New York City in 1944, as a means of reestablishing the Orthodox Jewish community of Frankfurt, Germany in the United States. The school, founded by Rabbi Joseph Breuer, is run according to the philosophy of Rabbi Breuer's grandfather, Rabbi Samson Raphael Hirsch. It is located in the Upper Manhattan neighborhood of Washington Heights.

The institution has several divisions, including separate elementary and middle schools for boys, and a high school for boys. It also maintained The "Rika Breuer Teacher's Seminary" for many years, which was discontinued in 2004; it was headed by Rabbi Joseph Elias. The girls high school and post-high school beis medrash have also closed.

It is under the general auspices of Khal Adath Jeshurun, which is an Orthodox kehilla that serves the mostly German-Jewish community of Washington Heights and Fort Tryon in upper Manhattan.

== See also ==
- Samson Raphael Hirsch
- Torah Lehranstalt
- Joseph Breuer
- Shimon Schwab
- Alfredo Goldschmidt (rabbi)

=== German Wikipedia ===
- Former Samson Raphael Hirsch School in Frankfurt am Main, Germany
