= Bais Yaakov =

Haredi Jewish primary and secondary education for women

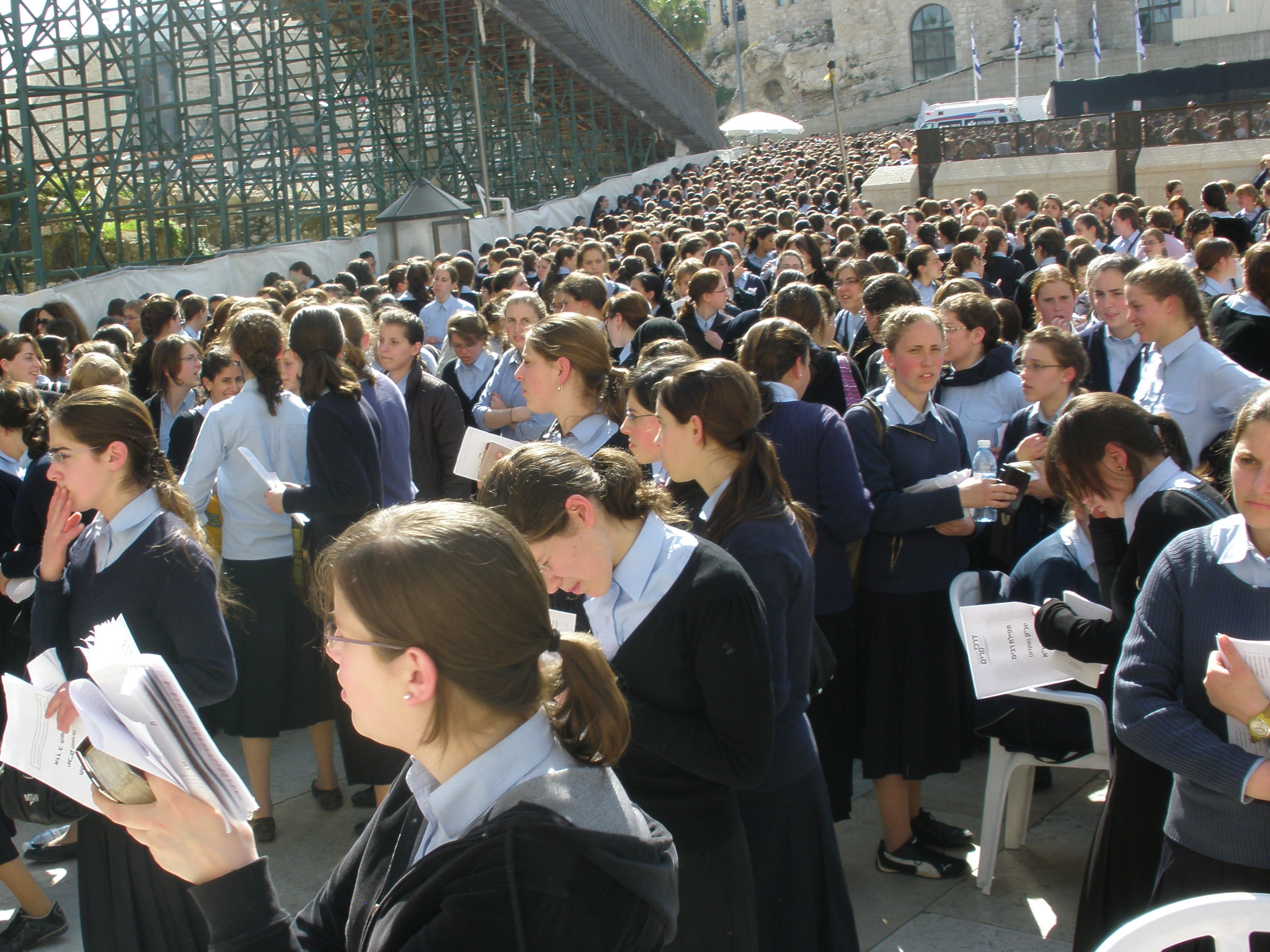
Bais Yaakov students praying at the Western Wall in Israel in 2011

Bais Yaakov (Hebrew: בית יעקב, romanized: Beit Ya’akov, lit. 'House [of] Jacob', also Beis Yaakov, Beit Yaakov, Beth Jacob or Beys Yankev) is a genericized name for full-time Haredi Jewish elementary and secondary schools for girls worldwide.

Bais Yaakov, started by Sarah Schenirer in post-World War I Kraków, was at the time a revolutionary approach to Jewish women's education. The establishment of Bais Yaakov schooling for girls had a tremendous impact in retaining traditional Jewish society at a time when these Jewishly-uneducated girls were attracted to assimilation and modernity. The movement grew at an astonishing pace, expanding to include high schools, teacher seminaries, summer programmes, vocational schools, and youth movements, in Poland and beyond; it continues to flourish throughout the Jewish diaspora. The schools have risen to prominence in Haredi communities within Orthodox Judaism, with branches located worldwide in every Jewish community with a significant student population.

While many of these schools carry the Bais Yaakov name, they are not necessarily affiliated, though they may be for other reasons.

== History ==
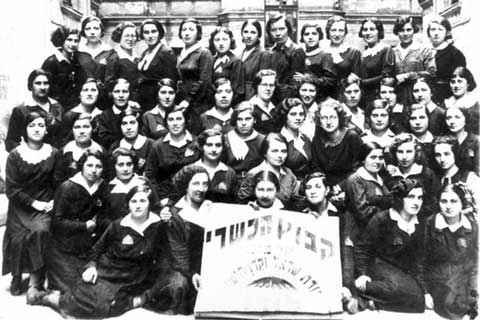
The second graduating class of the Bais Ya'akov in Łódź, Poland, in 1934.

The Bais Yaakov movement was started by seamstress Sarah Schenirer in 1917 in Kraków, Poland.

While boys attended cheder and Talmud Torah schools (and in some cases yeshivas), at that time, there was no formalized system of Jewish education for girls and young Jewish women.

Schenirer saw that there was a high rate of assimilation among girls due to the vast secular influences of the non-Jewish schools that the girls were then attending. Sarah Schenirer concluded that only providing young Jewish women with a thorough, school-based Jewish education would effectively combat this phenomenon. She started a school of her own, trained other women to teach, and set up similar schools in other cities throughout Europe. The first school building survives as apartments, and is marked with a bronze plaque.

She obtained the approval of Yisrael Meir Kagan (author of Chofetz Chaim), who issued a responsum holding that contemporary conditions required departing from traditional prohibitions on teaching women Torah and accepting the view that it was permitted. Following the Chofetz Chaim's approbation, the Bais Yaakov Movement in Poland was taken under the wing of Agudath Israel, the political organization of world Orthodoxy. Additionally, Schenirer sought and received approbation from Hasidic rabbis as well, most notably the Belzer Rebbe and the Gerrer Rebbe. After its adoption by the Agudat Israel in 1923 hundreds of schools were created in Poland.

Judith Grunfeld was persuaded to assist Schenirer. In addition to Jewish subjects of bible and commentary, prayers, laws, and the duties expected of the Jewish woman, secular subjects such as literature, German and other subjects were taught. With the rapid increase in schools there was a need to train teachers as well, so a seminary was established to train girls to themselves become teachers and spread the Bais Yaakov movement. Grunfeld would lead the seminary from 1924 to 1929. Rabbi Yehudah Leib Orlean, became the director of the Kraków seminary and the Kraków Central Office in 1933.

Girls who were taught in the Bais Yaakov movement used their education as psychological support to survive World War II and the Holocaust.

Besides elementary and high schools, there are also post-secondary schools in the Bais Yaakov system, usually referred to as 'seminaries'. These run various courses, generally lasting between one and three years.

== Etymology ==
The name Bais Yaakov comes from a verse in the Book of Exodus in which the expression "House of Jacob" is understood by Jewish commentaries on the Bible to refer to the female segment of the Jewish nation: Moses is instructed to "say to the house of Jacob, and tell the children of Israel", where the parallel expressions are interpreted as referring respectively to the female and male segments.

== Current ==
=== Educational approach ===
The educational policies of most Bais Yaakov schools worldwide is generally that of Haredi Judaism and the Agudath Israel movement. In accordance with the differences between the Israeli and Diaspora Haredi communities, there are slight variations in outlook and philosophy between Israeli, American, and European Bais Yaakov schools. Israeli Bais Yaakov schools tend to de-emphasize the secular content of the curriculum, whereas in North America and Europe, the girls frequently receive a more diverse secular education. Large cities may have several Bais Yaakov schools, each with small variations in philosophy, typically over the importance placed on secular studies and/or accommodations made to secular values.

Students are required to uphold a dress code or wear uniforms which conform to the rules of tznius (modesty). Uniforms differ from school to school, but typically consist of a long pleated skirt, oxford shirt, and sweater or sweatshirt.

The school's primary purpose is to prepare students to be contributors to family and community, as good Jews, wives, professionals, and mothers.

Secular studies sometimes reflect government proficiency requirements in such subjects as math, science, literature, and history in their respective countries. But extracurricular activities have, since the movement's earliest days, reflected a careful willingness to adopt and adapt secular practices that could enhance the educational experience, e.g., community theater, albeit tailored to Haredi values and mores.

In Israel, nearly all of the Haredi schools for girls operate within one of three educational systems; these schools utilize the Israeli Ministry of Education's core curriculum, and most take the requisite Bagrut high school matriculation exams.

=== Curriculum ===
Most non-Hasidic Bais Yaakov schools in America teach Judaic studies in the mornings and a college preparatory program of secular studies in the afternoons. Judaic studies usually include study of Chumash (Pentateuch), Nevi'im (Prophets), and other parts of the Hebrew Bible; and instruction in the Hebrew language, in Jewish history, and the study of practical halakha (Jewish law), sometimes directly from the text, and other times as a summary of classic halakha sources.

One of the tenets of Orthodox Judaism is that it is impossible to fully understand the written Torah without the Jewish commentaries; so, Bais Yaakov girls are taught the Tanakh through this approach. A major focus is on Rashi, considered the foremost Torah commentator.

The curriculum of Bais Yaakov differs from that of male-only yeshivas, where the core component of study is the Talmud. Girls in Bais Yaakov schools do not typically learn law from the text of the Talmud itself, but may study its non-legal portions of aggadah (homiletics). This contrasts with the approach of many Modern Orthodox Jewish day schools, which increasingly teach Talmud to women.

=== Locations ===
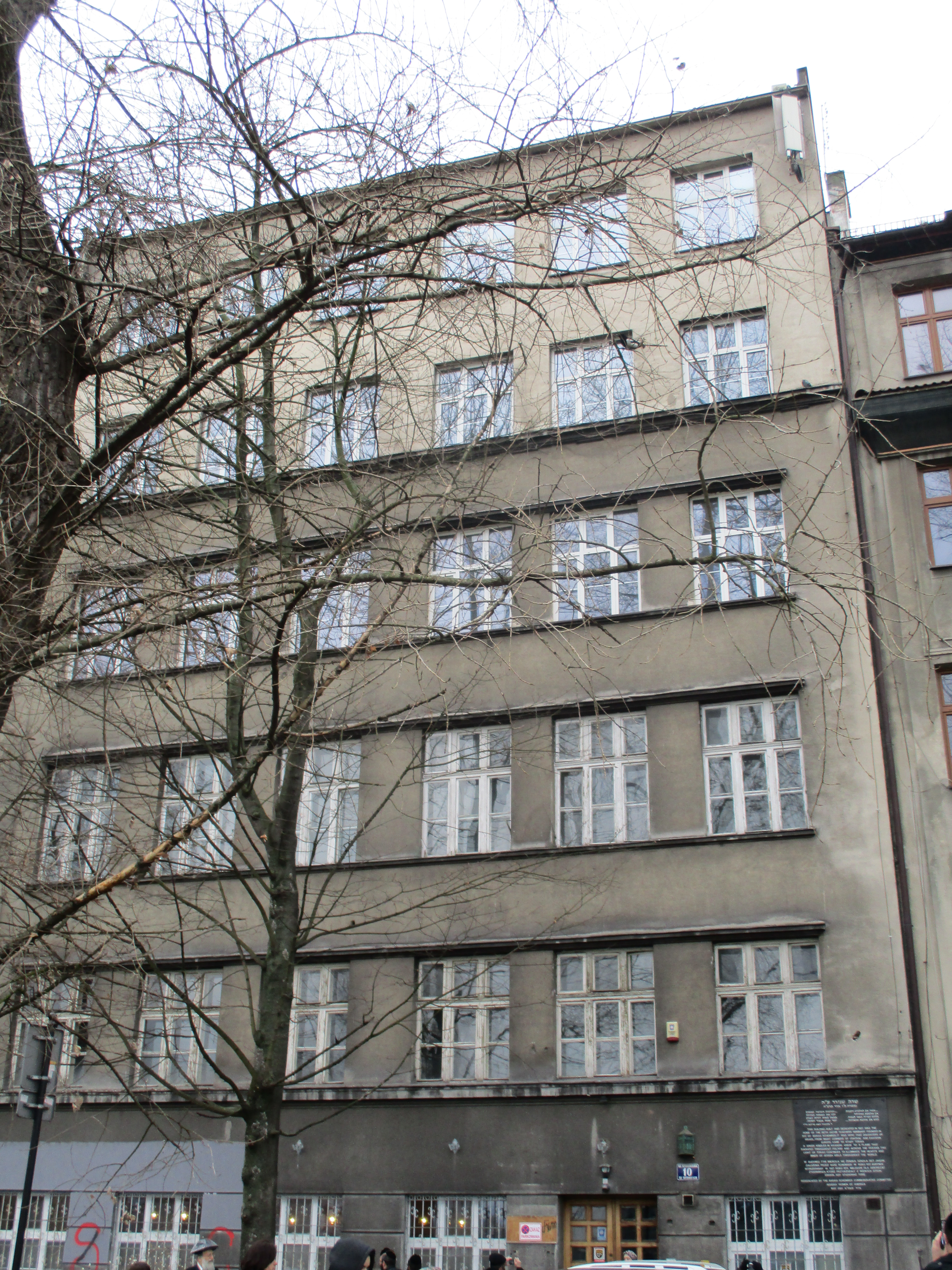
Beit Yaakov Teachers' Seminary, Kraków, Poland.

Branches exist in most North American cities with large populations of Orthodox Jews, including New York City, Boston, Montreal, Miami, Chicago, Detroit, Atlanta, Los Angeles, Baltimore, Denver, St. Louis, Toronto, Lakewood, Passaic, and Monsey.

Bais Yaakov-type schools exist in most Israeli cities, and are also found in major Jewish centers in Europe, such as London, Manchester, Antwerp, Paris, Aix-les-Bains and Moscow, and in several other Jewish centers around the world, including Johannesburg, Buenos Aires, São Paulo and Melbourne.

Pre-war locations included over 260 towns and cities in Poland, with its central teachers' seminary in Kraków.

== Hasidic schools ==
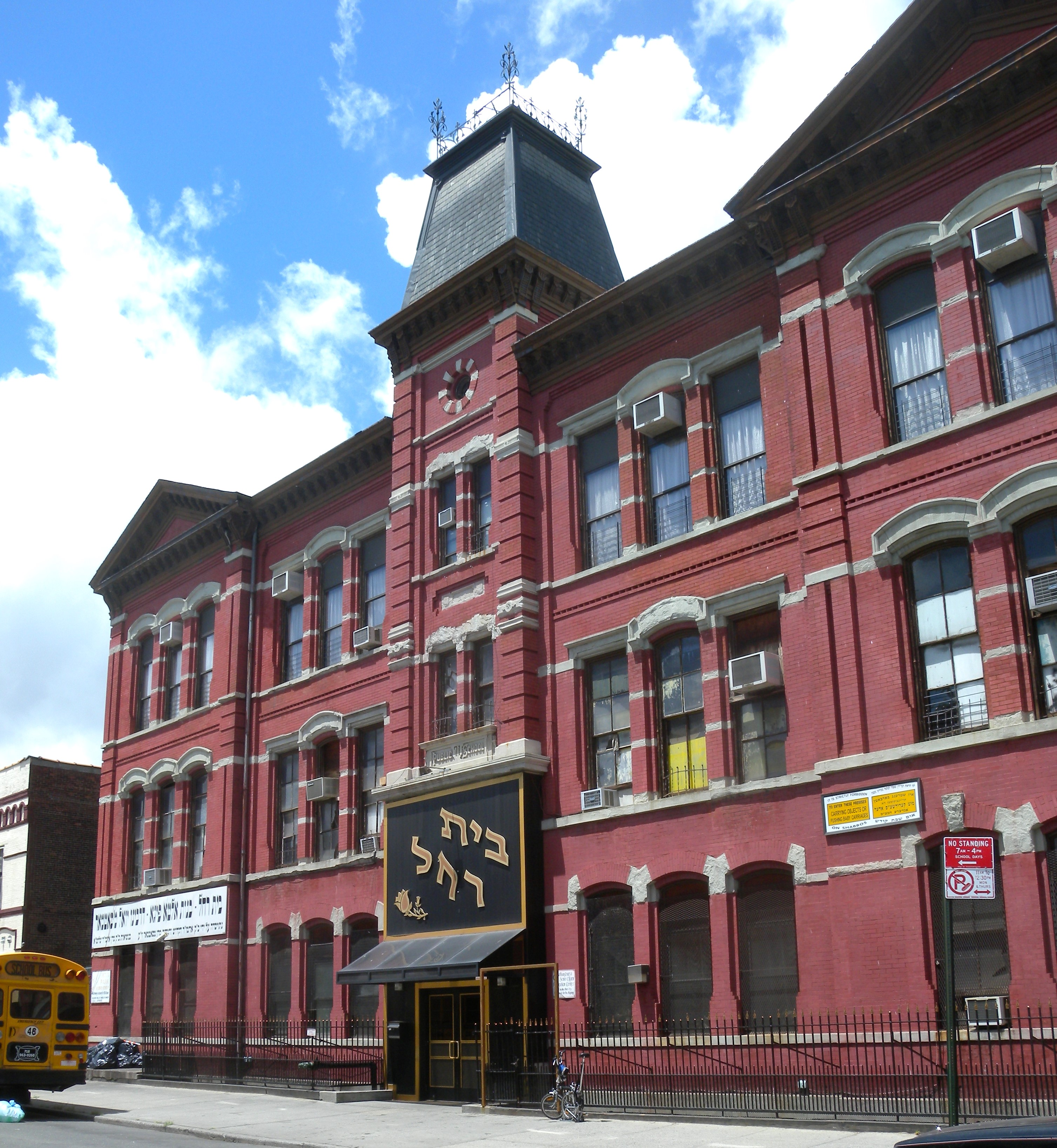
Beis Rochel School, Brooklyn in 2010

Schools for girls within the Hasidic world generally share much of the same values, outlook, methodology, and aims of the non-Hasidic Haredi schools. However, they may place a greater emphasis on the teachings of their individual Hasidic Rebbes, and the instruction of religious subjects may be conducted in Yiddish, which is still the home language for most Hasidic families in New York today.

Schools for young Hasidic girls which are not part of the Bais Yaakov movement take names such as:

- Bais Rivkah, Bnos Menachem, Bnos Rabbeinu, Bais Chaya Mushka, or Bais Chana for the Chabad Lubavitch girls' schools.
- Bnos Zion for the Bobov girls' schools.
- Bnos Belz or Beis Malka for Belz girls' schools.
- Bnos Vizhnitz for Vizhnitz girls' schools.
- Bnos Frima for Munkacs
- Beis Rochel schools for girls of the Satmar community, as well as some girls' schools of related Hasidic groups (often of Hungarian background).
- Bnos Yaakov or Bnos Esther for Puppa Hasidim

These schools (excepting Chabad) follow a different curriculum of Judaic studies, which is less text-based, and more focused on practical knowledge, than the curriculum in other schools. Within their communities, these schools are usually referred to as offering education al pi taharas kodesh, roughly translating as "holy, pure education".

Several Hasidic groups, also, extend their program to the "Seminary" level, where women train for two years to certify as teachers, in parallel with further Torah study.

== The Bais Yaakov Project ==
This project, set up in 2019 at the University of Toronto and partially funded by the Social Sciences and Humanities Research Council of Canada, collects and digitizes material on the Bais Yaakov movement from 1917 through today, and make this available to the public.

== See also ==
Institutions

- Mesivta: a Boys' Yeshiva high school
- Ulpana: a Religious Zionist girls' high school in Israel
- Midrasha/Seminary: a women's institute of Torah study

Discussion

- Jewish education § Girls' education
- Hashkafa § Gender roles
