= Lower Franconia =

Lower Franconia Unterfranken (German)
- Regierungsbezirk
- Flag Coat of arms

- Map of Bavaria highlighting Lower Franconia
- Country: Germany
- State: Bavaria
- Region seat: Würzburg

Government
  - District President: Stefan Funk (CSU)

Area
  - Total: 8,530.99 km^{2} (3,293.83 sq mi)

Population (31 December 2025)
  - Total: 1,314,706
  - Density: 154.109/km^{2} (399.142/sq mi)

GDP
  - Total: €67.892 billion (2024)
  - Per capita: €51,511 (2024)
- Website: www.regierung.unterfranken.bayern.de

Lower Franconia (German: Unterfranken, pronounced [ˈʊntɐˌfʁaŋkn̩]) is one of seven districts of Bavaria, Germany. The districts of Lower, Middle and Upper Franconia make up the region of Franconia. It consists of nine districts and 308 municipalities (including three cities).

== History ==
After the founding of the Kingdom of Bavaria the state was totally reorganised and, in 1808, divided into 15 administrative government regions (German: Regierungsbezirke, singular Regierungsbezirk), in Bavaria called Kreise (singular: Kreis). They were created in the fashion of the French departements, quite even in size and population, and named after their main rivers.

In the following years, due to territorial changes (e.g., loss of Tyrol, addition of the Palatinate), the number of Kreise was reduced to 8. One of these was the Untermainkreis (Lower Main District). In 1837 king Ludwig I of Bavaria renamed the Kreise after historical territorial names and tribes of the area. This also involved some border changes or territorial swaps. Thus the name Untermainkreis changed to Lower Franconia and Aschaffenburg, but the city name was dropped in the middle of the 20th century, leaving just Lower Franconia.

From 1933, the regional Nazi Gauleiter, Otto Hellmuth, (who had renamed his party Gau "Mainfranken") insisted on renaming the government district Mainfranken as well. He encountered resistance from Bavarian state authorities but finally succeeded in having the name of the district changed, effective 1 June 1938. After 1945 the name Unterfranken was restored.

The municipal reform (Kreisreform) of June 1972 consolidated the 22 country districts of Lower Franconia into nine.

New district	Former district(s)
Aschaffenburg	Aschaffenburg, Alzenau
Bad Kissingen	Bad Kissingen, Bad Brückenau, Hammelburg
Haßberge	Ebern, Haßfurt, Hofheim in Unterfranken, part of Gerolzhofen
Kitzingen	Kitzingen, part of Gerolzhofen
Main-Spessart	Gemünden, Karlstadt, Lohr, part of Marktheidenfeld
Miltenberg	Miltenberg, Obernburg, part of Marktheidenfeld
Rhön-Grabfeld	Bad Neustadt an der Saale, Königshofen, Mellrichstadt
Schweinfurt	Schweinfurt, part of Gerolzhofen
Würzburg	Würzburg, Ochsenfurt, part of Gerolzhofen, part of Marktheidenfeld

Unterfranken is the north-west part of Franconia and consists of three district-free cities (Kreisfreie Städte) and nine country districts (Landkreise).

The major portion of the Franconian wine region is situated in Lower Franconia.

== Economy ==
The Gross domestic product (GDP) of the region was 53.7 billion € in 2018, accounting for 1.6% of German economic output. GDP per capita adjusted for purchasing power was 37,500 € or 124% of the EU27 average in the same year. The GDP per employee was 102% of the EU average.

=== Transport ===
Residents in the region would use Frankfurt Airport and Nuremberg Airport for air travel.

== Coat of arms ==
The coat of arms includes the "Franconian Rake" (the arms of Duchy of Franconia) in the upper portion, the "Rennfähnlein", a banner, quarterly argent (silver) and gules (red), on a lance or (gold), in bend, on an azure (blue) field, associated with Würzburg in the lower left quadrant, and a white/silver wheel on a red field symbolizing the clerical state of Mainz, in the lower right quadrant.

== Area and population ==
City or District	Population (2013)		Area (km^{2})		Communities	
City of Aschaffenburg	67,748	5.22%	62	0.7%	1	0.3%
City of Schweinfurt	51,918	4.00%	36	0.4%	1	0.3%
City of Würzburg	124,154	9,57%	88	1.0%	1	0.3%
Aschaffenburg	172,521	13.30%	699	8.2%	32	10.4%
Bad Kissingen	103,003	7.94%	1,137	13.3%	26	8.4%
Haßberge	84,136	6.49%	956	11.2%	26	8.4%
Kitzingen	88,025	6.79%	684	8.0%	31	10.1%
Main-Spessart	126,458	9.75%	1,322	15.5%	40	13.0%
Miltenberg	127,980	9.87%	716	8.4%	32	10.4%
Rhön-Grabfeld	80,065	6.17%	1,022	12.0%	37	12.0%
Schweinfurt	112,916	8.71%	842	9.9%	29	9.4%
Würzburg	158,132	12.19%	968	11.3%	52	16.9%
Total	1,297,056	100.0%	8,531	100.0%	308	100.0%

Historical population
1910	710,943
1939	844,732
1950	1,038,930
1961	1,089,983
1970	1,181,309
1987	1,202,711
2002	1,344,300
2005	1,341,481
2010	1,318,695
2015	1,306,048
2019	1,317,619

== Main sights ==
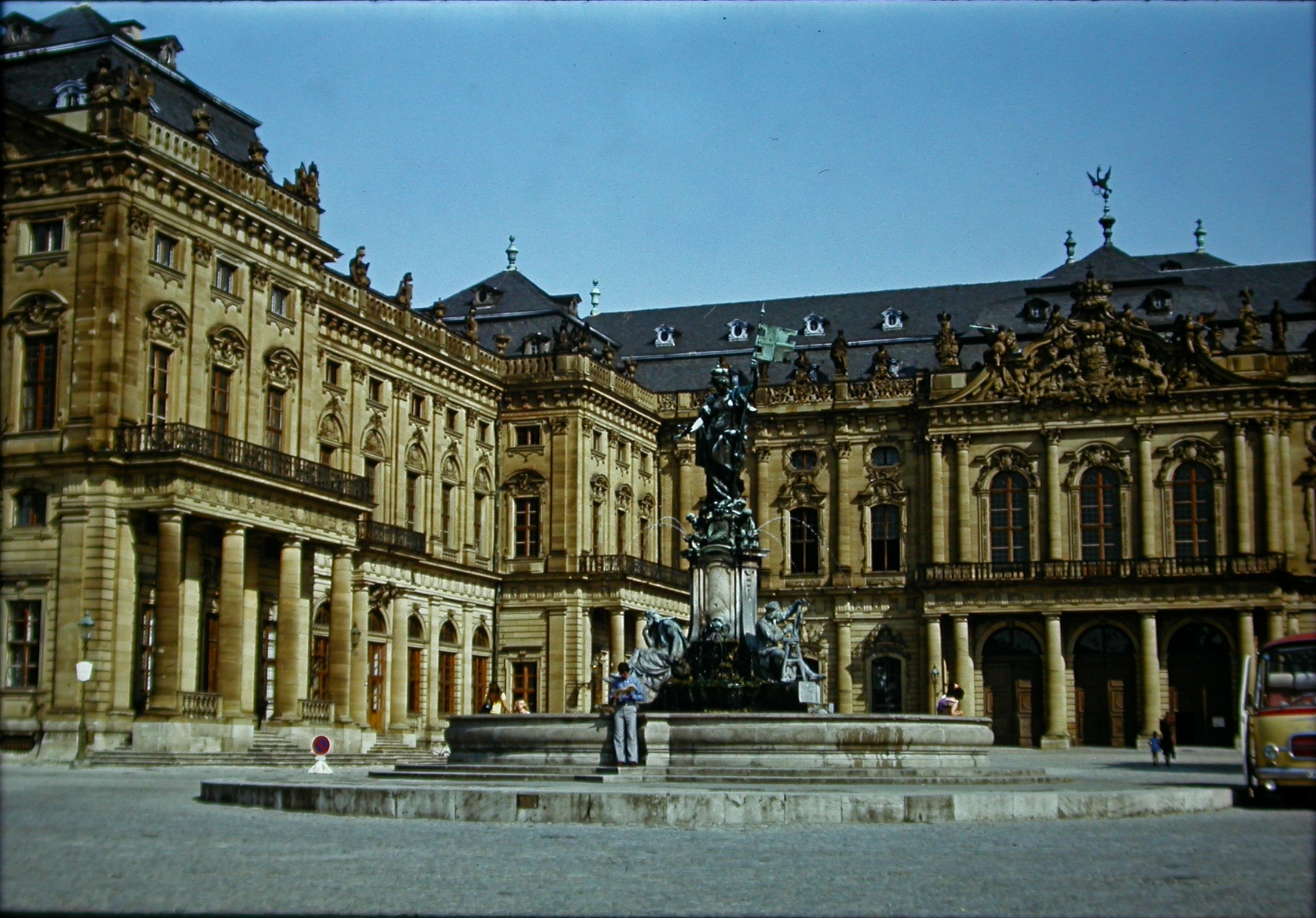
Würzburg Residenz

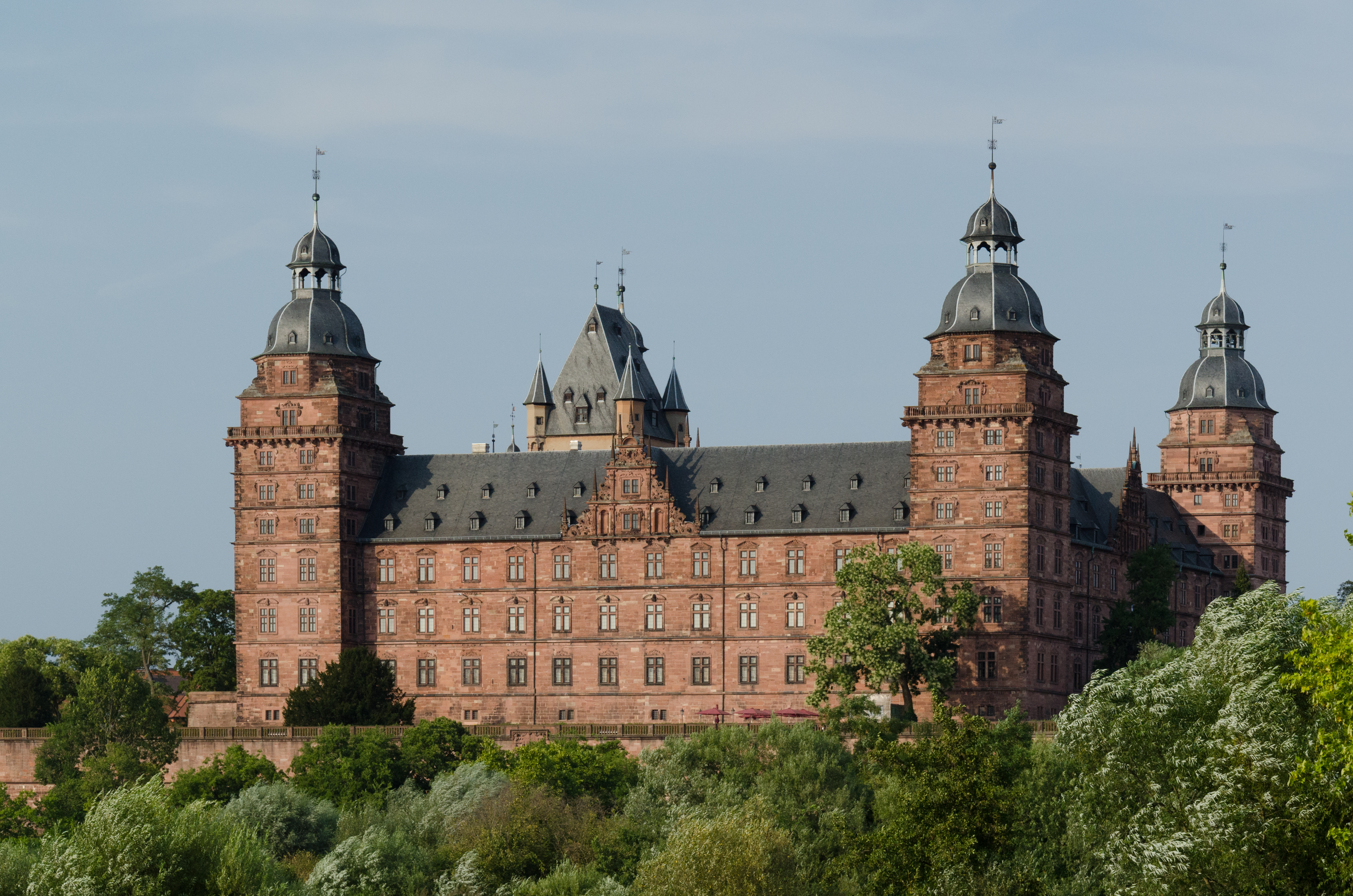
Aschaffenburg, Johannisburg

Next to the former episcopal residence cities of Würzburg (with Veitshöchheim) and Aschaffenburg, the towns of Miltenberg, Amorbach and Werneck, the scenic attractions of the River Main including the Mainschleife at Volkach and the low mountain ranges of the Rhön with the spa town Bad Kissingen and of the Spessart with Mespelbrunn Castle belong to the major tourist attractions.

== Notable people from Lower Franconia ==
- Regiomontanus
- Florian Geyer
- Tilman Riemenschneider
- Balthasar Neumann
- Friedrich Rückert
- Wilhelm Conrad Röntgen
- Leonhard Frank
- Carl Diem
- Dirk Nowitzki
- Alois Alzheimer
- Joseph von Lindwurm
- Philipp Franz von Siebold
- Lujo Brentano

== Institutes of higher education ==
- Julius-Maximilians-Universität Würzburg
- University of Applied Sciences Würzburg-Schweinfurt
- Hochschule Aschaffenburg

== See also ==
- Middle Franconia
- Upper Franconia
