= Veszprém =

- City with county rights
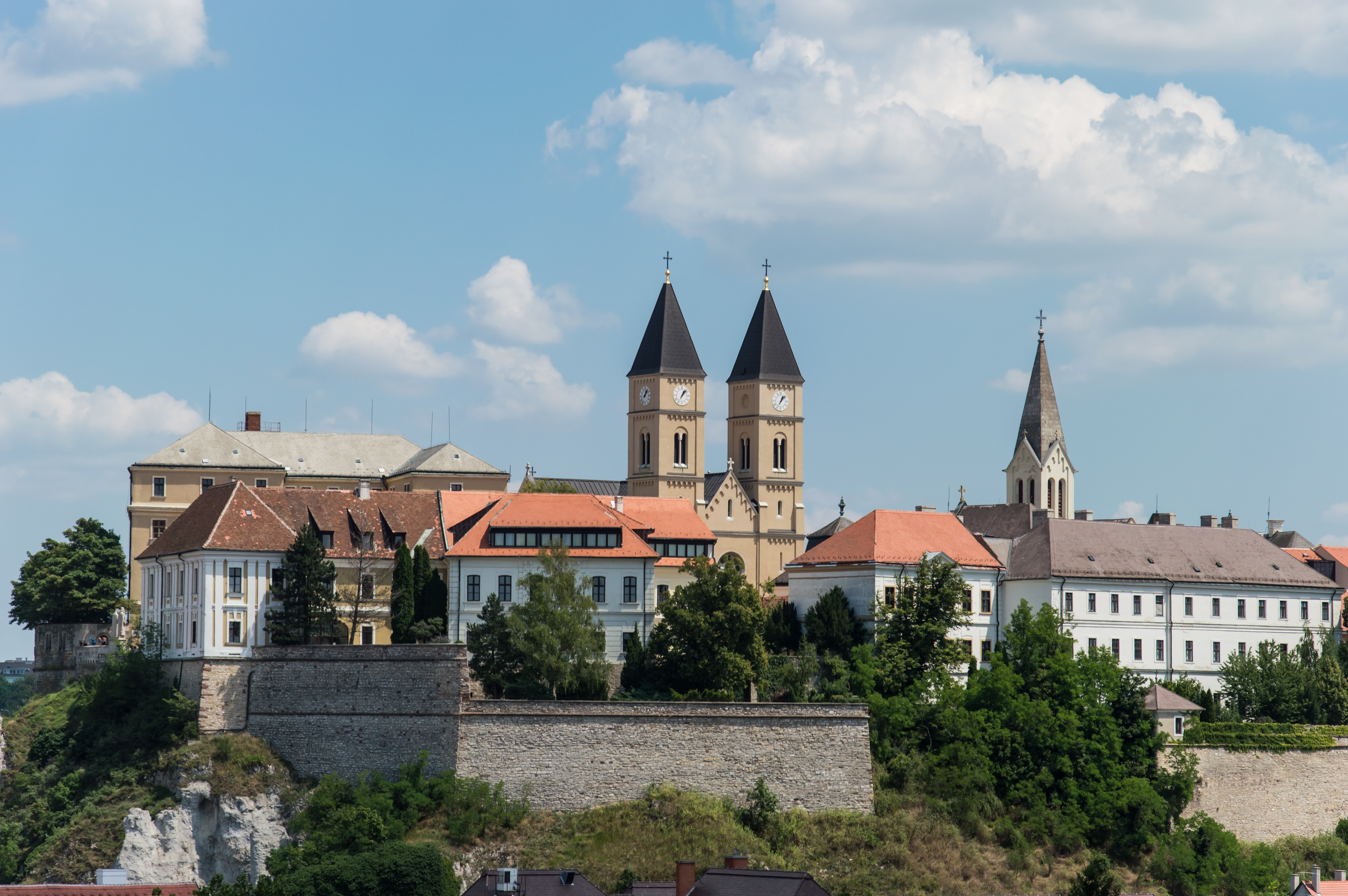
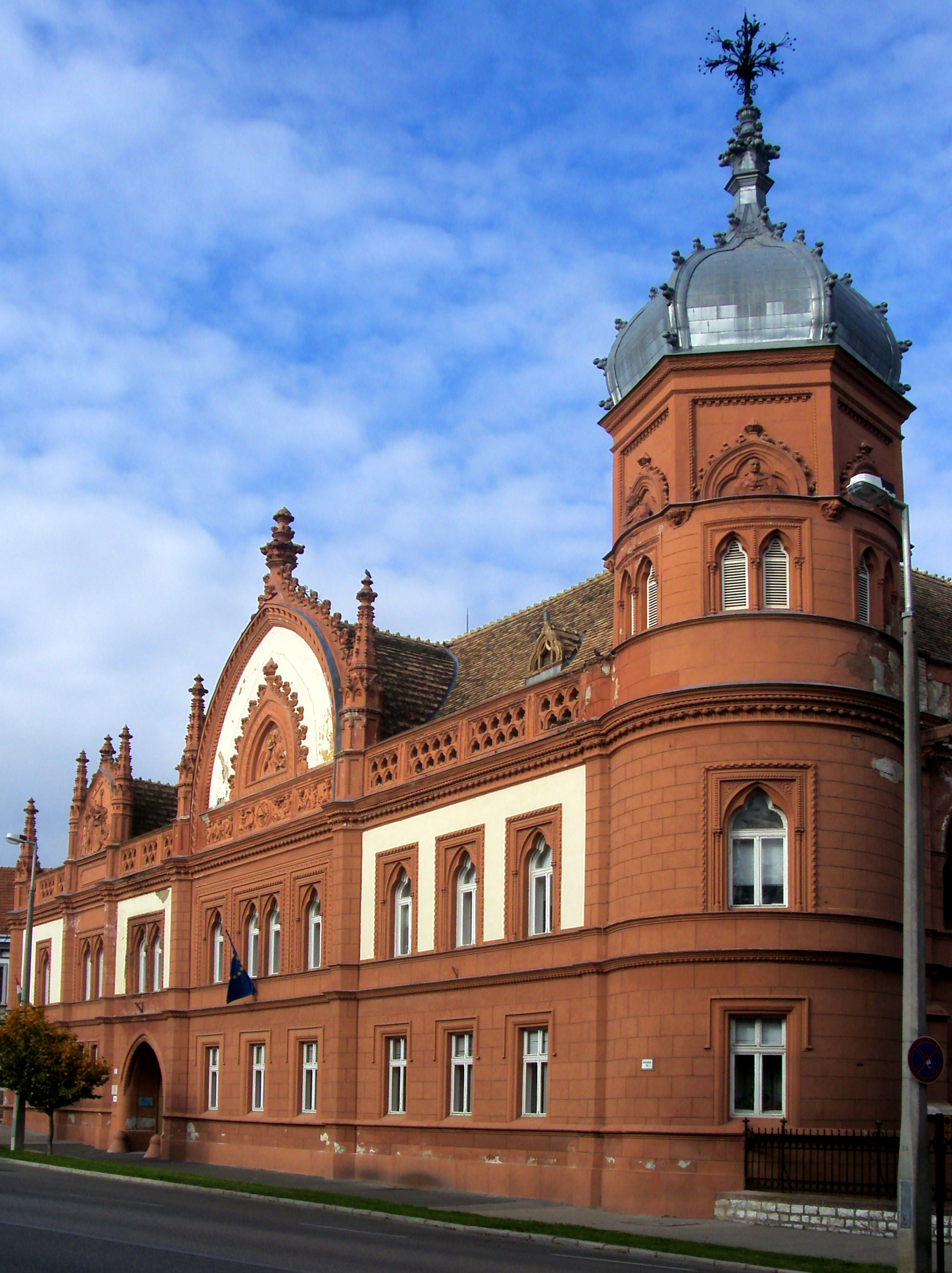
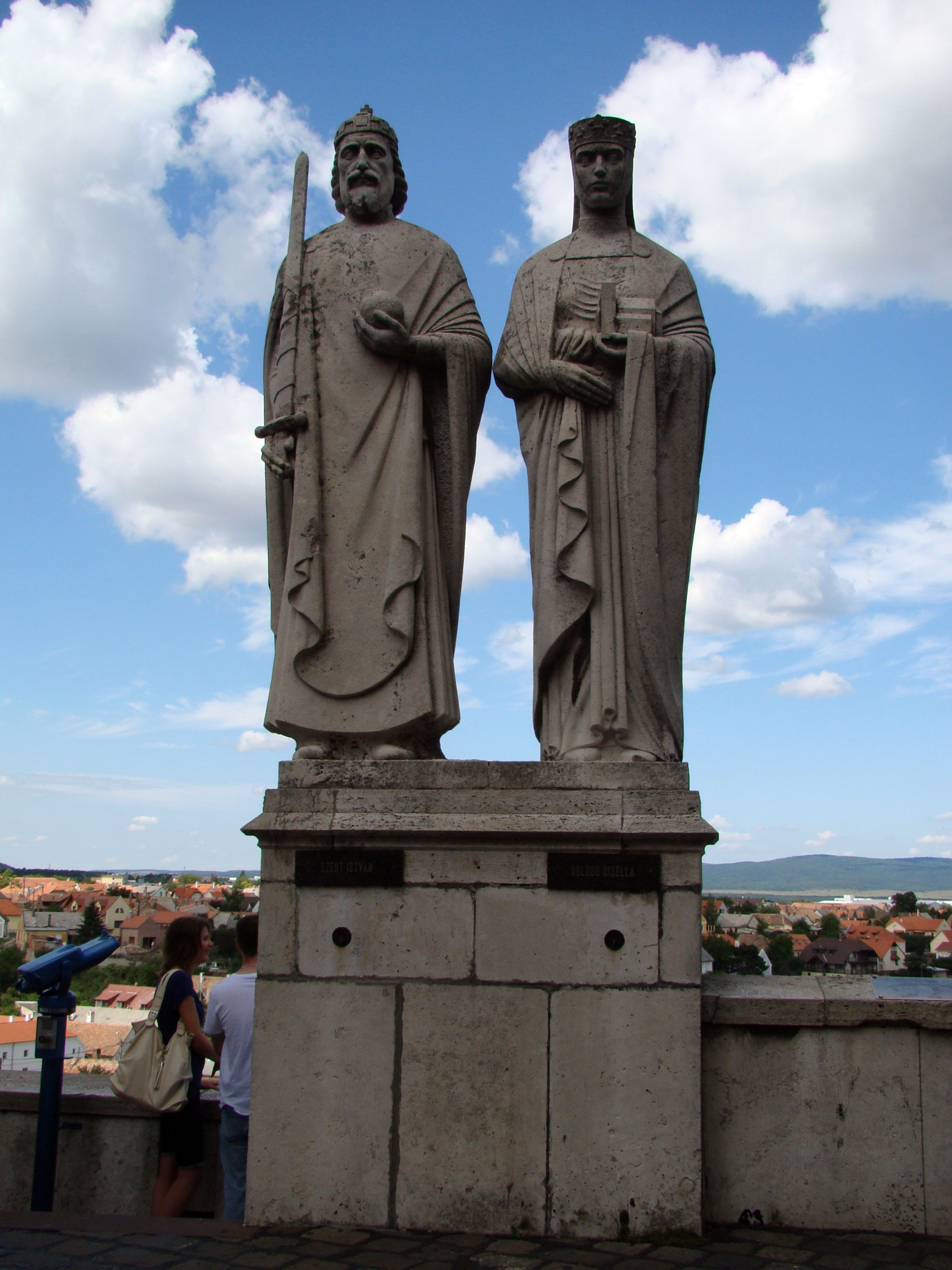
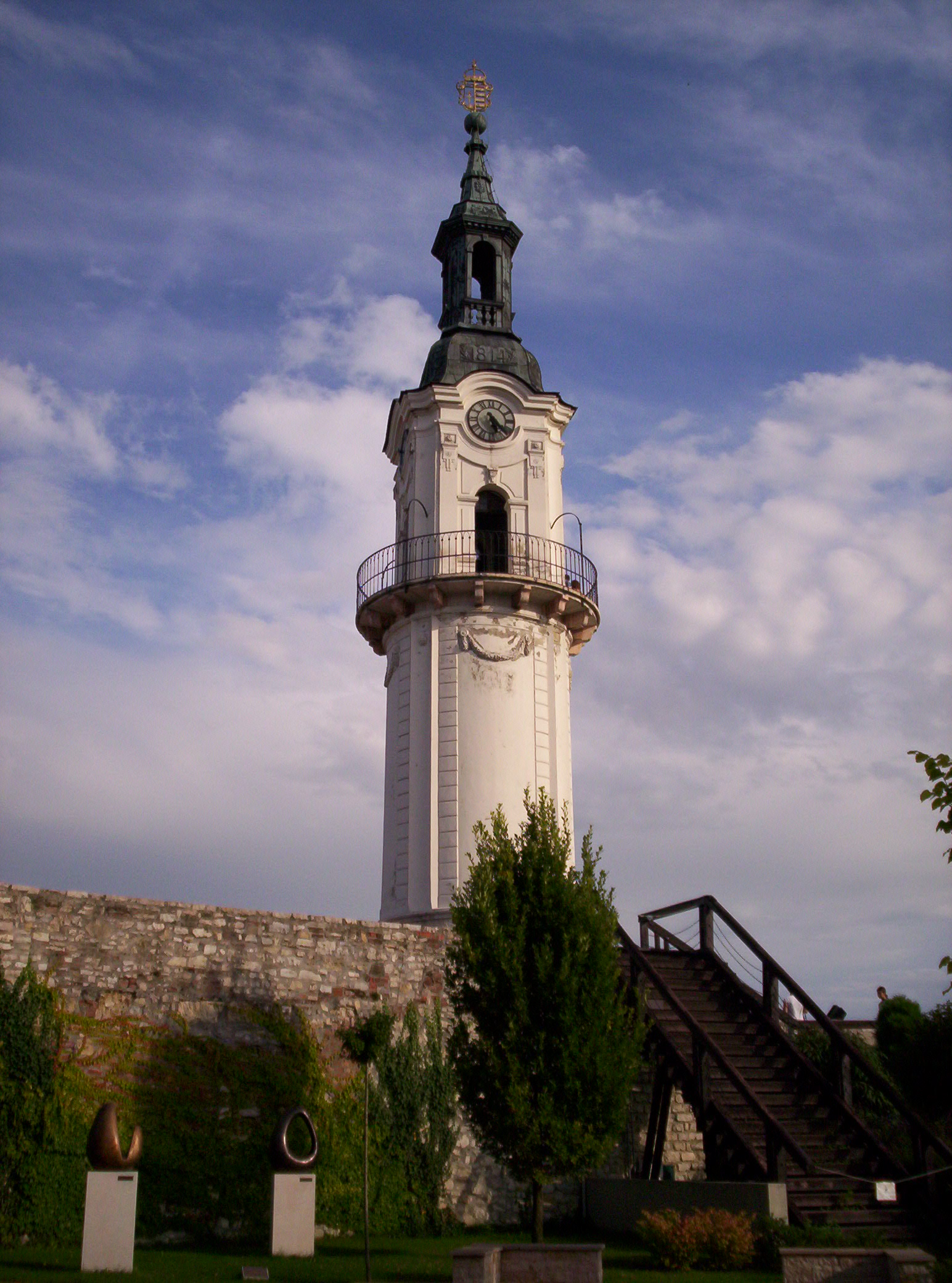
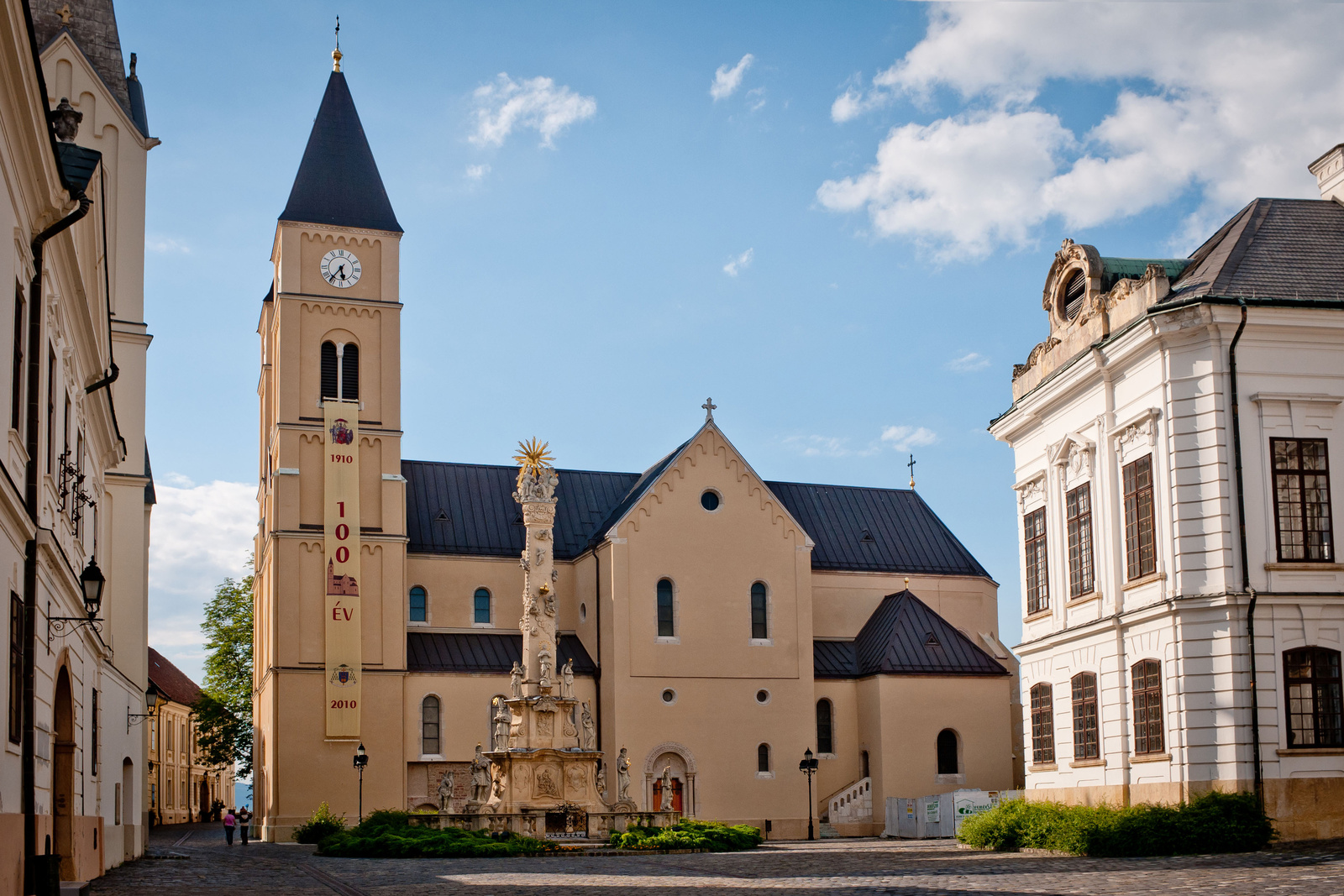
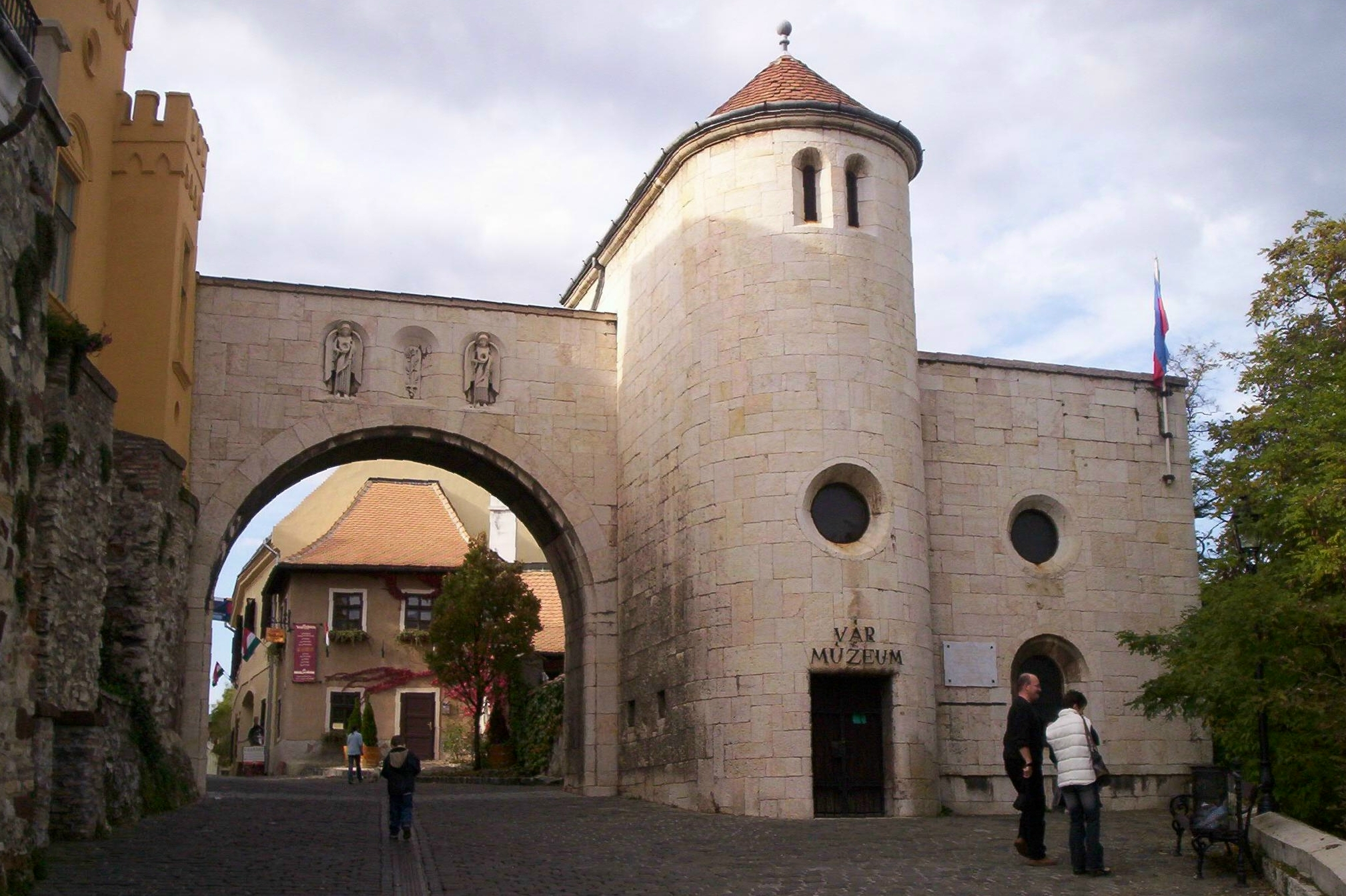
- From top, left to right: Castle Hill, County Library, Statue of King Stephen I and Queen Gisela, Fire-watch Tower, Veszprém Cathedral and Castle Gate

- Flag Coat of arms
- Nickname: City of Queens
- Interactive map of Veszprém
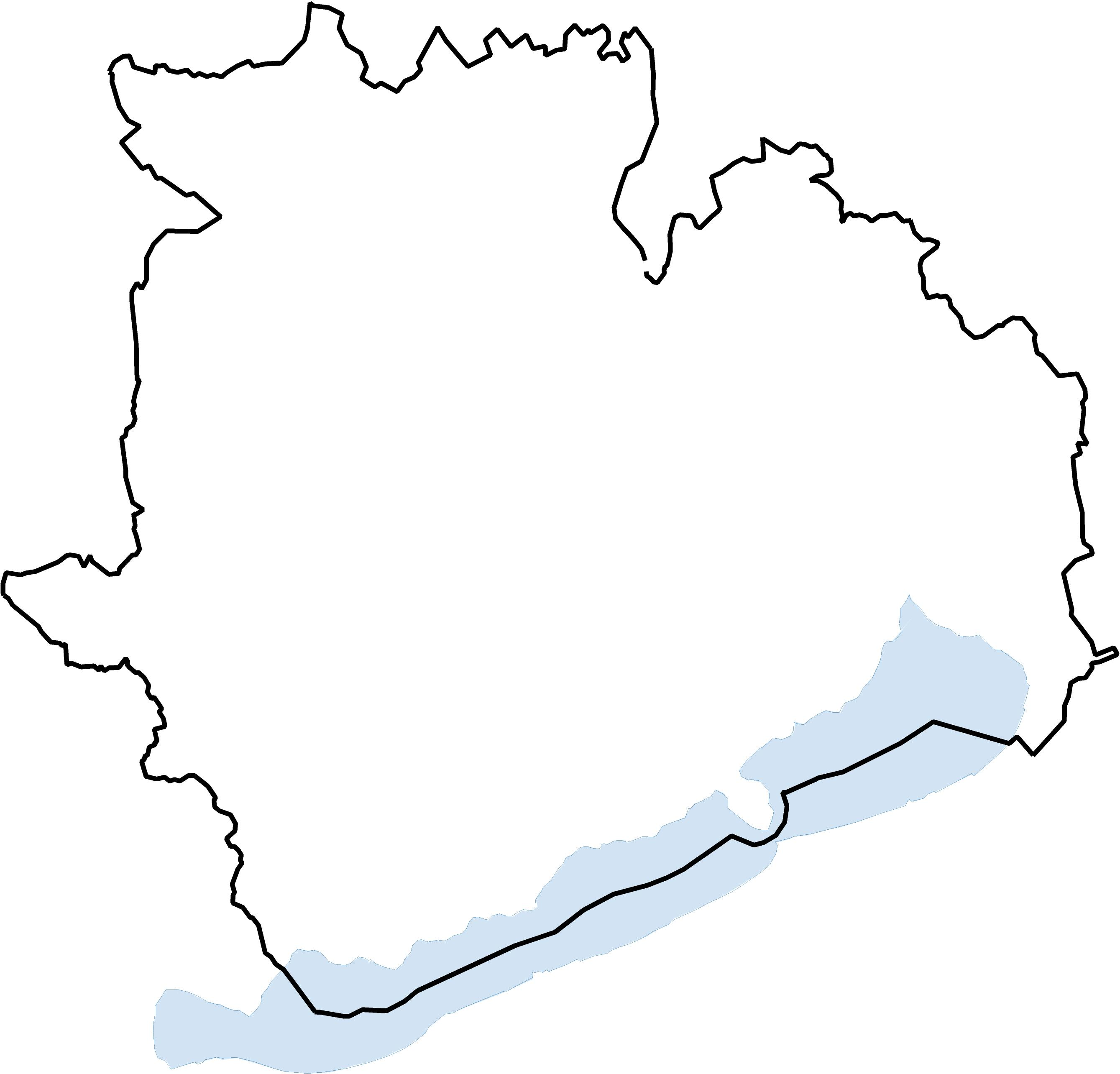
- Location within Veszprém County Location within Hungary
- Coordinates: 47.09296°N 17.91377°E
- Country: Hungary
- Region: Central Transdanubia
- County: Veszprém
- District: Veszprém
- Established: 9th century AD
- City status: 1870
- Named for: Bezprym of Poland

Government
  - Mayor: Gyula Porga (Fidesz–KDNP)
  - Deputy Mayor: List: Mária Brányi (Fidesz–KDNP); Lajos Némedi (Fidesz–KDNP)
  - Town Notary: Dr Gábor Mohos

Area
  - City with county rights: 126.93 km^{2} (49.01 sq mi)
- Elevation: 266 m (873 ft)

Population (1 January 2017)
  - City with county rights: 56,927
  - Rank: 16th
  - Density: 448.49/km^{2} (1,161.6/sq mi)
  - Urban: 133,880 (13th)
- Demonym: veszprémi

Population by ethnicity
  - Hungarians: 83.9%
  - Germans: 2.4%
  - Gypsies: 0.7%
  - Romanians: 0.1%
  - Serbs: 0.1%
  - Slovaks: 0.1%
  - Armenians: 0.1%
  - Bulgarians: 0.1%
  - Polish: 0.1%
  - Ukrainians: 0.1%

Population by religion
  - Roman Catholic: 38.9%
  - Greek Catholic: 0.3%
  - Calvinists: 7.0%
  - Lutherans: 2.1%
  - Other: 1.4%
  - Non-religious: 20.6%
  - Unknown: 29.6%
- Time zone: UTC+1 (CET)
  - Summer (DST): UTC+2 (CEST)
- Postal code: 8200
- Area code: (+36) 88
- Airport: Veszprém
- MP: Péter Ovádi (Fidesz)
- Website: veszprem.hu

Veszprém (Hungarian pronunciation: [ˈvɛspreːm]; German: Weißbrünn, Czech: Bezpřím, Slovak: Bezprím, Slovene: Belomost) is one of the oldest urban areas in Hungary, and a city with county rights. It lies approximately 15 km (9 mi) north of the Lake Balaton. It is the administrative center of the county of the same name.

== Etymology ==
The city's name derives from the West Slavic-language personal name Bezprem or Bezprym (Proto-Slavic Bezprěmъ) which translates literally to "stubborn", "self-confident, not willing to retreat". Besprem (before 1002), Vezprem (1086), Bezpremensis (1109). The form Vezprem originates in early medieval scribal habits and frequent exchange of B and V under the influence of the Greek language.

== Location and legend ==
The city can be reached via the M7 highway and Road 8. It can also be reached from Győr via Road 82 and from Székesfehérvár via Road 8. According to a local legend, Veszprém was founded on seven hills. The seven hills are Várhegy (Castle Hill), Benedek-hegy (St. Benedict Hill), Jeruzsálem-hegy (Jerusalem Hill), Temetőhegy (Cemetery Hill), Gulyadomb (Herd Hill), Kálvária-domb (Calvary Hill), and Cserhát.

== History ==
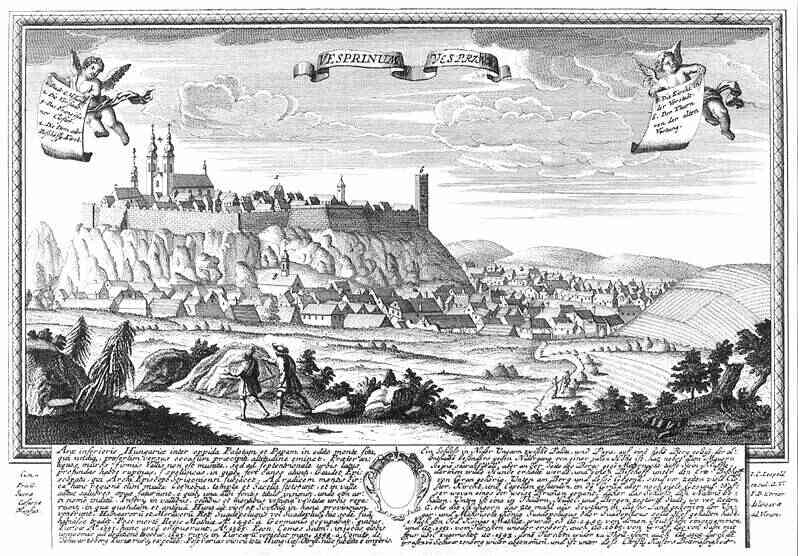

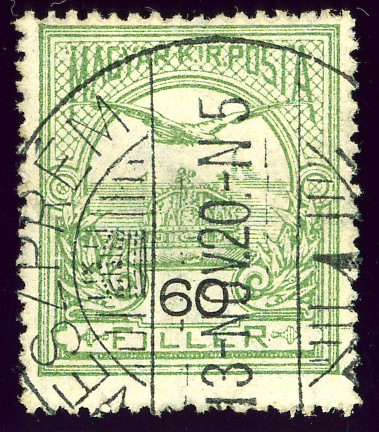
Veszprém in the Kingdom of Hungary in 1913

Anonymus Belæ Regis Notarius (the anonymous notary of King Béla III) wrote that a castle already stood here when the Hungarians first occupied the area. The castle was probably a 9th-century Frankish fortress. The castles of Veszprém, Esztergom and Székesfehérvár, were the earliest Hungarian stone castles, which had already been built during the reign of High Prince Géza, a time when motte castles were much more common.

Veszprém had an important religious role during the struggle to make Christianity the official religion of the medieval Kingdom of Hungary—Stephen I, Grand Prince of the Hungarians, was crowned King in 1000 or 1001, and defeated the armies of his chief opponent, Koppány, near Veszprém. The city became the first episcopal seat of Hungary in 1009 and an archiepiscopal seat in 1993. Comitatus Veszprém was one of the earliest historical counties of Hungary.

Veszprém was the favorite city of Queen Gisela, the wife of Stephen I. For centuries, the queens of Hungary were crowned by the bishop of Veszprém. The city is still often called "the city of queens". In the year 1294 Queen Fenenna confirmed that, at that time, the former Queen Elizabeth had the privilege to collect the donations of the church in the Veszprém County.

Veszprém was among the first Hungarian cities to have a university—students studied law and arts here for several centuries. The university was destroyed by fire in 1276, when Peter I Csák invaded and devastated the Diocese of Veszprém. Veszprém became a university town again in the 20th century.

The Ottoman siege of Veszprém in September 1593 during the Long Turkish War

The town was taken over by the Ottoman Turks during the Hungarian–Ottoman Wars in 1552, but was conquered by the Habsburgs in 1566. The Ottomans once again successfully besieged the town in 1593 during the Long Turkish War. The castle was demolished in 1706. Until 1918, Veszprim (also named Weszprim and Wesprim c. 1850, and Weissbrunn in German) was part of the Austrian monarchy (Austria-Hungary); and part of Transleithania in the Kingdom of Hungary after the compromise of 1867. From 16 August and 4 October 1919, Romanian troops occupied the city under colonel Constantin Neagu and major Alexander Totescu.

During World War II, Veszprém was captured by Soviet troops of the 3rd Ukrainian Front on 23 March 1945, in the course of the Vienna Offensive.

== Economy ==
The Hungarian automotive plastic spare parts manufacturer Videoton Plastic (part of Videoton), the Hungarian kiosk manufacturer Kiosksystems, the Hungarian shutter manufacturer Roll-Lux, the Hungarian label manufacturer Imprenta, the Hungarian tool manufacturer Solidsteel, the Hungarian technical ceramics manufacturer Bakony Ipari Kerámia, the Hungarian furniture manufacturer Balaton Bútor, the Hungarian machine manufacturer Flexmont, the Hungarian watermanagement company PureAqua, the Hungarian automotive spare parts manufacturer Win-Pres, the Hungarian construction company VEMÉVSZER, the Hungarian metal manufacturer Ferro-Trio, the Hungarian OOK Printhouse, the Hungarian toolmanufacturer Plasticor, the Hungarian machine manufacturer Transmoduls, the Hungarian Prospektus Printhouse have both their headquarters and main production facilities in Veszprém.

The French pharmaceutical company Citoxlab, the Austrian plaster manufacturer Lasselsberger-Knauf, the Swiss electric motor manufacturer Maxon Motor, the Austrian tile manufacturer Bramac, the French automotive spare parts manufacturer Valeo, the German electromagnetical controlsystems manufacturer nass magnet, the German automotive spare parts manufacturer Continental AG, the German automotive spare parts manufacturer Thun, the German sensor manufacturer Pepperl+Fuchs, the Austrian chimney and ventilation system manufacturer Schiedel, the American power supply security company CoreComm, the German sensor manufacturer Balluff, the German automotive spare parts manufacturer Jost, the German health devices manufacturer Beurer, the British-Dutch food producer Unilever and the Hungarian dairy product manufacturer Pannontej operate production plants in the city.

The Dutch General Logistics Systems, the Hungarian Magyar Posta, the German Penny Market, the Hungarian Locargo and the Austrian Persped have logistics centres there.

The Hungarian owned Vöröskő electrical retailer (holder of the brand Euronics in Hungary) is also based in the city.

The Veszprém Aréna provides place besides sport events for exhibitions and conferences.

== Demographics ==
According to the 2011 census beside the 83.9% Hungarian majority the city has a historical German minority numbering 2.4% of the population. The second largest ethnic group is the Roma with 0.7%. The others are all marginal.

The religious affiliation of the citizens has a Catholic majority with 38.9% Roman Catholic and 0.3% Greek Catholic. The Calvinists (7.0%) have the second, the Lutherans (2.1%) the third largest denomination in the city. 20.6% are not religious.

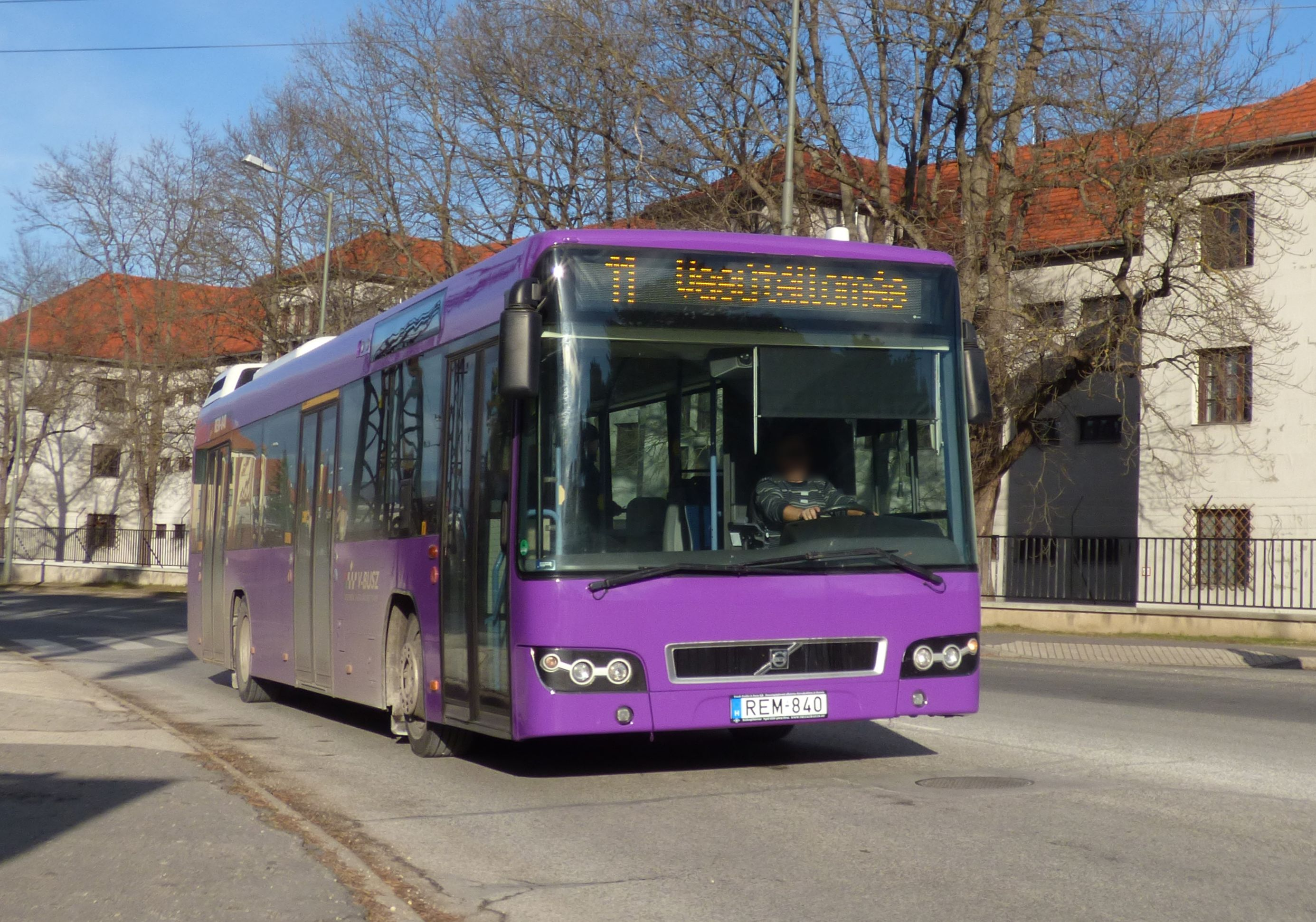
Volvo 7700 on Line 11 operated by V-Busz

== Politics ==
The current mayor of Veszprém is Gyula Porga (Fidesz-KDNP).

The local Municipal Assembly, elected at the 2019 local government elections, is made up of 18 members (1 Mayor, 12 Individual constituencies MEPs and 5 Compensation List MEPs) divided into this political parties and alliances:

Party	Seats	Current Municipal Assembly
Fidesz-KDNP	11	M
Opposition coalition (Note: Coalition of DK-Jobbik-LMP-MSZP-Momentum-Dialogue.)	7	

== Neighborhoods ==
=== Historical background ===
Until the end of the Middle Ages, Veszprém was essentially a group of settlements — known as “szegek” — located around the castle hill. The “szegek”, which had previously been independent settlements, were completely destroyed during the Ottoman period; thus, there is no continuity between the medieval and early modern city districts and their names. During the dynamic phases of urban development in the 19th and 20th centuries, the earlier settlement merged. The administrative and service needs (e.g., schools, stores, etc.) of the urban area, which had expanded and become more densely populated in this way, necessitated the establishment of a so-called urban structural system, for which proposals were made in the continuously updated urban development plans (1960, 1970, 1982). Due to the slowing of urban growth in the 21st century, a system based on tradition has become more practical than these plans.

=== Veszprém's official neighborhoods ===
In Municipal Decree No. 33/1997, the Municipality of Veszprém, a City with County Rights, distinguished 14 city neighborhoods and 11 territorial units that are not classified as city neighborhoods. The latter are partly separated as subdivisions of certain city districts and partly appear outside of them, functioning similarly to city neighborhoods.

== Public transport ==
The city's public transportation consists exclusively of buses, which are run by the city-funded company V-Busz. 30 bus lines run throughout the city, including lines 44 and 45 which are night buses. All buses are easily recognizable even from a distance due to their purple livery. Tickets can be purchased on the buses, from ticket machines across the city and at bus stations from the ticket desks. V-Busz took over the city's public transportation in 2018 from the regional, state-funded bus company (ÉNYKK) due to a lack of funding and an old rolling stock of buses, some of which were from the mid 80s.

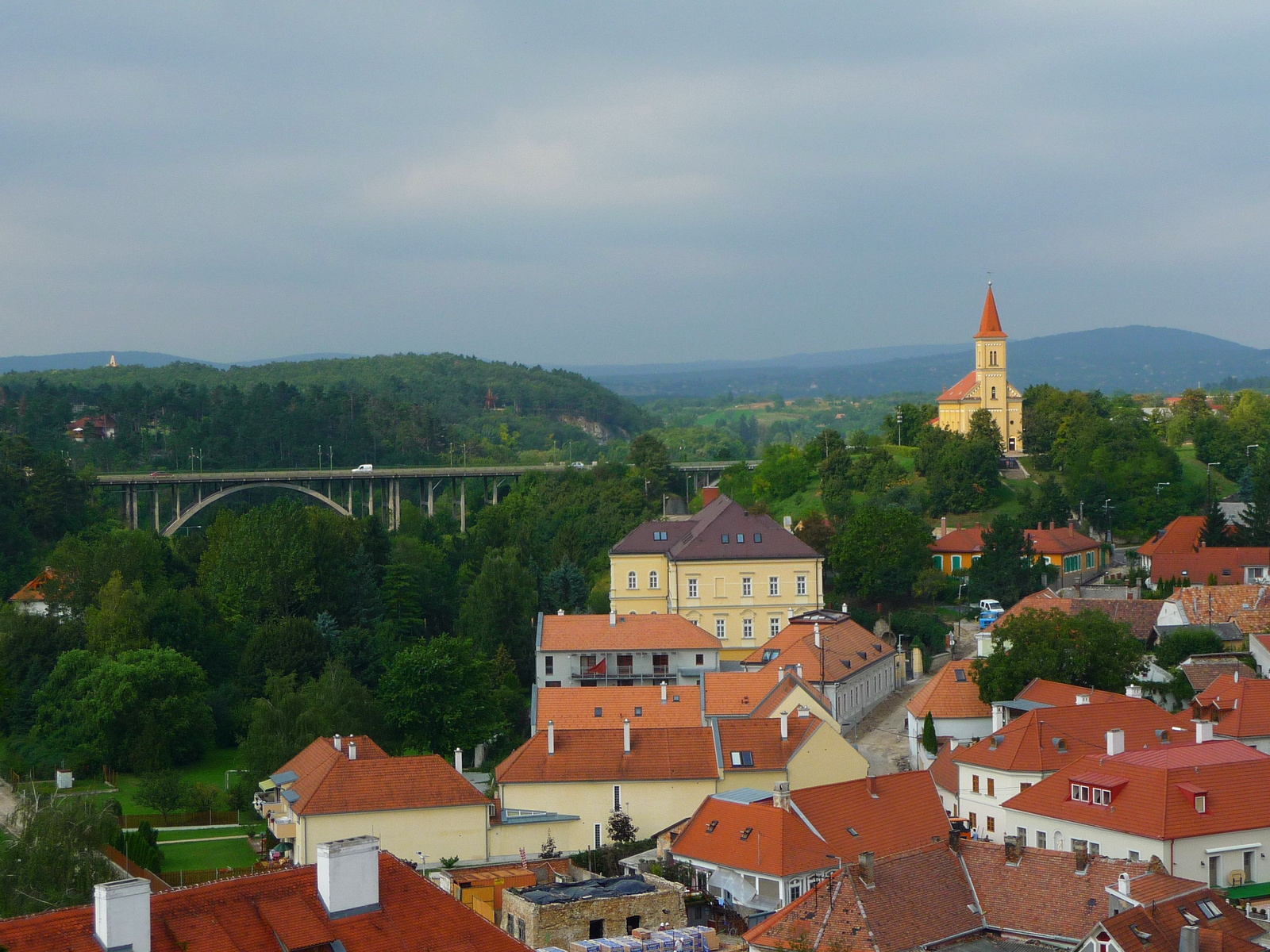
Szent István valley bridge and surroundings

== Notable people ==
Historical population
Year	Pop.	±%
1870	14,279	—
1880	14,726	+3.1%
1890	14,807	+0.6%
1900	16,223	+9.6%
1910	16,864	+4.0%
1920	17,513	+3.8%
1930	19,991	+14.1%
1941	24,025	+20.2%
1949	20,682	−13.9%
1960	28,222	+36.5%
1970	40,415	+43.2%
1980	57,249	+41.7%
1990	63,867	+11.6%
2001	62,851	−1.6%
2011	61,721	−1.8%
2022	56,262	−8.8%

- Péter Andorka (born in 1984), footballer
- Leopold Auer (1845–1930), violinist, academic, conductor and composer
- Virág Blazsek (born in 1980), lawyer, legal scholar
- Tamás Kádár (born 1990), footballer
- Attila Mesterházy (born 1974), politician (MSZP)
- Tibor Navracsics (born 1966), politician, European Commissioner for Education, Culture, Multilingualism and Youth (2014–present)
- Leopold Óváry (1833–1919), historian and archivist
- Csaba Vastag (born 1982), singer
- Tamás Vastag (born 1991), singer
- Ádám Lang (born 1993), footballer

== Twin towns – sister cities ==
Veszprém is twinned with:

- Bottrop, Germany
- Debeljača, Serbia
- Gladsaxe, Denmark
- Most, Czech Republic
- Nitra, Slovakia
- Ottignies-Louvain-la-Neuve, Belgium
- Passau, Germany
- Rovaniemi, Finland
- Senftenberg, Germany
- Sfântu Gheorghe, Romania
- Tartu, Estonia
- Tirat Carmel, Israel
- Žamberk, Czech Republic
- Płock, Poland

== Tourism ==
- Kittenberger Kálmán Zoo & Botanical Garden

== Gallery ==
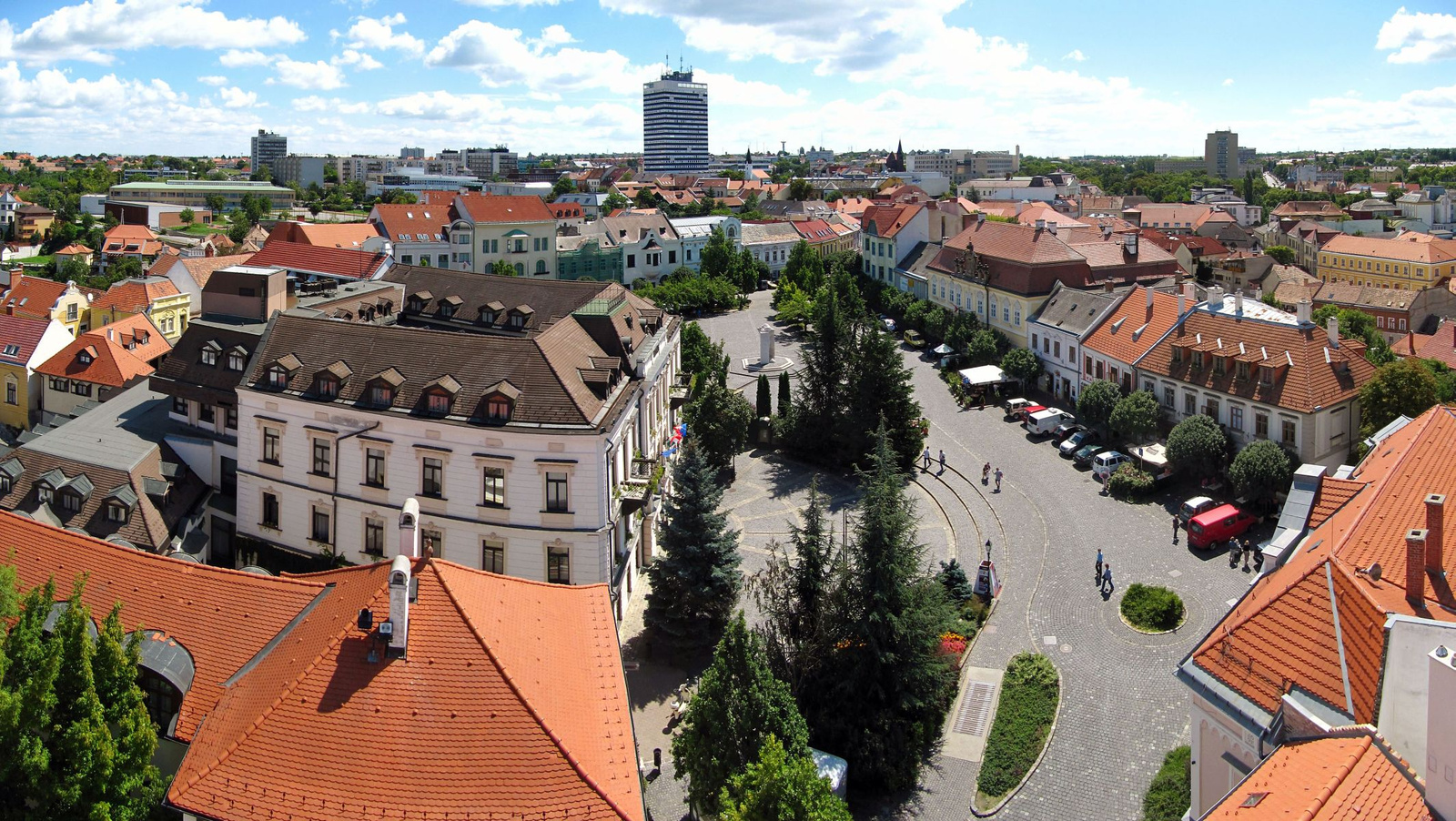
View of the city

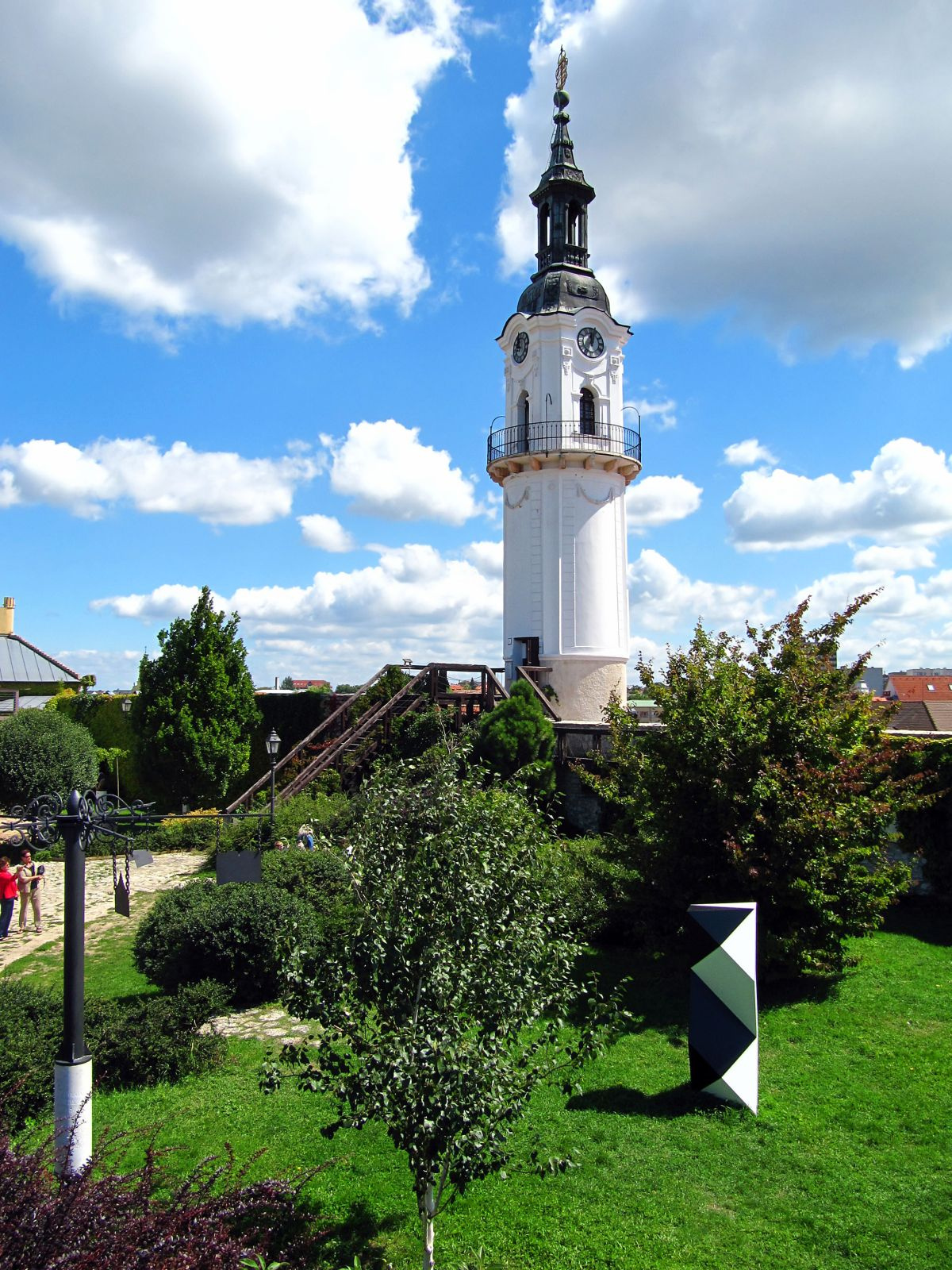
Fire-watch tower

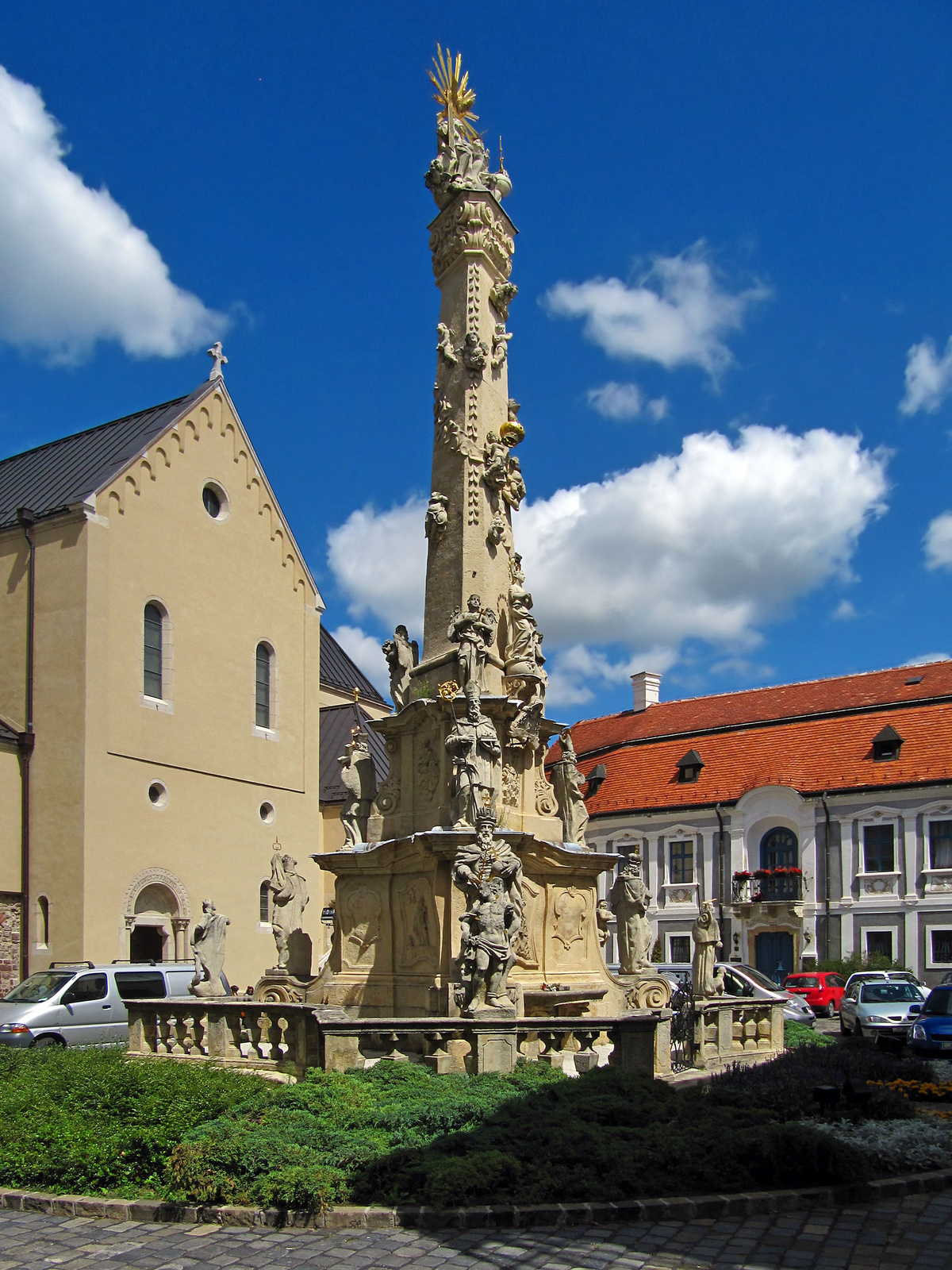
Holy Trinity Column

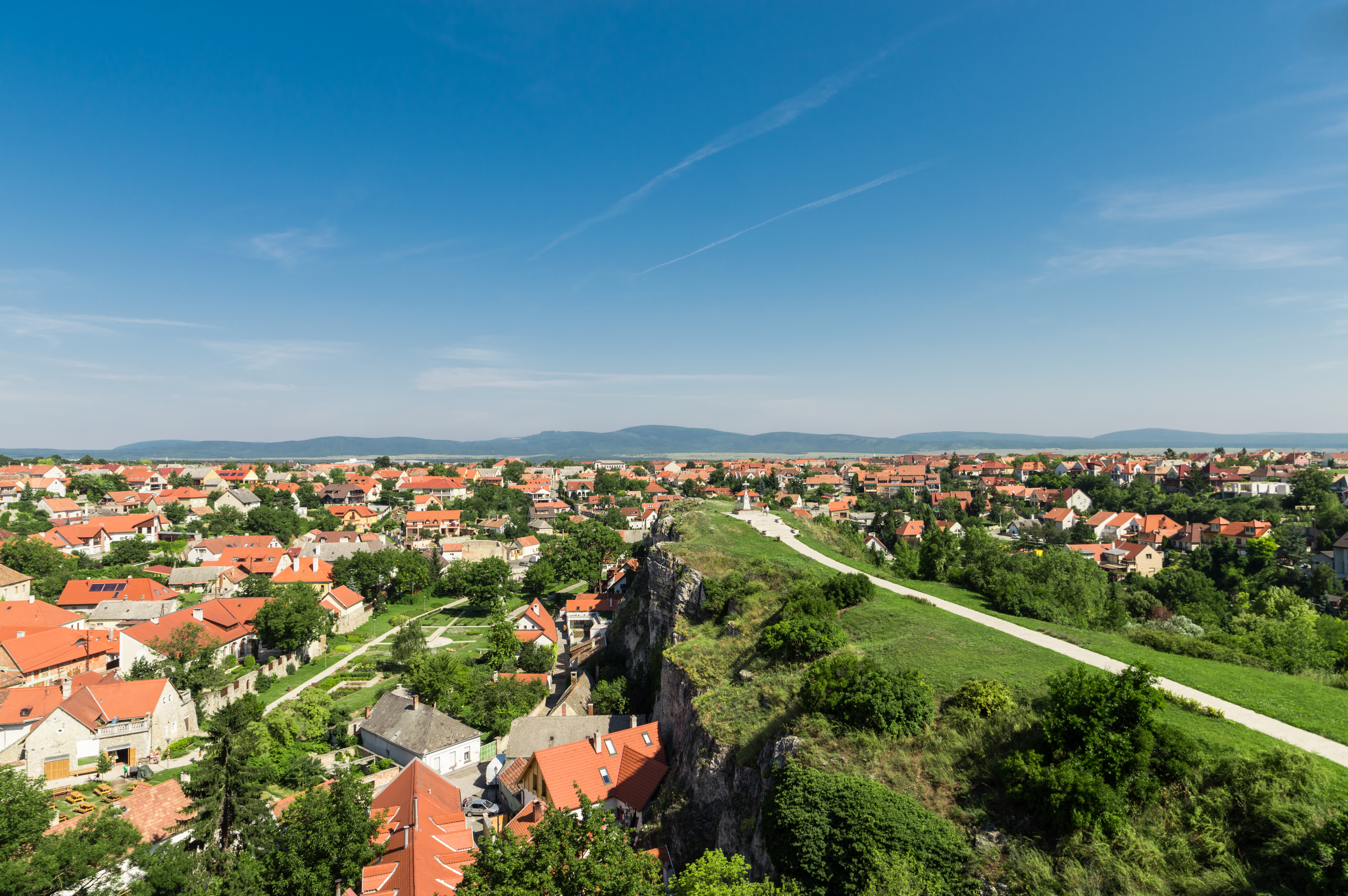
View from the Castle Hill

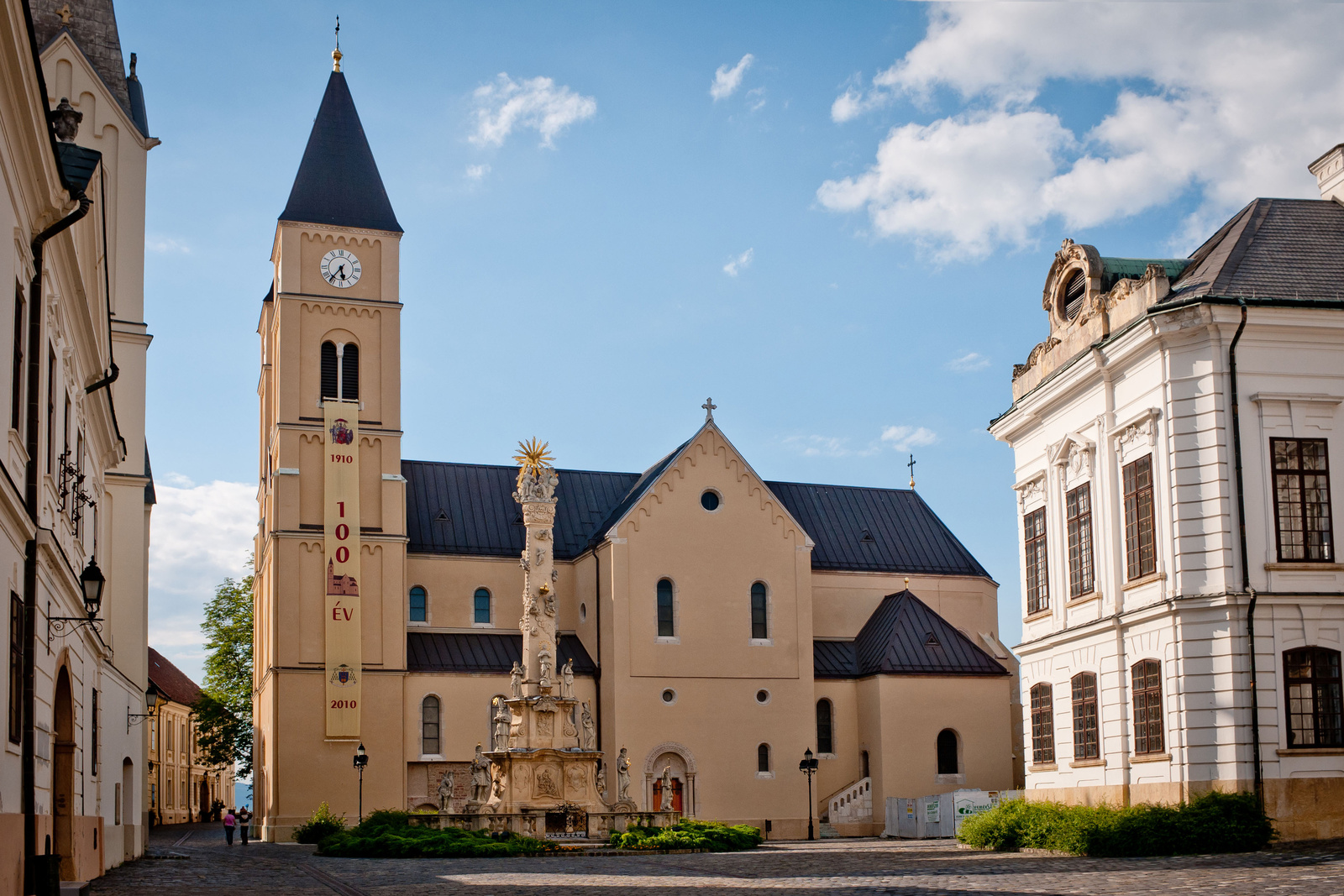
St. Michael's Cathedral, Veszprém

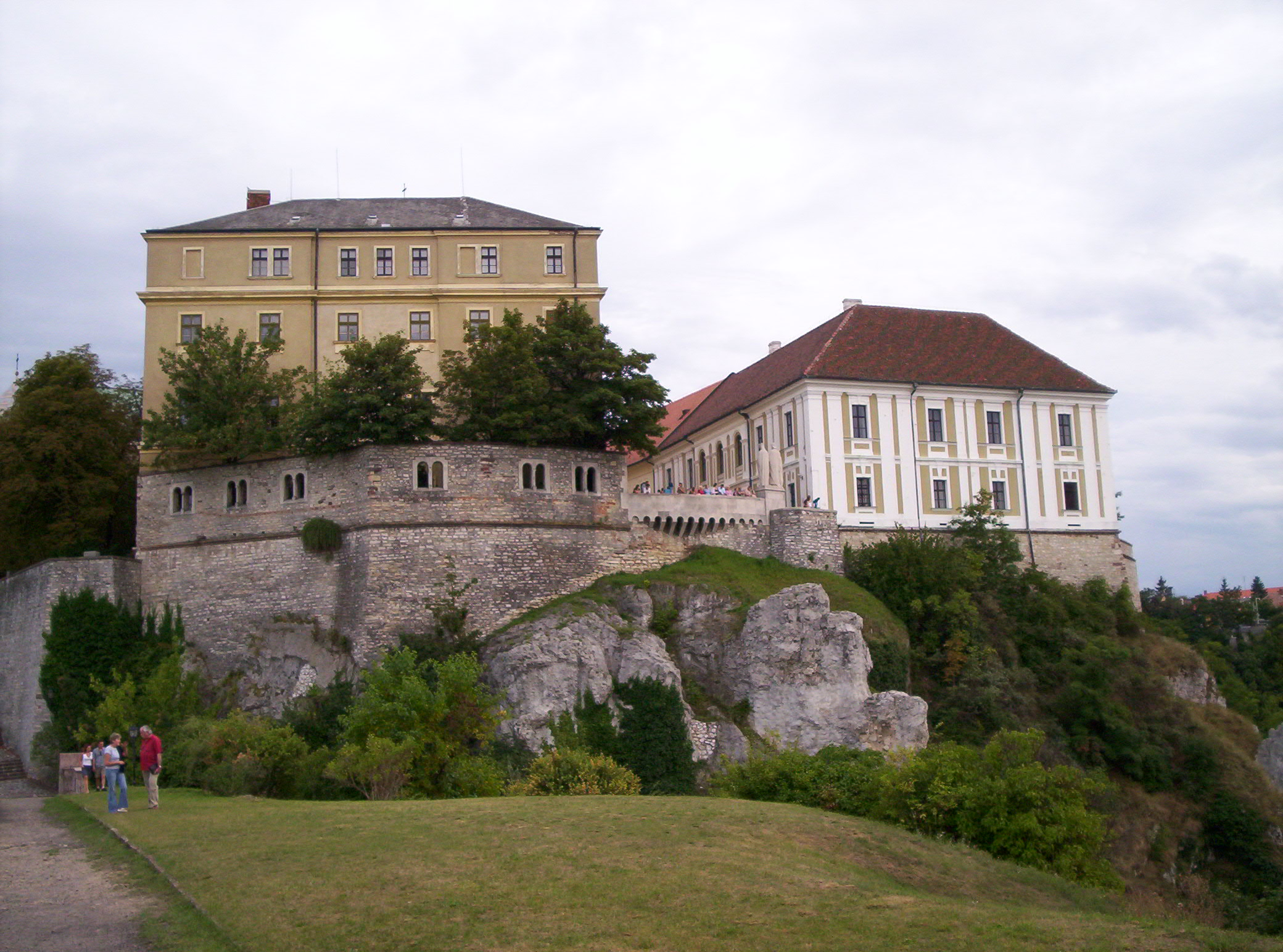
Castle Hill

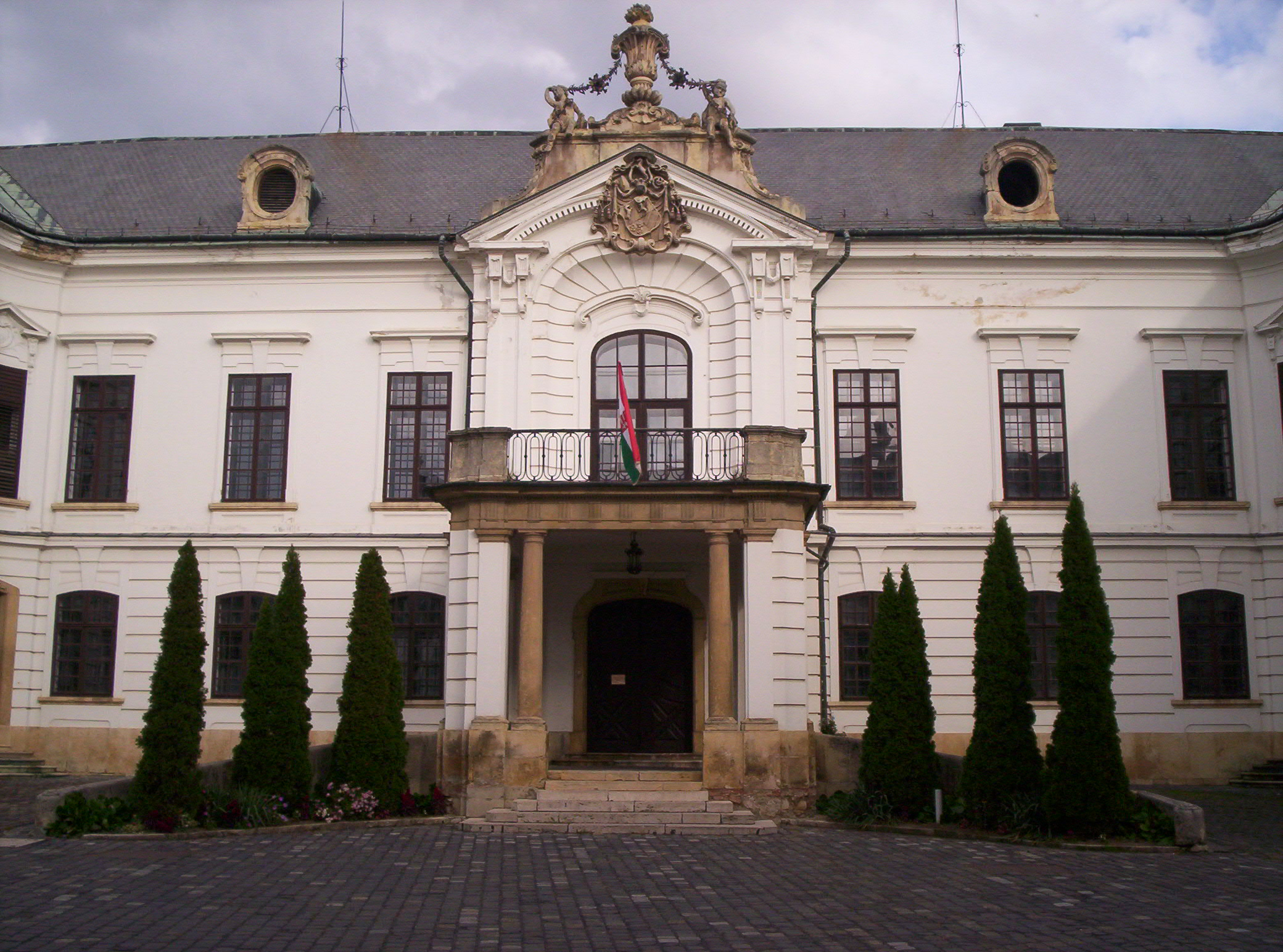
Episcopal Palace

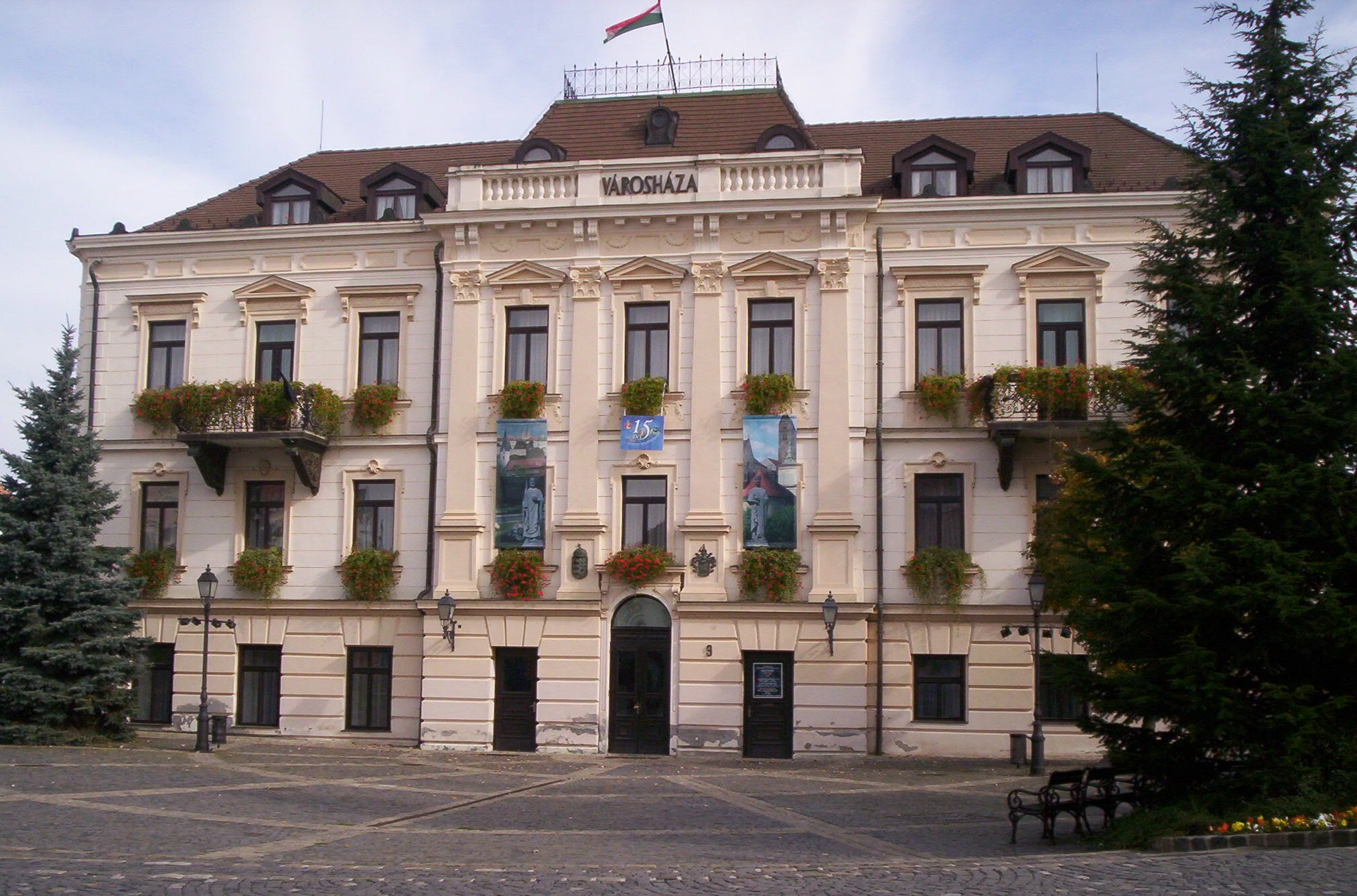
City hall

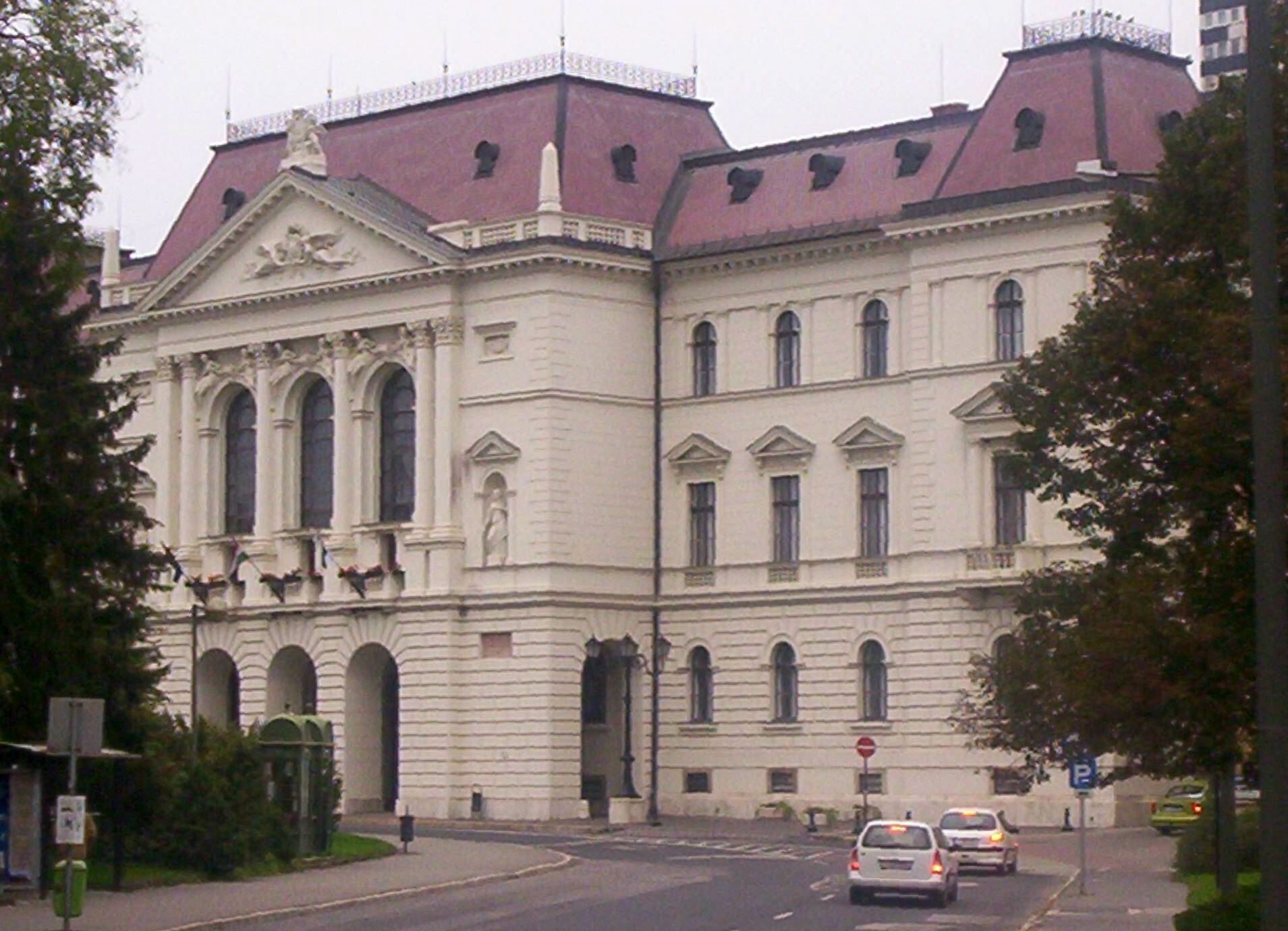
Veszprém County Hall

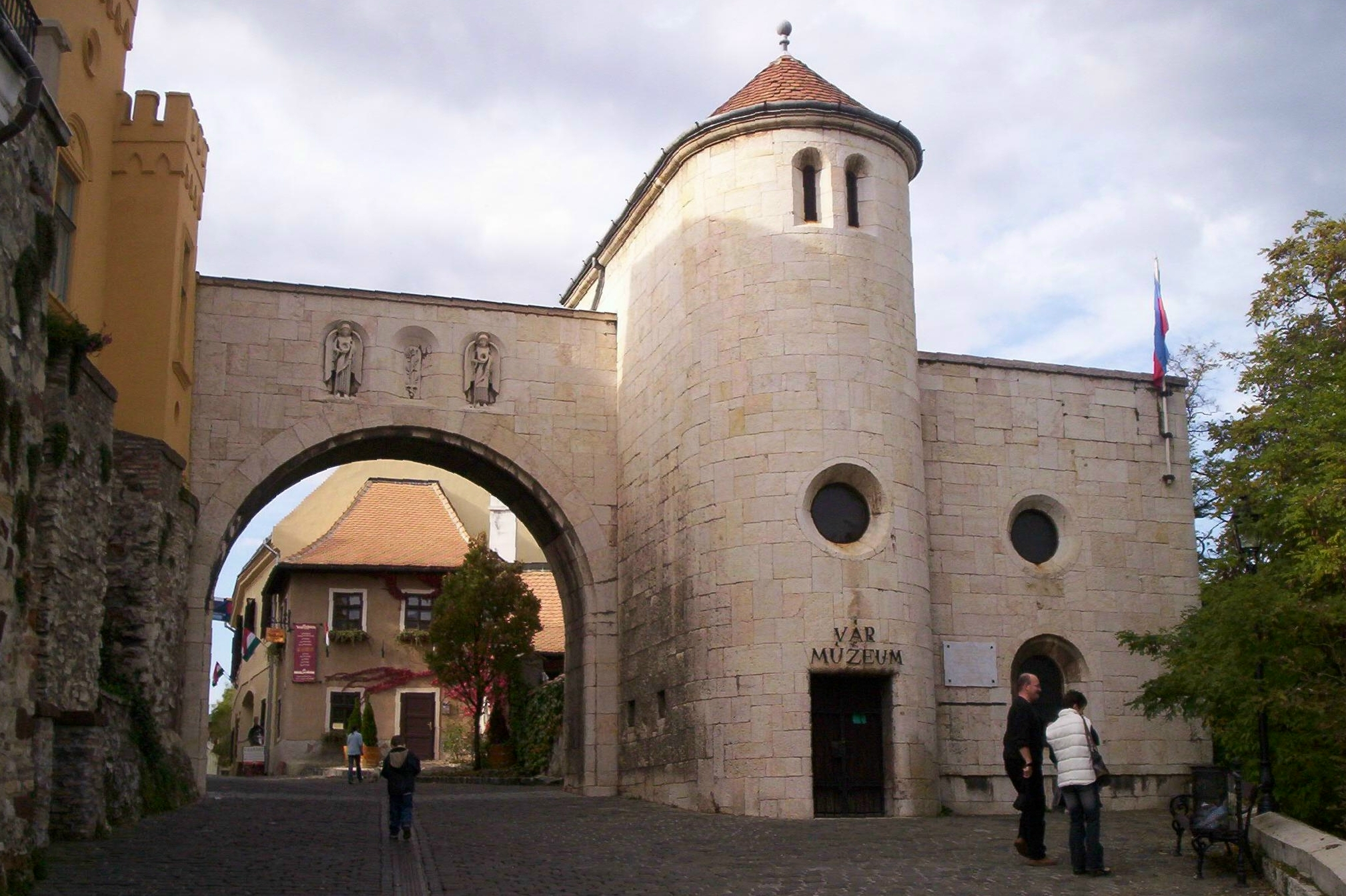
Castle gate

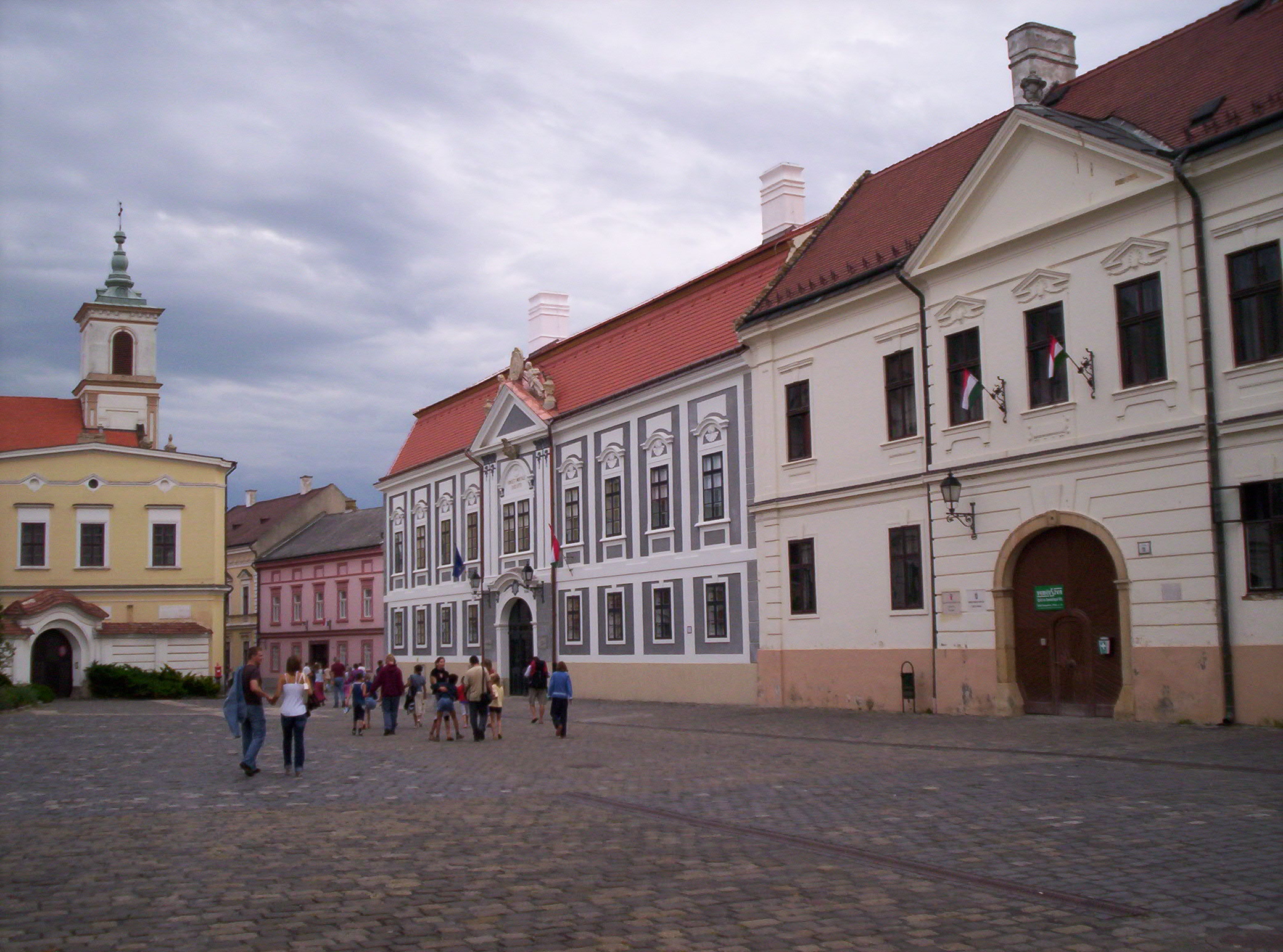
Holy Trinity Square

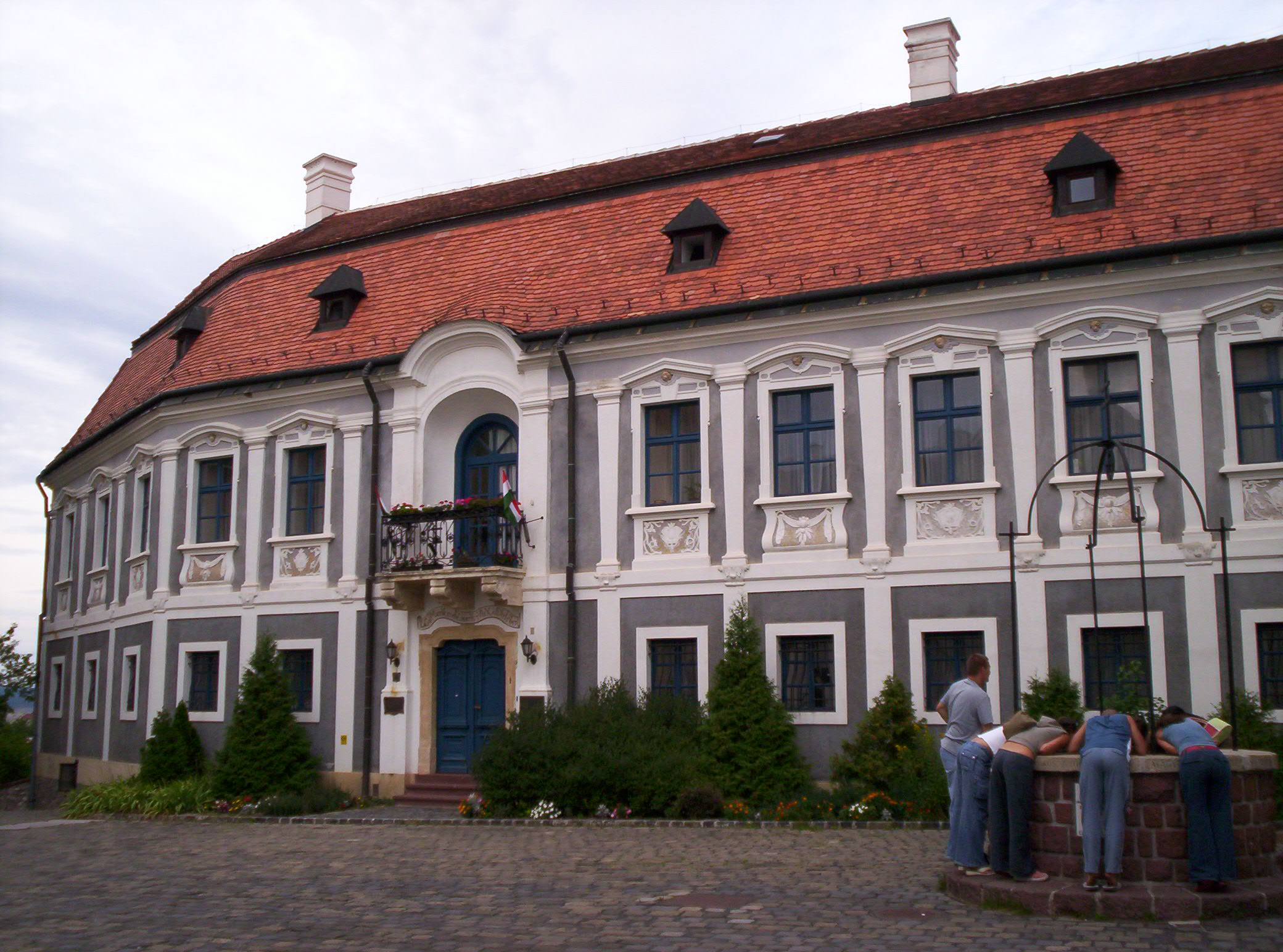
Nagypréposti Palace

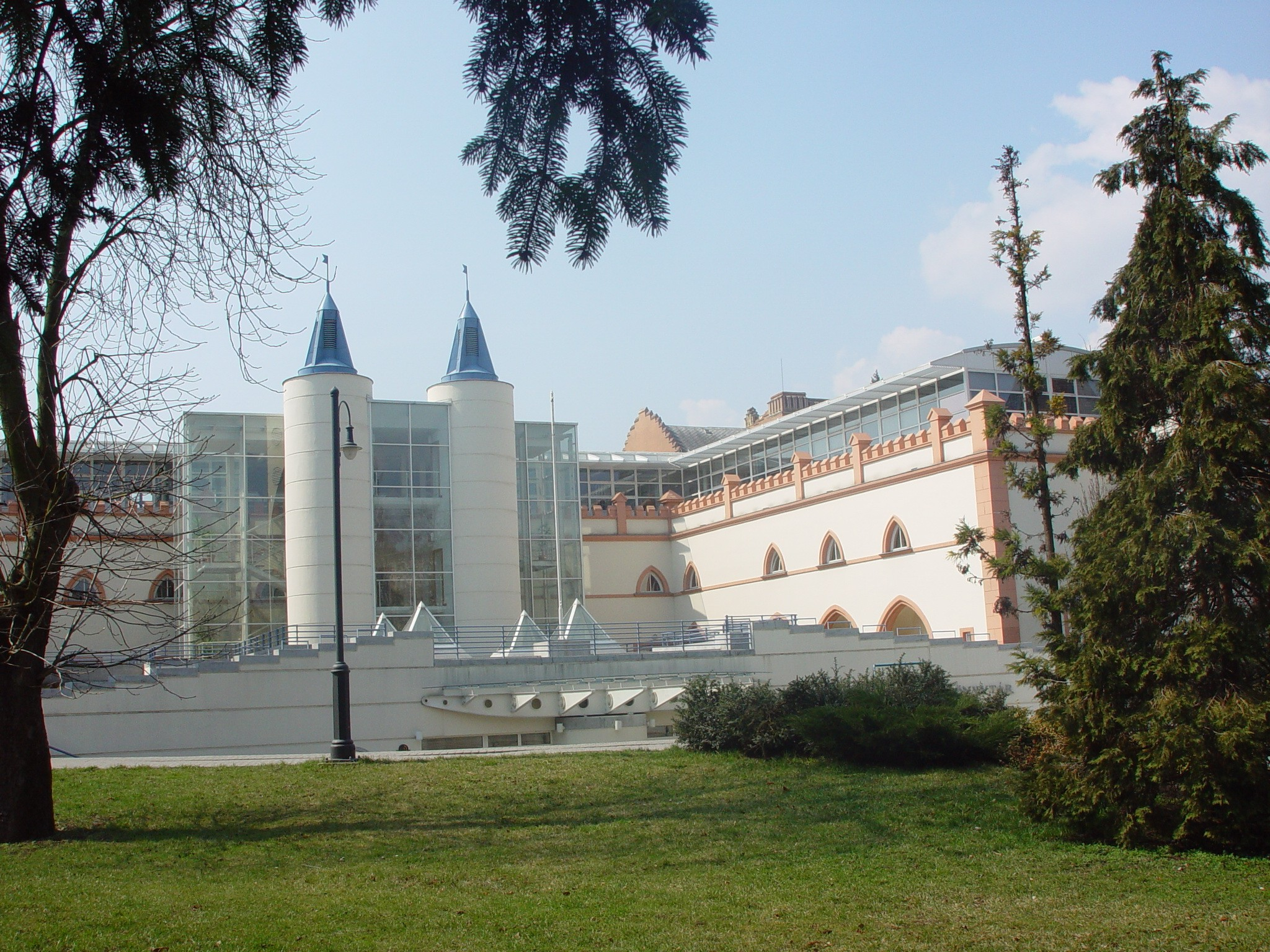
Library of Veszprém

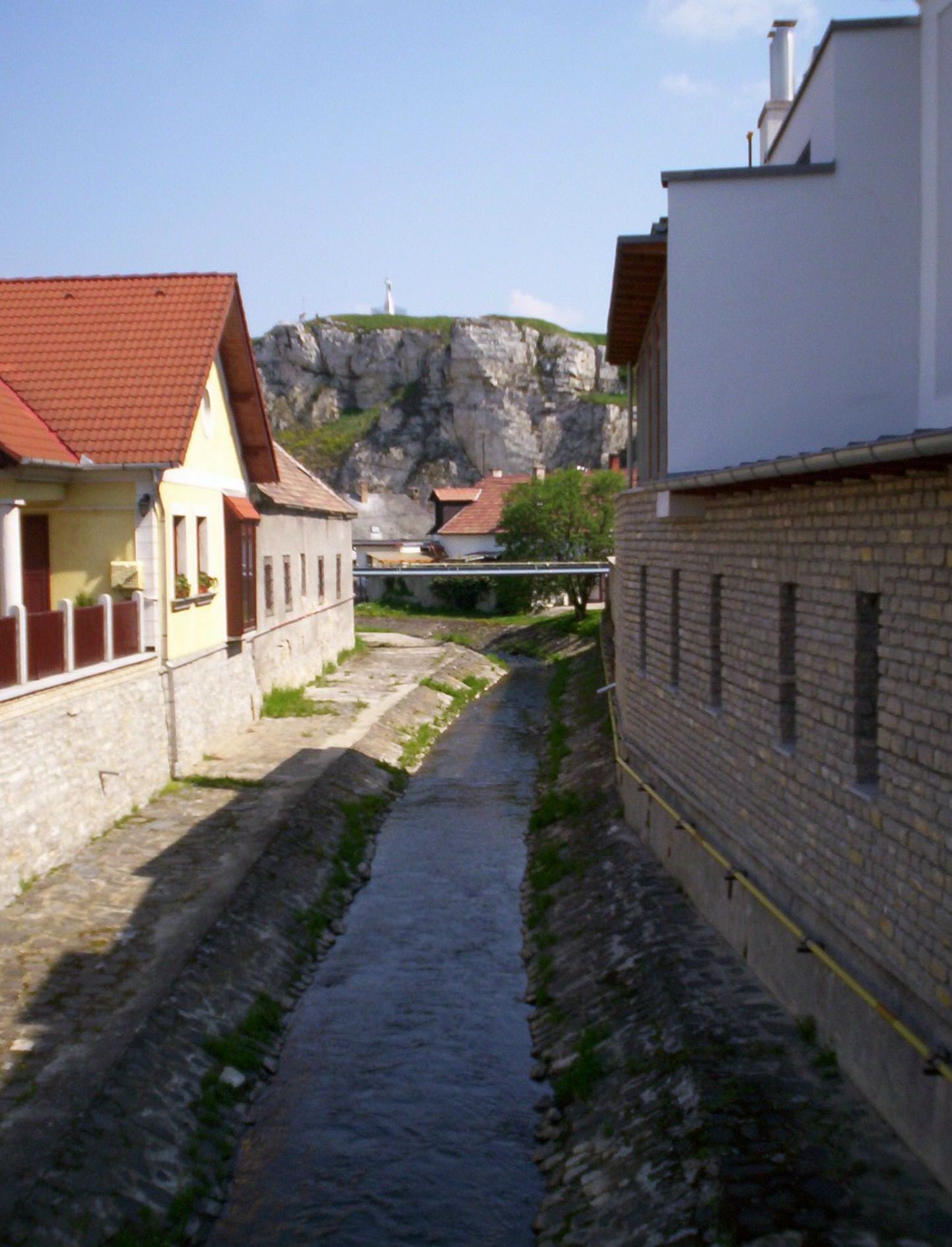
Séd Stream

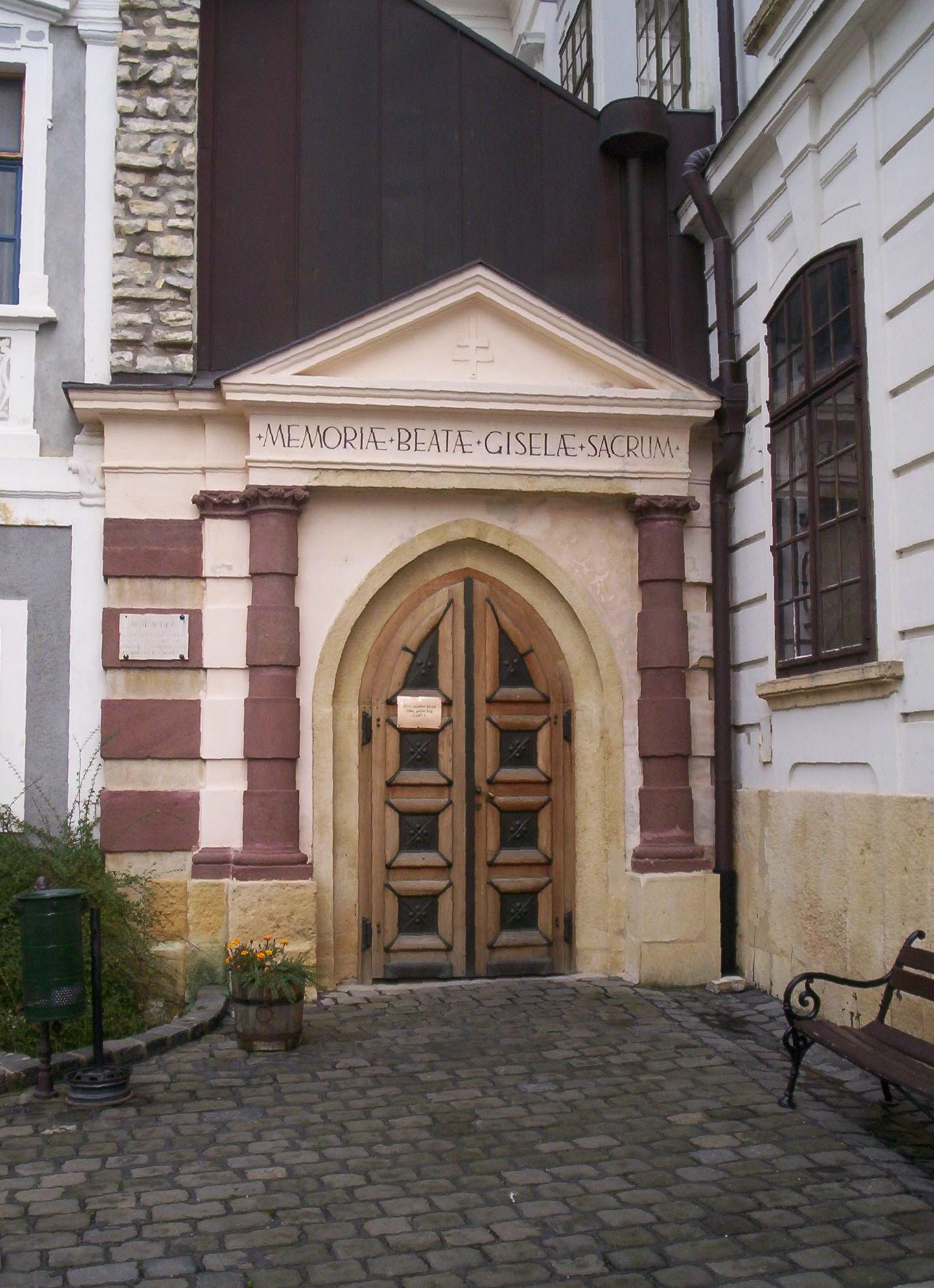
Gisela Capel

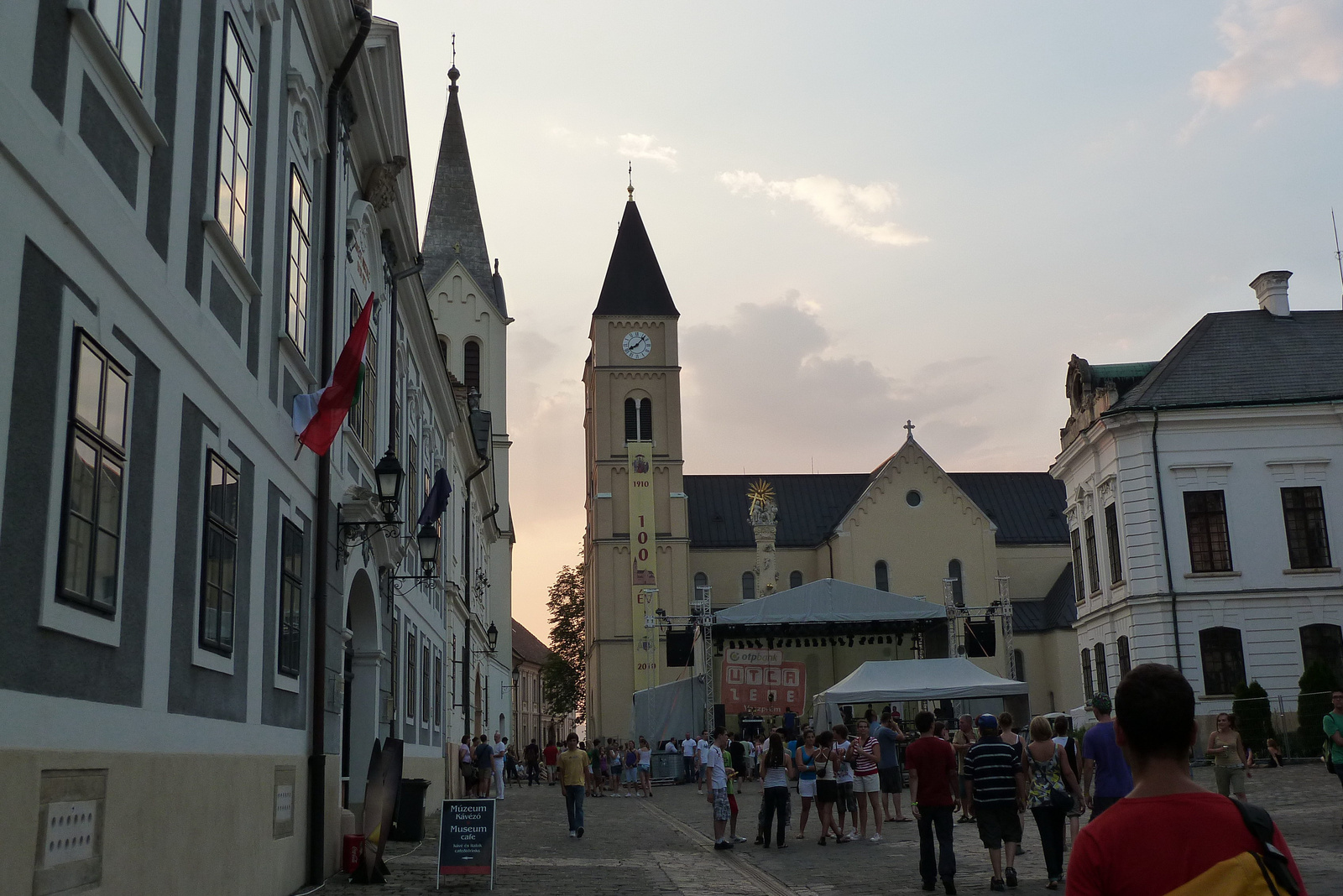
The Holy Trinity Square behind St. Michael's Cathedral, Veszprém in the Castle Hill

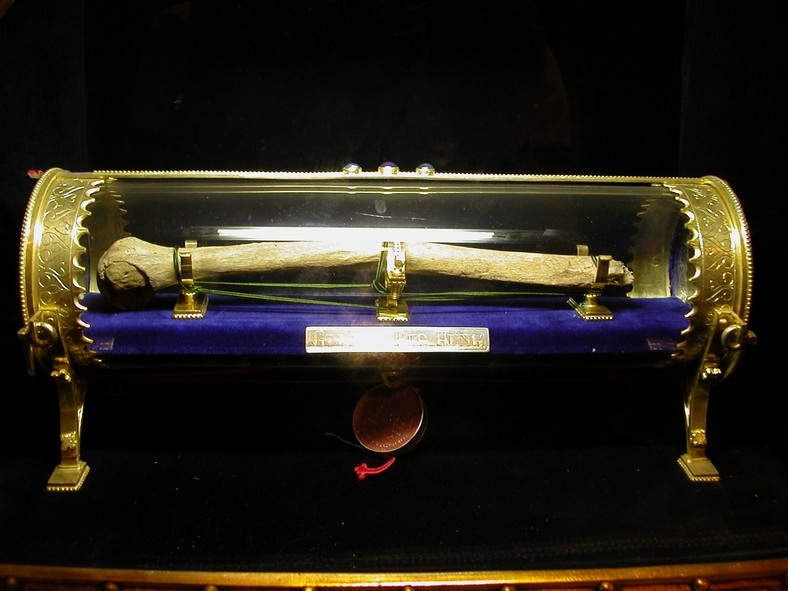
Bone of Queen Gisela kept in a church in Veszprém

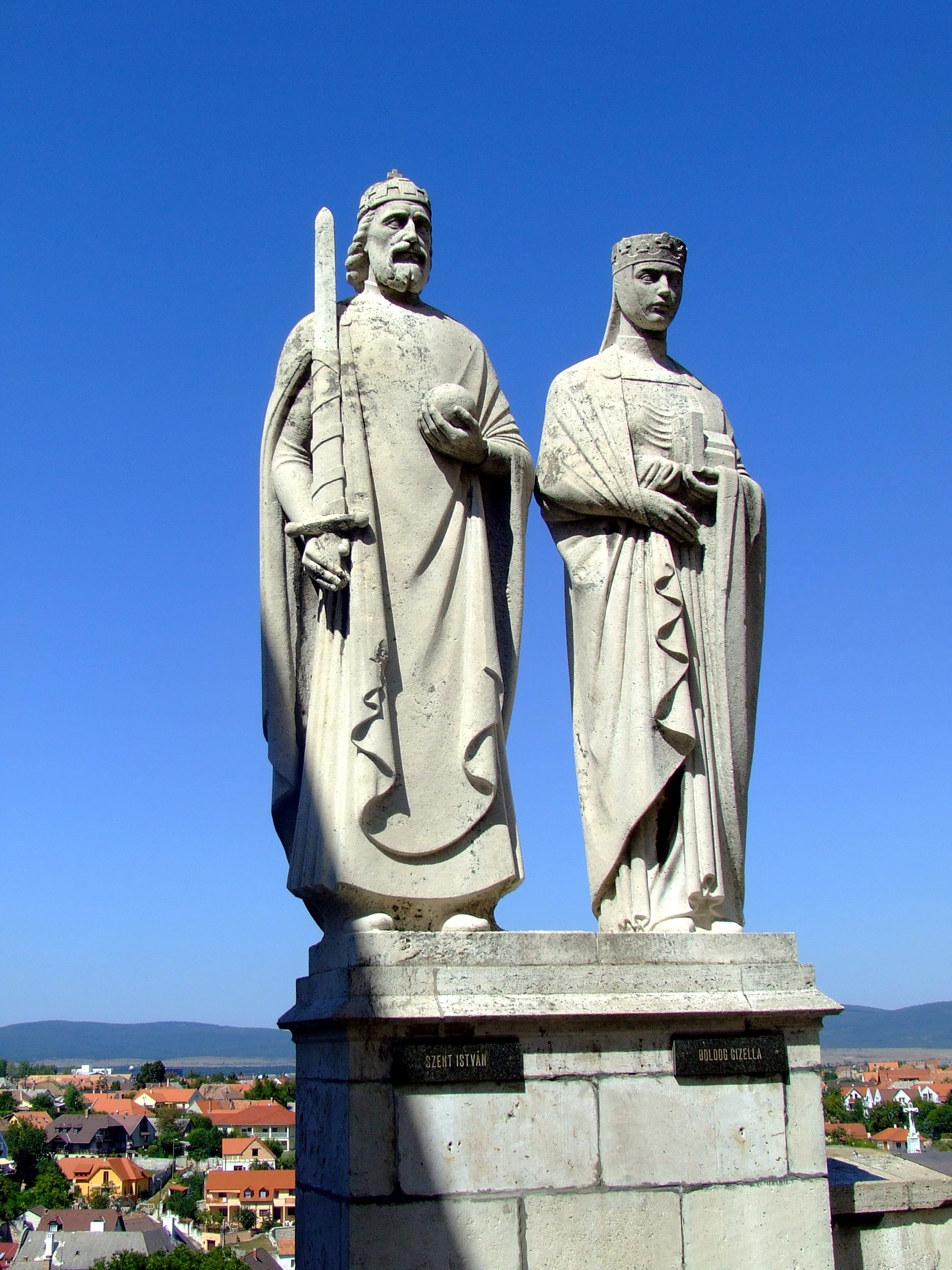
Statue of King Stephen I and Queen Gisela
