= Beurer =

Manufacturing company in Germany

- Trade name: Beurer GmbH
- Type: Limited (GmbH)
- Founded: 1919
- Founder: Eugen and Käthe Beurer
- Headquarters: Ulm, Germany
- Key people: Marco Bühler Sebastian Kebbe Oliver Neuschl
- Revenue: €397 million (2022/23)
- Number of employees: 1700 (2024)
- Website: www.beurer.com

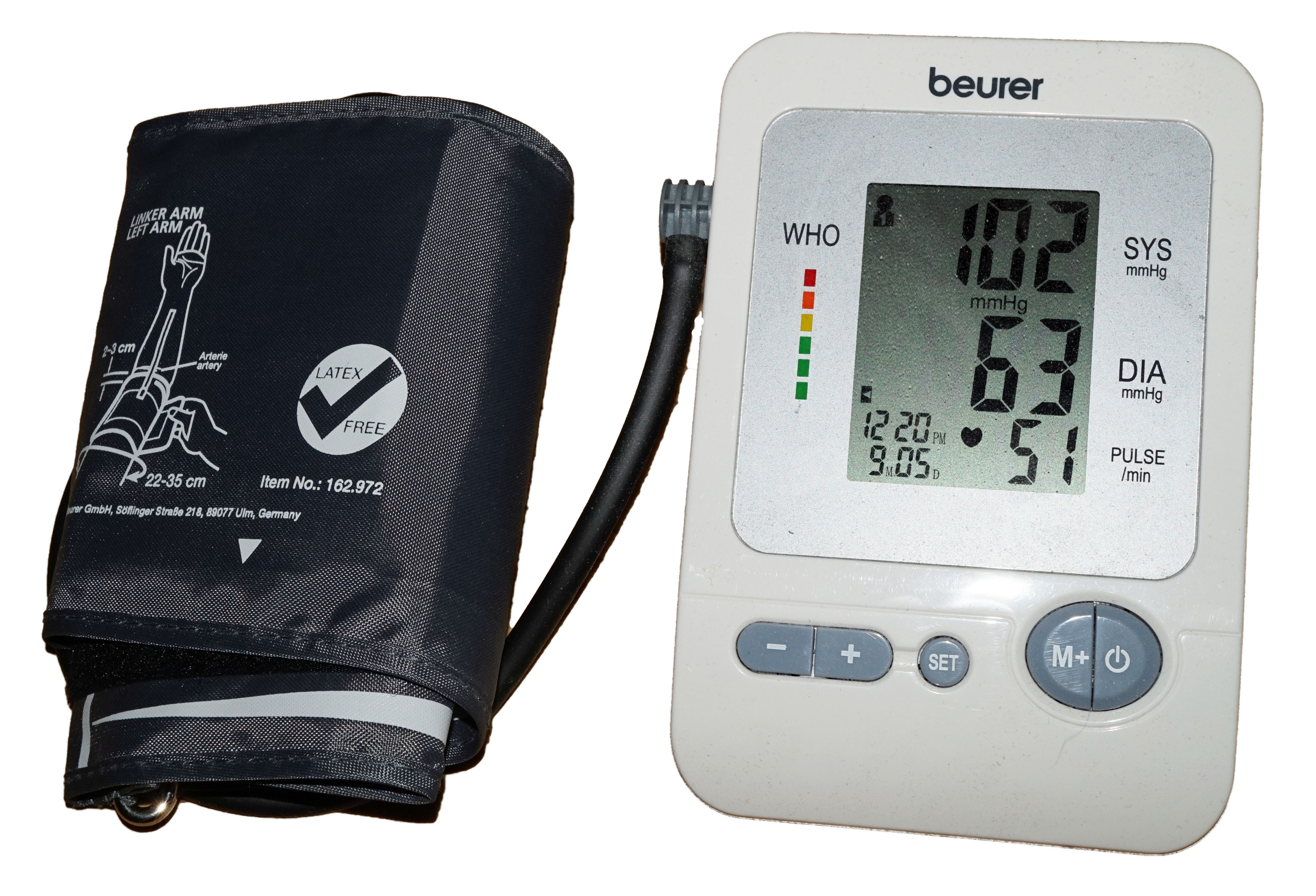
Beurer BM26 sphygmomanometer

Beurer GmbH is a German family-owned Mittelstand manufacturer of electrical devices for health and well-being. Originally a manufacturer of electric blankets, the company began diversifying its product line in the 1980s and now sell some 2,200 products including weighing scales, blood pressure monitors, and mobile ECG devices. Founded in Ulm in 1919, the company in 2016 employed 800 people and had revenues of about 230 million Euro. Production was based in Uttenweiler since 1963 but was shifted to Hungary and the Far East, with Uttenweiler becoming the company's main logistics center in Germany in 2011. The company also grew by acquisitions, taking over British electric blanket manufacturer Winterwarm. Winterwarm's Birmingham plant was shut down in 2005 when manufacturing was moved to Hungary.

== History ==
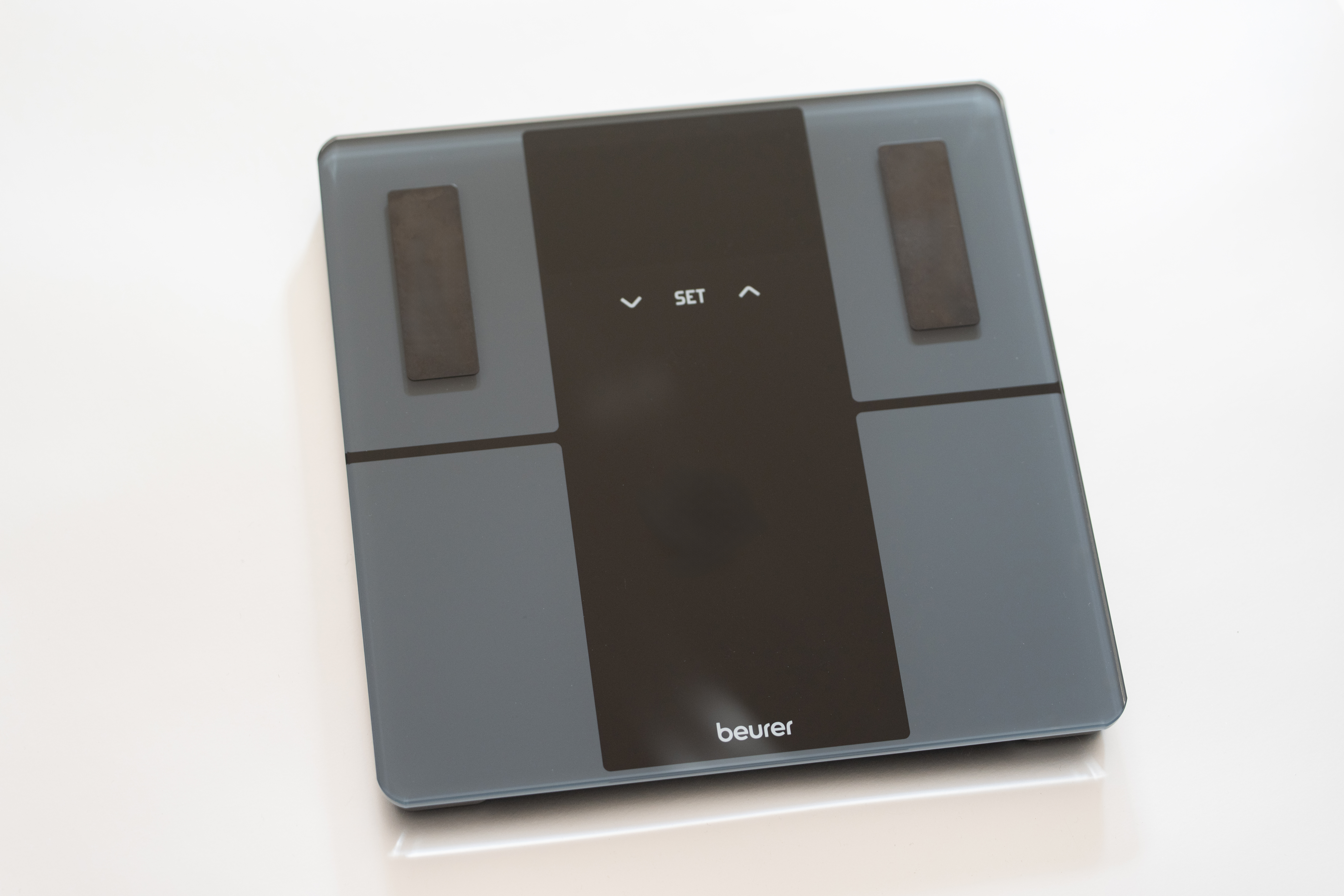
Personal scale: Beurer BF 500

Beurer was founded in 1919 after the first world war in Ulm Germany by Eugen and Käthe Beurer. The company's initial product offering was electric head pads and hairdryers. After World War II, the couple, along with their son Bernhard Beurer, restarted the company, introducing heated underblankets in 1952. The 1980s marked a period of diversification under Managing Director Dieter Bühler, expanding the product range to include health and well-being items.

Due to significant losses in export business, Beurer established a production plant, Beurer Hungaria Kft, in Veszprém, Hungary in 1992. In 1999 Beurer acquired the British company Winterwarm Holding Ltd.

By 2001, the last non-automatable production areas were outsourced to the Beurer Hungaria Kit facility in Hungary. The company introduced a full range of scales in 2002 and launched a 'Beauty and Fitness' product line in 2005. That same year, Beurer closed Winterwarm Holding Ltd. Winterwarm had been a leading supplier of heating pads and blankets in the UK, with a turnover of DM 18 million and a 30% market share.

In 2007, Beurer expanded its product offerings to include blood glucose meters and launched the 'Beurer medical' product division.

In 2008, Beurer underwent a structural change, transitioning from a GmbH & Co. KG to a GmbH. Two years later, in 2010, the company broadened its product portfolio to include a variety of baby products, including baby monitors, baby scales, thermometers, breast pumps, baby food warmers, and steam sterilisers. From 2011, Beurer ventured into the hair care market under the 'Udo Walz by Beurer' brand, offering a range of hair care products.

In 2012, Beurer further expanded its beauty segment to include hair removal products, manicure/pedicure devices, and facial care products. The following year, 2013, marked the introduction of the 'Connect' product range, which features connected health devices in categories like weight, activity, blood pressure, blood sugar, and sleep. These products integrate with the Beurer HealthManager, a comprehensive health monitoring system. Since the launch of this segment, Beurer has expanded its connected product offerings and developed additional apps to enhance user experience and functionality.

In 2016, Beurer introduced the ‘SleepLine’ product line, focused on enhancing sleep quality. This line features a variety of products including a sleep sensor, a snore stopper, humidifier, hygrometer, and an air purifier, all designed to improve sleep environments.

Continuing its expansion into new markets, in 2019, Beurer acquired the fitness startup Antelope, known for its sportswear embedded with electrodes for mobile electrostimulation, aligning with Beurer’s focus on health and wellness technology.

Responding to global health needs arising from the coronavirus pandemic, in 2020, Beurer began manufacturing medical face masks to address demand. That same year, the company also launched ‘Barbers Corner,’ a product line dedicated to men's grooming.

In 2021, Beurer expanded its Hungarian site into a major European production facility for medical products. This facility now produces a range of medical items in addition to Beurer’s traditional heating products, marking a significant enhancement of its manufacturing capabilities in the medical sector. In the same year, Beurer launched its new Health Manager app entitled beurer HealthManager Pro. The app was designed with an accessible user interface to accommodate all users, including those with visual impairments. It allowed for customisation such as adjustable font sizes and contrasts to improve readability. The app provided features for users to review their health data and historical graphs conveniently. Additionally, it included an export function that facilitated the secure sharing of health data with healthcare providers.

In 2022, after nearly three years of construction, Beurer inaugurated its new administrative building, the "Beurer Campus," with an investment of almost 13 million euros at its headquarters in Ulm. The new building added 100 workplaces and was designed to support modern and hybrid working environments. Marco Bühler, Managing Director of Beurer GmbH, stated that the expansion was necessary to accommodate the company’s growth over the past decade. The 2,800 square meter facility features state-of-the-art technology and includes offices, a reception area, a showroom, training and meeting rooms, private focus rooms for online meetings or concentrated work, and a cafeteria-style "Coffice." The design integrated elements of the company's 100-year history, including a history wall and the "Käthe-Beurer-Platz," named after one of the founders, complete with a commemorative statue.

== Group Structure ==
Beurer is represented in over 100 countries and possessing direct and indirect holdings in numerous companies. Within Germany, Beurer holds stakes in nine companies, while internationally, it extends its reach to 27 companies.

=== Subsidiaries ===
One significant subsidiary of Beurer is Hans Dinslage GmbH. Established in 1964 and located in Uttenweiler, which is 64 kilometers from Ulm, the company initially started as an electric blanket factory. Since 1992, it has primarily functioned as a distribution center. Hans Dinslage GmbH is wholly owned by Beurer and holds the SANITAS brand, under which Beurer also markets a range of health products.

- Beurer Produktion Hungaria, since 1992, plant in Veszprém, Hungary
- Beurer Far East Limited, Hong Kong, since 2006
- Beurer Italia, since 2009
- Beurer North America, since 2010
- Beurer UK, since 2011
- Beurer France, since 2011
- Beurer Medical Italia SRL, since 2012
- Beurer Austria, since 2014
- Beurer Hungaria, since 2015
- Medel, acquisition in November 2015
- Beurer Switzerland, since 2019
- Beurer Poland, since 2019
- Beurer India, since 2019
- Beurer Benelux, since 2023
- Beurer Korea, since 2023

== Products ==
Beurer has approximately 1700 employees in its workforce.

Its products are shipped to over 100 countries internationally, including United Arab Emirates, Europe, India, the United Kingdom and Australia, through its global distribution network. Among its competitors are brands such as Medisana, Braun, Philips, Omron, Temu, Amazon, and AliExpress.

The company organises its product range into distinct categories, including health, well-being, beauty, body care, household needs, fitness, and baby care.

Health: This category includes essential medical and health monitoring devices such as blood pressure monitors, inhalers, daylight lamps, infrared lamps, TENS (Transcutaneous Electrical Nerve Stimulation) devices, various types of scales, blood glucose meters, pulse oximeters, clinical thermometers, mobile ECG (Electrocardiogram) devices, hearing aids, emergency products, basal thermometers, pelvic floor training aids, and mouth and nose protectors.

Well-being: Products in this group aim to enhance comfort and relaxation, including heating pads, heated underblankets, electric blankets, foot warmers, massage devices, air purifiers, humidifiers, aroma diffusers, hygrometers, marine air conditioners (maremed®), fans, and light alarm clocks.

Beauty: This segment focuses on personal grooming and includes manicure and pedicure devices, facial care products, hair styling products, hair removal products, and body brushes.

Body Care: Geared towards personal hygiene, this category includes men's care products and dental care items.

Household: Beurer also provides practical household items such as kitchen scales and luggage scales.

Fitness: In the fitness arena, Beurer offers EMS (Electrical Muscle Stimulation) suits (under the Antelope brand), other EMS devices, fascia training devices, Achilles tendon massagers, and fitness trackers.

Baby: Addressing the needs of infants and parents, Beurer manufactures bottle warmers, child-specific inhalers, baby monitors, baby scales, breast pumps, children's clinical thermometers, nasal aspirators, sterilizers, and lice combs.
