= Paper Mill Homburg =

- Papiermühle Homburg
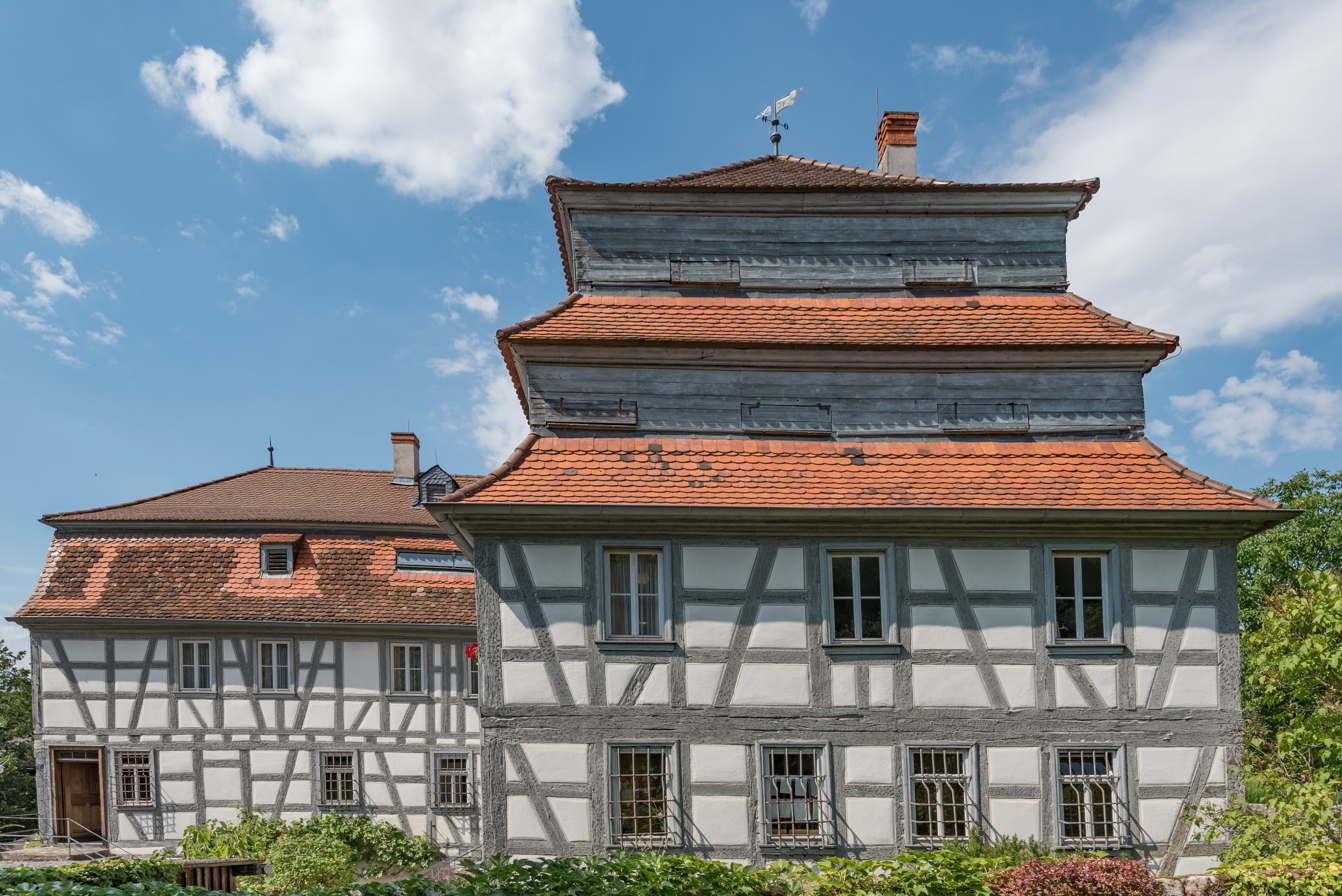
- Main building of Paper Mill Homburg
- Established: 1807
- Dissolved: Production ended 1975
- Location: Gartenstraße 11, 97855 Triefenstein-Homburg am Main
- Coordinates: 49.793823°N 9.626223°E
- Parking: Remlingerstraße 12, 97855 Triefenstein-Homburg am Main 49.794667°N 9.626194°E
- Website: www.papiermuehle-homburg.de

The Paper Mill Homburg, built in 1807, is located in Triefenstein-Homburg am Main. It was used until 1975 for the commercial production of paper and cardboard and was renovated 1994 to 1997 as a paper mill museum. The production facilities with original machines and equipment are preserved.

== History ==
=== The beginnings (manual paper production) ===
In 1806, the paper miller Leonhard Leinziger decided to give up his operation in nearby Windheim due to the temporary shortage of water in the Hafenlohr River, dismantle the local mill and relocate to Homburg. In November 1806 he received from them permission to found the paper mill in Homburg. The Bischbach was ideally suited for the mill operation, because its source is not far from the mill and delivered sufficient amounts of clean spring water in all months of the year, as it did not freeze in winter. The water served both to drive the water wheel and as process water. At the same time, the Grand Duchy of Würzburg offered a sufficiently large sales market.

"The consumption of paper has risen high in the ravings of every kind, even in the province, and there is no lack of common material of rags. Therefore there are 10 paper mills with 50 workers and a product of 22377 fl. of which for 2463fl. go abroad again."

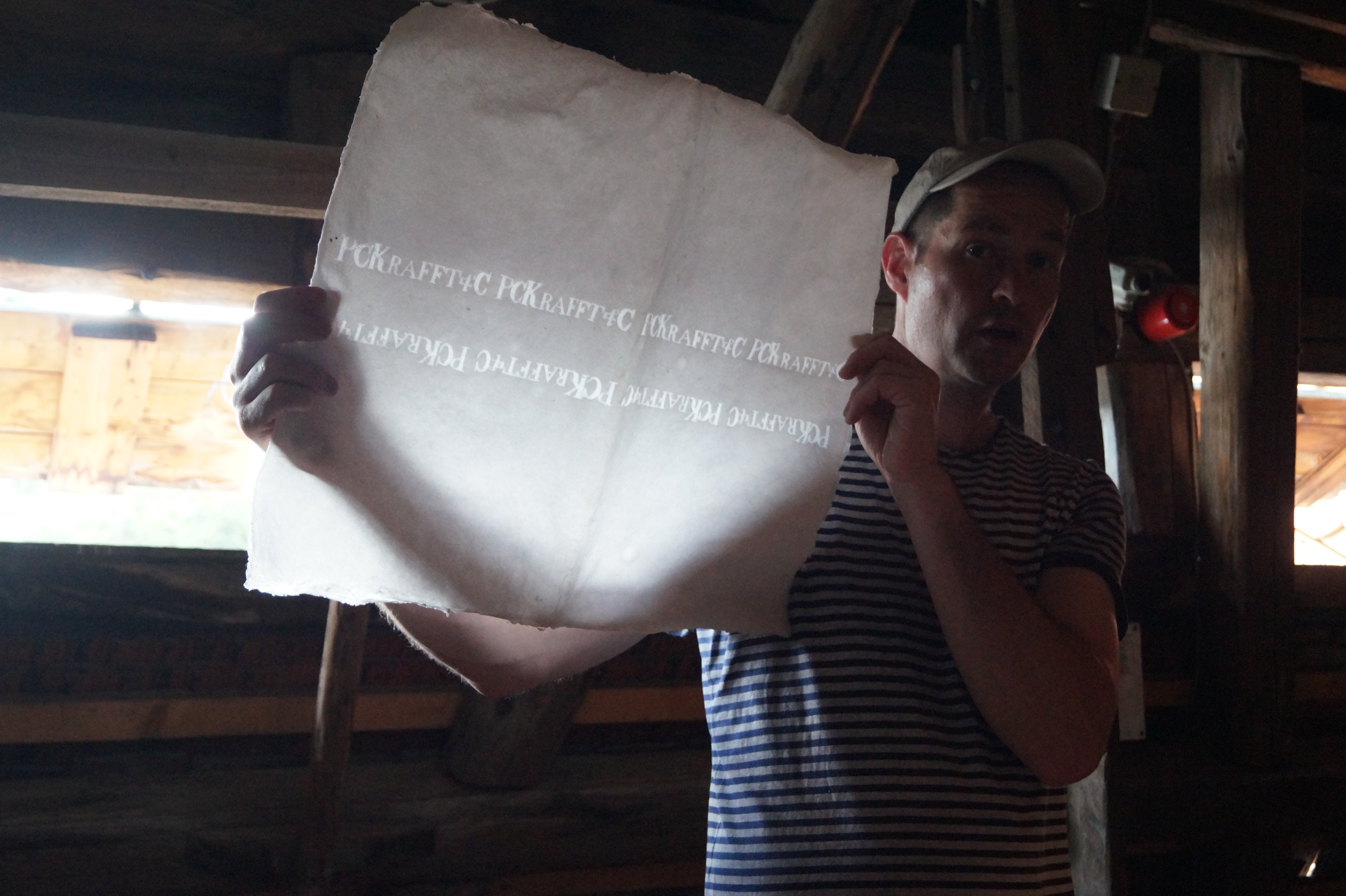
Handmade paper with a watermark

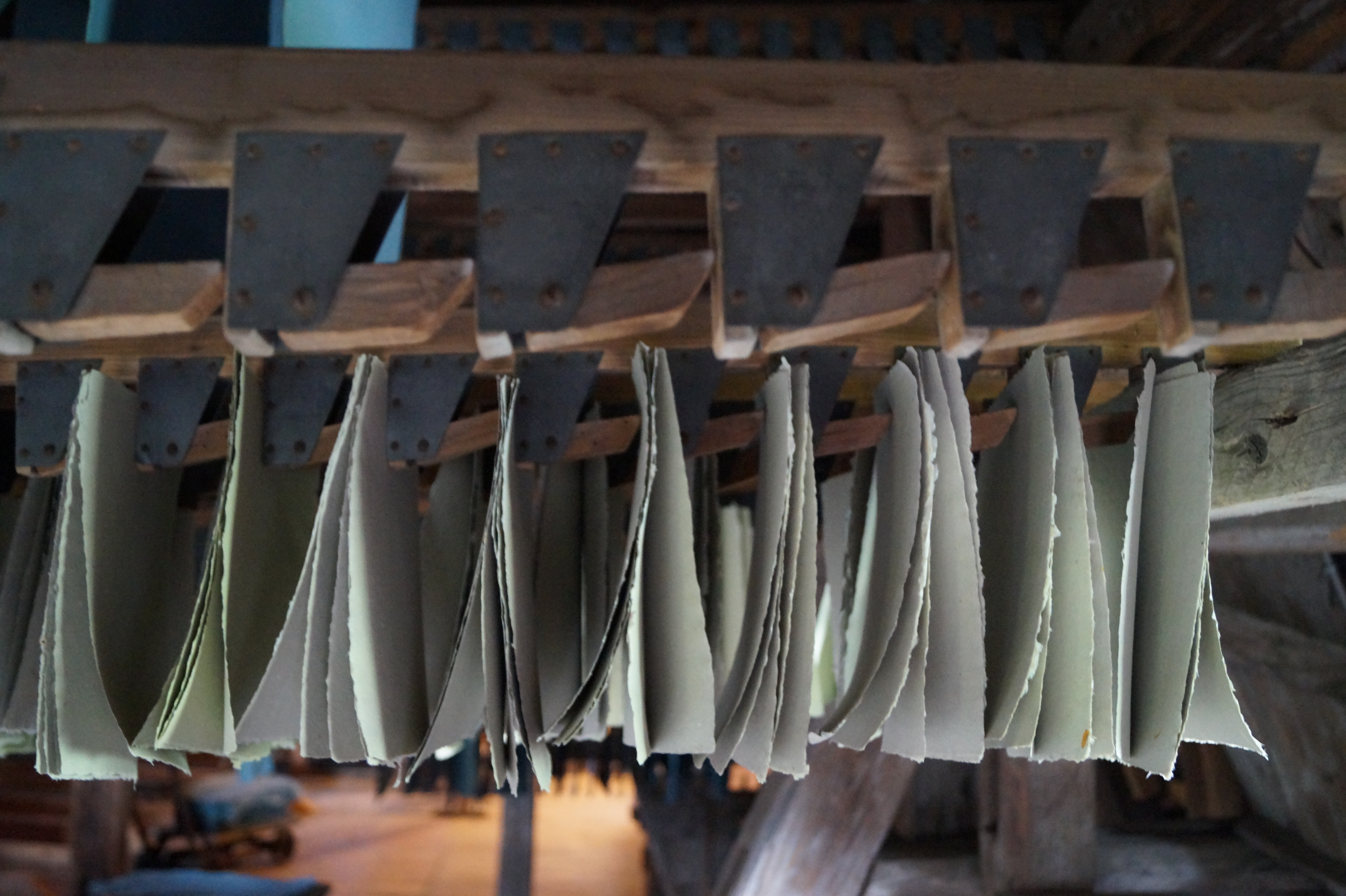
Paper drying in the attic

Until the middle of the 19th century, rags and clothes from linen, hemp or cotton were used as pulp material for making paper, which were collected by rag pickers and sorted, washed and shredded in the paper mill. In order to ensure the supply of the coveted raw material, rags export prohibitions were issued. On the other hand, the processing of unsanitary textile waste posed a threat to mill workers suffering from infectious diseases such as anthrax, typhus or cholera. In particular, the health of women engaged in rag sorting was at risk. Therefore, infected textiles should be incinerated in accordance with a sanitary regulation, although this was associated with a reduction in the supply of raw materials.

"The export of the rags is prohibited by law. One should, therefore, think that there is enough material inland, without the necessity of bringing in from abroad. However, many rags are used as fertilizers and are therefore removed from the paper mills; Also, under more stringent supervision of the health police, many old burlap cloths and clothing are being burned to lessen the contagion that was brought to the paper mills. For the same reason but should also be kept on the introduction of rags from abroad the strictest supervision."

The papers produced were still handmade at the time. In 1823, Leinzigers son Conrad set up a sales office in Würzburg and offered "all sorts" of Homburger "paper products for extremely cheap prices in best quality bale, crack and book way for sale". A commercial note book ("Calculationsbuch") of Johann Follmer, the subsequent owner of the paper mill, is preserved, which dates from 1853 "Calculationsbuch" and provides information about the paper qualities produced. It lists writing and printing papers of various qualities, packaging papers and also tobacco paper.

=== Building, mill race and mill wheel ===
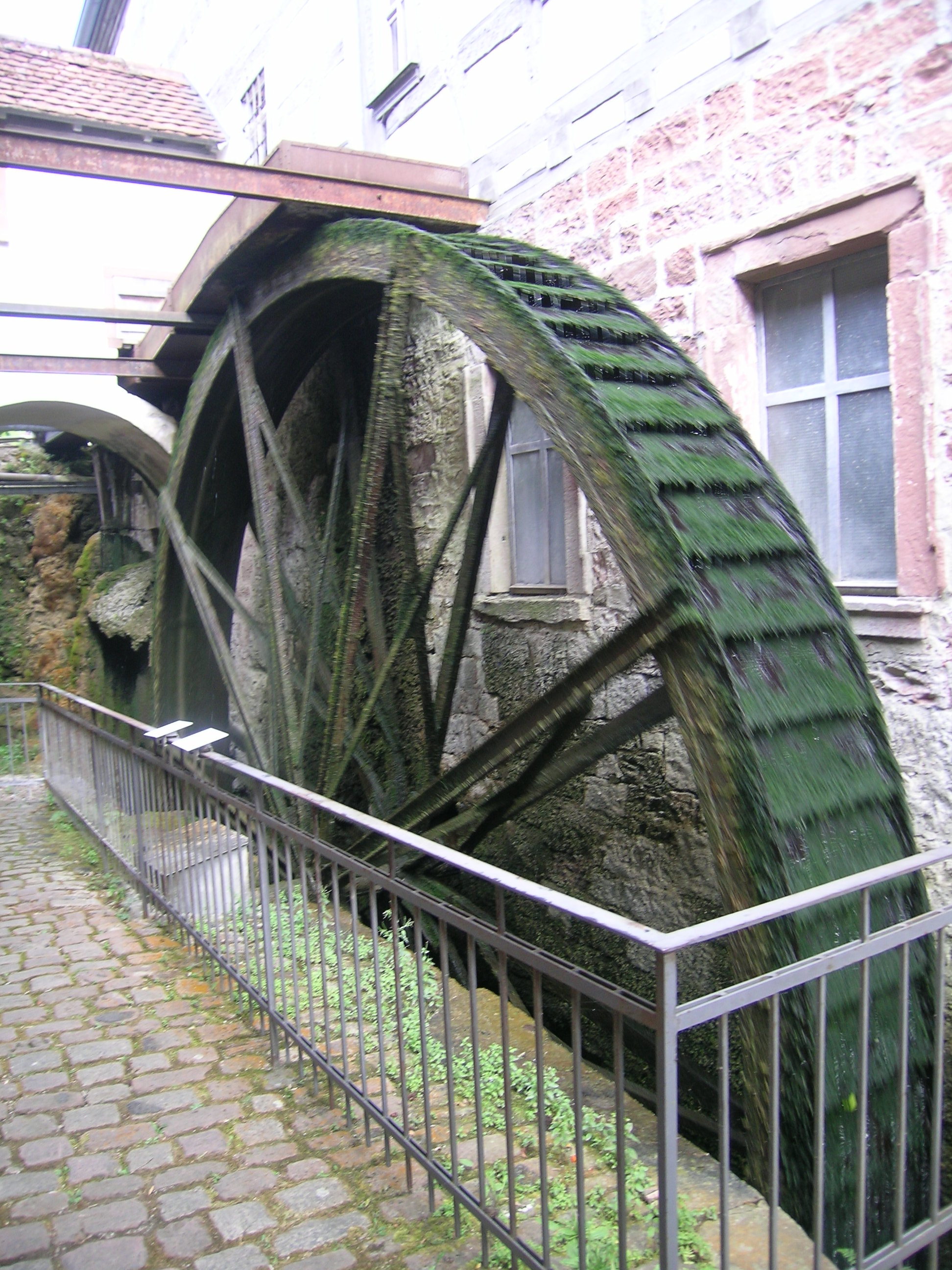
Mill wheel, 2018

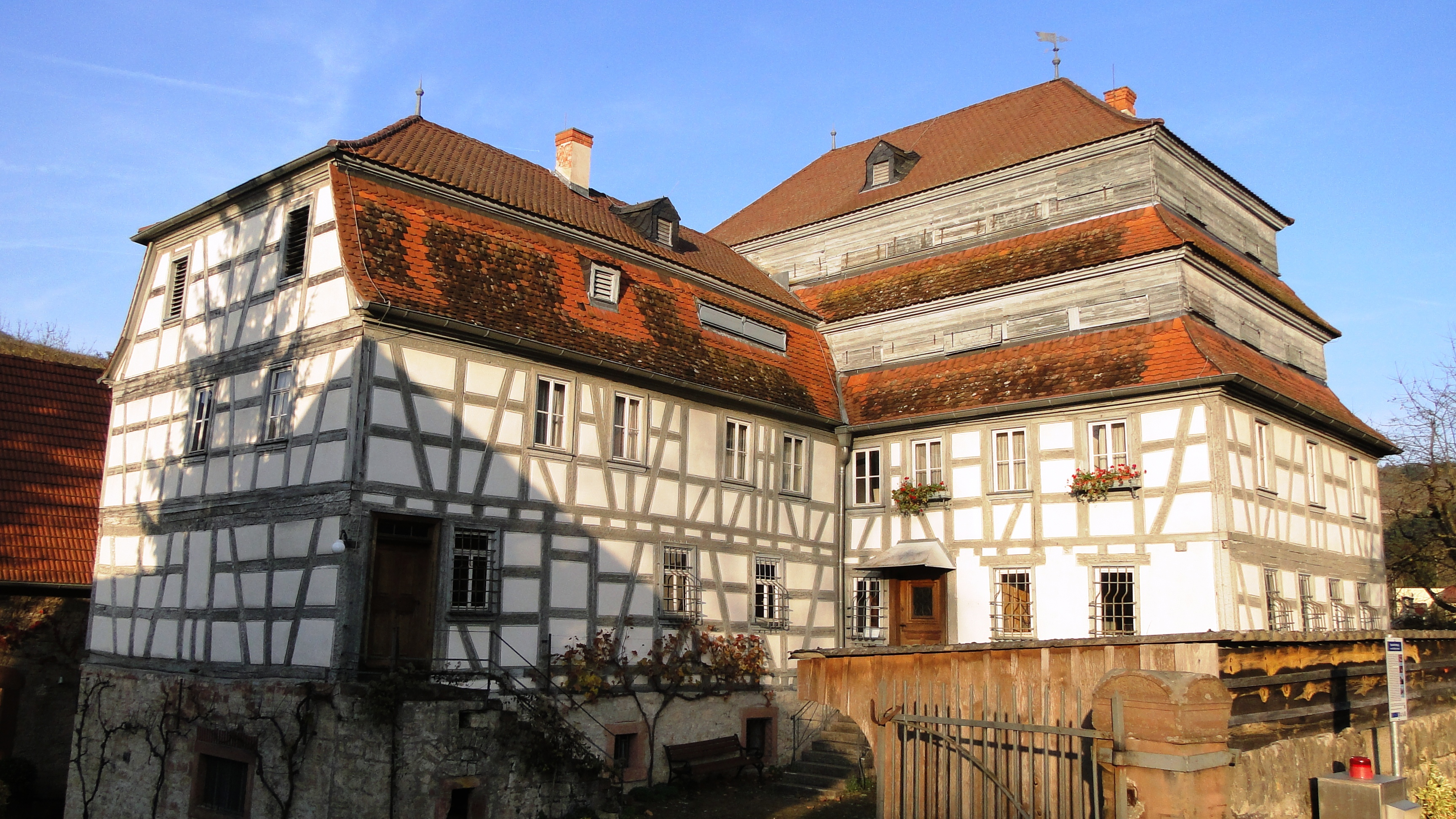
Paper Mill Homburg, 2018

The building of the paper mill, which dates back to 1807, was built as a two-storey two-winged building in half-timbered construction above a high basement floor. It contains also the entrance to the museum. The main building is equipped with a three-level hipped roof, whereby the windows to the two dry floors are located between the individual roof steps. The side wing is equipped with a pagoda roof. The age of the woodwork used for the truss using was assessed by the radiocarbon method and shows that it originated from an older mill.

The outbuilding from the 19th century, a two-storey quarry stone construction with sandstone framing and pitched roof serves today as a venue for celebrations. In addition, there are changing exhibitions. Upstairs, a covered passageway leads to the main building.

The upper mill-ditch fed by the spring dates from the beginning of the 19th century. It ends directly above the mill wheel in a channel, in which the flow direction of the water is diverted. The effluent at the bottom water thus drives the overshot mill wheel, which is made from iron. This has the advantage that forms less spray water on the path located in front of the waterwheel.

The waterwheel originally served to drive the pug mill stones to break up the fibers. The mill trench also provided the paper mill with clean process water for washing the rags and dispersing the pulp. Later, the hydropower also powered papermaking machinery. Today, the waterwheel is mainly used for regenerative energy generation. An electric generator generates 4.5 kilowatts of electricity and feeds it into the public grid. At museum demonstrations, it continues to drive the system.

=== Machinised card board production ===
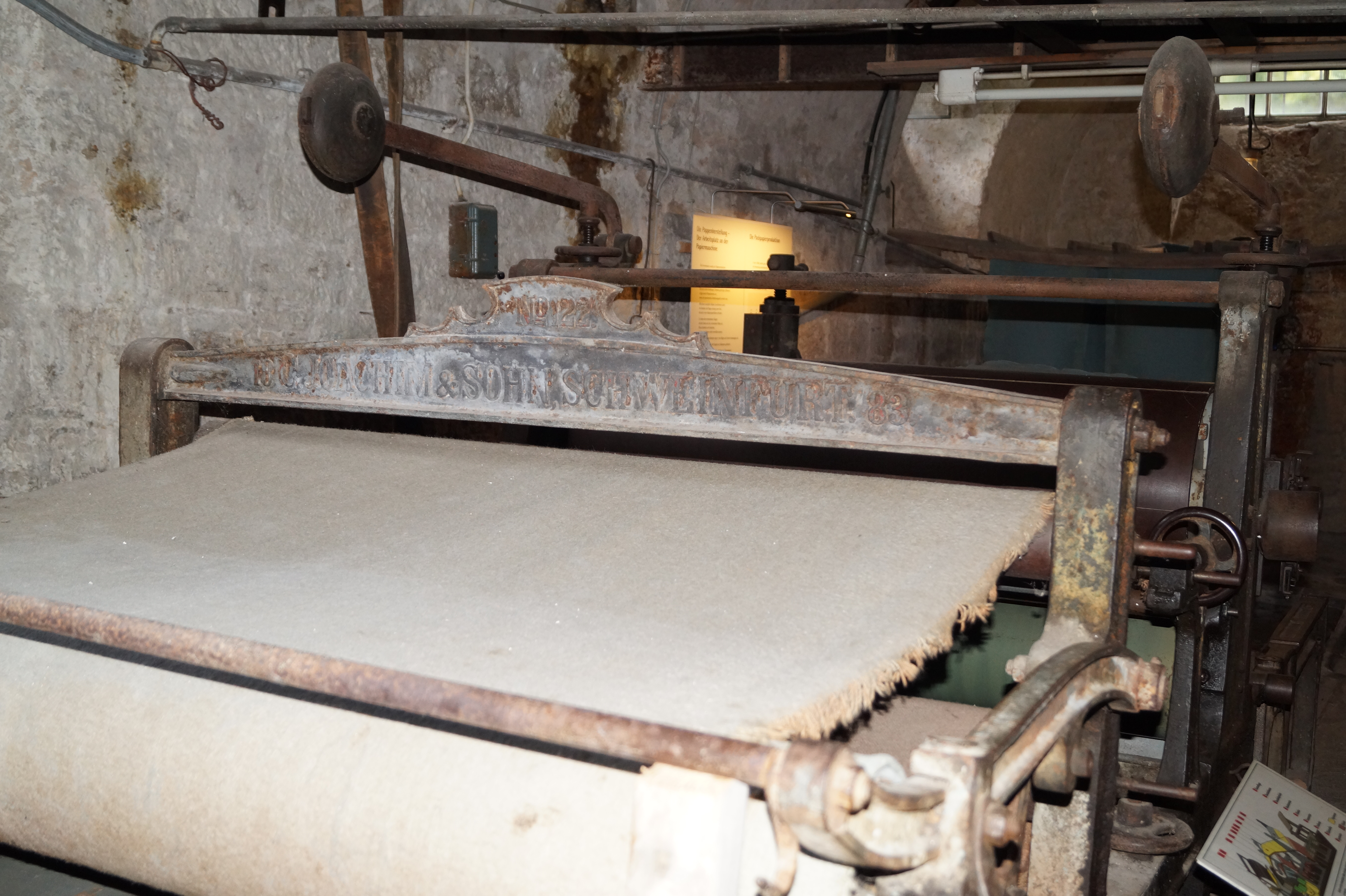
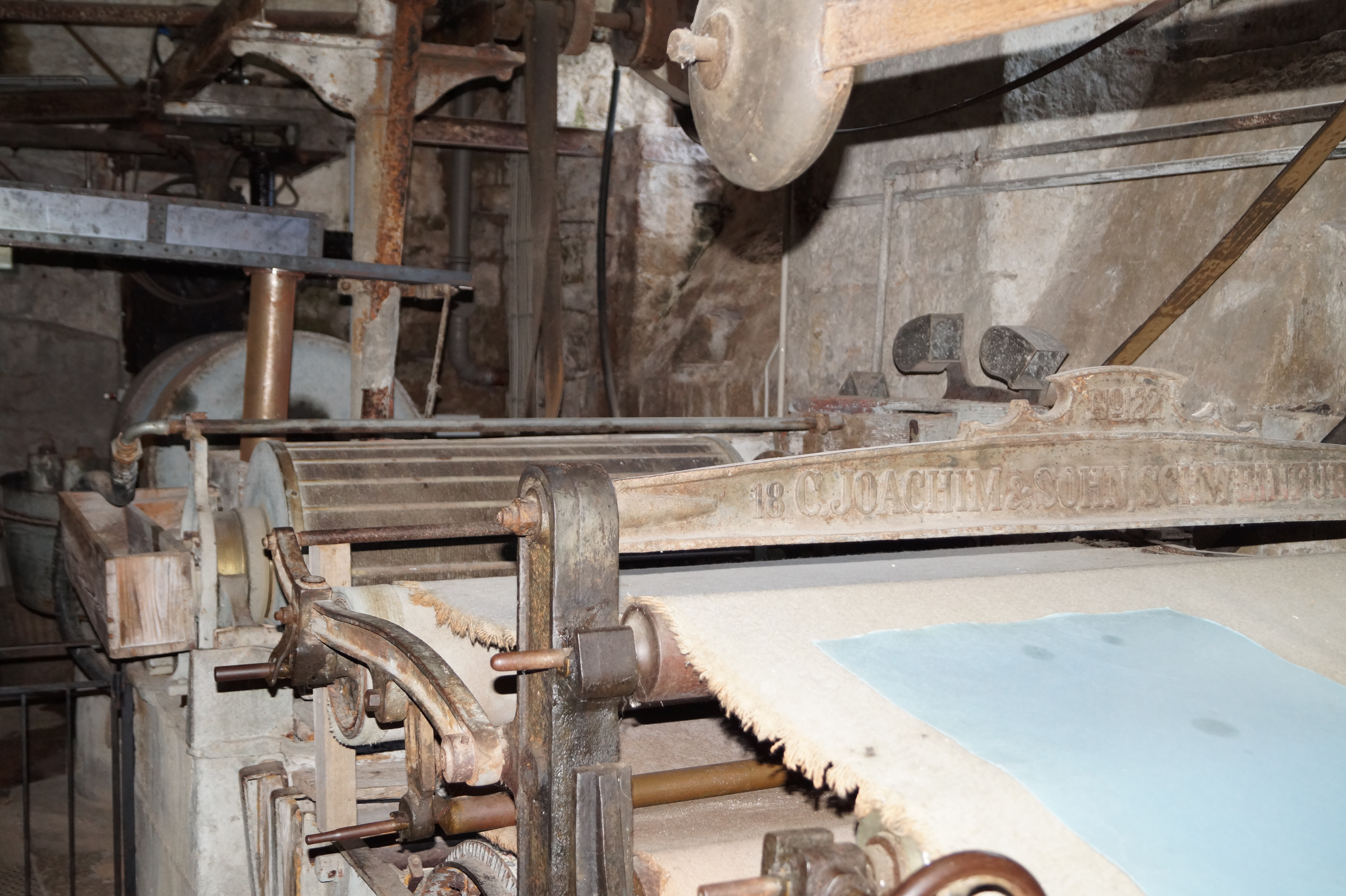
Cylinder cardboard machine of Joachim & Sohn, Schweinfurt

Advertisement C. Joachim & Sohn, Maschinenfabrik, Schweinfurt 1888

With the increasing consumption of paper, wood pulp and cellulose broadened the raw material base and with the invention of the paper machine and the associated large paper mills, stiff competition affected the smaller paper mills. Follmer's mill had sufficient capital through the associated farm to secure the existence of the mill by investing in a simple round screening machine and specializing in paperboard production. Thanks to its compact design, the machine could be set up without any structural expansion of the production facility. The machine was built in 1883 Joachim & Sohn machine works in Schweinfurt. The prices of such a machine depended on the type of machine and was according to the Schweinfurt price list of 1900 in the range 1875 and 2600 marks for a rotary screen machine. So it was a substantial investment, compared to the previous value of Follmer's possessions, which were listed as 30,000 marks in 1887.

The finished paper sheets were placed in the attic to dry over clothesline or hung-up with special pegs. This work was mostly done by children. Special ventilation flaps ensured adequate air exchange.

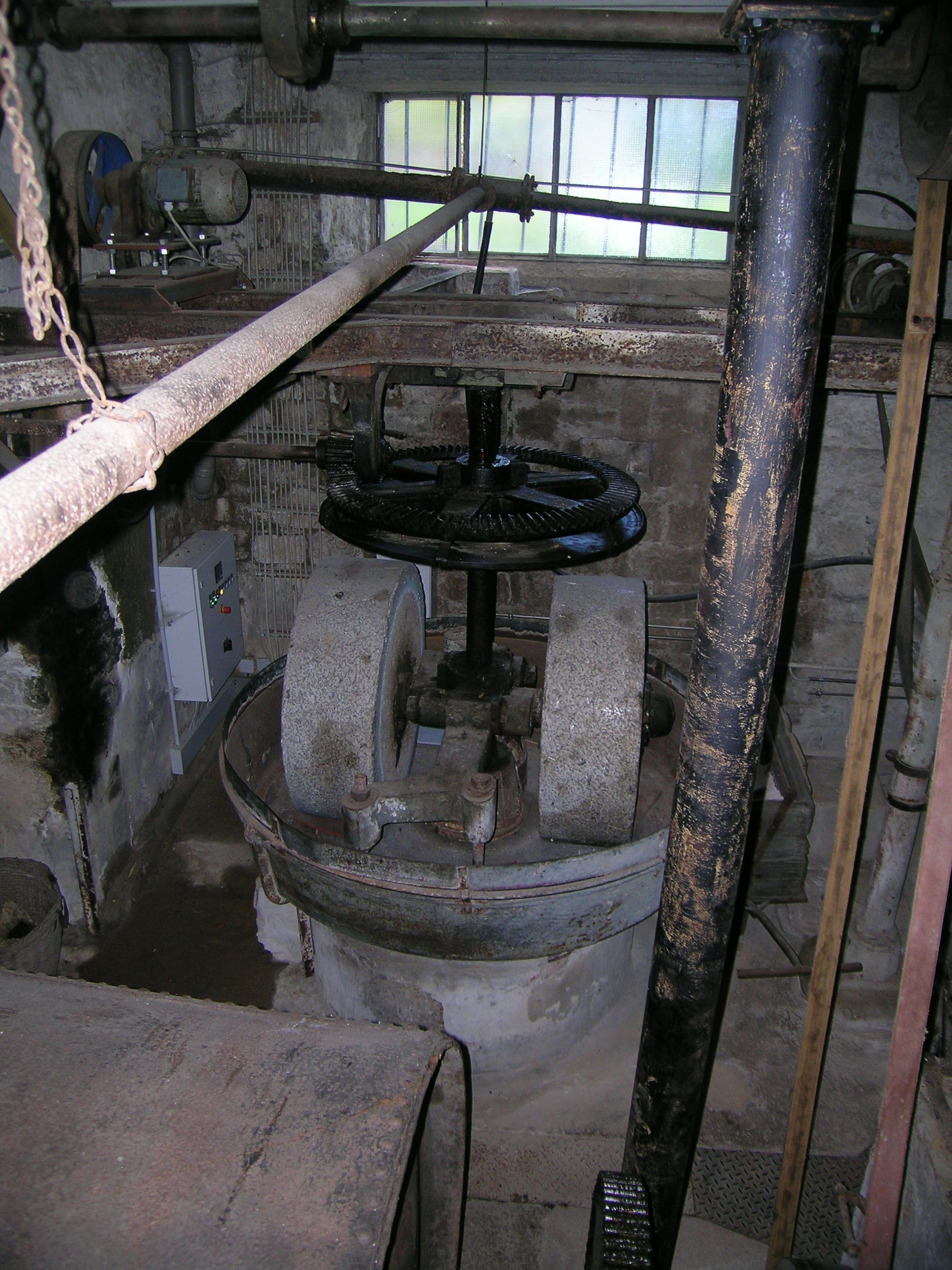
Pug mill

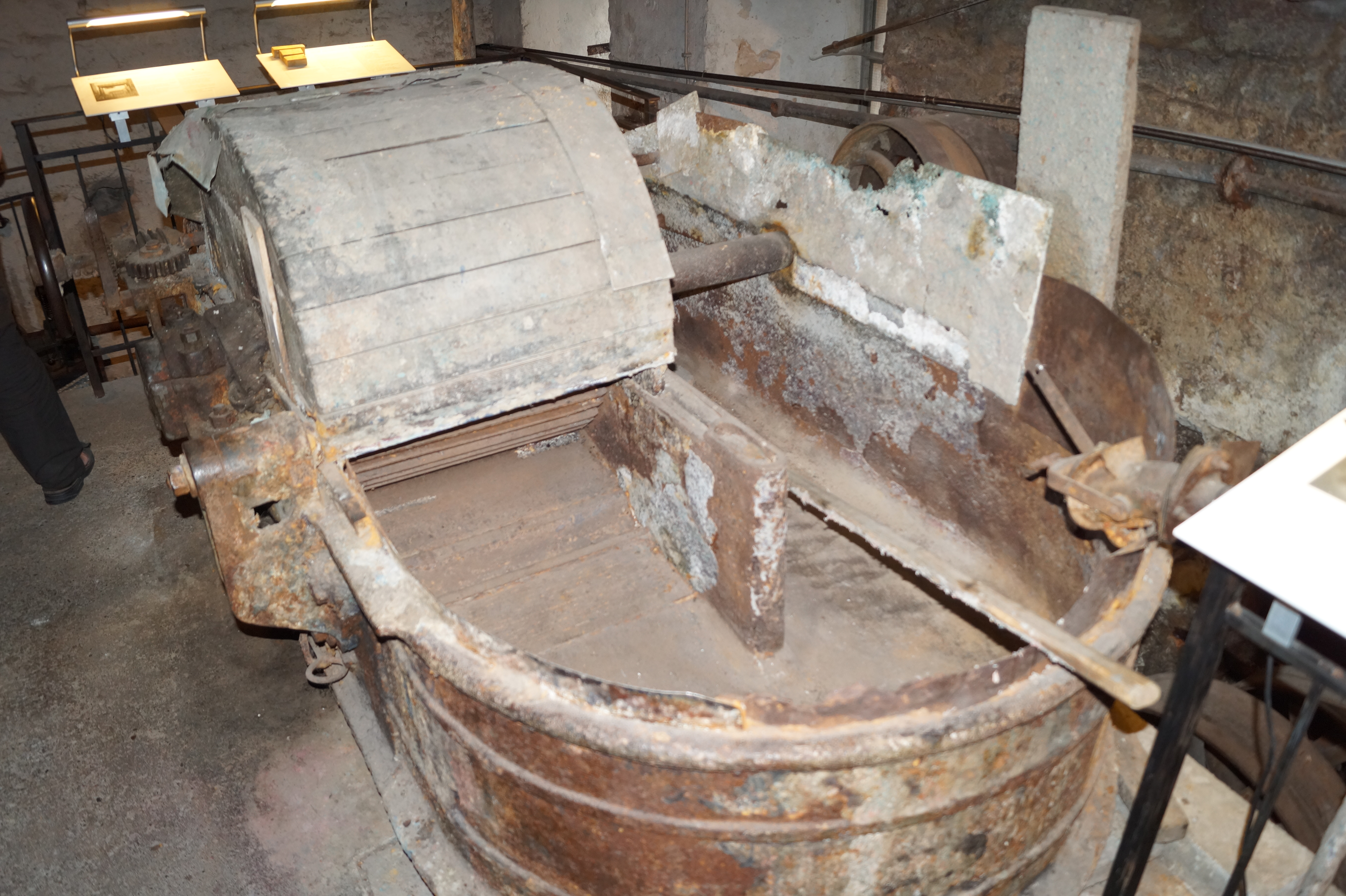
Hollander beater

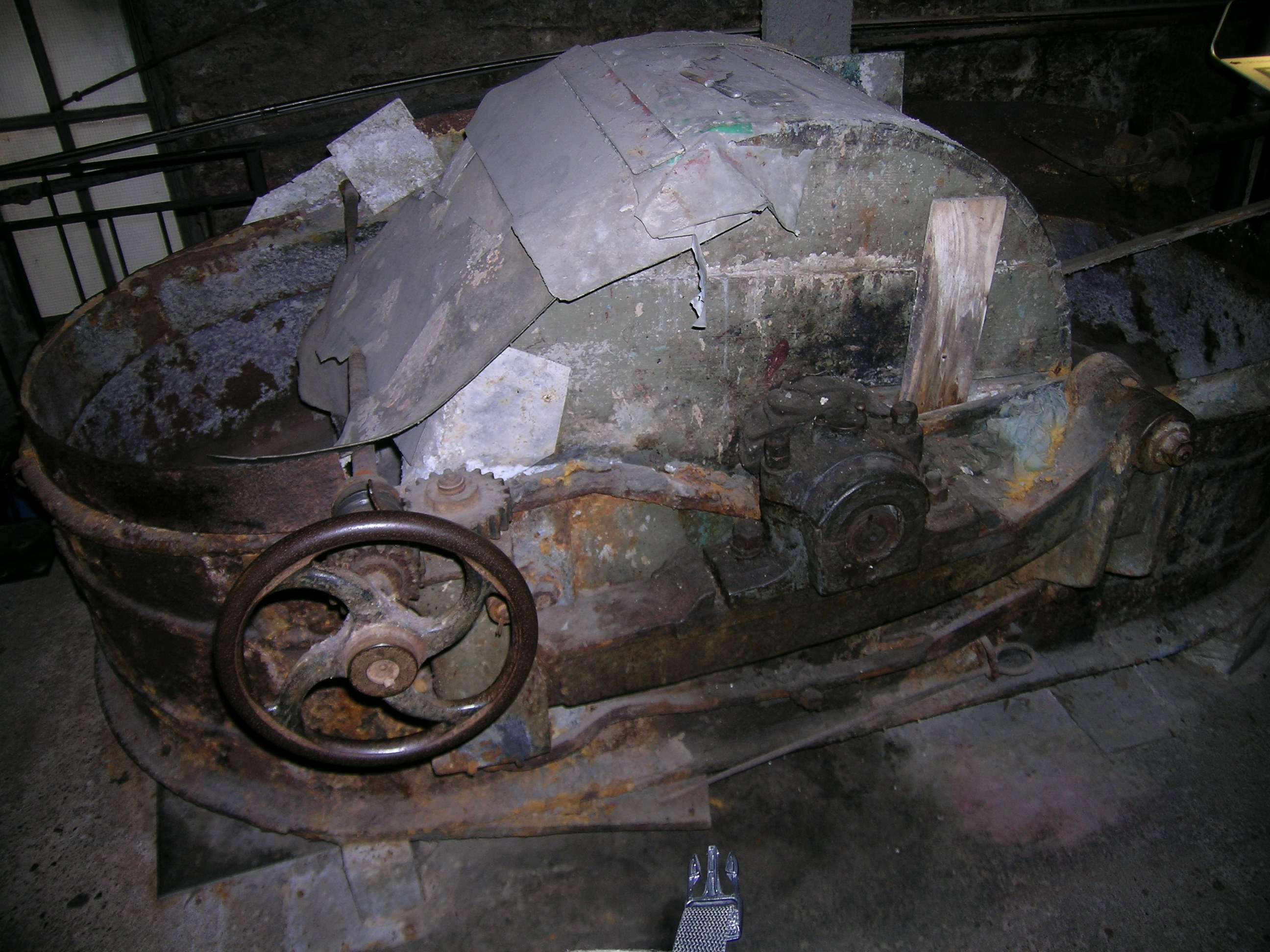
Hollander beater

The mill specialized in folder and packaging paper production prior to World War II. The Homburg assortment consisted in 1955 of colored, embossed cardboard, colored folders and ribbed folders. In the latter case, a special round cylinder mimicked the ribs in the cardboard caused by the scoop during the hand-made bows. While mechanical file-to-blanket production ran until it was shut down in 1975, packaging paper production was discontinued soon after 1955.

The paper drying was done in the attics from the founding of the paper mill until 1975. There, the entire dry floor facility is preserved with paper clips, dry bars and hemp rope covering. To be able to work independently of the capacity of the dry floors and the weather, Johann Hermann, the son of Johann Follmer, built a heated, separate drying hall in 1913. Today, only plans give the structural shape of that building, since the hall was demolished after production ceased.

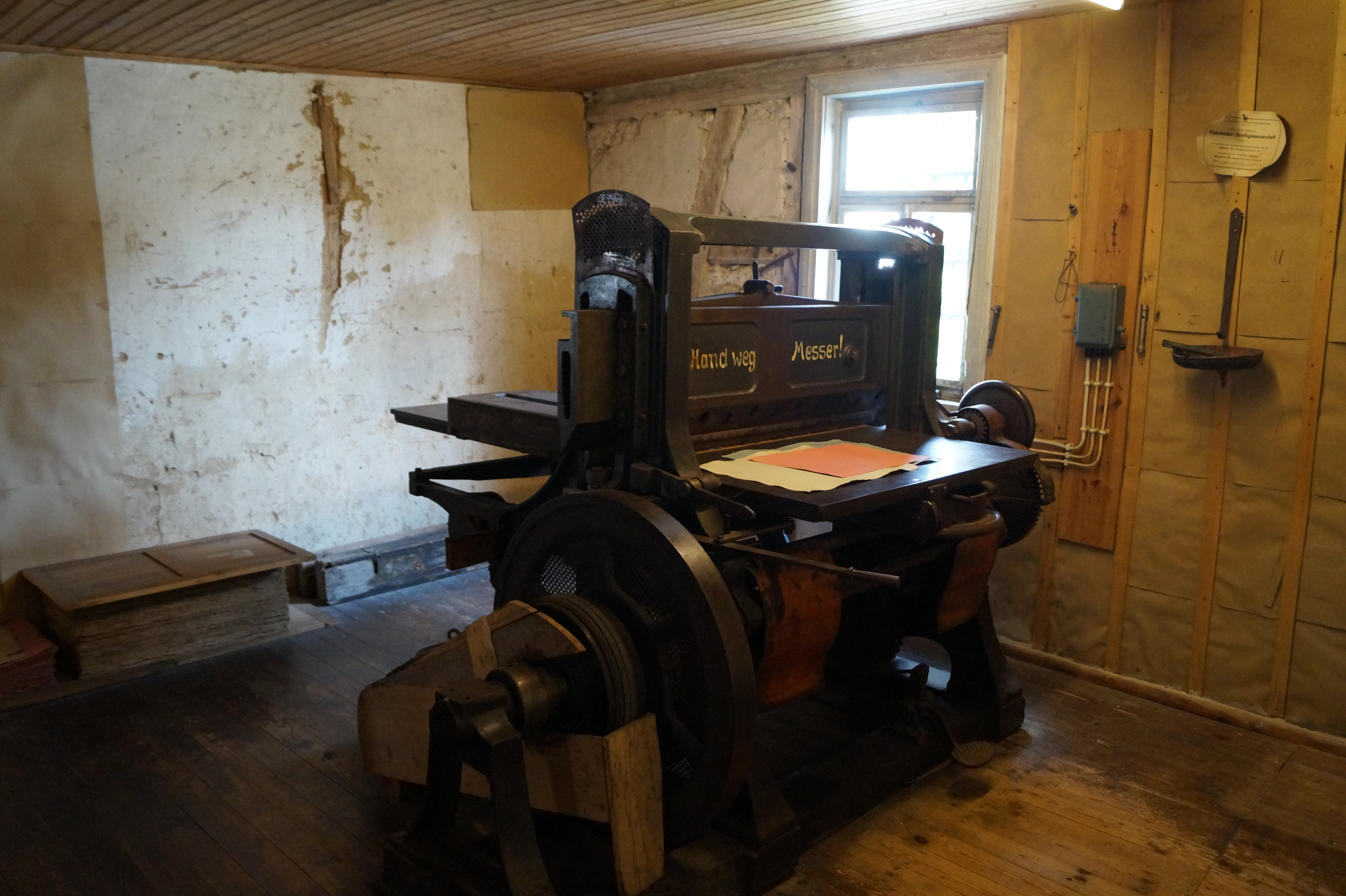
Format cutting machine

The folders were smoothed in a colander equipped with two cylindrical rollers. Satin-finished folders were pressed until 1975 in a wooden screw press, which was equipped with two pressing devices and had already belonged to the pre-industrial workshop equipment. For the trimming of the folder a format cutting machine from the 1930s was used, which was acquired in the 1950s.

Homburg folders and card board were sold both in Germany and abroad. Domestic customers of the paper mill complemented paper wholesalers, for instance, the State Archives Würzburg, folder manufacturers or the printing department of the penal institution in Straubing. In 1956, a Hamburg paper exporter expressly requested the delivery of the "extra toughened air-dried handmade blanket cover" in "seaworthy full board packaging". These were made in a small workshop in the mill building and exported as Homburg envelope in 1956 to Venezuela. The "Skandinaviska Etuifarbiken" in Malmö in 1960 requested an offer for ten tons of envelope and file board. It was recognised and appreciated that the quality of the cardboard produced on the rotary screen machine was high, because it was not glued, but "particularly tough and well glued".

Although manual paper production was never completely discontinued, the mill increasingly specialized in folder and packaging paper production. Wrapping paper production was discontinued in 1955, while machine-file production ran until plant shutdown. After 186 years, the Homburger paper mill ceased operations in 1975. The two main reasons for the shutdown were the comparatively labor-intensive mode of production and higher sanitation requirements, so a new treatment plant would have been needed, with no space and no resources available.

== Museum ==
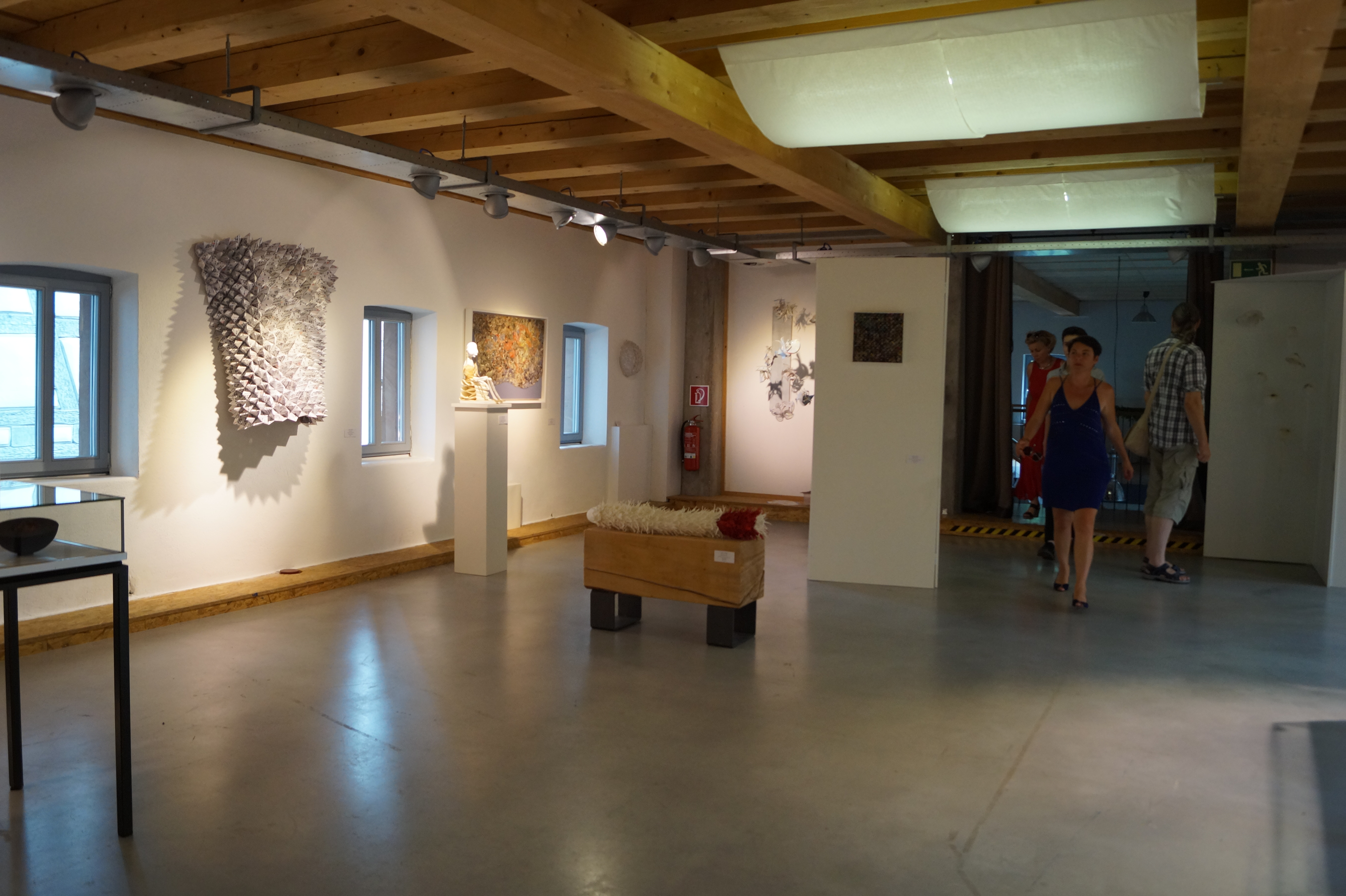
Paper museum, 2018

After decommissioning in 1975, the building was listed as a historical monument (File No. D-6-77-154-6), but its renovation began only 20 years later. In the meantime, the Follmer family continued to take care of the preservation of the building. Great emphasis was placed on original fidelity. The original equipment of pre-industrial production such as water wheel, dry floor and wooden screw press are preserved, as well as the functional papermaking machines. After three years of renovation, the paper mill was opened in 1997 as a historical and technical museum . In addition to the old production facilities, it shows the working and living situation at the time of the shutdown of the factory.

The entire manufacturing process at the time of plant shutdown can still be understood based on the historical machinery and equipment preserved. There are both pre-industrial facilities such as waterwheel drive, dry floors and a wooden screw press, as well as industrial machinery. In the authentically preserved production rooms, the production process, working life and workplace situation in the paper mill are vividly informed. Furthermore, the museum presentation includes the environment of the people who worked and lived in the mill. The living rooms are kept in their original state during the shutdown. Documentation exhibitions on the different paper raw materials, watermarks and preindustrial hand-paper production complete the exhibition.

== Today's manual paper production ==
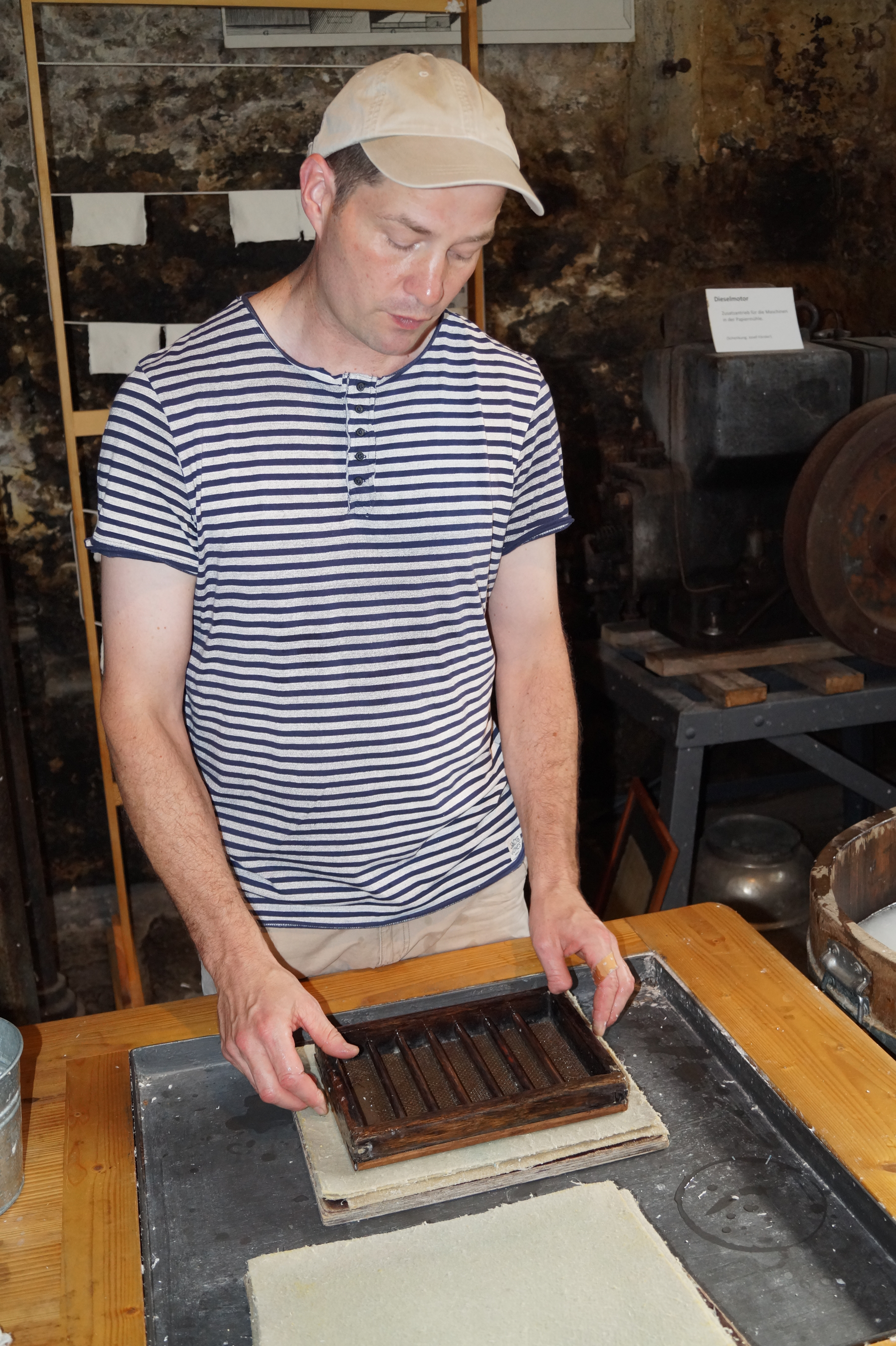
Johannes Follmer

The papermaker Johannes Follmer, the youngest member of the family, continues the papermaking tradition that has existed in Homburg for almost two centuries in the fifth generation in the 21st century. The decision to work with paper evolved from the long-standing family tradition, which should receive new validity through the further development of the products and production methods. He has acquired the necessary know-how from various teachers. This included, among other things, the stay of several weeks in the Büttenpapierfabrik Gmund and a basic study in the papermaking school Gernsbach near Baden-Baden.

In the outbuilding of the museum he runs a modern papermaking workshop. There, the classical papermaking industry is experiencing a renaissance: Each sheet of handmade paper is drawn by hand and dried in air as it was then. The paper differs from the machine-made papers in its finely grained surface and four-sided deckle edge. The basis for paper production in his workshop are historical and modern scoops, various presses and a paper Dutchman for processing the fibers. Depending on the desired paper quality, today high quality raw materials are used. In addition to fabric scraps, various fibers are used: cotton, flax, hemp or abaca. Pigments, mottling and inclusions in handmade paper complete the range of different paper types. In addition, papers are produced for high-quality printmaking. In collaboration with various artists, large bows with elaborate watermarks are created by hand.

Bringing handmade paper closer to a wider audience in its original environment is a goal pursued by the Homburg papermaker. Paper should regain importance as an independent medium. The Homburg paper making tradition strives also in the computer age, to persist and defy by craftsmanship the new Zeitgeist.
