= Triefenstein =

- Municipality
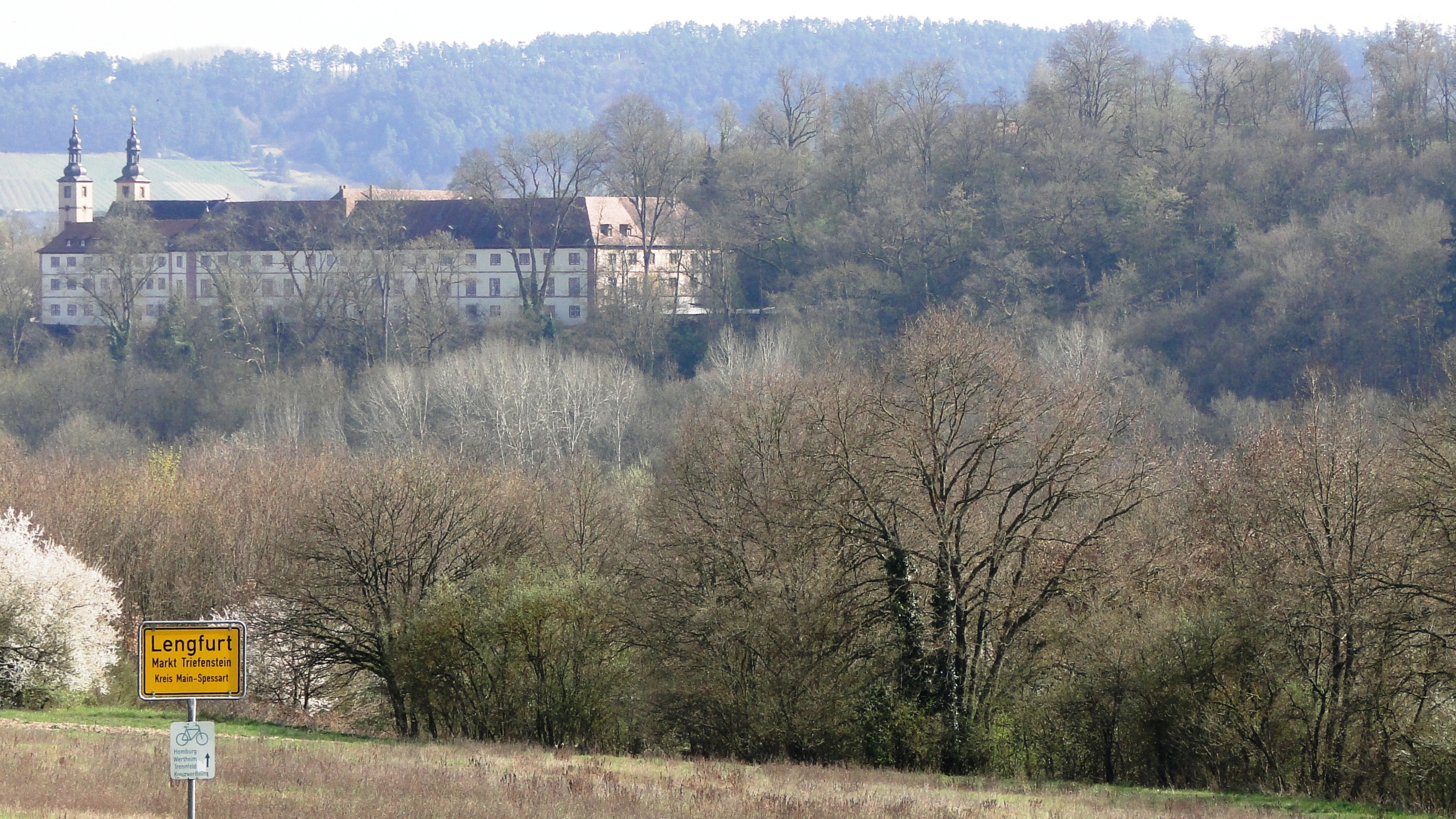
- Kloster Triefenstein seen from Lengfurt

- Coat of arms

- Location of Triefenstein within Main-Spessart district
- Interactive map of Triefenstein
- Location within Germany Location within Bavaria
- Coordinates: 49°48′N 9°36′E
- Country: Germany
- State: Bavaria
- Admin. region: Unterfranken
- District: Main-Spessart

Government
  - Mayor (2020–26): Kerstin Deckenbrock

Area
  - Total: 25.47 km^{2} (9.83 sq mi)
- Elevation: 140–296 m (459–971 ft)

Population (2025-12-31)
  - Total: 4,170
  - Density: 164/km^{2} (424/sq mi)
- Time zone: UTC+01:00 (CET)
  - Summer (DST): UTC+02:00 (CEST)
- Postal codes: 97855
- Dialling codes: 09395
- Vehicle registration: MSP
- Website: www.markt-triefenstein.de

Markt Triefenstein (German pronunciation: [ˈtʁiːfn̩ˌʃtaɪn]) is a market municipality in the Main-Spessart district in the Regierungsbezirk of Lower Franconia (Unterfranken) in Bavaria, Germany. It was created in 1978 out of the villages Homburg am Main, Lengfurt, Rettersheim and Trennfeld.

== Geography ==
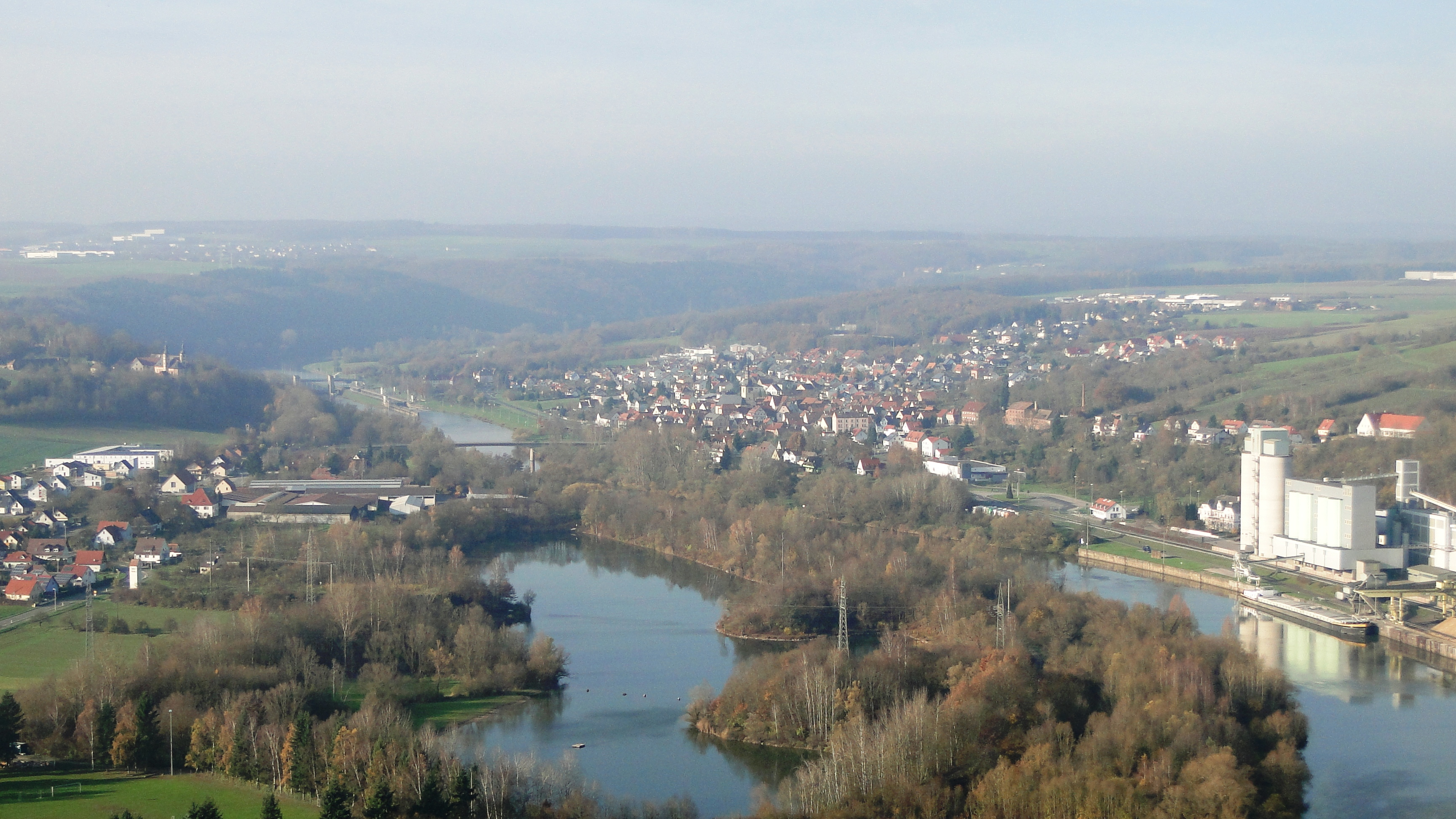
View of Triefenstein from Kallmuth: Trennfeld, Kloster Triefenstein, Klostersee (quarry pond), Main (river) with lock, Lengfurt, cement works (left to right).

=== Location ===
Markt Triefenstein is part of the Main-Spessart district of Bavaria. It is located on the river Main between Marktheidenfeld and Wertheim am Main. To the south it borders on Baden-Württemberg.

The community has the following Gemarkungen (traditional rural cadastral areas): Homburg am Main, Lengfurt, Rettersheim and Trennfeld. The former two are located on the left bank of the Main, the latter two on the right bank.

=== Geology ===
The hills in the east of the community's territory are made up of Muschelkalk on top of the normal Buntsandstein or red sandstone of the Spessart hills. This terroir makes the area around Homburg well-suited for growing wine. In addition, the vineyards profit from the protective bowl-shape of the hill (Kallmuth, 278 metres above sea level) and the heat-store of the river Main. Since 1981, the vineyards on Kallmuth have been a protected monument. The Bocksberg, west of the Main, is the westernmost muschelkalk occurrence in Bavaria.

Homburg castle sits on a rock made up of tufa.

== History ==
=== Prehistory and Middle-Ages ===
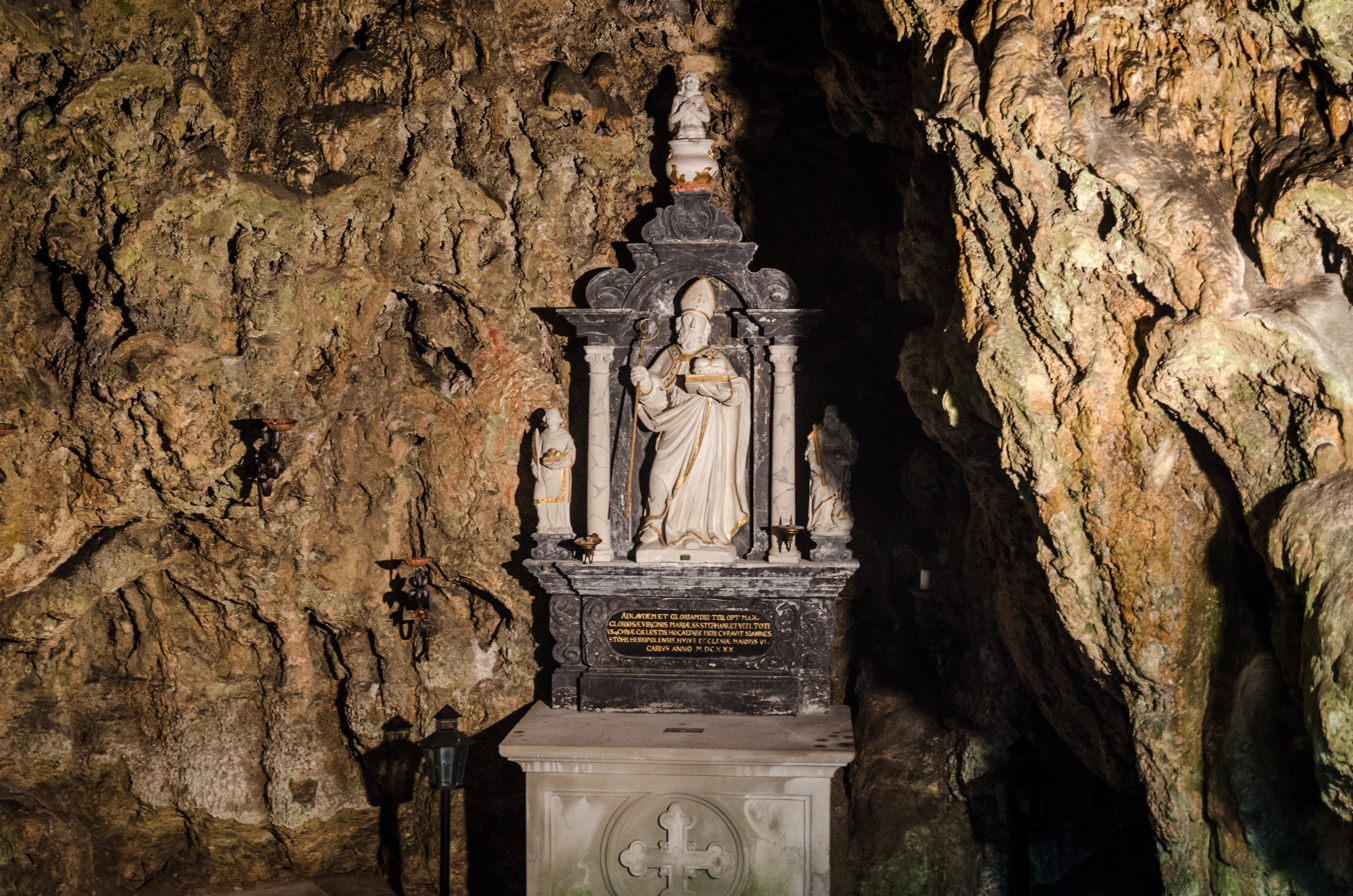
Altar in the Burkhardusgrotte.

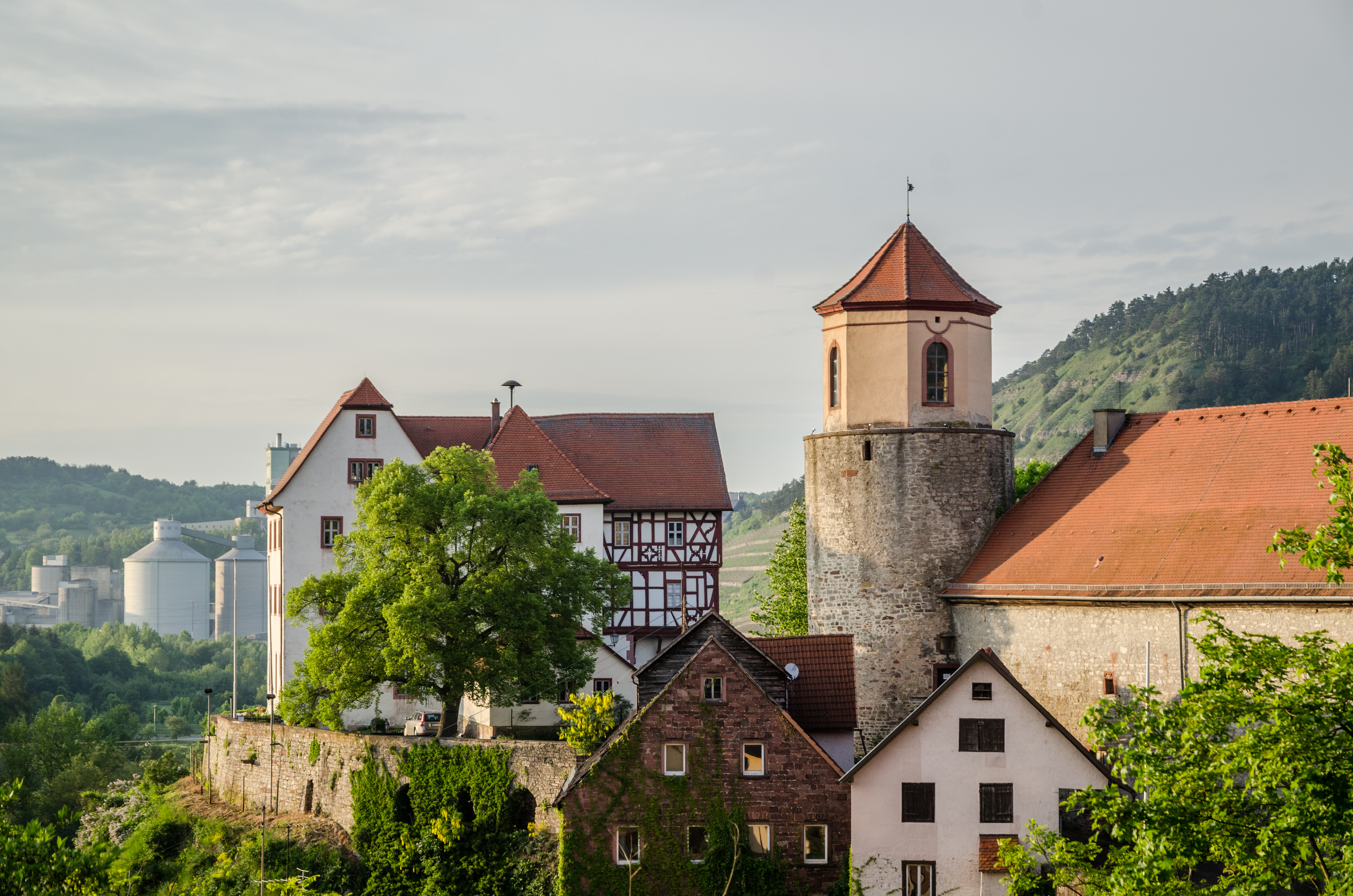
Schloss Homburg.

A burial site near Trennfeld is attributed to the urnfield culture (1200 to 750 BC) and nearby there is a group of 15 burial mounds from the Iron Age (700 to 450 BC).

Archeological evidence points to Iron Age fortifications on a rocky outcropping on the right bank of the Main, north of where the monastery stands today. Later this was the site of early medieval fortifications and then of the Neuenburg castle (12th or 13th century), associated with the Ravensburg family and which was likely destroyed in a fire. The site was strategically important, controlling the Via Publica, dating back to Roman times, and its Main crossing at Lengfurt.

According to tradition, Saint Burchard, Bishop of Würzburg (741-754) lived as a hermit (or, alternatively, concealed himself from enemies whilst travelling) in a natural cave at the foot of the hill on which Homburg castle is now located. He allegedly died and was buried there.

In the first half of the 8th century, a fortification known as Hohenburg was built by the Frankish kings at Homburg. In the late 10th century, it fell to the Bishop of Würzburg who gave it as a fief to the Counts of Wertheim.

A list of territories gained by Fulda Abbey between 755 and 885 (Fuldaer Tradition) names "Lengesfurt" given by a "Count Egino". This is considered too vague to be the first written mention of the Triefenstein area, however, which is instead thought to be the Codex Eberhardi, issued by Louis the Pious in 839. It mentions the Via Publica, which crossed the Main at Lengfurt, and a gorge (Klingenbachschlucht).

The first written mention of Lengfurt itself occurred at the foundation of Kloster Triefenstein (Triefenstein Monastery). It was founded by the Augustinians in 1102 and gifted vineyards on the Kallmuth hill by Kloster Neustadt. Rettersheim was first mentioned in 1284.

In the 14th century, Gerhard von Schwarzburg, Bishop of Würzburg, sold Homburg castle to Johann I, Count of Wertheim. Homburg was granted town privileges in 1332 by Emperor Louis IV. Rudolf von Scherenberg, Bishop of Würzburg, bought back Homburg castle in the late 15th century. It then became the seat of the local Amt (local representative) of the Bishop. A part of Lengfurt (Uffhofen) belonged to the Counts of Wertheim from 1357, whilst the remainder (Niederhofen) was part of the monastery lands after 1305. The two holdings were divided by today's Kaisergasse.

In 1525, Triefenstein Monastery was plundered by local peasants.

=== 17th to 19th centuries ===
After the (Protestant) Counts of Wertheim died out, the Bishop of Würzburg gradually confiscated most of their holdings including, in 1612, Lengfurt.

During the Thirty Years War, the monks fled the monastery before the advancing Swedish troops. It stood empty until 1634. From 1632 to 1634 the area was again administered by the Protestant Count of Wertheim, who had received the authority from the Swedish occupation force.

In 1803, with the Reichsdeputationshauptschluss and the dissolution of the ecclesial states, Kloster Triefenstein passed to the Counts of Löwenstein-Wertheim, who at times used it as a residence.

Rettersheim and Trennfeld also passed with the 1803 Reichsdeputationshauptschluss to the Counts of Löwenstein-Wertheim, passing again in 1806 to the Principality of Aschaffenburg. The Amt of Homburg in the Prince-Bishopric (Hochstift) of Würzburg passed for a sum of money to the Kingdom of Bavaria, and then in 1805 to the Grand Duchy of Würzburg.

The seat of the local court was moved from Homburg, first to Lengfurt and Roßbrunn (now part of Waldbüttelbrunn), then in 1806 to Marktheidenfeld.

According to local tradition, Napoleon spent a night in a building on the market square of Lengfurt on his way to Russia in 1812. It is an established fact that the French army crossed the Main river here in May 1812 on a specially constructed wooden bridge. This is shown in a fresco painted on one of the buildings on the market square in 1914.

Between 1814 and 1816, all current parts of the community Triefenstein passed to the Kingdom of Bavaria. In the course of administrative reform in Bavaria, the communities of Rettersheim, Homburg am Main, Lengfurt and Trennfeld came into being with the Gemeindeedikt ("Municipal Edict") of 1818.

In 1845, Queen Victoria crossed the Main at Lengfurt when she visited what was then Schloss Triefenstein (the former monastery) owned by the Löwenstein family.

=== 20th century ===
At least since the early 19th century, Jewish families had been living in the centre of Homburg, forming a Jewish community and building a synagogue in 1873. On Christmas Day 1938, SA men burned the house of worship down. The location where the synagogue once stood is now marked by a memorial plaque.

The constituent parts of today's Markt Triefenstein were amalgamated with each other in the course of municipal reform in Bavaria in 1978.

== Demographics ==
Within the town limits, 3,502 inhabitants were counted in 1970, 3,530 in 1987, 4,201 in 2000 and in 2005 4,720.

== Economy ==
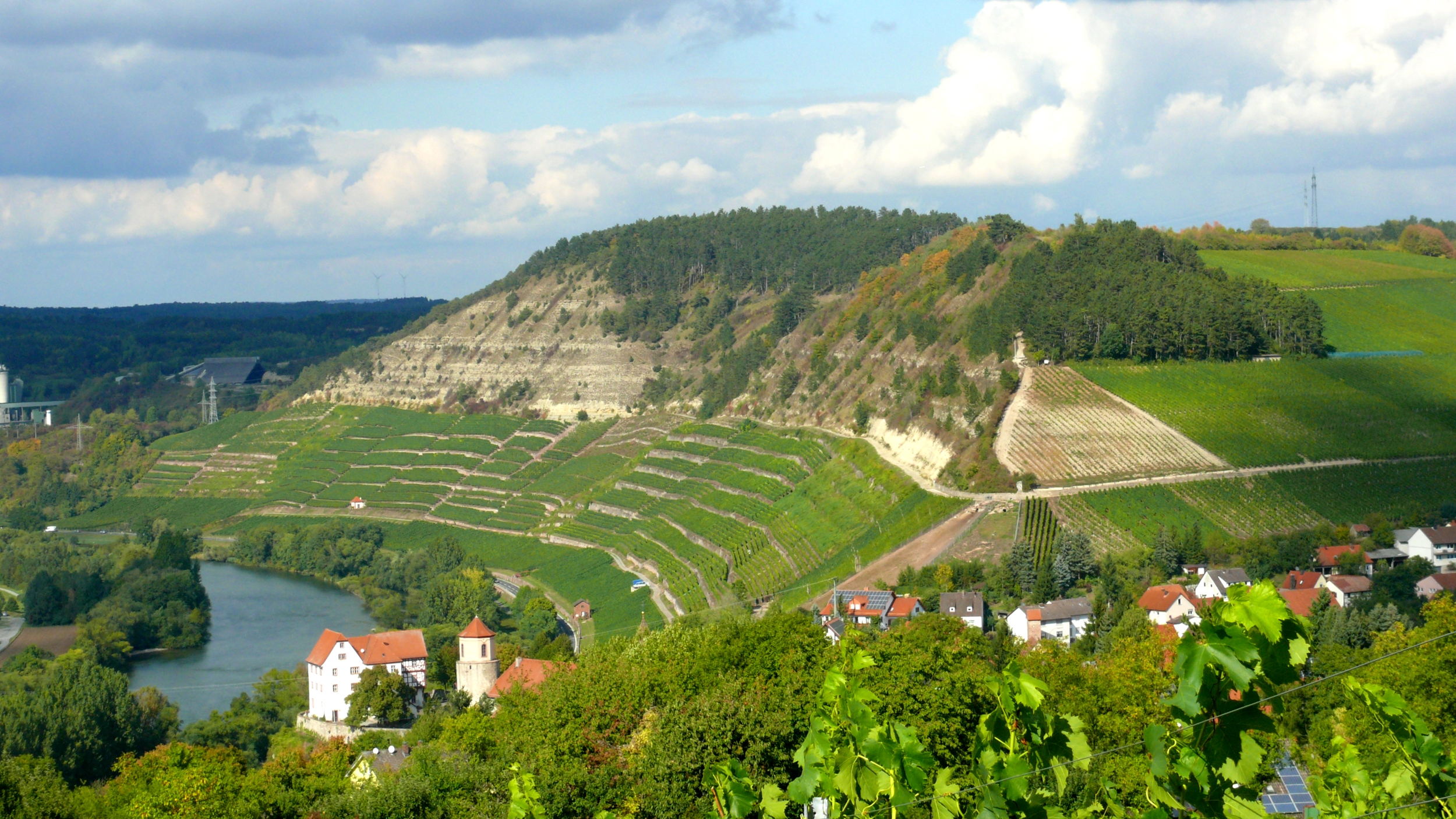
Vineyards on Kallmuth, with Homburg in the foreground.

Lengfurt and Homburg have long been wine-growing communities, especially the appellations Kallmuth and Edelfrau are well-known. In medieval and early modern times, the monastery had been a significant producer of wine. When plundered by Swedish forces in 1631, the wine cellars of Kloster Triefenstein contained over 100,000 litres of wine.

In 2012, Homburg had 55 hectares of vineyards under cultivation, compared to just 2 in 1990 and 8 in 1963. Back in 1694, vineyards had covered 118 hectares.

Some of the hill area formerly covered by vineyards has disappeared today: Between Lengfurt and Homburg there is a large HeidelbergCement cement works and quarry, first established in the late 1890s.

Lengfurt used to be a fishing and shipping town, but these industries have now disappeared.

Today, tourism plays a role in the local economy. There are several hotels, inns and other accommodations. A large camping site is located north of Lengfurt.

According to official statistics, there were 6 workers on the social welfare contribution rolls working in agriculture and forestry in 1998. In producing businesses this was 673, and in trade and transport 95. In other areas, 93 workers on the social welfare contribution rolls were employed, and 1,503 such workers worked from home. There were 2 processing businesses. Six businesses were in construction, and furthermore, in 1999, there were 56 agricultural operations with a working area of 1 100 ha, of which 956 ha was cropland and 105 ha was meadowland.

Municipal taxes in 1999 amounted to €2,017,000 (converted), of which net business taxes amounted to €323,000.

== Attractions ==
=== Lengfurt ===
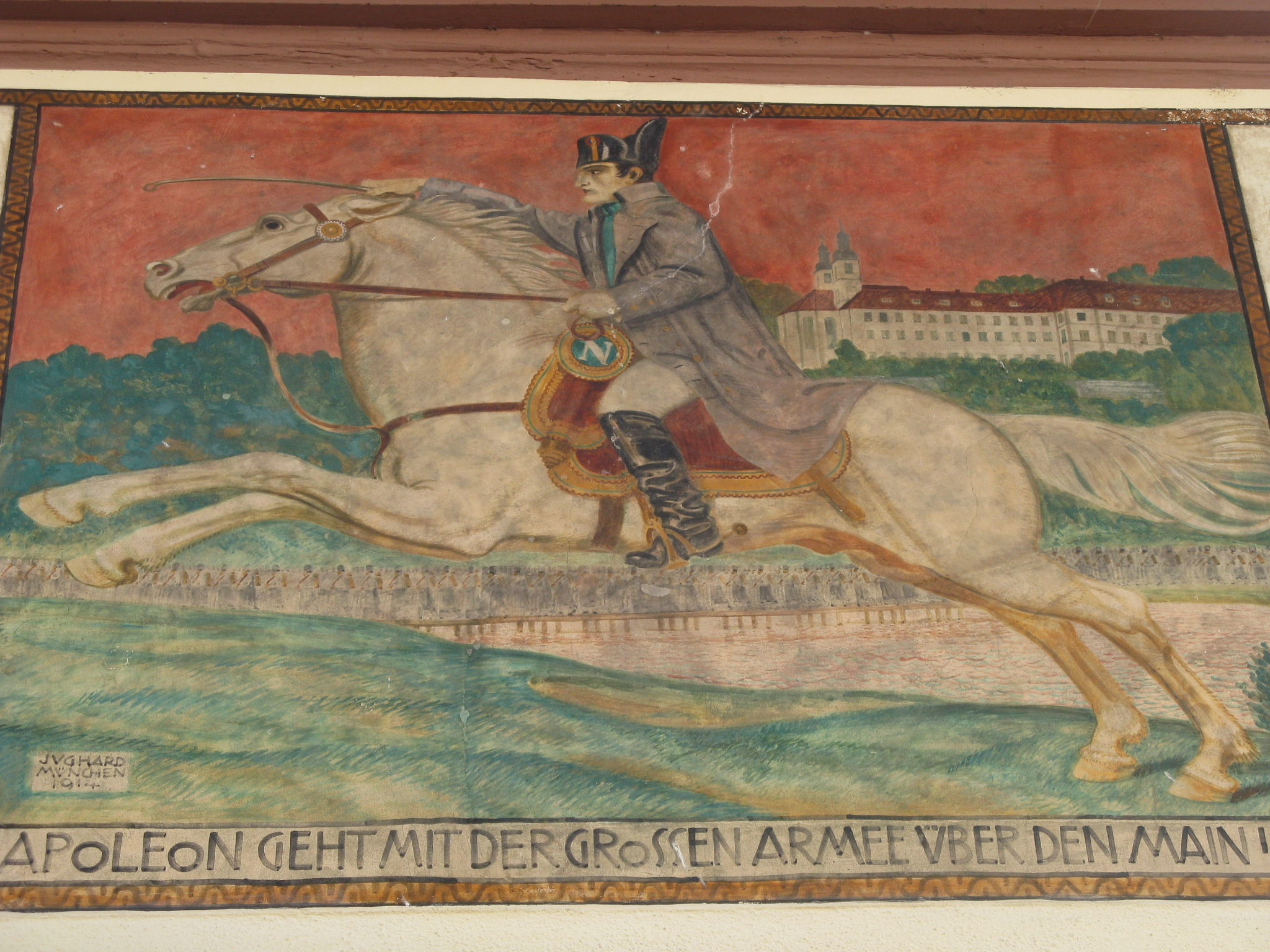
Fresco of Napoleon crossing the Main at Lengfurt in 1812, made in 1914.

- Dreifaltigkeitssäule - an obelisk dedicated to the Holy Trinity, inspired by a similar column in Vienna, erected in 1728 by Ritter Johann Joseph von Neuff (1676-1734) and designed by Jakob van der Auwera. It is unique in Franconia and was renovated in 2012.
- The parish church Sankt Jakobus (1613/14) features an altar with a figure group of the baptism of Jesus by Würzburg court-sculptor Peter Wagner (1799), originally at the Juliusspital at Würzburg, and an ivory altar cross (circa 1730, probably made in Vienna).

=== Trennfeld ===
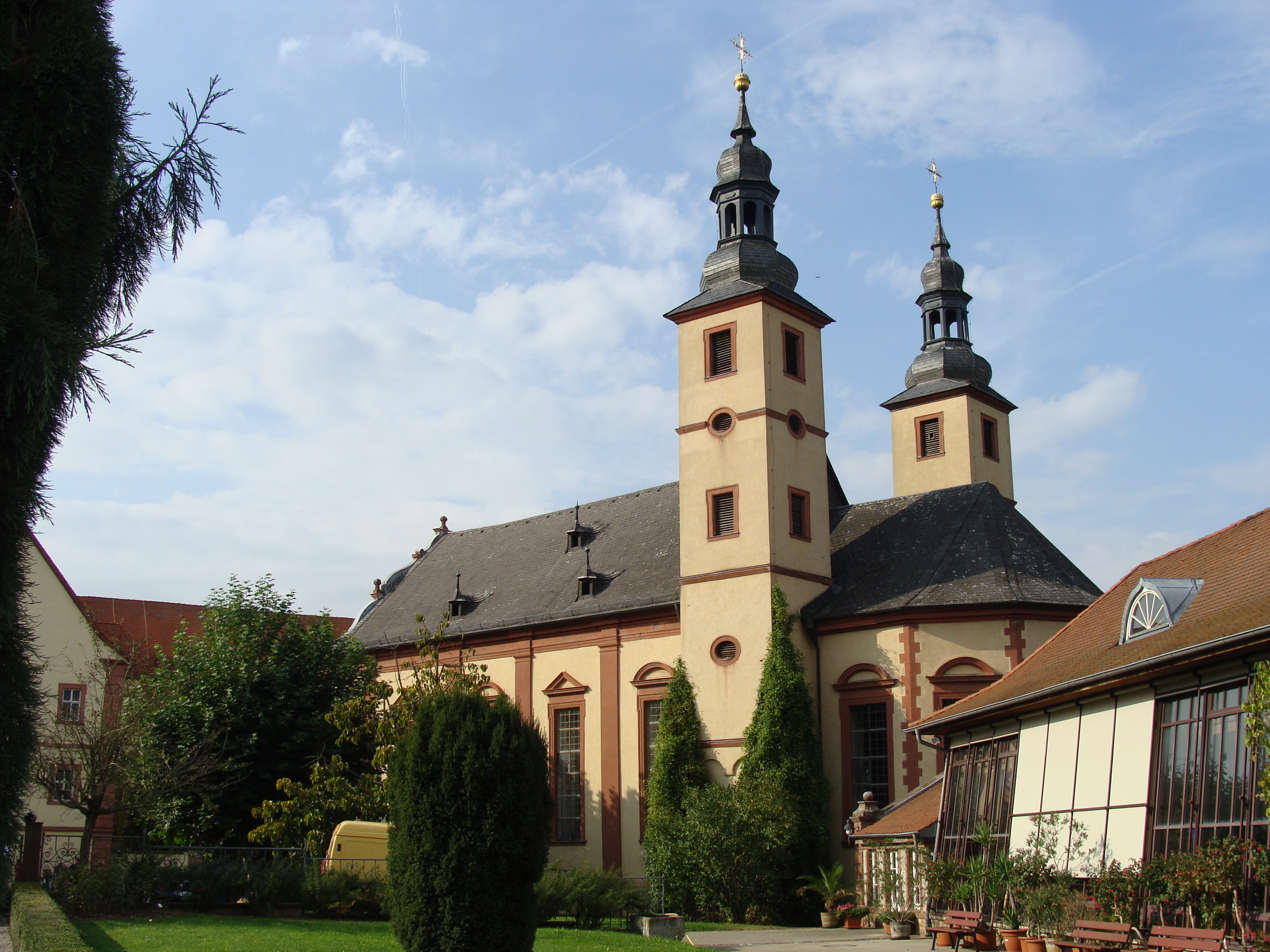
The church of Kloster Triefenstein.

- Kloster Triefenstein - founded in 1102 by Gerung, dean of Kollegiatstift Neumunster in Würzburg. The monastery was named after a nearby spring (Triefender Stein). In 1160, the church and monastery burned down. A new, Romanesque, church was consecrated in 1164. From 1617 to 1620 significant alterations were made to this church. Then from 1687 to 1715 church and monastery were completely rebuilt, likely by Würzburg architect Valentin Pezani (d. 1719). The current church (Klosterkirche St. Peter und Paul) has one nave with a choir flanked by two slender towers (dating to 1687). The interior decoration dates to 1783 to 1803 and is considered a high point of Franconian Neoclassicism. The Löwenstein family sold the monastery in 1986 to the Protestant Christusträger-Bruderschaft.The Kloster is not generally open to the public, but access is possible at certain times.
- Sankt Georg, Catholic church - built in 1590 by Julius Echter von Mespelbrunn and consecrated in 1593. I features the tomb of the von Gebsattel family and the notable tomb of Heinrich von Reinstein (of the von Ravensburg family, d.1349).
- Klingenbach Schlucht (or Klingelsbachgraben) - a gorge on the right bank of the Main. The gorge has been a protected natural monument since 1992.

=== Homburg ===
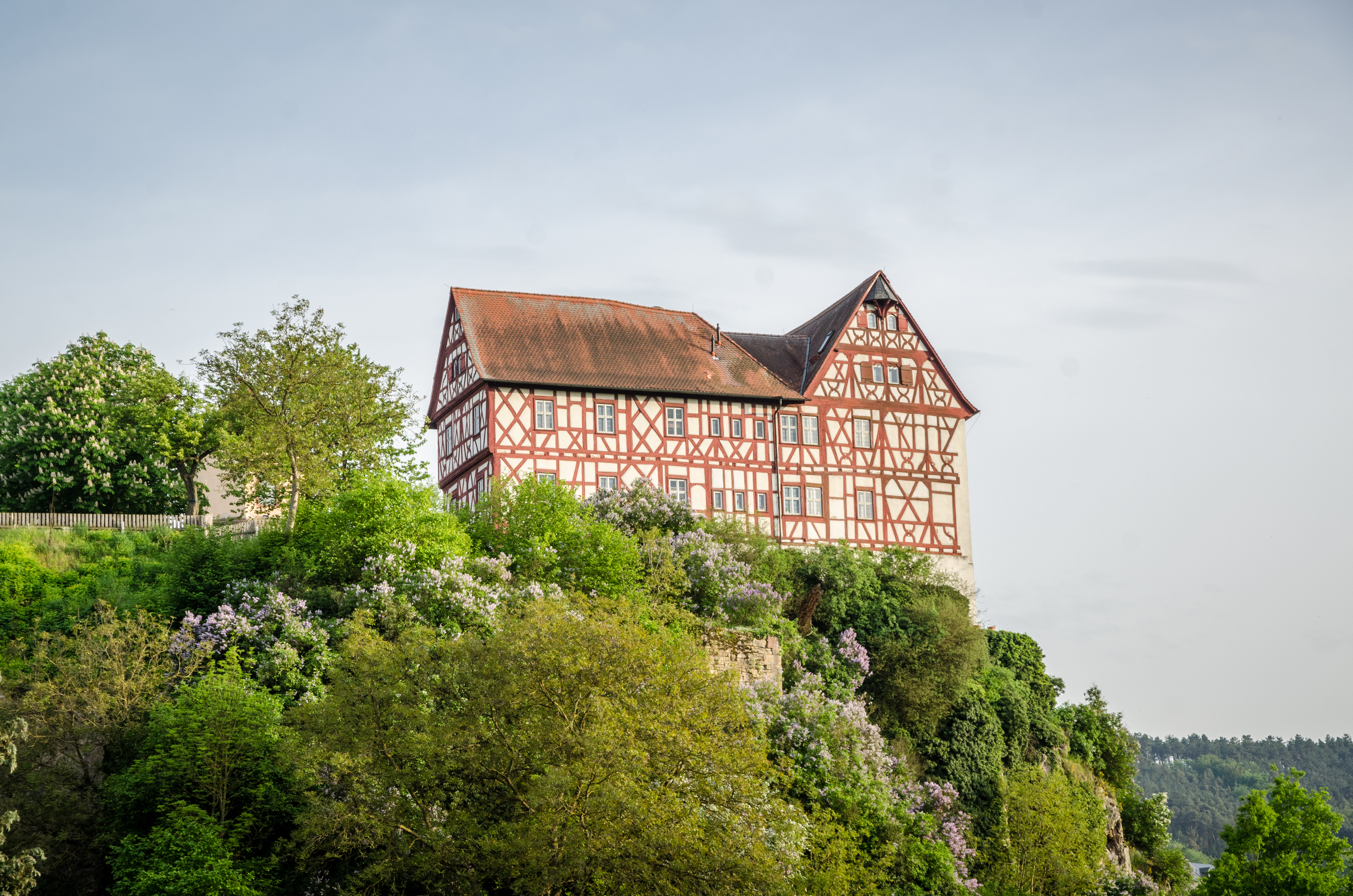
Schloss Homburg.

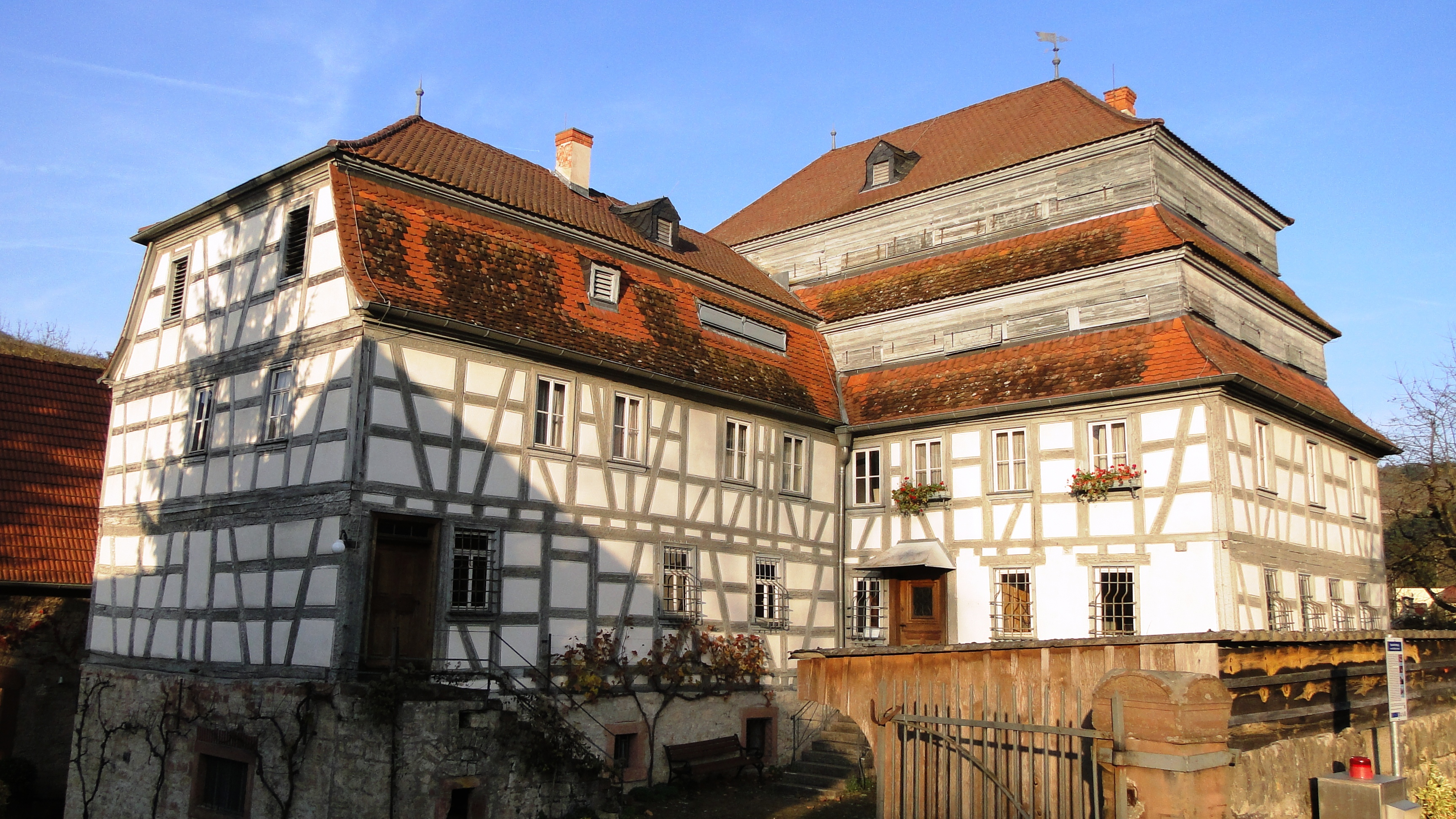
Paper mill at Homburg.

- Burkardusgrotte (or Burkaduskapelle) - a natural cave containing an altar dedicated to Saint Burchard, consecrated in 1721. The altar was brought here from Würzburg Cathedral. The cave is the destination of an annual pilgrimage procession. The tufa rock surrounding the grotto was also quarried in the past - Balthasar Neumann probably used it for the ceilings of the Würzburg Residence.
- Schloss Homburg (castle) - The lower floors of the Romanesque donjon date to the 12th to 13th centuries, whilst the octagonal top was only added in the 18th century. The three-wing half-timbered building (circa 1568) of the von Gebsattel family, who served as Amtsmänner for Würzburg is the only remaining palas in the castle. In 1602, Bishop Julius Echter bought the castle. With the removal of official functions from Homburg, the castle fell into disuse in the 1830s. Since 1869 the castle has been owned by the town. It served as a school, as a rectory and as the seat of the municipal administration. However, in the 1970s these uses ceased - after 1978 the newly created Markt Triefenstein was administered from Lengfurt.
- Sankt Burkhard, parish church featuring an altar with a marble relief "Christ praying at the Mount of Olives" (1613), brought to Homburg in 1721 from the crypt of Würzburg Cathedral. It was later removed from the Burkhardus grotto and moved into the church.
- Zehntscheuer - the former tithe barn, built by Julius Echter from 1605 to 1614. From 1934 to 1977, it housed the wine presses for the local winemakers' cooperative.
- Paper mill - established in 1807, this historic water-powered paper mill was in use until 1975. It was renovated in 1994 to 1997, and again produces high-quality paper. It also features a museum.

== Government ==
Seat of the municipal administration is Lengfurt. The mayor is Norbert Endres (CSU).

=== Coat of arms ===
The community's arms might be described thus: A fess wavy argent, in chief azure a trident erect Or between two roses of the first barbed and seeded of the third, in base gules two keys in saltire, that bendwise of the third surmounting the other of the first.

The two crossed keys come from the arms once borne by the Triefenstein Monastery and recall that the monastery church was consecrated to Saint Peter. Trennfeld's now disused arms were also chargeed with these keys, and likewise with the trident, which is confirmed by a village seal from 1777. As a guild's hallmark, it refers to the important Main fishery. The two silver roses come from Lengfurt's likewise disused arms. As heraldic emblems of the Counts of Wertheim, they recall the Counts' lordship over the village until they died out in 1556. The wavy fess (horizontal stripe) symbolizes the community's geographical location on the river Main. The tinctures argent and gules (silver and red) are those once borne by the Prince-Bishopric of Würzburg, which maintained an Amt in Homburg.

The arms have been borne since 1981.

== Infrastructure ==
=== Transportation ===
Since 1904, a bridge across the Main at Lengfurt has connected the two parts of the community. Previously, traffic crossed the river by fording it or on ferries.

The major Bundesautobahn 3 passes through Triefenstein between Rettersheim and the Triefenstein Monastery. Bundesstraße 8 touches the borders of the community but passes to the north. At Lengfurt there is the Staustufe Lengfurt on the river Main, built in 1936.

A railway track that followed the right bank of the Main, connecting Lohr and Wertheim, and that served a station at Trennfeld until 1975/76 has been demolished.

== Education ==
In 1999, the following institutions existed in Triefenstein:

- Kindergartens: 200 places with 178 children
- Primary schools: 1 with 14 teachers and 275 pupils
