= Büttenpapierfabrik Gmund =

German paper company

- Type: GmbH & Co. KG
- Industry: Paper production
- Founded: 1829
- Founder: Johann Nepomuk Haas
- Headquarters: Gmund am Tegernsee, Germany
- Key people: Florian Kohler
- Products: fine papers, woodfree uncoated paper, paper products
- Number of employees: approx. 120
- Divisions: Gmund, lakepaper, Gmund Retail
- Website: www.gmund.com

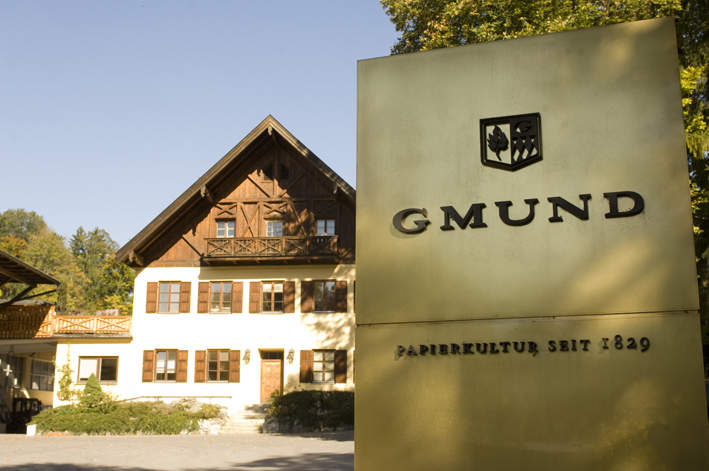
Company building

The Büttenpapierfabrik Gmund GmbH & Co. KG is a paper manufacturer with its headquarters in Gmund am Tegernsee and about 120 employees. The company operates in papermaking in the sectors fine paper, woodfree uncoated paper and paper products. Gmund customers in about 70 countries.

== History ==
From the beginnings, under the management of Johann Nepomuk Haas, founder of the company, GMUND started to produce fine hand made papers. The Kohler family, who has been running the company since 1904, continued this idea and also developed it further on to suit the times.

Johann Nepomuk Haas founded the paper mill in 1829. He had the license to collect rags, which you needed to produce paper. Till 1850 paper was exclusively made from rags. In 1854 Gregor Fichtner took over responsibility for the business and extended it to 60 employees. He concentrated on producing hand made fine paper and supplying papers for official and government documentation. At that time Gmund was purveyor to the Bavarian Royal Court of Munich. After the conflagration in 1860 Gregor Fichtner rebuilt the factory and installed in 1886 the first paper machine. It is still in full activity and therefore one of the oldest running machines in Europe.

In 1904 the paper mill was taken over by Ludwig Alois Kohler, an ancestor of today's owner. He had the revolutionary idea of producing coloured paper and he introduced a wide variety of different structures to the basic paper using felt markings and embossing calendars. Ludwig A. Kohler died 1921 when the bottom edge of his coat caught in the paper machine and he was dragged into the rotating drums. His nephew continued the business. During World War II atypical papers such as map papers, filter paper for gas masks, photographic papers blackened with soot and black-out paper were produced at Gmund am Tegernsee. In 1952 the factory was taken over by Ludwig Maximilian Kohler († 2004) and the fine paper segment was expanded. A second paper machine was installed by Ludwig M. Kohler in order to offer a bigger range of products and formats. At these days his son, Florian Kohler, runs the company.

== Products ==
The range consists of more than 25 different collections with about 100, 000 product variations. Gmund also produces customized products.

== Ecology ==
In July 2006 Gmund papers has been certified by the FSC (Forest Stewardship Council) (Nr. GFA – COC – 001370). For the production of FSC certified papers Gmund uses only FSC-certified material and material from controlled cultivation. All non FSC-certified materials are controlled according to the FSC standard for controlled wood (FSC-STD-40-005).
